= Grant Morrison bibliography =

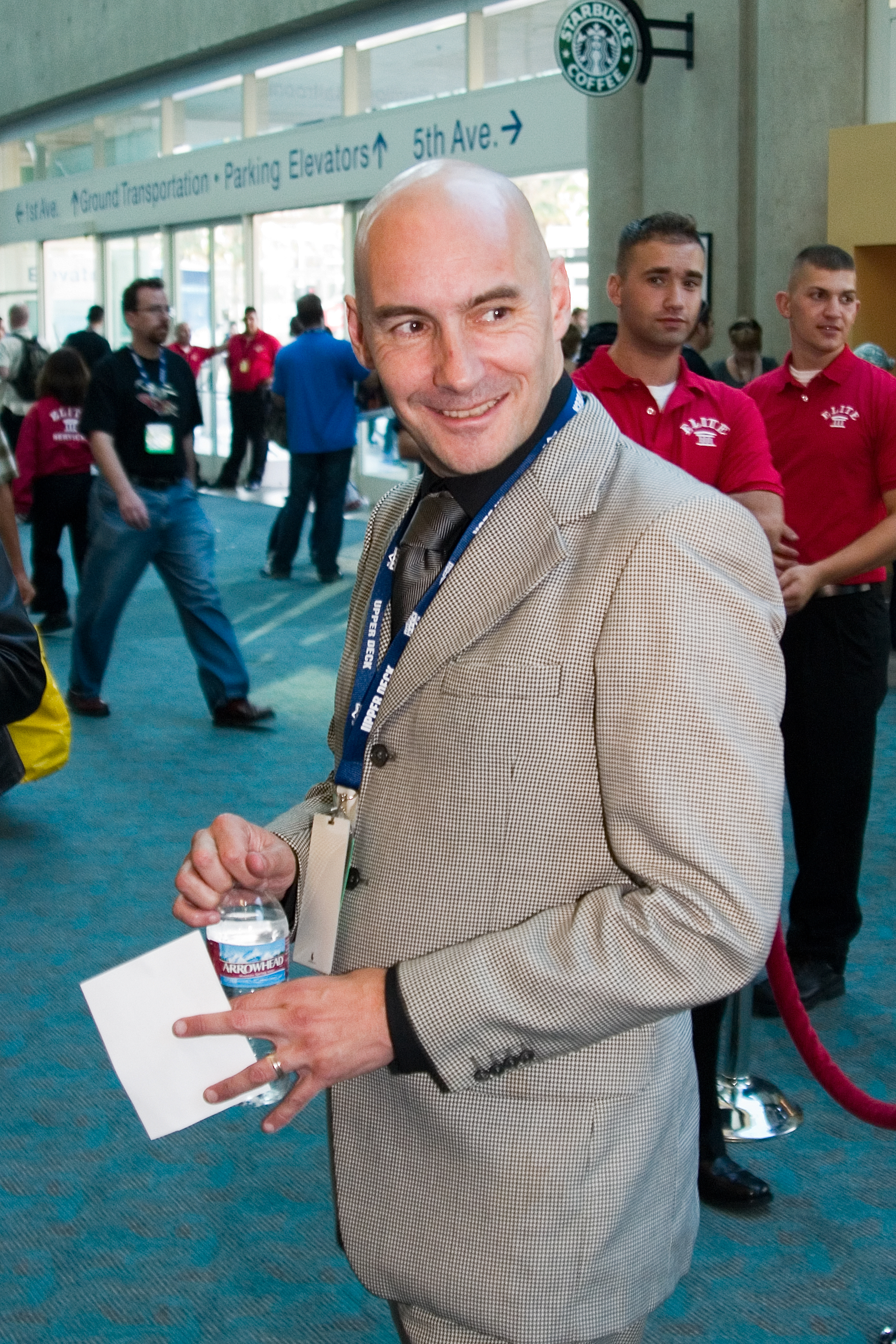
- Grant Morrison at Comic-Con 2008
- Active period: 1978–present

Publishers
- 2000 AD: 1986–1994
- DC Comics: 1988–present
- Vertigo: 1993–2011
- Image Comics: 1993–2015
- Marvel Comics: 1995–2004

This is a bibliography of the Scottish comic book writer Grant Morrison.

== Comics ==
=== UK publishers ===
Titles published by various British publishers include:

- Near Myths (script and art, anthology, Galaxy Media):
  - "Time is a Four-Lettered Word" (in #2, 1978)
  - "The Vatican Conspiracy" (in #3–4, 1978–1979)
  - "The Checkmate Man" (in #5, 1980)
- Captain Clyde (script and art, weekly newspaper strip, 1979–1982)
  - Distributed via three local Scottish newspapers: Govan Press, Renfrew Press and Clydebank Press.
  - Composed of around 150 episodes published between 1 November 1979 to 5 November 1982.
- Starblazer (anthology, DC Thomson):
  - "Algol the Terrible" (script and art, in #15, 1979)
  - "Last Man on Earth" (with Keith Robson, in #28, 1980)
  - "Operation Overkill" (with Enrique Alcatena, in #45, 1981)
  - "The Cosmic Outlaw" (with José Ortiz, in #86, 1982)
  - "The Death Reaper" (with Enrique Alcatena, in #127, 1984)
  - "Gateway to Terror" (as inker — on Tony O'Donnell; written by N. Austin, in #142, 1985)
  - "Doom World!" (as inker — on Tony O'Donnell; written by Ray Aspden, in #152, 1985)
  - "Mind Bender" (with Enrique Alcatena, in #167, 1986)
  - "The Midas Mystery" (with Enrique Alcatena, in #177, 1986)
  - "The Ring of Gofannon" (with Ricardo Garijo, in #209, 1987)
- Warrior #26 + Spring Special: "The Liberators" (with John Ridgway, anthology, Quality Communications, 1985; 1996)
- Food for Thought: "Gideon Stargrave in... Famine" (script and art, anthology one-shot, Flying Pig, 1985)
- DC London Editions:
  - Superman: Official 1986 Annual: "Osgood Peabody's Big Green Dream Machine..." (three-page prose story with illustrations by Barry Kitson; 64 pages, 1985, ISBN 0-7235-6763-8)
  - Batman: Official 1986 Annual: "The Stalking" (three-page prose story with illustrations by Garry Leach; 64 pages, 1985, ISBN 0-7235-6762-X)
- Sunrise #1–2: "Abraxas: Prologues I and II" (with Tony O'Donnell, co-feature, Harrier, 1987)
- Heartbreak Hotel #4: "Born Again Punk" (script and art, anthology, Willyprods/Small Time Ink, 1988)
- The Adventures of Luther Arkwright #10 (one-page illustration, Valkyrie Press, 1989)
- Cut (Jul '89–Sep '89): "The New Adventures of Hitler" (with Steve Yeowell, strip in the magazine, Ideas Ltd, 1989)
  - Three black-and-white six-page installments of this controversial strip were published before the Cut magazine ceased publication.
  - The colored version of the published chapters as well as the continuation of the story were printed in Crisis #46–49 (anthology, Fleetway, 1990)
- Trident #1–4: "St. Swithin's Day" (with Paul Grist, anthology, Trident, 1989–1990)
  - A colorized version of the story was published as St. Swithin's Day (one-shot, Trident, 1990)
  - The black-and-white version was published in the US market as St. Swithin's Day (one-shot, Oni Press, 1998)
- A1 #3: "The House of Heart's Desire" (with Dom Regan, anthology, Atomeka, 1990)
- Letterbox: "Juliet 4 Romeo" (with Paul Grist, one-page strip in the free giveaway book published by Royal Mail, 1991)
- Così Fan Tutte Programme (untitled four-page strip in programme insert, with Cameron Stewart, Scottish Opera, 2001)
- The Key (with Rian Hughes, a webcomic commissioned by BBC as part of its Freedom2014 initiative, 2014)
  - First published in print as a feature in Heavy Metal #282 (anthology, Heavy Metal Media, 2016)

==== Marvel UK ====
Titles published by Marvel UK include:

- Captain Britain vol. 2 #13: "Captain Granbretan" (four-page prose story with illustrations by John Stokes, co-feature, 1986)
  - Collected in Captain Britain Omnibus (hc, 688 pages, Marvel, 2009, ISBN 0-7851-3760-2)
  - Collected in Captain Britain: End Game (tpb, 256 pages, Panini, 2010, ISBN 1-84653-459-3)
- Spider-Man and Zoids (Zoids co-feature — published alongside The Amazing Spider-Man reprints):
  - "Old Soldiers Never Die" (with Geoff Senior, in #18, 1986)
  - "A Fine and Private Place" (with Geoff Senior, in #19, 1986)
  - "Deserts" (with Ron Smith (#30) and Geoff Senior (#31), in #30–31, 1986)
  - "Bits and Pieces" (with John Ridgway, in #36–37, 1986)
  - "The Black Zoid" (with Kev Hopgood and Steve Yeowell (#43, 45–46), in #40–46, 1986–1987)
  - "Orientation" (with Steve Yeowell, in #47, 1987)
  - "Out of the Blue" (with Steve Yeowell, in #48, 1987)
  - "Blue Moon, Red Dawn" (with Steve Yeowell, in #49, 1987)
  - "Schumacher's Story" (with Phil Gascoine, in #50, 1987)
- Doctor Who Magazine (anthology):
  - Doctor Who: The World Shapers (tpb, 288 pages, Panini, 2008, ISBN 1-905239-87-4) includes:
    - "Changes" (with John Ridgway, in #118–119, 1986)
    - "The World Shapers" (with John Ridgway, in #127–129, 1987)
  - Doctor Who: A Cold Day in Hell (tpb, 180 pages, Panini, 2009, ISBN 1-84653-410-0) includes:
    - "Culture Shock" (with Bryan Hitch, in #139, 1988)
- Action Force (anthology):
  - Action Force #17: "Meditations in Red" (with Steve Yeowell, 1987)
  - Action Force Monthly #3: "Old Scores" (with Mark Farmer, 1988)

==== Fleetway ====
Titles published by Fleetway include:

- 2000 AD (anthology):
  - Tharg's Future Shocks:
    - All-Star Future Shocks (tpb, 192 pages, Simon & Schuster, 2013, ISBN 1-78108-074-7) includes:
      - "Hotel Harry Felix!" (with Geoff Senior, in #463, 1986)
      - "The Alteration" (with Alan Langford, in #466, 1986)
      - "Alien Aid" (with John Stokes, in #469, 1986)
      - "Some People Never Listen!" (with Barry Kitson, in #475, 1986)
      - "The Shop That Sold Everything" (with John Stokes, in #477, 1986)
      - "Wheels of Fury" (with Geoff Senior, in #481, 1986)
      - "Curse Your Lucky Star" (with Barry Kitson, in #482, 1986)
      - "Ulysses Sweet: Maniac for Hire" (with Johnny Johnstone, in #507, 1987)
      - "Ulysses Sweet in... Fruitcake and Veg" (with Colin MacNeil, in #508–509, 1987)
      - "Fair Exchange" (with Colin MacNeil, in #514, 1987)
      - "The Invisible Etchings of Salvador Dalí" (with John Hicklenton, in #515, 1987)
      - "Big Trouble for Blast Barclay" (with Mike White, in #516, 1987)
      - "Return to Sender" (with Jeff Anderson, in Annual '87, 1986)
    - The Best of Tharg's Future Shocks (tpb, 160 pages, Rebellion, 2008, ISBN 1-905437-81-1) includes:
      - "2000 BC!" (as "The Mighty One"; with Eric Bradbury, in #473, 1986)
    - 2000 AD Presents: Sci-Fi Thrillers (tpb, 320 pages, Rebellion, 2013, ISBN 1-78108-177-8) includes:
      - "Danger! Genius at Work!" (with Steve Dillon, in #479, 1986)
      - "Candy and the Catchman" (with John Ridgway, in #491, 1986)
  - Zenith:
    - Zenith: Phase One (hc, 112 pages, Rebellion, 2014, ISBN 1-78108-276-6) collects:
      - "Phase One: Tygers" (with Steve Yeowell, in #535–550, 1987)
      - "Interlude: Whitlock" (with Steve Yeowell, in #558) and "Interlude: Peyne" (in 559, 1988)
    - Zenith: Phase Two (hc, 112 pages, Rebellion, 2014, ISBN 1-78108-278-2) collects:
      - "Phase Two: The Hollow Land" (with Steve Yeowell, in #589–606, 1988)
      - "Interlude: Maximan" (with M. Carmona, in Winter Special '88, 1988)
    - Zenith: Phase Three (hc, 144 pages, Rebellion, 2015, ISBN 1-78108-321-5) collects:
      - "Mandala: Shadows and Reflections" (with Jim McCarthy, in Annual '90, 1989)
      - "Phase Three: War in Heaven" (with Steve Yeowell, in #626–634, 650–662, 667–670, 1989–1990)
    - Zenith: Phase Four (hc, 112 pages, Rebellion, 2015, ISBN 1-78108-346-0) collects:
      - "Phase Four: Jerusalem" (with Steve Yeowell, in #791–806, 1992)
      - "zzzzenith.com" (with Steve Yeowell, in Prog 2001, 2000)
  - Venus Bluegenes: "The Pleasures of the Flesh" (with Will Simpson, in Sci-Fi Special '88, 1988) collected in Rogue Trooper: Tales of Nu-Earth Volume 3 (tpb, 400 pages, Rebellion, 2012, ISBN 1-78108-068-2)
  - Really and Truly (with Rian Hughes, in #842–849, 1993) collected in Yesterday's Tomorrows (hc, 256 pages, Knockabout, 2007, ISBN 0-86166-154-0; tpb, Image, 2011, ISBN 1-60706-314-X)
  - Judge Dredd:
    - "Inferno" (with Carlos Ezquerra, in #842–853, 1993) collected in Judge Dredd: The Complete Case Files Volume 19 (tpb, 320 pages, Rebellion, 2012, ISBN 1-907992-96-0)
    - "Book of the Dead" (co-written by Morrison and Mark Millar, art by Dermot Power, in #859–866, 1993) collected in Judge Dredd: The Complete Case Files Volume 20 (tpb, 320 pages, Rebellion, 2013, ISBN 1-78108-141-7)
    - "Crusade" (co-written by Morrison and Mark Millar, art by Mick Austin, in #928–937, 1995) collected in Judge Dredd: The Complete Case Files Volume 22 (tpb, 304 pages, Rebellion, 2014, ISBN 1-78108-227-8)
  - Big Dave (co-written by Morrison and Mark Millar):
    - "Target: Baghdad" (with Steve Parkhouse, in #842–845, 1993)
    - "Monarchy in the UK" (with Steve Parkhouse, in #846–849, 1993)
    - "Young Dave" (with Steve Parkhouse, in Yearbook '94, 1993)
    - "Costa del Chaos" (with Anthony Williams, in #869–872, 1994)
    - "Wotta Lotta Balls" (with Steve Parkhouse, in #904–907, 1994)
  - Janus: Psi Division:
    - "Will o' the Wisp" (with Carlos Ezquerra, in Winter Special '93, 1993)
    - "House of Sighs" (co-written by Morrison and Maggie Knight, art by Paul Johnson, in #953, 1995)
    - "Faustus" (co-written by Morrison and Mark Millar, art by Paul Johnson, in #1024–1031, 1997)
  - Tharg the Mighty: "A Night 2 Remember" (with Steve Yeowell, one page in 2000 AD's 25th anniversary strip featuring a Zenith cameo, in #1280, 2002)
- Revolver #1–7: "Dare" (with Rian Hughes, anthology, 1990–1991) — with a short recap strip and the final installment published in Crisis #55–56 (anthology, 1991)
  - The entire serial was collected in Yesterday's Tomorrows (hc, 256 pages, Knockabout, 2007, ISBN 0-86166-154-0; tpb, Image, 2011, ISBN 1-60706-314-X)
  - The serial was also reprinted in oversized format as Dare: The Controversial Memoir of Dan Dare (tpb, 80 pages, Xpresso, 1991, ISBN 1-85386-211-8)
- Crisis #56–61: "Bible John-A Forensic Meditation" (with Daniel Vallely, anthology, 1991)
- The Comic Relief Comic (among other writers and artists, one-shot, 1991)

=== DC Comics ===
Titles published by DC Comics and its various imprints include:

- Animal Man (with Chas Truog, Tom Grummett (#9 and 14) and Paris Cullins (#22), 1988–1990) collected as:
  - Volume 1 (collects #1–9, tpb, 240 pages, 1991, ISBN 1-56389-005-4)
  - Origin of the Species (collects #10–17, tpb, 225 pages, Vertigo, 2002, ISBN 1-56389-890-X)
    - Includes "The Myth of the Creation" short story (art by Tom Grummett) from Secret Origins vol. 2 #39 (anthology, 1989)
  - Deus Ex Machina (collects #18–26, tpb, 232 pages, Vertigo, 2003, ISBN 1-56389-968-X)
  - Animal Man by Grant Morrison Omnibus (collects #1–26 and the short story from Secret Origins vol. 2 #39, hc, 712 pages, Vertigo, 2013, ISBN 1-4012-3899-8)
  - Animal Man by Grant Morrison Compendium (collects #1–26 and the short story from Secret Origins vol. 2 #39, tpb, 712 pages, DC Black Label, 2024, ISBN 1-7795-2779-9)
- Doom Patrol (with Richard Case, Doug Braithwaite (#25), Kelley Jones (#36), Mike Dringenberg (#42), Steve Yeowell (#43), Vince Giarrano (#45), Ken Steacy (#53), Sean Phillips (#58) and Stan Woch (#59–62), 1989–1993) collected as:
  - Book One (collects #19–34, tpb, 424 pages, Vertigo, 2016, ISBN 1-4012-6312-7)
  - Book Two (collects #35–50, tpb, 448 pages, Vertigo, 2016, ISBN 1-4012-6379-8)
  - Book Three (collects #51–63, tpb, 424 pages, Vertigo, 2017, ISBN 1-4012-6597-9)
    - Includes Doom Force Special (written by Morrison, art by Steve Pugh, Ian Montgomery, Richard Case, Paris Cullins, Duke Mighten and Ken Steacy, 1992)
  - Doom Patrol by Grant Morrison Omnibus (collects #19–63 and Doom Force Special, hc, 1,200 pages, Vertigo, 2014, ISBN 1-4012-4562-5)
- Batman:
  - Arkham Asylum: A Serious House on Serious Earth (with Dave McKean, graphic novel, hc, 120 pages, 1989, ISBN 0-930289-48-X; sc, 1990, ISBN 0-930289-56-0)
    - A 15th Anniversary Edition of the graphic novel featuring Morrison's original script and story annotations was published as Batman: Arkham Asylum (hc, 216 pages, 2004, ISBN 1-4012-0424-4; sc, 2005, ISBN 1-4012-0425-2)
    - A 30th Anniversary Edition of the graphic novel with "remastered" artwork was published as Batman: Arkham Asylum (Absolute Edition, 248 pages, 2019, ISBN 1-4012-9420-0; sc, 224 pages, DC Black Label, 2020, ISBN 1-77950-433-0)
  - Batman: Legends of the Dark Knight #6–10: "Gothic" (with Klaus Janson, anthology, 1990) collected as Batman: Gothic (tpb, 96 pages, 1992, ISBN 1-56389-028-3; hc, 144 pages, 2015, ISBN 1-4012-5516-7)
  - Batman (with Andy Kubert, John Van Fleet (#663), Tony Daniel, J. H. Williams III (#667–669), Ryan Benjamin (#675) and Lee Garbett (#682–683), 2006–2009) collected as:
    - The Black Glove (collects #655–658, 663–669, 672–675, hc, 384 pages, 2012, ISBN 1-4012-3336-8; tpb, 2014, ISBN 1-4012-4402-5)
    - The Resurrection of Ra's al Ghul (includes #670–671, hc, 256 pages, 2008, ISBN 1-4012-1785-0; tpb, 2009, ISBN 1-4012-2032-0)
    - Batman R.I.P. (collects #676–683 and excerpts from DC Universe #0, hc, 192 pages, 2009, ISBN 1-4012-2090-8; tpb, 2010, ISBN 1-4012-2576-4)
    - Batman by Grant Morrison Omnibus Volume 1 (collects #655–658, 663–683 + story-related excerpts from 52 #30, 47, DC Universe #0 and Final Crisis #1–2, 5–7, hc, 678 pages, 2018, ISBN 1-4012-8299-7)
  - Batman and Robin (with Frank Quitely (#1–3), Philip Tan (#4–6), Cameron Stewart (#7–9, 16), Andy Clarke (#10–12), Dustin Nguyen (#12), Frazer Irving (#13–16) and Chris Burnham (#16), 2009–2011) collected as:
    - Batman Reborn (collects #1–6, hc, 168 pages, 2010, ISBN 1-4012-2566-7; tpb, 2011, ISBN 1-4012-2987-5)
    - Batman vs. Robin (collects #7–12, hc, 168 pages, 2010, ISBN 1-4012-2833-X; tpb, 2011, ISBN 1-4012-3271-X)
    - Batman and Robin Must Die! (collects #13–16, hc, 168 pages, 2011, ISBN 1-4012-3091-1; tpb, 2012, ISBN 0-85768-427-2)
      - Includes the Batman: The Return one-shot (written by Morrison, art by David Finch, 2011)
    - Absolute Batman and Robin: Batman Reborn (collects #1–16 and Batman: The Return, hc, 488 pages, 2013, ISBN 1-4012-3737-1)
    - Batman by Grant Morrison Omnibus Volume 2 (includes #1–16, hc, 760 pages, 2019, ISBN 1-4012-8883-9)
  - Batman: The Return of Bruce Wayne #1–6 (with Chris Sprouse (#1), Frazer Irving (#2), Yanick Paquette (#3), Georges Jeanty (#4), Ryan Sook + Pere Pérez (#5) and Lee Garbett (#6), 2010)
    - Collected as Batman: The Return of Bruce Wayne (hc, 224 pages, 2011, ISBN 1-4012-2968-9; tpb, 2012, ISBN 1-4012-3382-1)
    - Collected in Batman by Grant Morrison Omnibus Volume 2 (hc, 760 pages, 2019, ISBN 1-4012-8883-9)
  - Batman #700–702 (with Tony Daniel and Frank Quitely + Scott Kolins + Andy Kubert + David Finch (#700), 2010)
    - Collected as Batman: Time and the Batman (hc, 128 pages, 2011, ISBN 1-4012-2989-1; tpb, 2012, ISBN 1-4012-2990-5)
    - Collected in Batman by Grant Morrison Omnibus Volume 2 (hc, 760 pages, 2019, ISBN 1-4012-8883-9)
  - Batman Incorporated (with Yanick Paquette (#1–3, 5), Pere Pérez (#3), Chris Burnham, Scott Clark (#8), Frazer Irving (vol. 2 #0), Andres Guinaldo (vol. 2 #6), Jason Masters (vol. 2 #7–10) and Andrei Bressan (vol. 2 #10), 2011–2013) collected as:
    - Volume 1 (collects #1–8, hc, 264 pages, 2012, ISBN 1-4012-3212-4; tpb, 2013, ISBN 1-4012-3827-0)
      - Includes the Batman Incorporated: Leviathan Strikes! one-shot (written by Morrison, art by Cameron Stewart and Chris Burnham, 2011)
    - Demon Star (collects vol. 2 #0–6, hc, 176 pages, 2013, ISBN 1-4012-4263-4; tpb, 2013, ISBN 1-4012-4263-4)
    - Gotham's Most Wanted (includes vol. 2 #7–10 and 12–13, hc, 240 pages, 2013, ISBN 1-4012-4400-9; tpb, 2014, ISBN 1-4012-4697-4)
      - Also collects Batman Incorporated vol. 2 #11 (written by Chris Burnham, drawn by Jorge Lucas, 2013)
    - Absolute Batman Incorporated (collects #1–8, vol. 2 #1–13 and Batman Incorporated: Leviathan Strikes!, hc, 648 pages, 2015, ISBN 1-4012-5121-8)
    - Batman by Grant Morrison Omnibus Volume 3 (collects #1–8, vol. 2 #1–13, Batman: The Return and Batman Incorporated: Leviathan Strikes!, hc, 688 pages, 2020, ISBN 1-77950-271-0)
  - Batman: Black and White (unreleased series of graphic novels featuring out-of-continuity stories illustrated by various artists such as Gerard Way, Bill Sienkewicz and Ivan Reis — initially announced in 2015)
  - Arkham Asylum 2 (with Chris Burnham, unreleased graphic novel starring Damian Wayne as the Batman of future Gotham City — initially announced in 2017 but put on hold due to Morrison's other commitments)
  - Detective Comics #1027: "Detective #26" (with Chris Burnham, co-feature, 2020) collected in Batman: The Black Casebook (hc, 400 pages, 2026, ISBN 1-7995-0942-7)
- Secret Origins vol. 2 #46: "Ghosts of Stone" (with Curt Swan, anthology, 1989)
- Hellblazer #25–26 (with David Lloyd, 1990) collected in John Constantine, Hellblazer Volume 4 (tpb, 288 pages, Vertigo, 2012, ISBN 1-4012-3690-1)
- Kid Eternity #1–3 (with Duncan Fegredo, 1991) collected as Kid Eternity (tpb, 144 pages, Vertigo, 2006, ISBN 1-4012-0933-5; hc, 176 pages, 2015, ISBN 1-4012-5811-5)
- Fast Forward #1: "A Glass of Water" (with Dave McKean, anthology, Piranha Press, 1992)
- Aztek, the Ultimate Man #1–10 (co-written by Morrison and Mark Millar, art by N. Steven Harris, 1996–1997) collected as Aztek, the Ultimate Man (tpb, 240 pages, 2008, ISBN 1-4012-1688-9)
- JLA (with Howard Porter and Óscar Jiménez (#8–9), 1997–2000) collected as:
  - The Deluxe Edition Volume 1 (collects #1–9, hc, 256 pages, 2008, ISBN 1-4012-1843-1; tpb, 2012, ISBN 1-4012-3314-7)
    - Includes the "Star-Seed" short story (co-written by Morrison and Mark Millar, art by Howard Porter) from JLA Secret Files & Origins #1 (1997)
  - The Deluxe Edition Volume 2 (collects #10–17, hc, 320 pages, 2009, ISBN 1-4012-2265-X; tpb, 336 pages, 2012, ISBN 1-4012-3518-2)
    - Includes the JLA/WildC.A.T.s one-shot (written by Morrison, art by Val Semeiks, 1997)
    - Includes the New Year's Evil: Prometheus one-shot (written by Morrison, art by Arnie Jorgensen, 1998)
  - The Deluxe Edition Volume 3 (collects #22–26 and 28–31, hc, 256 pages, 2010, ISBN 1-4012-2659-0; tpb, 344 pages, 2013, ISBN 1-4012-3832-7)
    - The hardcover collection also includes JLA #1,000,000, while the paperback version omits both this issue and the two lead-in pages from JLA #23.
  - The Deluxe Edition Volume 4 (includes #34 and 36–41, hc, 368 pages, 2011, ISBN 1-4012-2909-3; tpb, 384 pages, 2014, ISBN 1-4012-4385-1)
    - The paperback collection also includes fill-in issues penned by other writers, while the hardcover version includes two other related works by Morrison:
      - JLA: Earth 2 (with Frank Quitely, graphic novel, hc, 96 pages, 2000, ISBN 1-56389-575-7; sc, 2000, ISBN 1-56389-631-1)
      - JLA: Classified #1–3 (with Ed McGuinness, 2005) also collected as JLA: Ultramarine Corps (tpb, 144 pages, 2007, ISBN 1-4012-1564-5)
- The Flash vol. 2 (co-written by Morrison and Mark Millar, art by Paul Ryan and Ron Wagner (#137–138), 1997–1998) collected as:
  - Emergency Stop (collects #130–135, tpb, 144 pages, 2009, ISBN 1-4012-2177-7)
  - The Human Race (includes #136–138, tpb, 160 pages, 2009, ISBN 1-4012-2239-0)
    - Includes the "Flash of Two Worlds" short story (art by Mike Parobeck) from Secret Origins vol. 2 #50 (anthology, 1990)
  - The Flash by Grant Morrison and Mark Millar (includes #130–138, tpb, 334 pages, 2016, ISBN 1-4012-6102-7; hc, 416 pages, 2025, ISBN 1-7995-0042-X)
- New Gods Secret Files & Origins: "Lost Pages: Orion and Big Barda Join the JLA" (with N. Steven Harris, co-feature in one-shot, 1998)
- DC One Million Omnibus (hc, 1,080 pages, 2013, ISBN 1-4012-4243-X) includes:
  - DC One Million #1–4 (with Val Semeiks, 1998) also collected as DC One Million (tpb, 208 pages, 1999, ISBN 1-84023-094-0)
  - DC One Million 80-Page Giant: "The Divided Self" (with Cully Hamner) and "Crisis One Million" (with Dusty Abell, anthology one-shot, 1999)
- DC Comics Presents: Mystery in Space: "Two Worlds" (with Jerry Ordway, co-feature in one-shot, 2004)
- Seven Soldiers #0–1 (with J. H. Williams III, 2005 + 2006)
  - These two issues served as bookends for a number of interrelated limited series:
    - Seven Soldiers: Manhattan Guardian #1–4 (with Cameron Stewart, 2005)
    - Seven Soldiers: Shining Knight #1–4 (with Simone Bianchi, 2005)
    - Seven Soldiers: Klarion the Witch Boy #1–4 (with Frazer Irving, 2005)
    - Seven Soldiers: Zatanna #1–4 (with Ryan Sook, 2005)
    - Seven Soldiers: Mister Miracle #1–4 (with Pasqual Ferry (#1) and Freddie Williams II, 2005–2006)
    - Seven Soldiers: Bulleteer #1–4 (with Yanick Paquette, 2006)
    - Seven Soldiers: Frankenstein #1–4 (with Doug Mahnke, 2006)
  - In collected editions, all 30 issues are presented in the original publication order:
    - Seven Soldiers of Victory Volume 1 (collects Seven Soldiers #0, Manhattan Guardian #1–4, Shining Knight #1–3, Klarion #1–3, Zatanna #1–3, hc, 400 pages, 2010, ISBN 1-4012-2695-7; tpb, 2012, ISBN 1-4012-2951-4)
    - Seven Soldiers of Victory Volume 2 (collects Shining Knight #4, Klarion #4, Zatanna #4, Mister Miracle #1–4, Bulleteer #1–4, Frankenstein #1–4, Seven Soldiers #1, hc, 400 pages, 2011, ISBN 1-4012-2963-8; tpb, 2012, ISBN 1-4012-2964-6)
    - Seven Soldiers by Grant Morrison Omnibus (collects Seven Soldiers #0–1, Manhattan Guardian #1–4, Shining Knight #1–4, Klarion #1–4, Zatanna #1–4, Mister Miracle #1–4, Bulleteer #1–4, Frankenstein #1–4, hc, 792 pages, 2018, ISBN 1-4012-8151-6)
- Superman:
  - All-Star Superman #1–12 (with Frank Quitely, DC All-Star, 2006–2008) collected as All-Star Superman (Absolute Edition, 320 pages, 2010, ISBN 1-4012-2917-4; tpb, 2011, ISBN 1-4012-3205-1)
  - Action Comics vol. 2 (with Rags Morales, Brent Anderson (#2), Gene Ha (#3 and 9), Andy Kubert (#5–6), Brad Walker, CAFU (#12), Ben Oliver (#0) and Travel Foreman (#13), 2011–2013) collected as:
    - Superman: Action Comics — Superman and the Men of Steel (collects #1–8, hc, 256 pages, 2012, ISBN 1-4012-3546-8; tpb, 2013, ISBN 1-4012-3547-6)
    - Superman: Action Comics — Bulletproof (collects #9–12 and 0, hc, 224 pages, 2013, ISBN 1-4012-4101-8; tpb, 2013, ISBN 1-4012-4254-5)
    - Superman: Action Comics — At the End of Days (collects #13–18, hc, 224 pages, 2013, ISBN 1-4012-4232-4; tpb, 2014, ISBN 1-4012-4606-0)
    - Superman by Grant Morrison Omnibus (collects #0–18, hc, 680 pages, 2021, ISBN 1-77950-813-1; corrected edition, 2021, ISBN 1-77951-397-6)
- 52 (co-written by Morrison, Greg Rucka, Mark Waid and Geoff Johns, art by Joe Bennett (#1–4, 6, 11, 16, 21, 25, 30, 34, 38, 51), Chris Batista (#5, 10, 17, 20, 29, 31, 40, 45, 52), Ken Lashley (#7), Eddy Barrows (#8, 12, 18, 22, 44, 49, 52), Shawn Moll (#9, 15, 27), Todd Nauck (#11 and 13), Dale Eaglesham (#14 and 25), Pat Olliffe (#19, 25–26, 32, 37, 46, 52), Drew Johnson (#23 and 28), Phil Jimenez (#24–25, 35), Tom Derenick + Joe Prado (#33), Dan Jurgens (#35 and 43), Jamal Igle (#36 and 45), Andy Smith (#39), Giuseppe Camuncoli (#41 and 47), Darick Robertson (#42, 48, 52), Justiniano (#50 and 52) and Mike McKone (#52) from layouts by Keith Giffen, 2006–2007) collected as:
  - Volume 1 (collects #1–13, tpb, 304 pages, 2007, ISBN 1-4012-1353-7)
  - Volume 2 (collects #14–26, tpb, 304 pages, 2007, ISBN 1-4012-1364-2)
  - Volume 3 (collects #27–39, tpb, 304 pages, 2007, ISBN 1-4012-1443-6)
  - Volume 4 (collects #40–52, tpb, 326 pages, 2007, ISBN 1-4012-1486-X)
  - Omnibus (collects #1–52, hc, 1,216 pages, 2012, ISBN 1-4012-3556-5)
- DCU: Brave New World (anthology one-shot, 2006) featured two segments credited as "based on ideas and concepts developed by Grant Morrison":
  - "Uncle Sam and the Freedom Fighters" (co-written by Justin Gray and Jimmy Palmiotti, drawn by Daniel Acuña)
    - Continued by the same creative team as Uncle Sam and the Freedom Fighters #1–8 (2006–2007)
  - "The All-New Atom" (written by Gail Simone, drawn by John Byrne)
    - Continued as The All-New Atom #1–25 (2006–2008)
- Wildstorm:
  - Wildcats vol. 4 #1: "A Halo 'Round the World" (with Jim Lee, 2006)
    - Issue #2 was solicited but never released; Wildstorm editor Ben Abernathy indicated that Morrison and Lee's stint was planned to run for 6 issues.
    - Issue #1, along with Morrison's script for issue #2, was reprinted in Wildstorm: A Celebration of 25 Years (hc, 300 pages, 2017, ISBN 1-4012-7652-0)
  - The Authority vol. 3 #1–2: "Utopian" (with Gene Ha, 2006–2007)
    - Three years after issue #2, Wildstorm published a continuation of the series, written by Keith Giffen from a plotline by Morrison and Giffen:
      - The Authority: The Lost Year #3–12 (drawn by various artists; issues #8–9 are co-written by Giffen and J. M. DeMatteis, 2010)
    - Issues #1–2 and The Lost Year #3–7 are collected as The Authority: The Lost Year Book One (tpb, 168 pages, 2010, ISBN 1-4012-2749-X)
  - The company-wide crossover storyline "World's End", which launched in 2008, was based on Morrison's original outline for Wildcats and The Authority.
- Metal Men vol. 3 #1–8 (written and drawn by Duncan Rouleau — each issue of the series featured the credit of "based on ideas and concepts developed by Grant Morrison", 2007–2008)
- DC Universe #0 (co-written by Morrison and Geoff Johns; art by Ed Benes, George Pérez, Tony Daniel, Aaron Lopresti, Ivan Reis, Philip Tan, J. G. Jones, Doug Mahnke and Carlos Pacheco, one-shot, 2008)
- Final Crisis (hc, 352 pages, 2009, ISBN 1-4012-2281-1; tpb, 2010, ISBN 1-4012-2282-X) and Absolute Final Crisis (hc, 480 pages, 2012, ISBN 1-4012-3511-5) collect:
  - Final Crisis #1–7 (with J. G. Jones, Carlos Pacheco (#4–6), Marco Rudy (#5–6) and Doug Mahnke (#6–7), 2008–2009)
  - Final Crisis: Superman Beyond #1–2 (with Doug Mahnke, 2008–2009)
  - Final Crisis: Submit (with Matthew Clark, one-shot, 2008)
- The Multiversity #1–2 (with Ivan Reis, 2014–2015)
  - These two issues served as bookends for a number of interrelated one-shots:
    - The Multiversity: The Society of Super-Heroes (with Chris Sprouse, 2014)
    - The Multiversity: The Just (with Ben Oliver, 2014)
    - The Multiversity: Pax Americana (with Frank Quitely, 2015)
    - The Multiversity: Thunderworld Adventures (with Cameron Stewart, 2015)
    - The Multiversity Guidebook (with Marcus To, Paulo Siqueira and various artists, 2015)
    - The Multiversity: Mastermen (with Jim Lee, 2015)
    - The Multiversity: Ultra Comics (with Doug Mahnke, 2015)
  - All nine issues were subsequently collected as The Multiversity (hc, 448 pages, 2015, ISBN 1-4012-5682-1; tpb, 2016, ISBN 1-4012-6525-1)
  - In 2015, Morrison announced Multiversity Too, a series of graphic novels that would explore various parallel worlds in the DC Multiverse.
  - The first in this line of graphic novels, tentatively titled Multiversity Too: The Flash, was announced for late 2016 but never materialized.
- Wonder Woman: Earth One (with Yanick Paquette, series of graphic novels set in an alternate universe and published under its own imprint):
  - Volume 1 (hc, 144 pages, 2016, ISBN 1-4012-2978-6; sc, 2017, ISBN 1-4012-6863-3)
  - Volume 2 (hc, 120 pages, 2018, ISBN 1-4012-8117-6; sc, cancelled, ISBN 1-4012-9414-6)
  - Volume 3 (hc, 136 pages, 2021, ISBN 1-77950-207-9)
  - The Complete Collection (compilation of all three volumes — tpb, 408 pages, 2022, ISBN 1-77951-691-6)
- Dark Knights Rising: The Wild Hunt (co-written by Morrison, Scott Snyder, James Tynion IV and Joshua Williamson, art by Howard Porter, Jorge Jiménez and Doug Mahnke, one-shot, 2018)
  - Collected in Dark Nights: Metal — Dark Knights Rising (hc, 216 pages, 2018, ISBN 1-4012-7737-3; tpb, 2019, ISBN 1-4012-8907-X)
  - Collected in Dark Nights: Metal Omnibus (hc, 760 pages, 2023, ISBN 1-77951-703-3)
- Sideways Annual #1: "Just Rifting Here" (co-written by Morrison and Dan Didio, art by Will Conrad, 2019) collected in Sideways: Rifts and Revelations (tpb, 208 pages, 2019, ISBN 1-4012-9154-6)
- The Green Lantern:
  - The Green Lantern (with Liam Sharp and Giuseppe Camuncoli (Annual), 2019) collected as:
    - Intergalactic Lawman (collects #1–6, hc, 176 pages, 2019, ISBN 1-4012-9139-2; tpb, 2019, ISBN 1-4012-9529-0)
    - The Day the Stars Fell (collects #7–12 and Annual #1, hc, 208 pages, 2019, ISBN 1-4012-9535-5; tpb, 2020, ISBN 1-77950-268-0)
  - The Green Lantern Season Two (with Liam Sharp, 2020–2021) collected as:
    - Volume 1 (collects #1–6, hc, 248 pages, 2020, ISBN 1-77950-553-1; tpb, 2021, ISBN 1-77951-331-3)
      - Includes the 3-issue spin-off limited series Green Lantern: Blackstars (written by Morrison, art by Xermánico, 2020)
    - Ultrawar (collects #7–12, hc, 168 pages, 2021, ISBN 1-77951-018-7; tpb, 2022, ISBN 1-77951-565-0)
- Superman and the Authority #1–4 (with Mikel Janín, 2021) collected as Superman and the Authority (hc, 144 pages, 2021, ISBN 1-77951-361-5; tpb, 2022, ISBN 1-77951-734-3)
- DC Pride: "Love's Lightning Heart" (with Hayden Sherman, anthology one-shot, 2023) collected in DC Pride: Better Together (hc, 192 pages, 2024, ISBN 1-77952-506-0)
- Batman/Deadpool: "The Cosmic Kiss Caper!" (with Dan Mora, anthology one-shot, 2026) collected in DC/Marvel: The Cosmic Kiss Caper and Other Stories (hc, 224 pages, 2026, ISBN 1-7995-1353-X; tpb, 2026, ISBN 1-79951-354-8)

==== Vertigo ====
Titles published by DC Comics' Vertigo imprint include:

- Sebastian O #1–3 (with Steve Yeowell, 1993) collected as Sebastian O (tpb, 80 pages, 2004, ISBN 1-4012-0337-X; hc, 168 pages, 2017, ISBN 1-4012-7419-6)
- Swamp Thing vol. 2 #140–143 (co-written by Morrison and Mark Millar, art by Phil Hester, 1994)
  - Collected in Swamp Thing: The Root of All Evil (tpb, 296 pages, 2015, ISBN 1-4012-5241-9)
  - Collected in Swamp Thing by Mark Millar and Phil Hester Omnibus (hc, 896 pages, 2025, ISBN 1-7795-2807-8)
- The Mystery Play (with Jon J. Muth, graphic novel, hc, 80 pages, 1994, ISBN 1-56389-108-5; sc, 1995, ISBN 1-56389-189-1)
- The Invisibles (with Steve Yeowell (#1–4, 22–24, vol. 3 #4–2), Jill Thompson (#5–9, 13–15, vol. 3 #4–3), Chris Weston (#10 + vol. 2 #9, 14–17, 19–22 + vol. 3 #3), John Ridgway (#11 and vol. 3 #4–2), Steve Parkhouse (#12 and vol. 3 #4), Paul Johnson (#16 and 21, vol. 3 #3), Phil Jimenez (#17–19 and vol. 2 #1–13), Tommy Lee Edwards (#20), Mark Buckingham (#25), Michael Lark (vol. 2 #6 and vol. 3 #3), Ivan Reis (vol. 2 #18), Philip Bond (vol. 3 #12–9 and 4), Warren Pleece (vol. 3 #11–9), Sean Phillips (vol. 3 #8–5), Ashley Wood (vol. 3 #4 and 2), Rian Hughes (vol. 3 #3), Cameron Stewart + Pander Brothers + Dean Ormston (vol. 3 #2) and Frank Quitely (vol. 3 #1), 1994–2000) collected as:
  - Book One (collects #1–12, hc, 328 pages, 2014, ISBN 1-4012-4502-1; tpb, 2017, ISBN 1-4012-6795-5)
    - Includes the "Hexy" short story (art by Duncan Fegredo) from the Absolute Vertigo one-shot (1995)
  - Book Two (collects #13–25, hc, 352 pages, 2014, ISBN 1-4012-4599-4; tpb, 2017, ISBN 1-4012-7481-1)
    - Includes the "And We're All Police Men" short story (art by Philip Bond) from Vertigo: Winter's Edge #1 (anthology, 1998)
  - Book Three (collects vol. 2 #1–13, hc, 336 pages, 2015, ISBN 1-4012-4951-5; tpb, 2018, ISBN 1-4012-8102-8)
  - Book Four (collects vol. 2 #14–22 and vol. 3 #12–1, hc, 512 pages, 2015, ISBN 1-4012-5421-7; tpb, 2018, ISBN 1-4012-8519-8)
  - Omnibus (collects #1–25, vol. 2 #1–22, vol. 3 #12–1 and the short stories, hc, 1,536 pages, 2012, ISBN 1-4012-3459-3)
  - Compendium (collects #1–25, vol. 2 #1–22, vol. 3 #12–1 and the short stories, tpb, 1,496 pages, 2026, ISBN 1-7995-0668-1)
- Vertigo Voices (umbrella title for a series of one-shots):
  - Kill Your Boyfriend (with Philip Bond, 1995)
  - Bizarre Boys (unproduced one-shot — to be co-written by Morrison with Peter Milligan and drawn by Jamie Hewlett)
- Flex Mentallo #1–4 (with Frank Quitely, 1996) collected as Flex Mentallo: Man of Muscle Mystery (hc, 112 pages, 2012, ISBN 1-4012-3221-3; tpb, 2014, ISBN 1-4012-4702-4)
- Weird War Tales vol. 2 #3: "New Toys" (with Frank Quitely, anthology, 1997) collected in Graphic Ink: DC Comics Art of Frank Quitely (hc, 368 pages, 2014, ISBN 1-4012-4840-3)
- The Filth #1–13 (with Chris Weston, 2002–2003) collected as The Filth (tpb, 320 pages, 2004, ISBN 1-4012-0013-3; hc, 2015, ISBN 1-4012-5545-0)
- LeSexy (with Cameron Stewart, unproduced 6-issue limited series — initially announced in 2002, the project was ultimately rejected by Vertigo editor Karen Berger)
- Indestructible Man (with Frank Quitely, unproduced series described by Morrison as "the third part of an informal "hypersigil" trilogy including The Invisibles and The Filth")
  - In 2004, Morrison stated this project was put on the back burner as "Flex Mentallo, The Invisibles and The Filth already formed the cohesive "hypersigil" trilogy".
- Seaguy (with Cameron Stewart):
  - Seaguy #1–3 (2004) collected as Seaguy (tpb, 104 pages, 2005, ISBN 1-4012-0494-5)
  - Seaguy: The Slaves of Mickey Eye #1–3 (2009)
  - Seaguy: Eternal (final part of the trilogy, initially announced in 2008 — Morrison reportedly completed the scripts in 2014)
- We3 #1–3 (with Frank Quitely, 2004–2005) collected as We3 (tpb, 104 pages, 2005, ISBN 1-4012-0495-3; hc, 144 pages, 2011, ISBN 1-4012-3067-9)
- Vimanarama #1–3 (with Philip Bond, 2005) collected as Vimanarama (tpb, 104 pages, 2006, ISBN 1-4012-0496-1; hc, 144 pages, 2016, ISBN 1-4012-6142-6)
- Warcop (with Sean Murphy, unreleased 6-issue limited series — initially announced in 2008 but abandoned in favor of The New Bible and Joe the Barbarian)
- The New Bible (with Camilla d'Errico — initially announced in 2009 as a reworking of the unreleased Warcop project, last mentioned by d'Errico in a 2011 interview)
- Joe the Barbarian #1–8 (with Sean Murphy, 2010–2011) collected as Joe the Barbarian (hc, 224 pages, 2011, ISBN 1-4012-2971-9; tpb, 2013, ISBN 1-4012-3747-9)

=== Marvel Comics ===
Titles published by Marvel include:

- Skrull Kill Krew #1–5 (co-written by Morrison and Mark Millar, art by Steve Yeowell, 1995) collected as Skrull Kill Krew (tpb, 128 pages, 2006, ISBN 0-7851-2120-X)
- Marvel Boy vol. 2 #1–6 (with J. G. Jones, Marvel Knights, 2000–2001) collected as Marvel Boy (tpb, 144 pages, 2001, ISBN 0-7851-0781-9; hc, 160 pages, 2008, ISBN 0-7851-3440-9)
- New X-Men (with Frank Quitely, Leinil Francis Yu (Annual), Ethan Van Sciver (#117–118, 123, 133), Igor Kordey, John Paul Leon (#127 and 131), Phil Jimenez, Keron Grant (#134), Chris Bachalo (#142–145) and Marc Silvestri (#151–154), 2001–2004) collected as:
  - Ultimate Collection: New X-Men Volume 1 (collects #114–126 and Annual '01, hc, 384 pages, 2002, ISBN 0-7851-0964-1; tpb, 2008, ISBN 0-7851-3251-1)
  - Ultimate Collection: New X-Men Volume 2 (collects #127–141, hc, 368 pages, 2003, ISBN 0-7851-1118-2; tpb, 2008, ISBN 0-7851-3251-1)
  - Ultimate Collection: New X-Men Volume 3 (collects #142–154, hc, 336 pages, 2004, ISBN 0-7851-1200-6; tpb, 2008, ISBN 0-7851-3253-8)
  - New X-Men Omnibus (collects #114–154 and Annual '01, hc, 992 pages, 2006, ISBN 0-7851-2326-1)
- Fantastic Four: 1 2 3 4 (hc, 120 pages, 2011, ISBN 0-7851-5896-0; tpb, 2018, ISBN 1-3029-1404-9) collects:
  - Fantastic Four: 1 2 3 4 #1–4 (with Jae Lee, Marvel Knights, 2001–2002) also collected as Fantastic Four: 1 2 3 4 (tpb, 96 pages, 2002, ISBN 0-7851-1040-2)
  - Marvel Knights Double Shot #2: "Nick's World" (with Manuel Gutiérrez, anthology, 2002)
- All-New Miracleman Annual: "October Incident: 1966" (with Joe Quesada, co-feature, 2015) collected in Miracleman: Olympus (hc, 328 pages, 2015, ISBN 0-7851-5466-3)
  - Morrison originally penned this short story in the mid-80s for Quality Communications' ongoing Miracleman feature in the Warrior magazine, then-written by Alan Moore.
  - The script was rejected at the insistence of Moore and remained unused until Marvel acquired the rights to the character and began publishing Miracleman stories.

=== Other US publishers ===
Titles published by various American publishers include:

- Eclipse:
  - Steed and Mrs. Peel #1–3: "The Golden Game" (with Ian Gibson, 1990–1991) collected in Steed and Mrs. Peel: The Golden Game (tpb, 160 pages, Boom! Studios, 2012, ISBN 1-60886-285-2)
  - Born to be Wild: "Dominion" (two versions of the same script — one illustrated by Daniel Vallely and the other by Tony Akins, anthology graphic novel, 80 pages, 1991, ISBN 1-56060-130-2)
- Image:
  - Spawn #16–18: "Reflections" (with Greg Capullo, Todd McFarlane Productions, 1993–1994)
    - Collected in Spawn: Origins Collection Volume 3 (tpb, 160 pages, 2009, ISBN 1-60706-119-8)
    - Collected in Spawn: Origins Collection Book Two (hc, 328 pages, 2010, ISBN 1-60706-228-3)
  - Happy! #1–4 (with Darick Robertson, 2012–2013) collected as Happy! (tpb, 96 pages, 2013, ISBN 1-60706-677-7; hc, 128 pages, 2013, ISBN 1-60706-838-9)
  - Nameless #1–6 (with Chris Burnham, 2015) collected as Nameless (hc, 192 pages, 2016, ISBN 1-63215-527-3; tpb, 2017, ISBN 1-5343-0093-7)
  - Ice Cream Man #43: "Hell Freezes" and "The Horror" (with Martin Morazzo, 1-page co-features, 2025) collected in Ice Cream Man: Horror, Horror (tpb, 128 pages, 2025, ISBN 1-53433-116-6)
- Vampirella Monthly (Harris):
  - Vampirella: The Morrison/Millar Collection (tpb, 176 pages, 2006, ISBN 0-910692-93-9) collects:
    - Vampirella 25th Anniversary Special: "Blood Red Game" (with Michael Bair, anthology, 1996)
    - "Ascending Evil" (co-written by Morrison and Mark Millar, art by Amanda Conner, in #1–3, 1997)
    - "Holy War" (co-plotted by Morrison and Mark Millar; written by Steven Grant, drawn by Louis Small, Jr., in #4–6, 1997)
  - "The Queen's Gambit" (co-plotted by Morrison and Mark Millar; written by Steven Grant, drawn by Amanda Conner, in #7–9, 1997)
- Dynamite:
  - 18 Days (story bible and scripts for the unproduced Virgin web project MBX with illustrations by Mukesh Singh, 120 pages, 2010, ISBN 1-60690-174-5)
    - After the dissolution of Virgin (subsequently renamed Liquid), its owners started a new company, Graphic India, and published an ongoing series based on Morrison's story bible and completed scripts:
      - Grant Morrison's 18 Days #1–21 (written by Sharad Devarajan, Gotham Chopra, Samit Basu, Ashwin Pande and Sarwat Chadda, drawn by Jeevan Kang, Francesco Biagini, Saumin Patel and Ronilson Freire, 2015–2017)
    - Graphic India also published a Morrison-written limited series that was partially serialized as a digital comic via Humble Bundle before its print release: Avatarex #1–4 (with Jeevan Kang (#1) and Edison George, 2016–2017)
  - Dinosaurs vs. Aliens (script by Morrison based on the concept by Barry Sonnenfeld, art by Mukesh Singh, graphic novel, 96 pages, 2012, ISBN 1-60690-345-4)
  - Captain Victory and the Galactic Rangers vol. 3 #6 (as artist — among others; written by Joe Casey, 2015) collected in Captain Victory and the Galactic Rangers (tpb, 168 pages, 2016, ISBN 1-5241-0008-0)
- Annihilator #1–6 (with Frazer Irving, Legendary, 2014–2015) collected as Annihilator (hc, 200 pages, 2015, ISBN 1-937278-44-1)
- Prometheus Eternal: "Prometheus is Here!" (with Farel Dalrymple, anthology one-shot, Locust Moon Press, 2015)
- Boom! Studios:
  - Klaus (with Dan Mora):
    - Klaus #1–7 (2015–2016) collected as Klaus: How Santa Claus Began (hc, 208 pages, 2016, ISBN 1-60886-903-2; tpb, 2019, ISBN 1-68415-393-X)
    - Klaus: The New Adventures of Santa Claus (hc, 128 pages, 2018, ISBN 1-68415-239-9; tpb, 2021, ISBN 1-68415-666-1) collects:
      - Klaus and the Witch of Winter (one-shot, 2016)
      - Klaus and the Crisis in Xmasville (one-shot, 2017)
    - Klaus: The Life and Times of Santa Claus (hc, 128 pages, 2021, ISBN 1-68415-642-4; tpb, 2024, ISBN 1-63796-940-6) collects:
      - Klaus and the Crying Snowman (one-shot, 2018)
      - Klaus and the Life and Times of Joe Christmas (one-shot, 2019)
  - Proctor Valley Road #1–6 (co-written by Morrison and Alex Child, art by Naomi Franquiz, 2021) collected as Proctor Valley Road (tpb, 144 pages, 2021, ISBN 1-68415-745-5)
- Love is Love (two-page illustration devised by Morrison and drawn by Jesús Merino, anthology graphic novel, 144 pages, IDW Publishing, 2016, ISBN 1-63140-939-5)
- Heavy Metal #280–292 (as Editor-in-Chief) — #293–294 (as "advisor") — #295 (as "creative advisor", anthology, Heavy Metal Media, 2016–2019)
  - In addition to the editorial duties, Morrison also penned a number of short stories and serials for the magazine:
    - "Beachhead" (with Benjamin Marra, in #280–281, 2016)
    - "Option 3" (with Simeon Aston, in #281, 2016)
    - "Industria and the Toilet That Traveled Through Time" and "The Key" (with Rian Hughes, in #282, 2016)
    - "The Smile of the Absent Cat" (with Gerhard, in #283 + 286 + 292 + 294 + 296, 2016–2019)
      - The sixth and final chapter, although completed, was not published for undisclosed legal reasons.
      - A collected edition was solicited for a 2021 release but subsequently cancelled: The Smile of the Absent Cat (hc, 48 pages, ISBN 0-9989190-0-4; tpb, ISBN 0-9989190-1-2)
    - "The Savage Sword of Jesus Christ" (with Molen brothers, in #284 and 290, 2017–2018)
      - The story was originally developed by Morrison in the mid-00s as a sequel to The New Adventures of Hitler; only two out of six planned episodes were published.
      - A collected edition was solicited for a 2019 release but subsequently cancelled: The Savage Sword of Jesus Christ (hc, 48 pages, ISBN 0-9989190-2-0)
    - "Mythopia" (with Andy Belanger, in #285, 2017)
    - "New Madonna" (with Menton J. Matthews III, in #288, 2017)
      - Issue #288 also featured a reprint of the short story "The House of Heart's Desire" with art by Dom Regan.
      - The story, originally published in A1 #3 (Atomeka, 1990), was reprinted with new coloring and lettering.
    - "Ten Sounds That Represent a Kind of Person: A Historical Parody" (with Benjamin Marra, in #289, 2017)
    - "Nihilophilia" (with Tula Lotay, in #291, 2018)
    - "The Rise and Fall of Empires" (with Rian Hughes, in #292, 2018)
- Ahoy Comics:
  - The Wrong Earth #1: ""Hud" Hornet's Holiday in Hell!" (three-page prose story with illustrations by Rob Steen, 2018)
  - High Heaven #1: "Festive Funtimes at the New World's Fair!" (three-page prose story with illustrations by Rick Geary, 2018)
  - Captain Ginger #1: "The Electric Sky Bear That Inspired Ben Franklin!" (two-page prose story with illustrations by Phil Hester, 2018)
  - Project Cryptid #1: "Partially Naked Came the Corpse! (Part One)" (seven-page prose story with an illustration by Jon Proctor, 2023)
- Anthrax: Among the Living: "Indians" (with Freddie Williams II, anthology graphic novel, sc, 120 pages, Z2 Comics, 2021, ISBN 1-940878-59-4; hc, 2026, ISBN 1-954928-24-6)
- Punch Volume 1–2 (written by Allan Amato from a story by Morrison and Amato, drawn by Jonathan Marks, Holy Crow Press, 2021–2023)
- Xanaduum Presents (series of unconnected digital one-shots self-published by Morrison via their Substack newsletter):
  - Eden’s End (with Liam Sharp, 2023)
  - Poison Peach (with Liam Sharp, 2023)
- Black Mask Studios:
  - General Strike: "The Last of the Prompt Engineers" (with Carlos Granda, anthology one-shot, 2025)
  - Sinatoro (with Vanesa del Rey, unproduced series — initially announced for April 2015, then late 2016)

== Prose fiction and playwriting ==
Most of Morrison's early non-comics work was reprinted in a single volume:

Lovely Biscuits (Oneiros Books, 1998, ISBN 1-902197-01-1)
Title	Year	Originally published in	ISBN	Originally published by	Notes
"The Braille Encyclopaedia"	1991	Hotter Blood	0-6717-0149-5	Pocket Books	Published as a short comic in Verotika #1 (Verotik, 1994); Adapted by Eric Burnham, drawn by Ted Naifeh
"The Room Where Love Lives"	1993	Hottest Blood	0-6717-5367-3	Pocket Books	Published as a short comic in Verotika #2 (Verotik, 1995); Adapted and drawn by Kim Hagen
"Lovecraft in Heaven"	1995	The Starry Wisdom	1-871592-32-1	Creation Books	
"I'm a Policeman"	1998	Disco 2000	0-34070-771-2	Sceptre	
"Red King Rising"					A play (first performed on 17 July 1989)
"Depravity"					A play (first performed on 16 August 1990)

Further short- and long-form prose works include:

- Skin Two #26: "The Story of Zero" (short story — written to accompany photos by Alexander Brattell created under the art direction of Steven Cook, 1998)
- Songs of the Black Würm Gism: "Luvkraft v. Kthulhu" (short story for the book of H. P. Lovecraft tributes, 356 pages, Oneiros Books, 2009, ISBN 1-902197-28-3)
  - The short story is based on a transcript of the spoken word performance staged for the Lovecraft Lives event (held at Waterstone's in Manchester on 6 August 1999)
- Luda: A Novel (hc, 448 pages, Del Rey, 2022, ISBN 0-593-35530-X; sc, Europa Editions, 2023, ISBN 1-787-70485-8)

== Nonfiction and other work ==
- ARK #25–26, 28–29 (short reviews of contemporary comics, Titan, 1988–1989)
- Speakeasy #101–119: "Drivel" (opinion column in the comics magazine, John Brown Publishing, 1989–1991)
  - A one-off installment titled "Son of Drivel: From My Pulpit" was published in Tripwire #3 (Tripwire, 1992)
- Rapid Eye Volume 3: "In Search of Maya Deren" (biographical piece for the book of essays, 256 pages, Creation Books, 1995, ISBN 1-871592-24-0)
- Sleazenation: "The Smell of Reason" (irregular column — only three (heavily edited) installments were published, Swinstead Publishing, 1998–2000)
- Malaparte: A House Like Me: "Unbuilding Malaparte" (short prose piece for the book about Casa Malaparte, 200 pages, Clarkson Potter, 2000, ISBN 0-609-60378-7)
- Fortune Hotel: "It was the 90s" (short piece detailing Morrison's Kathmandu experience for the book of travelogues, 320 pages, Penguin, 2000, ISBN 0-14-028108-8)
- Come Ride My Column (irregular column published via an older version of Morrison's website, 2000–2002)
- Book of Lies: The Disinformation Guide to Magick and the Occult: "Pop Magic!" (essay for the magic-themed book, 352 pages, Disinfo, 2003, ISBN 0-9713942-7-X)
  - A revised and expanded version of this essay was published under the title "Beyond the World and the Fool" in Heavy Metal #286 (Heavy Metal Media, 2017)
- Supergods (part autobiography, part analysis of the history of superheroes) published under two different subtitles:
  - Published in the UK, EU and Commonwealth countries (excluding Canada) by Jonathan Cape as Supergods: Our World in the Age of the Superhero (hc, 480 pages, 2011, ISBN 0-224-08996-X; sc, 2012, ISBN 0-09-954667-1)
  - Published in the US by Spiegel & Grau as Supergods: What Masked Vigilantes, Miraculous Mutants, and a Sun God from Smallville Can Teach Us About Being Human (hc, 480 pages, 2011, ISBN 1-4000-6912-2; sc, 2012, ISBN 0-8129-8138-3)
- Heavy Metal #280–285, 287–292 (editorials in the comics magazine, Heavy Metal Media, 2016–2018)
- Xanaduum: The Project of a Lifetime (newsletter published via Substack, 2022–present)

== Works about Morrison ==
- Neighly, Patrick and Cowe-Spigai, Kereth. Anarchy for the Masses: The Disinformation Guide to the Invisibles. Disinfo, 2003.
- Rauch, Stephen. "'We Have All Been Sentenced': Language as Means of Control in Grant Morrison's Invisibles." International Journal of Comic Art vol. 6 #2 (pp 350–363), 2004.
- Niederhausen, Michael. "Deconstructing Crisis on Infinite Earths: Grant Morrison's Animal Man, JLA: Earth 2, and Flex Mentallo." International Journal of Comic Art vol. 8 #1 (pp 271–282), 2006.
- Verano, Frank. "Invisible Spectacles, Invisible Limits: Grant Morrison, Situationist Theory, and Real Unrealities." International Journal of Comic Art vol. 8 #2 (pp 319–329), 2006.
- Callahan, Timothy. Grant Morrison: The Early Years. Sequart, 2007.
- Meaney, Patrick. Our Sentence is Up: Seeing Grant Morrison's The Invisibles. Sequart, 2009.
- Meaney, Patrick (director). Grant Morrison: Talking with Gods. Respect! Films and Sequart, 2010. Documentary film.
- Singer, Marc. Grant Morrison: Combining the Worlds of Contemporary Comics. University Press of Mississippi, 2011.
- Shapira, Tom. Curing the Postmodern Blues: Reading Grant Morrison and Chris Weston's The Filth in the 21st Century. Sequart, 2013.
- Walker, Cody. The Anatomy of Zur-en-Arrh: Understanding Grant Morrison's Batman. Sequart, 2014.
