= List of Crisis (British comics) stories =

A list of stories published in the Fleetway Publications comic Crisis between 1989 and 1991.

== Artoons ==
Published: #15-24 (1 April to 5 August 1989)
Artist: Brendan McCarthy

- Surreal back-page single frame cartoons.

== Bible John - A Forensic Examination ==
Published: #56-61 (March to August 1991)
Writer: Grant Morrison
Artist: Daniel Vallely

An examination of the Bible John killings in Glasgow.

== China in Crisis 1989 ==
Published: #42 (14 April 1990) and #45 (26 May 1990)
Writer: Tony Allen
Artist: David Hine

An account of the Tiananmen Square protests, and the authorities' brutal crackdown.

== The Crooked Mile/Angels Amongst Us ==
Published: #28-38 (30 September 1989 to 17 February 1990)
Writer and Artist: Philip Bond

- Cartoons printed on the rear cover; "The Cooked Mile" was a surreal, unsettling painted one-frame image, while "Angels Amongst Us" was a four-panel strip featuring an amiable, wisecracking angel.

== Dare ==
Published: #56 (March 1991)
Writer: Grant Morrison
Artist: Rian Hughes

Retired Colonel Dan Dare finds the future far than idyllic.

- Continued from Revolver. A summary of the story to date was printed in Crisis #55.

== For a Few Troubles More ==
Published: #40-43 (17 March to 28 April 1990) and #45-46 (28 May to 9 June 1990)
Writer: Garth Ennis
Artist: John McCrea

Belfast layabout Dougie Patterson is set to marry his long-suffering, pregnant girlfriend Valerie. The only sticking point is that Dougie insists on making his even more crass friend Ivor Thompson his best man, despite the inherent contradiction in terms.

- Sequel to "Troubled Souls". Collected in 1991 by Fleetway Publications as For a Few Troubles More. Dougie and Ivor were later resurrected by Ennis and McCrea for the 1997 Caliber Comics series Dicks, where the pair made a bungled attempt to become private detectives, and have subsequently appeared in titles published by Avatar Press.

== The General and the Priest ==
Published: #54-55 (January to February 1991)
Writer: Igor Goldkind
Artist: Jim Baikie

A Panamanian padre receives a visitor from his dark past, a former army general on the run from the American military.

- The story was published on the second anniversary of the United States invasion of Panama, which was compared to the then-contemporary Iraqi invasion of Kuwait by the editorial.

== Happenstance and Kismet ==
Published: #56-61 (March to August 1991)
Writer: Paul Neary
Artist: Steve Parkhouse

The misadventures of jazz musician Monty Happenstance and translator Lucius Kismet.

- Continued from Revolver.

== Insiders ==
Published: #54-59 (January to June 1991)
Writer: Mark Millar
Artist: Paul Grist

Frank Murray begins a 12-year stint in the dehumanising jail system of Northern Ireland.

== The New Adventures of Hitler ==
Published: #46-49 (9 June to 21 July 1990)
Writer: Grant Morrison
Artist: Steve Yeowell

In 1912 Liverpool, Austrian immigrant Alois and his wife Bridget reluctantly host the former's brother Adolf, a failed painter searching for the Holy Grail.

- Originally created for publication in Cut.

== New Statesmen ==
Published: #1-14 (17 September 1988 to 18 March 1989), #28 (30 September 1989)
Writer: John Smith
Artists: Jim Baikie (#1-4, #9-12 and #28), Sean Phillips (#5-6 and #13-14), Duncan Fegredo (#7-8)

In 2047, the 51 states of America (including England as the 51st) each possess genetically modified Optimen. Created with superhuman 'hard' and 'soft' talents, these are essentially biological weapons, and the world is in the grip of fear of genetic engineering and political warmongering.

- Repackaged as the five-issue limited series New Statesmen for the American market in 1989, and later compiled as The Complete New Statesmen by Fleetway.

== The Real Robin Hood ==
Published: #56-61 (March to August 1991)
Writer: Michael Cook
Artist: Gary Erskine

Unemployed artist Danny lands the role of Robin Hood at a new Nottingham theme part designed to commercialise the memory of the folk hero.

== Sinner: Viet Blues ==
Published: #52-55 (November 1990 to February 1991)
Writer: Carlos Sampayo
Artist: José Antonio Muñoz

Cop turned private eye Alack Sinner gets involved in a racially-charged case in Harlem.

- Originally printed in the 1986 Alack Sinner album "Viet Blues". Coloured for Crisis by Steve Whitaker.

== Sticky Fingers ==
Published: #15-21 (1 April to 24 June 1989) and #23-27 (22 July to 16 September 1989)
Writer: Myra Hancock
Artist: David Hine

Tomboyish Weeny begins flat-sharing with Holly in Camden Town while trying to escape the temptation of returning to her former life of theft.

== Straitgate ==
Published: #50-53 (September to December 1990)
Writer: John Smith
Artist/s: Sean Phillips

A young homosexual man wrestles with the stigma of being gay in contemporary Britain.

- Two pages of the story were deemed not fit for publication, and removed.

== Third World War ==
Published: #1-27 (17 September 1988 to 16 September 1989), #29-38 (14 October 1989 to 17 February 1990), #40-51 (17 March to October 1990), #53 (December 1990)
Writers: Pat Mills (all) with Alan Mitchell (#17-21, #24-48 and #53), Malachy Coney (#22-23), Tony Skinner (#49-51)
Artists: Carlos Ezquerra (#1-6, #9-14, #17-18, #20-21), D'Israeli (#7), Angela Kincaid (#8, #15; as Angie Mills), John Hicklenton (#16, #25, #29, #35, #53), Duncan Fegredo (#19, #26), Sean Phillips (#22-24, #27, #31, #33-34), Richard Piers Rayner (#30), Glyn Dillon (#32, #40-44), David Pugh(#36, #49-51), Robert Blackwell (#37, #45-48), Tim Perkins (#38)

In the near future, global corporations are exploiting commercial opportunities in the developing world under the guise of FreeAid, a military security force. Eve Collins, an unemployed university graduate, is conscripted as a soldier working for FreeAid.

- Material from Crisis #1-14 was reprinted for the American market as the 1990 limited series Third World War.

== Trip to Tulum ==
Published: #60-63 (July to October 1991)
Writer: Federico Fellini
Artist: Milo Manara

After falling into a pond chasing Federico Fellini's hat, a beautiful woman finds herself in a strange, magical world.

- Originally published in Italian as Viaggio a Tulum by Rizzoli Libri in 1990. A collected album of the English translation was issued by Catalan Communications the same year.

== Troubled Souls ==
Published: #15-27 (1 April to 16 September 1989
Writer: Garth Ennis
Artist: John McCrea

In 1989 Belfast, protestant youth Tom Boyd finds himself unwittingly drawn into an IRA plot - and becoming friends with catholic volunteer Damian McWilliams.

- Followed by "For a Few Troubles More". Later collected as Troubled Souls - A Crisis Graphic Novel.

== True Faith ==
Published: #29-38 (14 October 1989 to 17 February 1990)
Writer: Garth Ennis
Artist: Warren Pleece

After growing increasingly cynical about the Christians he encounters in day-to-day life, teenager Nigel Gibson becomes fascinated after a chance encounter with Terry Adair, a man who plans to kill God by using a terror campaign against organised religion to draw the deity out into the open.

== Wroom ==
Published: #52-58 (November 1990 to May 1991)
Writer: Igor Goldkind (as IZ)
Artist: Dix

== One-off stories ==
- To Serve and Protect

Published: #21 (24 June 1989)
Writer/artist: Floyd Hughes (as Floyd R. Jones-Hughes)

- The Geek

Published: #22 (8 July 1989)
Writer: Malachy Coney
Artist: Jim McCarthy

- The Student Konstabel

Published: #28 (30 September 1989)
Writer/artist: Phillip Swarbrick

- Her Parents

Published: #31 (11 November 1989)
Writer: Mark Millar
Artist: John McCrea

- The Clicking of High Heels

Published: #32 (25 November 1989)
Writer: Sarah Bromley-Anderson
Artist: Floyd Hughes

- Two Pretty Names

Published: #33 (9 December 1989)
Writers: Si Spencer and Sue Swasey
Artists: Phil Laskey and Carol Swain

- Squirrels in Carroll Street

Published: #34 (23 December 1989)
Writer/artist: Floyd Hughes

- Feedback

Published: #34 (23 December 1989)
Writer/artist: Al Davison

- Didn't You Love My Brother?

Published: #35 (6 January 1990)
Writer: Tony Allen
Artist: David Hine

- Suburban Hell

Published: #36 (20 January 1990)
Writer: Garth Ennis
Artist: Phillip Swarbrick

- Banged Up

Published: #37 (3 February 1990)
Writer: Jack Blackburn
Artist: David Lloyd

- The Death Factory

Published: #39 (3 March 1990)
Writer: Pat Mills
Artist: Sean Phillips

- Produced in association with Amnesty International.

- A Kind of Madness

Published: #39 (3 March 1990)
Writer: Pat Mills
Artist: Sean Phillips

- Produced in association with Amnesty International.

- A Day in the Life

Published: #39 (3 March 1990)
Writer: Igor Goldkind
Artist: Glenn Fabry

- Produced in association with Amnesty International.

- Murky Waters

Published: #40 (17 March 1990)
Writer: James Robinson
Artist: Tony Salmons

- Brighton Gas

Published: #41 (31 March 1990)
Writer: Gary Pleece
Artist: Warren Pleece

- C-Rap

Published: #41 (31 March 1990)
Writer: Peter Hogan
Artist: Edmund Bagwell (as Anoniman)

- Passion and Fire

Published: #42 (14 April 1990)
Writer: Carlos Sampayo
Artist: Oscar Zárate

- Faceless

Published: #42 (14 April 1990)
Writer/artist: Floyd Hughes

- The Ballad of Andrew Brown

Published: #43 (28 April 1990)
Writer: Garth Ennis
Artist: Phil Winslade

- Try a Little Tenderness

Published: #44 (12 May 1990)
Writer: Si Spencer
Artist: Steve Sampson

- Masters of Disguise

Published: #44 (12 May 1990)
Writer/artist: Tomoko Rei Sato

- The Farmer and the Soldiers

Published: #44 (12 May 1990)
Writer: Igor Goldkind
Artists: David Lloyd and Caroline Della Porta

- Felicity

Published: #47 (23 June 1990)
Writer: Chris Standley
Artist: Pete Doherty

- The Soldier & the Painter

Published: #48 (7 July 1990)
Writer: Igor Goldkind
Artist: Phil Winslade

- Chicken Run

Published: #49 (21 July 1989)
Writer: Gary Pleece
Artist: Warren Pleece

- No Messin' with Rupert

Published: #50 (September 1990)
Writer: Carlos Sampayo
Artist: Oscar Zárate

- Your Death, My Life

Published: #50 (September 1990)
Writer/artist: Milo Manara

- Suddenly, Last Week

Published: #51 (October 1990)
Writer: Nicholas Vince
Artist: Paul Johnson

- The Wall

Published: #51 (October 1990)
Writer: Tony Allen
Artist: Enki Bilal

- The Power of the Pen

Published: #51 (October 1990)
Writer/artist: Alberto Breccia

- Prisoner of Justice

Published:#52 (November 1990)
Writer: Alan Mitchell
Artist: Glenn Fabry

- The Happiest Days

Published: #52 (November 1990)
Writer: Martine d'Ellard
Artist: Caroline Della Porta

- The School

Published: #53 (December 1990)
Writer: Martine d'Ellard
Artist: Ed Hillyer

- In Cages, There is No Escape

Published: #54 (January 1991)
Writer/artist: Paul Johnson

- Passing Through

Published: #55 (February 1991
Writer/artist: Miguelanxo Prado

- Lord Jim

Published: #59 (June 1991)
Writer: Igor Goldkind
Artist: Steve Sampson

- Unlikely Stories, Mostly: End Game

Published: #60 (July 1991)
Writer/artist: Miguelanxo Prado

- Light Me

Published: #61 (August 1991)
Writer: Garth Ennis
Artist: Phil Winslade

- Worms

Published: #62 (September 1991)
Writer/artist: David Hine

- Waddle on the Wild Side

Published: #62 (September 1991)
Writer/artist: Al Davison

- Charlie Lives with Fan and Snuggles

Published: #62 (September 1991)
Writer: Garth Ennis
Artist: Ian Oldham

- Body Snatchers

Published: #62 (September 1991)
Writers: Ian Abnett & Alan Cowsill
Artist: Andrew Currie

- Strange Hotel

Published: #62 (September 1991)
Writer: Si Spencer
Artist: Adrian Dungworthy

- The Big Voice

Published: #63 (October 1991)
Writer: Nick Abadzis
Artist: Edmund Bagwell (as Edmund Perryman)

- Operation Massacre

Published: #63 (October 1991)
Writer: Gabriel López
Artist: Francisco Solano López

- Commuter's Journey

Published: #63 (October 1991)
Writer/artist: Nick Abadzis
