= Bible John - A Forensic Meditation =

British comic book story

- "Bible John" on the cover of Crisis #57, dated April 1991; art by Daniel Vallely.
- Publisher: Fleetway Publications
- Publication date: March – August 1991
- Title(s): Crisis #56-61; March to August 1991

Creative team
- Writer: Grant Morrison
- Artist: Daniel Vallely
- Letterer: Elitta Fell
- Editor: Michael Bennent

"Bible John - A Forensic Meditation" is a creator-owned British comic story. It was originally published in the adult-oriented comic Crisis between May and August 1991. Written by Grant Morrison with art by Daniel Vallely, the story is a multimedia study of the unsolved Bible John murders carried out in Glasgow in the 1968 and 1969.

== Creation ==
The story was one of several commissioned by new Crisis editor Michael Bennent as he took over the reins from Steve MacManus. It was the first Grant Morrison story written specifically for the title, which had previously printed the Morrison/Steve Yeowell collaboration "The New Adventures of Hitler" after its original parent publication folded, while the final part of Morrison/Rian Hughes revisionist Dan Dare strip "Dare" also saw print in Crisis after sister comic Revolver was absorbed.

Morrison claimed to have written the story using a Ouija board and the story made no attempt to solve the murders, instead focusing on a critique in mankind's attempts to find rationality in searching for the killer.

Artist Daniel Vallely had been a bandmate of Morrison in The Mixers and gained notice working on the first issue of Saviour, Mark Millar's professional debut for British publisher Trident Comics. For "Bible John" he deployed a collage technique, similar to that of Dave McKean.

== Publishing history ==
By the time "Bible John" saw publication, Crisis and publisher Fleetway Publications were in dire financial straits as sales for the title fell and pressure grew on company owner Robert Maxwell. Initially a fortnightly, Crisis was now on a monthly schedule. "Bible John" was serialised across eight such issues, dated March to August 1991; the comic's editorial page introduced it as a 'prosepoemessay'. Vallely would ultimately leave comics not long afterwards to pursue a career in photo journalism. As of 2026 the story has not been reprinted since its run in Crisis.

== Reception ==
Comic Book Resources listed "Bible John" as one of the '8 Best British Grant Morrison Comics'. In the introduction to Killer Komix 2, a 2000 anthology of modern crime comics published by Critical Vision, comics scholar Roger Sabin pointed to "Bible John" as one of several comics of the time that had covered serial killers, alongside Alan Moore and Eddie Campbell's From Hell while Marc Singer identified many of the story's themes as being a precursor to Morrison's 1994 graphic novel The Mystery Play.
