= Bible John (disambiguation) =

Bible John is an unidentified serial killer active in Glasgow in the late 1960s.

Bible John may also refer to:

- Bible John-A Forensic Meditation, a 1991 comic book series by Grant Morrison based on the Bible John killings
- John Carik, a comic book character owned by Marvel Comics who goes by the nickname "Bible John"
