= Rogan Gosh (comics) =

- Cover of the Rogan Gosh collected edition by Brendan McCarthy.
- Created by: Peter Milligan; Brendan McCarthy

Publication information
- Publisher: Fleetway
- Schedule: Monthly
- Title(s): Revolver #1-6
- Formats: Original material for the series has been published as a strip in the comics anthology(s) Revolver.
- Original language: English
- Genre: Science fiction
- Publication date: July – December 1990

Creative team
- Writer(s): Peter Milligan
- Artist(s): Brendan McCarthy
- Letterer(s): Tom Frame
- Editor(s): Art Young

Reprints
- Collected editions
- Rogan Gosh: ISBN 1-56389-143-3

Rogan Gosh is the title of a British comic book story written by Peter Milligan and illustrated by Brendan McCarthy. Originally serialised in the 2000 AD spin-off title Revolver in 1990, it was later collected into a single edition by the Vertigo imprint of DC Comics in 1994.

The name is a play on rogan josh, a Kashmiri curry dish.

== Overview ==
Rogan Gosh is the titular character for the stories, who is a time-traveller from the future.

Described as an "Indian science fiction series", Rogan Gosh was one of the flagship stories in Revolver along with Grant Morrison's version of Dan Dare. The story is an example of Milligan and McCarthy's post-modernist psychedelic style of storyline described by some readers as confusing or challenging. The Washington Post wrote that the story "abruptly changes direction every few pages". Both creators describe the works as partly autobiographical.

After Revolver was cancelled the story remained out of print until Vertigo released the 1994 collected edition.

== Collected editions ==
The story has been collected into a trade paperback:

- Rogan Gosh: Star of the East (Little, Brown, ISBN 1-85386-253-3, Vertigo, ISBN 1-56389-143-3)
