= Crisis (British comics) =

British comic

- The cover of Crisis #1 (dated 17 September 1988) featuring Eve Collins of "Third World War". Art by Carlos Ezquerra, design by Rian Hughes.

Publication information
- Publisher: Fleetway Publications
- Schedule: Fortnightly #1 to #49 (17 September 1988 to 21 July 1989); Monthly #50 to #63 (September 1990 to October 1991)
- Format: Ongoing series
- Publication date: 17 September 1988 – October 1991
- No. of issues: 63

Creative team
- Created by: Steve MacManus
- Editor(s): Steve MacManus (1989–1991); Michael Bennent (1991)

Collected editions
- The Complete New Statesmen: ISBN 9781853862175
- Third World War Book One: ISBN 9781781087510

Crisis (also known as 2000 AD Presents: Crisis in early issues) was a British comic anthology published by Fleetway Publications from 17 September 1988 to October 1991, initially fortnightly and later monthly. Designed to appeal to older readers than other Fleetway titles in order to take advantage of a boom in interest in 'adult' comics, Crisis featured overtly political and complex stories; one issue was even produced in conjunction with Amnesty International.

Although branded under the umbrella of the successful 2000 AD, the comic was not a sales success and – despite periodic attempts at revamps – was cancelled after 63 issues. However, it did feature early work by a number of notable British comics creators, including Garth Ennis, John McCrea, Mark Millar, Grant Morrison and John Smith.

== Creation ==
=== Background ===
The breakout success of Alan Moore and Dave Gibbons' Watchmen and Frank Miller's The Dark Knight Returns had greatly boosted the view that comic books (or as mainstream press outlets often called them, 'graphic novels' (Note: While the precise definition of 'graphic novel' is subjective, it is often used in mainstream discourse to definite comics or collected editions aimed at an older readership; it has been criticised by some as an attempt by the comics industry to pander to more respectable demographics.)) were a credible form of entertainment on both sides of the Atlantic. Coverage in national newspapers and influential magazines such as The Face and Time Out - together with the high profile of many of the creators involved in what was referred to in the comics industry as the 'British Invasion' - seemed to point to a potential audience of older British comic readers that were not being catered for by 2000 AD, despite the title's growing maturity. While comics aimed at older readers existed in Britain they were either underground small-press titles like the Hunt Emerson-edited Street Comix or humour titles like the famous Viz; attempts like Dez Skinn's Warrior had received critical acclaim from comics readers but failed to break through to wider success. However, Igor Goldkind had produced British trade paperback editions of Watchmen and The Dark Knight Returns for Titan Comics that replicated the commercial success and critical attention the titles had received in America.

The success also added to the growing discourse on creator ownership in comics. IPC Magazines, owners of 2000 AD and one of the most dominant comics publishers in the UK, operated a model whereby creators signed away their rights under a work for hire agreement. The company had long justified this stance by paying generous page rates in return to contributors signing away all ownership to their work - which allowed the company's material to be reprinted or syndicated overseas without royalty payments, while popular characters such as Judge Dredd were entirely owned by the publisher. (Note: IPC's main rival DC Thomson followed the same model and also did not credit creative staff for the most part; major American publishers like Marvel and DC Comics also generally used work for hire, though the American industry generally did credit contributors.) Until 1977 - when Kevin O'Neill was able to get credits into 2000 AD - IPC didn't even attribute the work of its creators. The growth of the comics industry fandom with specialised publications like The Comics Journal threw a greater spotlight on the poor treatment of the likes of Jerry Siegel, Joe Shuster, Jack Kirby and Steve Englehart, leading to a rise in 'independent' comic companies such as Pacific and Eclipse, who allowed authors and artists to retain rights to their creations - as well as Marvel Comics establishing their Epic Comics imprint.

Meanwhile, 2000 AD editor Steve MacManus quit the title, citing burnout after an initial temporary stint replacing Kelvin Gosnell in 1979 had turned into a decade-long residency. MacManus had been instrumental in ensuring 2000 AD repeatedly bucked sales trends and weathered the downturn in British comic sales of the 1980s which had claimed many of IPC's titles, and was persuaded to stay on by editorial director John Sanders in order to hand 2000 AD to new editor Richard Burton. With that done, MacManus was then to take a lengthy working holiday to America in March 1987, to see how IPC could launch a title to take advantage of the public interest in adult-orientated comics.

=== Development ===
MacManus proposed a new 32-page full colour fortnightly; each issue would contain two 14-page chapters of ongoing stories, with a flip cover to allow both to be displayed equally. An additional "From the makers of 2000 AD" graphic was to be placed in the masthead. Each month's output would then be licensed to an American publisher, combined into a 28-page American-format comic and exported. While the cover price of 65p was twice that of 2000 AD, it would match that comic's monthly costs and was also the same as that of imported American titles, which were gaining greater traction in the UK through outlets like Forbidden Planet and other comic shops.

Before MacManus left for America in 1987, there were rumours that the IPC Youth Group was up for sale as the parent company looked to divest itself of comics, and that the controversial tycoon Robert Maxwell was weighing a bid. When he returned, MacManus found this had gone ahead; the IPC Youth Group had been renamed Fleetway Publications (Note: A name previously used by the forerunner of IPC between 1959 and 1969) and was now part of Maxwell Communication Corporation. Initially little seemed to have changed, and MacManus continued work on the planned new title. Sanders had suggested a superhero angle to the stories to allow better marketability in the potentially lucrative American market, and the success of Grant Morrison and Steve Yeowell's 2000 AD strip "Zenith" showed MacManus that the genre could be handled in an adult-orientated way by British creators. He began brainstorming an idea where in a future America (incorporating Britain as the 51st state for "local colour") had a government-sanctioned superhuman in each state. Wanting to promote upcoming talent he commissioned John Smith, who at 20 already had experience on DC Thomson's science fiction title Starblazer and 2000 AD (including "Tyranny Rex") to write what would become "New Statesmen". Stalwart IPC writer Alan Grant would later claim MacManus boasted he planned to break the "stranglehold" Grant and writing partner John Wagner had on British comics.

For the second story, MacManus reached out to the experienced Pat Mills, who was among those leading demands for better treatment of British comics creators. He had been working for IPC for most of the 1970s, first of all on girls' comics before devising weeklies Battle Picture Weekly, Action and 2000 AD for the company, for which he received little recompense beyond the initial payments. Mills became particularly disillusioned following the treatment of his acclaimed Battle story "Charley's War"; the writer requested a research budget for the strip's planned second arc, which would move the story to World War II. This was refused, and Mills quit the strip in protest; IPC simply assigned staff writer Scott Goodall to continue the story, and the work-for-hire contract gave Mills no capacity to object.

To help work on the title (to be named 50/50 to reflect the split content), MacManus recruited Goldkind from Titan. The latter acted as a sounding board for the proposed Mills strips, and their discussions on global corporations and brands led to Mills conceiving "Third World War". Goldkind also suggested graphic artist Rian Hughes, who mixed agency work with small-press comics, to design the 2000 AD Presents 50/50: Third World War half of the flip comic; Steven Cook - who had a strong record, having produced successful redesigns for Starburst, Doctor Who Magazine and most recently 2000 AD - for the 2000 AD Presents 50/50: New Statesman half. However, management felt the title was not "sales friendly" and furthermore were concerned that the split format would cause concern for newsagents, which still made up the primary market for British comics. 50/50 was retitled Crisis at Goldkind's suggestion (MacManus would later recall management weren't enthusiastic about the new title either), and Hughes was retasked to create the overall look of the exterior as well as the interior for "Third World War", while Cook would style the interior for "New Statesmen". Hughes used experience from working in the music industry to ensure the various promotional materials and the comic itself were kept under the same "stylistic umbrella".

MacManus' research in America also saw him get hold of copies of contracts offered by DC Comics and Epic, and melded ideas from both with guidelines from the Society of British Authors to come up with creator contracts for the title. These retained Fleetway's copyright on the material and a flat rate, but added an 8% royalty for sales beyond the title's break-even point, for collected edition reprints and - crucially - 35% of net profits for overseas syndication, as well as provisions for further payments in the event of merchandising or adaptations for other media. While MacManus would later acknowledge the amounts involved were not "earth-shattering", it was a major step forward for the company. The same terms were also offered to the artists, and as a result Crisis was able to land renowned artists for both strips. The experienced Carlos Ezquerra, who had worked for IPC for a decade (most notably on "Strontium Dog") signed on for "Third World War" and Jim Baikie (another veteran, who had received a major boost in acclaim following his work on 2000 AD's "Skizz" with Alan Moore) would draw "New Statesmen". MacManus recalled that the pair were the first choices of both writers; however, Mills has stated he wanted Ian Gibson first, but the artist objected to some of Eve's actions and turned the strip down.

== Publication history ==
=== Launch ===
British comics generally drummed up publicity for a new title by including a free gift with early issues and prominent retailer displays in return for early issues being supplied on a sale or return basis until the title found its average circulation. Feeling it would go against the grain of the title's intended older audience, MacManus eschewed the free gift while Goldkind worked on a publicity campaign, including a launch at a bar in North London; Mills later felt this flew in the face of the comic's contents. The event was a success however, as the publication of the first issue (dated 17 September 1988) gained coverage in The Economist, The Jewish Chronicle, The Scotsman and Timeout, though the reviews themselves were mixed. Much of the coverage labelled Crisis as a political comic, something MacManus felt was only partly true but was happy to take in the name of publicity. The creators were sent on a cross-country signing tour, culminating in a prominent appearance at the 1988 United Kingdom Comic Art Convention.

At the same time Crisis was launching, 2000 AD alumni Brett Ewins and Steve Dillon were priming the similarly themed Deadline, published by Deadline Publications Ltd and underwritten by Tom Astor. MacManus recalled there was some sentiment that the larger Fleetway were trying to steamroller a potential rival with corporate muscle, something he denies being a conscious choice. The press campaign saw the first issue of Crisis sell an impressive 80,000 copies. However, despite the expensive launch and attempt at better production values (including all-colour artwork) the comic was still printed on newsprint stock like the company's weeklies, something both Mills and Hughes would later criticise. MacManus recalled the early response as polarised - "those that liked it loved it, and those that didn't ridiculed it."

Sales for the second issue fell to 50,000 - while a drop after the first issue was industry standard, this was more severe than expected. At the same time Maxwell's underlings drastically cut back on the numbers of staff and general costs at Fleetway, with most of the staff moved to work-from-home freelancers to reduce costs. MacManus was retained as a permanent employee, with the full-time staff relocated from King's Reach Tower to offices in Camden. By this point Crisis' sales had evened out at 30,000 per issue, and MacManus found himself having to defend what management felt was an underperformance.

=== Relaunch ===
After research revealed most newsagents were displaying Crisis with children's titles, MacManus was able to negotiate a £20,000 budget for a relaunch of the title with Crisis #13. He would later recall he convinced management of Crisis' topical nature by pointing to the Enya's UK number 1 single "Orinoco Flow", with the choral refrain of "Save the whale". It was only later he discovered the lyric was "Sail away", but his mistake wasn't picked up on. The relaunch would include information about placing it with the likes of Viz in newsagent trade publications, copies being inserted in the NME. (Note: Deadline was receiving good notices for aligning itself with the British alternative rock scene.) MacManus also decided to expand the contents to three stories, with the first 'book' of "New Statesmen" ended and the strip rested. MacManus and Goldkind went through submissions from readers and quickly hit on one submitted by Belfast-based writer Garth Ennis, set around the Troubles in Northern Ireland and titled "Troubled Souls". It was felt that running two long, complex serials concurrently had been intimidating to casual readers. After being contacted, Ennis not only produced a full script for the opening episode within two days but also suggested his friend John McCrea as artist; a deal was rapidly struck. The other new selected was "Sticky Fingers" by Myra Hancock and David Hine, about a contemporary Camden shoplifter turned carpenter.

The change in format was also influenced by the lack of the hoped-for American distributor interest. Marvel and DC had both passed, and instead the reprints would be handled by Dez Skinn via the new Fleetway Quality imprint. "New Statesmen" and "Third World War" were planned as mini-series alongside titles based on 2000 AD material, with the enterprise being given a promotional budget of $40,000. The low production values of many reprints was criticised in some quarters.

More behind-the-scenes disruption came when Sanders, tiring of Maxwell's unpredictability, left Fleetway. (Note: He was later rehired as an editorial consultant, but would have no more to do with the day-to-day comics operation)MacManus was given the new title of group editor of the 2000 AD Group - consisting of Crisis, 2000 AD and the latter's ancillary titles such as reprint title The Best of 2000 A.D. Monthly, specials and annuals. The Crisis relaunch stabilised sales, and MacManus continued to incorporate new talent to the comic - Sean Phillips and Duncan Fegredo contributed to "Third World War", while the former also contributed an epilogue to "New Statesmen". However, Ezquerra had left the comic, and no permanent replacement was found to draw "Third World War", which went through many hands as a result. From Crisis #21 the comic introduced a one-off slot that would see contributions from numerous up-and-coming creators including Mark Millar, Si Spencer, Glenn Fabry, Peter Hogan, Phil Winslade and Peter Doherty. However, the influx of so many inexperienced creators would cause some scheduling problems.

=== Controversies ===
An advertisement for the cancelled serialisation of "Skin" in the pages of Crisis. Art by Brendan McCarthy.

MacManus commissioned "Skin" by Peter Milligan, who had spent most of the eighties maintaining an unlikely balance between experimental creator-owned work such as anthology Strange Days with IPC freelance scripts for stories like "Action Force" and "M.A.S.K.". Illustrated by Brendan McCarthy, "Skin" was an uncompromising look at the life of a young skinhead with a birth defect, and was set to begin in Crisis #28. Hugely enthusiastic about the story, MacManus described it as being "at the cutting edge of British comics" in the pages of British comics magazine Speakeasy. However, Fleetway's printers refused to run the story, and the company's legal advisors suggested it could be considered obscene under UK law. Sanders' replacement as managing director, John Davidge, felt the story was "lacking in taste" and ordered it to be replaced. MacManus found the decision absurd, given that Maxwell's publishing empire included pornographic magazines. The story would instead be published in 1992 as a graphic novel by American publisher Tundra. Ennis would later feel the "Skin" controversy led to an "atmosphere of nervous caution" at Crisis.

Instead Crisis #28 - which also saw a price increase to 75p - introduced Philip Bond's "Angels Among Us" in place of "Sticky Fingers". It also saw a prelude to the planned second book of "New Statesmen", after which no more was heard about the story. The following issue saw the start of Ennis' second submission, "True Faith", an acerbic assault on organised religion; he was paired with artist Warren Pleece, whose work the self-published (along with brother Gary) Velocity had caught MacManus' eye. Issue 28 also included a one-off strip by Phillip Swarbrick, an exiled South African writer who had written for New Statesman, who related his experiences after being recruited to South Africa's police service.

In his new role as Group Editor, MacManus also explored the idea of producing monthly ongoing supplementary titles to 2000 AD and Crisis, in the form of Judge Dredd Megazine and Revolver, and got the green light after Fleetway struck gold with a licensed Teenage Mutant Ninja Turtles comic. Several stories from Crisis were compiled for the British book market, overseen by Mark Cox, with design work from Hughes and Cook. However, while the serialisation of "True Faith" had passed largely without comment, the collected edition drew mainstream condemnation and was withdrawn after two months on sale, reportedly on the orders of Maxwell himself. The Economist ran an article on the controversy on 19 January 1991, speculating that "no one would think twice about it" if the story was a novel, and felt that the furore was largely caused by the ongoing belief in the press that the comic medium was still exclusively aimed at children.

=== Amnesty International and Hitler ===
Crisis #39 (dated 3 March 1990) was produced in conjunction with charity Amnesty International, based on stories from case histories the pressure group had encountered. The idea was pitched to MacManus by Sarah Sellwood of 'public art service' Art and Society. Mills was hugely enthusiastic about the idea, which tied into his hopes for the format of Crisis. The issue was the first to be distributed directly to the American market, rather than only as an import. Mills and Goldnick hosted a panel at the Institute for Contemporary Art were both were tactfully non-committal about whether the choleric Maxwell - whose close links to the likes of Romanian dictator Nicolae Ceaușescu were coming under increasing scrutiny - was aware of the issue's contents. Later Mills would recall however that Maxwell rebuffed complaints from the Jewish Board of Deputies about one story's depiction of the actions of Israeli authorities, despite himself being of Jewish extraction. Copies of the issue scheduled for export to Apartheid South Africa were also opposed by solicitors representing condemned prisoners in Upington, who feared it would have negative consequences for their fate until they read an advance copy. The issue also saw a price increase to £1, forced by falling sales - which also saw the abandonment of plans to produce issues in conjunction with the Ark Trust and Campaign Against Arms Trade as Crisis tried to find a profitable format. The comic's circulation had fallen to 20,000 by this stage

The following issue saw Mills pick Alan Mitchell as a co-writer on "Third World War", wanting his perspective as a black man to ensure the story rang true, while Ennis began sequel "For a Few Troubles More", which the author intended to be much more light-hearted; as such it was based on the supporting characters Dougie and Ivor from "Troubled Souls". Some years later Ennis would revisit the pair again for Dicks. Crisis #46 saw another controversial strip, "The New Adventures of Hitler". The story, created by the "Zenith" team of Morrison and Yeowell, had been created for Scottish magazine Cut and was based on the claims of Adolf Hitler's sister-in-law Bridget Dowling that the future Nazi leader had lived in Liverpool for a period. Morrison used this as a device to satirise Thatcherism but some Cut staff objected to the use of Nazi imagery for shock value, and the dispute was leaked to the tabloid press, who reacted in their usual sensationalist fashion. The Cut serialisation was ended after three four-page episodes had been published, with the short-lived magazine folding. In a statement inadvertently given to The Sun newspaper, Morrison used Crisis as a negative comparison his aim for the strip; nevertheless shortly afterwards they and Yeowell accepted an offer for the strip to be printed in the Fleetway title. Serialised in Crisis #46-49, "The New Adventures of Hitler" ran in the comic without incident.

=== Merger with Revolver ===
Despite the press attention, sales of Crisis failed to pick up, and from #50 the title switched to monthly publication. The market for adult comics – which included Crisis, Revolver, Deadline, Marvel UK's Strip and Meltdown, and John Brown Publishing's Blast! – was contracting rapidly, with the titles fighting among themselves over a dwindling readership. Over the course of the first two monthly issues, MacManus handed the editorship of Crisis over to Michael Bennent, who commissioned new stories "Straitgate" (by John Smith and Sean Phillips, #50 to #53), "Insiders" (by Millar and Paul Grist, #54 to #59) and "Bible John - A Forensic Meditation" (by Morrison and Daniel Vallely, #56 to #61), while "Third World War" ended in #53. (Note: Mills would later revisit Finn, a character from "Third World War", in the pages of 2000 AD.) Revolver meanwhile lasted just seven issues before being incorporated into Crisis from #56; the merge brought the conclusion of Morrison and Hughes' revisionist "Dare" and Paul Neary/Steve Parkhouse story "Happenstance and Kismet" but few extra readers. To boost profitability, Crisis began printing European stories in a bid to cut costs, including Federico Fellini/Milo Manara collaboration "Trip to Tulum".

=== Cancellation ===
Sales continued to drop and the reprints were unpopular with the remaining readers. Crisis' decline took place among increasing press scrutiny into Maxwell's business practices, particularly over his links to Mossad, misappropriation of company pension funds, and defaults on loan payments. As costs were cut across the company, Crisis was cancelled after #63 (cover-dated October 1991); a month later Maxwell died after falling off of his luxury yacht off the Canary Islands. His business empire collapsed rapidly afterwards, due to the calling in of massive loans and misuse of company pension fund assets, with Fleetway being sold to Danish publishers Egmont.

Rebellion Developments purchased 2000 AD and Judge Dredd Megazine from Egmont in 2001, and the other Fleetway Publications they still owned in 2016, including the publisher-owned portions of the rights to Crisis. They have since issued collected editions of "Third World War" on their Treasury of British Comics imprint, with the first book in January 2020 and the second in January 2021. Promoting the former, Rebellion editor Oliver Pickles felt the story's themes were as relevant as they had been on publication. He also suggested he would like to issue a collected version of "New Statesmen", but the large quantities of the older edition available on the secondary market meant a new version wasn't in the company's immediate plans.

== Reception ==
TV Cream's Ultimate Guide To 70's and 80's Pop Culture felt Crisis suffered from convoluted storylines and an "overly serious demeanour", relating that "right from the off it was clear the hip audience it was reaching out for didn't like the comic's preachy tone". In a 2011 piece for Comics Bulletin, Regie Rigby echoed many of the same concerns, feeling Crisis would "denounce you as a 'counter revolutionary running dog lackey of the evil global capitalist military industrial complex' if you didn't instantly agree to join it on the barricades."

== Legacy ==
Pat Mills has frequently been scathing about Crisis and many of those involved in the title in subsequent interviews. He would later blame its failure on a lack of sincerity behind some of the writing, feeling it was diluted by "fashionable bandwagoning", the introduction of European reprints and what he perceived to be a change "into some sub-version of Deadline". He also felt the comic lacked a unifying theme beyond "let's be trendy" and took aim at MacManus by stating "There're only a few people who can actually create successful comics. The editor of Crisis was not amongst them." In 2021 he described Crisis as "putting style above substance, cool above inner beliefs. Maybe that works for some American comic readers, but I think Brits are rather more demanding. We need truth."

Together with Wagner, Grant, Kevin O'Neill and Mike McMahon, Mills devised the similarly themed Toxic! in 1991, largely designed in response to the likes of Crisis with an emphasis on bad taste. Toxic!'s life was much the same as that of Crisis; a promising start derailed by an inconsistent line-up, inexperienced creators, the impact of declining sales on providing consistent quality and behind-the-scenes infighting.

== Spin-offs ==
- New Statesmen (5 issue mini-series, 1989)
- Third World War (6 issue mini-series, September 1990 to February 1991)
- Crisis Presents the Xpresso Special (2 editions, 1991)
- Crisis Presents the Revolver Romance Special (1 edition, 1991)

== Collected editions ==
Title	ISBN	Publisher	Release date	Contents
The Complete New Statesmen	9781853862175	Fleetway Quality	November 1990	Material from Crisis #1-14 and #28
Troubled Souls - A Crisis Graphic Novel	9781853862175	Fleetway Publications	1990	Material from Crisis #15-20 and #22-27
True Faith	9781853862014	Fleetway Publications	1990	Material from Crisis #29-38.
For a Few Troubles More - A Crisis Accident	9781853862083	Fleetway Publications	1991	Material from Crisis #40-43 and #45-46
True Faith	9781563893780	Vertigo Comics	1997	Material from Crisis #29-38.
Third World War Book One	9781781087510	Rebellion Publishing	9 January 2020	Material from Crisis #1-14
Third World War Book Two: Back to Babylon	9781781089293	Rebellion Publishing	5 January 2021	Material from Crisis #15-24, #26-27 and #30-34
