= Brendan McCarthy =

British artist and designer

- Born: 1955 (age 70–71) London
- Areas: Writer, Penciller, Artist, Colourist
- Notable works: Shade, the Changing Man; Highlander; Rogan Gosh; Mad Max: Fury Road

Brendan McCarthy is a British artist and designer who has worked for comic books, film and television. He co-wrote the film Mad Max: Fury Road. He is the brother of Jim McCarthy.

== Life and career ==
=== Early life and work ===
Brendan McCarthy was born in London. After leaving Chelsea Art College in London, where he studied film and Fine Art Painting, McCarthy decided to become a full-time artist. He created the independent comic book Sometime Stories with art college friend Brett Ewins. His first paid commercial work was a one-page strip Electrick Hoax in the British weekly music paper Sounds with another art-school escapee, writer Peter Milligan, in 1978. McCarthy held a solo exhibition of paintings, drawings and collages at the Car Breaker Gallery in London, a squat in Ladbroke Grove's Republic of Frestonia.

=== Comics ===
McCarthy started working for 2000 AD, including runs on Judge Dredd, as well as creating Sooner or Later and post-apocalyptic surfing story Freakwave with Peter Milligan. In 1983 McCarthy collaborated with Milligan and Brett Ewins on punk indie series Strange Days, published by Eclipse Comics. He created and drew a two-issue series featuring his alternative "media-brat superhero" Paradax from the anthology.

Cover of the Rogan Gosh collected edition.

Over the next few years he worked for the 2000 AD spin off titles Crisis and Revolver. For Revolver, McCarthy drew Rogan Gosh (later compiled into a single edition by the Vertigo imprint of DC Comics). For Crisis, he originated the story and art for Skin which proved to be highly controversial, with Crisis refusing to release the story and their printers refusing to print it due to claims of it being "morbidly obscene". The story was eventually being released by Kevin Eastman's Tundra Publishing in 1992.

He designed the characters for Grant Morrison's Zenith strip in 1987, Doom Patrol (creating Danny The Street) and on Morrison and Mark Millar's Marvel series Skrull Kill Krew. He also produced covers and character designs for Pete Milligan's revamp of Shade, the Changing Man. In 2005 he released a limited edition book of his art Swimini Purpose , which is now a rare collector's item. In 2006, his work was featured in the final issue of DC Comics' Solo. His comic had new takes on characters such as The Flash, Batman, and Johnny Sorrow and he considers the single issue to be one of his best works.

In 2009, McCarthy was commissioned by Marvel Comics to create a new take on Doctor Strange. The mini-series was ultimately published as Spider-Man: Fever in April 2010. Brendan returned to 2000 AD in 2010 on a Judge Dredd story with Al Ewing, spoofing Dr Who, and with whom he created a popular new story, The Zaucer of Zilk, which he has described as a cross between Harry Potter and Aladdin Sane: "A glammatronic phantasmagoria." The series debuted in March 2012. It was reprinted by IDW in a new format with both issues quickly selling out. The Zaucer of Zilk appeared in many "best of the year" lists.

In 2013 he published The Best of Milligan & McCarthy, a brand new collection of comic works co-created with Peter Milligan, through Dark Horse Comics. McCarthy wrote and drew a graphic novel titled Dream Gang for the publisher that was released in July 2016. A collection of his classic Judge Dredd stories from over 35 years of work was collected by IDW in hardcover and released in January 2017. McCarthy completed artwork on a new Chopper strip for Rebellion Publishing in 2018 and a sequel to The Zaucer of Zilk, published in 2020 in 2000AD. His final strip for the magazine, Nakka of the S.T.A.R.S., was published in 2021.

=== Film and television ===
Beginning in the 1980s McCarthy has worked extensively in TV, producing designs for an ultimately unmade Dan Dare live-action television series, as well as storyboards for the Arabian animated TV series New Babylon and Jim Henson'sThe Storyteller.

He was concept designer/board artist on the films Highlander, the first live-action Teenage Mutant Ninja Turtles film, Lost in Space and The Borrowers. He was also hired by Saturday Night Live producer Lorne Michaels to write and design for the film Coneheads.

McCarthy spent much of the remainder of the 1990s working in film and television, most notably as the production designer of the animated science fiction TV series ReBoot and as the character creator for War Planets. In 1997 he was then asked to co-write and design Mad Max: Fury Road with director George Miller after meeting in Hollywood. The film was shot in 2012, with McCarthy visiting the set in Namibia. It was released in 2015, with the final film receiving many "best of the year" awards including six Oscars. It was McCarthy's first Hollywood screenplay, and he was the original Production Designer on the movie. The pair also created and co-wrote a new animated feature called Fur Brigade.

== Bibliography ==
Interior comic work includes:

- Sometime Stories #1 (of 2 produced) (script and art, with Brett Ewins, Broglia Press, 1977)
- Sounds: "The Electrick Hoax" (script and art, with Peter Milligan, Spotlight Publications, 1977–1978)
- 2000 AD (anthology, IPC Media/Fleetway/Rebellion):
  - Tharg's Future Shocks:
    - "Robot Repairs" (with Robert Flynn and Brett Ewins, in #37–38, 1977)
    - "Stasis" (with Charles Swift and Brett Ewins, in #54, 1978)
    - "The English/Phlondrutian Phrase Book" (with Alan Moore, in #214, 1981)
    - "Sixty Hours that Shook the World" (as R. Jones, with Peter Milligan, in #391, 1984)
    - "Bad Maxwell!" (as J. Roberts, with Peter Milligan, in #402, 1985)
    - "Do You Copy?" (with Peter Milligan, in Sci-Fi Special '85, 1985)
  - "Encounter: The Day of the Phoenix" (text story by Oniano, with Brett Ewins, in #56, 1978)
  - Walter the Wobot (with Gary Rice, in #82, 84–85 and Judge Dredd Annual '81, 1978–1980)
  - Strontium Dog:
    - In Starlord, 2000 AD's short-lived sister title:
      - "Kane's Kolossal Kasino" (with Bill Henry, in Summer Special '78, 1978)
      - "The Demon Maker – Master of Chaos!" (with T. B. Grover, in #17, 1978)
    - "The Town that Died of Shame" (with Alan Grant and Colin MacNeil, in Sci-Fi Special '88, 1988)
  - Judge Dredd:
    - "Bring Me the Head of Judge Dredd!" (with John Howard and Brett Ewins, in #88, 1978)
    - "The Day the Law Died! Parts 5, 17" (with John Howard and Brett Ewins, in #93 and 105, 1978–1979)
    - "Untitled" (with an uncredited writer and Brett Ewins, in Annual '79, 1978)
    - "New Year is Cancelled" (with John Howard, in #146, 1980)
    - "The Wally Squad! Parts 2–3" (with T. B. Grover and Brett Ewins, in #391–392, 1984)
    - "Riders on the Storm!" (with T. B. Grover and Tony Riot, in #472–473, 1986)
    - "Atlantis" (with T. B. Grover, in #485–488, 1986)
    - "Report to the Chief Judge" (with T. B. Grover and Tony Riot, in Judge Dredd Annual '87, 1986)
    - "The Witness" (with Alan Grant and Steve Whitaker, in #500–501, 1986)
    - "Blood Donor" (with Alan Grant, in #519, 1987)
    - "Oz – Parts 5, 7–8, 14–16" (with Alan Grant, in #549, 551–552 and 558–560, 1987–1988)
    - "She-Devils!" (with John Wagner, Alan Grant, Brett Ewins and Tony Riot, in Annual '88, 1987)
    - "Full Mental Jacket, Parts 4–5" (with John Wagner and Steve Parkhouse, in #581–582, 1988)
    - "Spock's Mock Chocs" (with Alan Grant, Steve Whitaker and Jamie Hewlett, in #614, 1989)
    - "Doctor What?" (with Al Ewing, in #1712–1713, 2010)
    - "Night Zoom" (with John Wagner, in Sci-Fi Special '16, 2016)
    - "Hoverods" (with T. C. Eglington, in #2033–2034, 2017)
  - ABC Warriors (with Pat Mills, in #120 and 127–128, 1979)
  - Ro-Jaw's Robo-Tales: "Ye First Robote" (with Gary Rice, in #166, 1980)
  - Sooner or Later (with Peter Milligan and Tony Riot, in #468–486, 488–496 and 498–499, 1986)
  - Zaucer of Zilk:
    - "Zaucer of Zilk" (with Al Ewing, in #1775–1784, 2012)
    - "A Zaucerful of Zecrets" (with Peter Hogan, in #2162–2169 and 2171–2173, 2019–2020)
  - Tharg's 3rillers Present: "Nakka of the S.T.A.R.S" (with Roger Langridge, in #2222–2224, 2021)
- Vanguard Illustrated #1–3: "Freakwave!" (script and art, with Peter Milligan, anthology, Pacific, 1983–1984)
- Scream! #7: "The Punch and Judy Horror Show" (with James Nicholas, anthology, IPC Media, 1984)
- Strange Days #1–3 (with Peter Miligan and Brett Ewins, anthology, Eclipse, 1984–1985)
- Paradax! #1–2 (with Peter Milligan, Vortex, 1987)
- News on Sunday: "Summer of Love" (seven episodes, with Peter Milligan, 1987)
- Crisis (anthology, Fleetway):
  - New Statesmen: "Riding the Tiger" (with John Smith and Jim Baikie, in #11, 1989)
  - Artoons (one-page illustrations, with Tony Riot, in #15–24, 1989)
- A1 #1: "The Hollow Circus" (script and art, anthology, Atomeka, 1989)
- Deadline #20: "Flaming Carrot" (with Bob Burden, anthology, Deadline, 1990)
- Revolver #1–6: "Rogan Gosh: Star of the East" (with Peter Milligan, anthology, Fleetway, 1990)
- Shade, the Changing Man vol. 2 #22: "A Pale Afternoon" (with Peter Milligan, DC Comics, 1992)
- Skin (with Peter Milligan and Carol Swain, graphic novel, Tundra Publishing, 1992)
- Rock Power: "The Ballad of Toad McFarlane ('cept It's Not a Ballad)" (with John Wagner and Alan Grant, IPC Media, 1992)
- Solo #12 (script and art, with Steven Cook, Howard Hallis, Jono Howard, Tom O'Connor and Robbie Morrison, DC Comics, 2006)
- Captain America: Who Won't Wield the Shield?: "Doctor America" (with Matt Fraction and Howard Hallis, anthology one-shot, Marvel, 2010)
- Spider-Man|Spider-Man: Fever #1–3 (script and art, Marvel Knights, 2010)
- House of Mystery vol. 2 #27: "Long Strange Trip" (with Matthew Sturges, co-feature, Vertigo, 2010)
- Age of Heroes #4: "Captain America: Man of God" (with Elliott Kalan, anthology, Marvel, 2010)
- Judge Dredd Megazine (anthology, Fleetway/Rebellion):
  - Judge Dredd: "The Walking Dredd" (with Rob Williams, in #311, 2011)
  - Chopper: "Wandering Spirit" (with David Baillie, in #395–399, 2018)
- Scalped #50: "The Art of Surviving" (with Jason Aaron, among other artists, Vertigo, 2011)
- Rocketeer Adventures #4: "Flight of the Aeronaut" (with John Arcudi, anthology, IDW Publishing, 2011)
- Judge Dredd #2: "The Good Parts" (with Duane Swierczynski, co-feature, IDW Publishing, 2012)
- Justice League vol. 2 #23.3 (with China Miéville, among other artists, DC Comics, 2013)
- Dark Horse Presents (anthology, Dark Horse):
  - "The Deleted" (script and art, with Darrin Grimwood, in vol. 2 #32–35, 2014)
  - "Dream Gang" (script and art, in vol. 3 #1–4, 7–10 and 14–17, 2014–2015)
- Doctor Fate vol. 4 #17–18 (with Paul Levitz, DC Comics, 2016–2017)
- The Spirit Centenary Newspaper (script and art, anthology, LICAF, 2017)

=== Covers only ===
- 2000 AD #33, 39, 41, 405, 517, 524, 536, 553, 588, 607–608, 622, Annual '89 and '91, 761, Action Special '92, 1571, 1960, 1975, 2087 (IPC Media/Fleetway/Rebellion, 1977–2018)
- Judge Dredd's Crime Files #3 (Eagle, 1985)
- Judge Dredd Mega-Special '89, Yearbook '93 (Fleetway, 1989–1993)
- The Best of 2000 AD #41, 46, 49, 77–78, 101–102 (Fleetway, 1989–1994)
- Mister X vol. 2 #1 (Vortex, 1989)
- The Saga of the Man Elf #1 (Trident, 1989)
- Shade, the Changing Man vol. 2 #1–13, 24–29, 31–32 (DC Comics, 1990–1993)
- Judge Dredd: Muzak Killer tpb (Titan, 2002)
- Dan Dare #3 (Virgin, 2008)
- Judge Dredd Megazine #272, 329 (Rebellion, 2008–2012)
- Peter Parker #4 (Marvel, 2010)
- Jonah Hex vol. 2 #56 (DC Comics, 2010)
- Xombi vol. 2 #1 (DC Comics, 2011)
- Catalyst Comix #3, 6, 9 (Dark Horse, 2013–2014)
- Judge Dredd #13–16 (IDW Publishing, 2013–2014)
- Doctor Fate vol. 4 #16 (DC Comics, 2016)
- The Electric Sublime #4 (IDW Publishing, 2017)
- Cave Carson Has a Cybernetic Eye #6 (DC's Young Animal, 2017)
- Black Hammer: The Quantum Age #4 (Dark Horse, 2018)
- Kick-Ass vol. 2 #13 (Image, 2019)
- Prodigy #5 (Image, 2019)

== Awards ==
- 1992: nominated for Eisner Award for "Best Cover Artist", for Shade, the Changing Man
- 1993: nominated for Eisner Award for "Best Cover Artist", for Shade, the Changing Man and "Best Graphic Album: New" for Skin
