= Floyd Hughes =

English designer, artist and illustrator

- Born: London, England
- Occupation(s): Production designer, Storyboard artist, Comic book illustrator

Floyd Hughes is an English production designer, storyboard artist and comic book illustrator. Based in Brooklyn, New York, he is also an art professor at the Pratt Institute.

== Early life ==
Hughes was born in the East End of London, to Guyanese parents. He spent his early years working in London's Dark They Were, and Golden-Eyed fantasy book and comic shop, situated deep in London's SoHo district, in the late 1970s. Then he had a stint in Forbidden Planets' first store in London's Denmark Street in the early 1980s.

== Later career ==
Hughes began his professional career in 1980 working as an artist/writer in English comics and magazines. Hughes' first professional work was published in a 2000 AD Summer Special and his fanzine work had been in David Hornsby's Apocolypse fanzine published in the UK. In the early 80’s he produced concert stage artwork for The Clash and worked in the film and television industry as a storyboard artist, production illustrator and special make-up effects technician on films that include Clive Barker's Hellraiser and Hellbound: Hellraiser II, and Highlander.

In 1988 he moved to New York City and continued his freelance career working in comics, illustration, film, music videos and as a designer for MTV Animation's Downtown and Celebrity Deathmatch. Hughes illustrated the Marvel Comics mini-series Hellhound and served as art director on Russell Simmons Presents B.A.D Magazine, a project funded by Time Warner under its Mad brand. Hughes also produced on screen artwork for the movie Antitrust and pre- production illustrations for the Will Smith film I Am Legend. Hughes also did two CD sleeve paintings for the AC/DC album Ballbreaker.

In 1990 Hughes collaborated with music journalist Charles Shaar Murray on Purple Days, a comic strip inspired by the life and times of Jimi Hendrix. Purple Days appeared in Revolver, a 48-page magazine-sized comic book published in the UK.

In mid-2008, Hughes worked with director Spike Lee on a Burger King commercial starring P. Diddy. His graphic novel adaptation of fine artist Danny Simmons’ 2003 novel Three Days As the Crow Flies was published February 2008 by Simon & Schuster.

Hughes is an Adjunct Associate Professor at the Pratt Institute School Of Art and Design in Brooklyn, New York, and was the recipient of the prestigious "Most Distinguished Teacher Award 2008/2009". He became the Facility Advisor of the Static Fish Comic Club in 1999, and still is today.

Hughes created storyboards for Spike Lee films, including Red Hook Summer (2012) and BlacKkKlansman(2018)

== Books illustrated ==
- 85, a novel. Written by Danny Simmons, illustrated by Hughes. Simon & Schuster, 2008. (ISBN 978-0-7432-9781-3)
