= The Mystery Play =

1994 graphic novella

- Cover of The Mystery Play paperback, art by Jon J Muth.
- Date: January 1994
- Page count: 76 pages
- Publisher: Vertigo

Creative team
- Writers: Grant Morrison
- Artists: Jon J Muth
- Letterers: Todd Klein
- Colourists: Jon J. Muth
- Editors: Art Young
- ISBN: 1-56389-108-5

The Mystery Play is the title of a graphic novel written by Grant Morrison and illustrated by Jon J Muth, released as a hardcover by American company DC Comics's Vertigo imprint in 1994.

== Synopsis ==
Townley, a fictional Yorkshire town, is trying to revive its lost fortunes by hosting a series of mystery plays – allegorical medieval plays recreating stories from the New Testament – but the plan hits a snag when the actor who plays God is found dead. Detective Sergeant Frank Carpenter is brought into the sleepy town to solve the murder, while local reporter Annie Woolf performs an investigation of her own. As the suspects mount up, Carpenter finds his grip on reality slipping, until things come to a shocking climax during a recreation of the crucifixion of Jesus.

== Plot summary ==
In a bid to raise the town's profile and attract investment, the mayor of the struggling Yorkshire town of Townley has commissioned a performance of a series of Medieval mystery plays that will re-enact scenes from the Bible, but a frustrated local reporter Annie Woolf believes to be a ploy to improve his tattered reputation ahead of local elections. On the opening night of the Old Testament cycle, during a play about the fall of Adam and Eve, Doctor Bell - the man who was to play God - is found dead backstage. Detective Sergeant Frank Carpenter arrives from Manchester CID to investigate. While leaving the autopsy room he has a mysterious encounter with a man who is slicing up raincoats, who says he must "protect the children".

Woolf finds Carpenter in his hotel's bar, where he is filling in a crossword puzzle. She tries to press him for information, but he evades her questions. When he leaves, she sees that he has filled in the crossword with gibberish. Carpenter retires to his room, but is awoken late at night by the local police, who say the doctor's body has gone missing from the morgue. The only possible clue is a hacked-up raincoat like the one he had seen the mysterious man with earlier.

The following day Carpenter meets Mayor Purves and the local vicar, Reverend Tilley, but is unable to dissuade them from seeking out a replacement actor to play God. He then interviews their chief suspect, a man named Severs who portrayed Satan in the mystery play. The interview goes badly wrong when Severs seemingly transforms into the Devil and begins to taunt Carpenter about something from his past. Carpenter has a vision of a barrister whitewashing bloodied children's wallpaper before staggering out of the building and vomiting. A police officer informs him that they've found Doctor Bell's body in a local pig pen, where it is being devoured.

At the offices of The Townley Guardian, Woolf's editor suggests that the murder may be linked to an escaped mental patient from a nearby hospital. Meanwhile, Carpenter corners Mayor Purves on his way to a supposed council meeting, and grills him over the death of Doctor Bell, who had accused Purves of having sex with an underage prostitute. Purves denies the claim but Carpenter follows him to a brothel, where he glimpses the mayor having sex with a mannequin. Elsewhere, a rambler finds the body of a naked man in a crashed car in some woods.

The next day, Carpenter interviews Reverend Tilley, who admits that he hasn't believed in God since his wife died, but that he pretends to have faith to comfort his parishioners. Soon after, Woolf confronts Carpenter with the truth: he is actually the escaped mental patient, not a police officer. "Carpenter" admits this is true and says he can't exactly remember what it was that he did that got him locked up, but after escaping he found the body of Detective Sergeant Carpenter in his crashed car, and saw a chance for redemption. If he could solve the mystery of the killing, he decided, he could solve the mystery of himself - what he did, and who he was before some unknown terrible thing in his past happened. He makes Woolf promise not to look into his past until the case is closed, but on advice from her editor, she decides to investigate anyway, and discovers that "Carpenter" was actually the "Raincoat Man" who was charged with brutally raping and murdering a little girl, Sarah Downing, in Townley some time ago.

The following evening, the town is preparing for the inauguration of the New Testament cycle, which will end with a recreation of the crucifixion of Jesus. The Raincoat Man tells Woolf that he has almost figured out who the killer is - he just needs to "rise up" above it to understand the case fully. Woolf calls the police and tells them what has happened. As the crowds gather in front of the crucifix, squads of police converge on Townley and Woolf breaks down, confronting first the Raincoat Man and then the crowd with the truth of his crime. The crowd becomes a furious mob that crucifies him on a hill overlooking the town, but they have only put the nails through his overcoat, and as police helicopters approach with beams on, he is able to slip down and escape in the confusion, leaving his coat flapping in the wind.

Ten years later, Townley is transformed; a Japanese company has come to the town and opened a factory, bringing prosperity to the area. Woolf, who has written articles and a book on the murder, is getting dinner with a writer named Alan, who is turning the whole thing into a play for television. As Woolf leaves, however, the waiter brings her the grey overcoat "Carpenter" was wearing during his investigation. She protests that it isn't her coat, but the waiter says it is, and even has her name inside. She allows him to put it on her as she says, "Yes. I suppose it is".

== Publication ==
The Mystery Play was initially by Vertigo in the US and Warner Books in the UK in 1994, and republished with another work of Morrison's, Sebastian O, in 2017:

- The Mystery Play (graphic novel, 76 pages, Vertigo, hardcover, 1994, ISBN 1-56389-108-5; softcover, Warner Books, 1995, ISBN 1-56389-189-1)
- Sebastian O/The Mystery Play (graphic novel, 168 pages, Vertigo, hardcover, October 2017, ISBN 1-40127-419-6)

The Mystery Play was awarded the Eisner Award in 1995 for Best Painter/Multimedia Artist (Interior Art).
