= Patrick Neighly =

American journalist

Patrick Neighly is a former journalist currently working in the Hollywood visual effects industry. He is better known in some quarters for writing several comic books and graphic novels, including Subatomic, which predicted both domestic spying by the NSA and an Edward Snowden-esque response to it in the aftermath of 9/11. His comic book work has been published in the US and France.

== Bibliography ==
- Subatomic (with Jorge Heufemann, Mad Yak Press, 2004 ISBN 0-9717995-1-2)
- Anarchy for the Masses (with Kereth Cowe-Spigai, Disinformation, 2004 ISBN 0-9713942-2-9)
- First Lady (with Stephen R. Buell, Mad Yak Press, 2005)
- Texarkana (with Donny Hadiwidjaja, Mad Yak Press, 2005 ISBN 0-9717995-3-9)
- The Supernaturalists (with Jorge Heufeman, Mad Yak Press, 2005 ISBN 0-9717995-4-7)
- Black-Eyed Susan issues 1-3 (with Donny Hadiwidjaja, Mad Yak Press, 2007 ISBN 0-9717995-7-1)
