= Sebastian O =

Comic book series

- Steve Yeowell's cover to Sebastian O #1

Publication information
- Publisher: Vertigo
- Schedule: Monthly
- Format: Limited series
- Genre: Steampunk
- Publication date: May – July 1993
- No. of issues: 3

Creative team
- Created by: Grant Morrison; Steve Yeowell
- Written by: Grant Morrison
- Artist: Steve Yeowell

Collected editions
- Sebastian O: ISBN 1-4012-0337-X

Sebastian O is a comic book series written by Grant Morrison, drawn by Steve Yeowell and published by the Vertigo imprint of DC Comics in 1993.

== Publication history ==
Sebastian O was originally commissioned by editor Art Young for Disney's proposed Touchmark imprint, along with Peter Milligan and Duncan Fegredo's Enigma and J. M. DeMatteis & Paul Johnson's Mercy. After Disney cancelled the proposed line, Young took the project with him to DC Comics, where Karen Berger's Vertigo imprint was readying for launch.

Steve Yeowell took inspiration from Victorian artist and dandy Aubrey Beardsley's work when completing the art for the series.

== Synopsis ==
An example of steampunk, Sebastian O tells the story of a young flamboyant assassin in an alternate and technologically advanced Victorian era London and his attempts to track down Lord Theo Lavender who condemned him to prison for his moral crimes and transgressive literature.

The world-traveling Sebastian belongs to the Club de Paradis Artificiel, which included the lesbian George, the pederast Abbe, and his betrayer Lavender. Despite being the central character, Sebastian is a narcissistic sociopath, at various points of the plot killing a police officer and having his remains fed to his cat, cutting off a prison warders hand to allow him to escape a palm-print cell, and cutting a man's throat whilst claiming "He's only stunned".

== Collected editions ==
The series has been collected into a trade paperback:

- Sebastian O (with Grant Morrison and Steve Yeowell, Vertigo, 3-issue mini-series, 1993, tpb, 2004, 80 pages, Titan, ISBN 1-84023-996-4, Vertigo, ISBN 1-4012-0337-X)

== See also ==
- List of steampunk works
