= Revolver (British comics) =

British comic

- The cover of Revolver #2 (dated August 1990) featuring Rogan Gosh, art by Brendan McCarthy.

Publication information
- Publisher: Fleetway Publications
- Schedule: Monthly
- Format: Ongoing series
- Publication date: July 1990 – January 1991
- No. of issues: 7

Creative team
- Created by: Steve MacManus
- Editor: Peter Hogan

Revolver was a British monthly comic anthology published by Fleetway Publications from July 1990 to January 1991. The comic was designed as a monthly companion title to Crisis and was intended to appeal to older readers than other Fleetway titles in order to take advantage of a boom in interest in 'adult' comics. Revolver was not a commercial success, and lasted just seven issues before being cancelled and merged with Crisis.

== Creation ==
After a strong start and an alarming dip sales of Fleetway Publications' mature reader anthology Crisis had levelled out at a reasonable level. The title's editor Steve MacManus was also made group editor for the newly defined '2000 AD' group, consisting of the fortnightly Crisis and the long-running science fiction weekly 2000 AD, as well as any spin-offs. Revolver had initially been conceived as a high-quality export title to run alongside Crisis some two years earlier, but internal upheaval had seen the book delayed repeatedly. However, Fleetway scored a major hit by licensing a Teenage Mutant Ninja Turtles weekly just as the franchise hit critical mass, and MacManus was finally given the greenlight to make monthly companion titles for Crisis and 2000 AD (the latter becoming Judge Dredd Megazine) by managing director John Davidge. MacManus picked Peter Hogan, who had primarily been involved in the music industry working for the likes of Rough Trade and IRS Records as well as music magazines, feeling he would have "his finger on the pulse". For his assistant Hogan recruited Frank Wynne, an Irishman with a vast knowledge of European comics and was known to Michael Bennent, who was in turn being groomed to take over as editor of Crisis. An unsuccessful applicant for the assistant editor of Revolver was David Bishop, who nevertheless impressed MacManus and would later become editor of Judge Dredd Megazine 1991-1992, and 2000 AD itself from 1995-2000. With his design work for Crisis having received a positive response, Rian Hughes was assigned to style Revolver. The name was chosen to emphasise the diverse content of the comic and in reference to the name of the acclaimed Beatles album.

The format was settled on as 52 pages, in full colour. Unlike the political bent of Crisis, MacManus decided Revolver would have a more eclectic mix of genres more in line with the IPC Magazines anthologies he had begun working on, but aimed at an older readership. He began assembling stories for the comic, with the same improved creator benefits as used for Crisis. A Jimi Hendrix biography by music journalist Charles Shaar Murray (based on his book Crosstown Traffic) had been in the offing since the beginning, and was greenlit with Floyd Hughes (who had contributed some work to Crisis) as artist, aided by the so-called Second Summer of Love giving a major spike in interest in psychedelia. Grant Morrison, well known to MacManus from his work on 2000 AD and on good terms with MacManus after he stepped in to publish the controversial "The New Adventures of Hitler" after its original publication Cut folded, approached Fleetway with a plan for a revisionist take on Dan Dare; with the 40th anniversary of the character's debut in Eagle approaching, Morrison began working on the story with Hughes as artist. Hogan commissioned another psychedelic-influenced strip in the form of "Rogan Gosh" from Peter Milligan and Brendan McCarthy and "Happenstance and Kismet" from Marvel UK veterans Paul Neary and Steve Parkhouse, as well as recruiting Shaky Kane and Julie Hollings from Deadline to create "Pinhead Nation" and "Dire Streets" respectively. The final strip in each issue would be a rotating one-off, a format used by MacManus with some success in the pages of Crisis.

Promoting the comic was difficult for publicist Igor Goldkind due to Revolver's diffuse subjects, and at MacManus' suggestion he eventually went with the slogan "Where Dan Dare meets Jimi Hendrix", making the same connection between comics and music as the well-received Deadline and to take advantage of a boom in sixties nostalgia.

== Publishing history ==
At £1.65 per issue, Revolver was at the time the most expensive regular British comic ever put on sale. A buoyant MacManus announced "I don't think that there's any doubt in anybody's mind that it's going to be a success; the only question is how big it is going to be". As with the launch of Crisis, the creative staff were sent on a nationwide signing tour.

However, despite high hopes Revolver was cancelled after just seven issues. The cancellation took most of the title's staff by surprise, though the final issue was able to include a farewell message, avoid starting any new stories and advertising that "Dare" and "Happenstance and Kismet" would be continuing in Crisis. A planned update of "Tyranny Rex" by John Smith and John Hicklenton and "Forever England" by Morrison and Paul Grist were both switched over to Crisis, but failed to crystallise before Crisis itself was cancelled in October 1991, while other commissioned material was placed in a pair of specials. MacManus was later told Revolver had lost Fleetway £750,000 over its brief run. The cancellation was swift enough that there was little chance to investigate why Revolver was selling poorly; MacManus would later speculate that it was being displayed with children's comics in some newsagents while in others the comic being marked for 'mature readers' saw it placed with pornographic magazines.

== Stories ==
=== Dare ===
Published: July 1990 to January 1991
Writer: Grant Morrison
Artist: Rian Hughes

Dan Dare is retired, and a puppet of regime intent on exploiting both humans and Treens alike.

- Continued in Crisis.

=== Dire Streets ===
Published: July 1990 to September 1990, November 1990 to January 1991
Writer/artist: Julie Hollings

Disaster-prone Kaz negotiates the pitfalls of house sharing and university life.

=== Happenstance and Kismet ===
Published: July 1990 to January 1991
Writer: Paul Neary
Artist: Steve Parkhouse

The misadventures of jazz musician Monty Happenstance and translator Lucius Kismet.

- Continued in Crisis.

=== Pinhead Nation ===
Published: July 1990 to January 1991
Writer/artist: Shaky Kane

The rantings of a large man with a tiny head.

=== Purple Days ===
Published: July 1990 to January 1991
Writer: Charles Shaar Murray
Artist: Floyd Hughes

A journey into the life and mind of Jimi Hendrix.

- 'Book One' concluded in the final issue of Revolver.

=== Rogan Gosh ===
Published: July to December 1990
Writer: Peter Milligan
Artist: Brendan McCarthy

Rogan Gosh is a loutish Indian time traveller and Karmanaut, out to stop Kali's attempts to destroy time and cause chaos all of his own.

- Later collected by Vertigo Comics.

=== One-off stories ===
- Nine Inches to the Mile

Published: #1 (July 1990)
Writer: Igor Goldkind
Artist: Phil Winslade

- God's Little Acre

Published: #2 (August 1990)
Writer: Ian Edginton
Artist: D'Israeli

- Plug into Jesus

Published: #4 (October 1990)
Writer: Gary Pleece
Artist: Warren Pleece

- The Crossing

Published: #4 (October 1990)
Writer/artist: Al Davison

- Circular Motion

Published: #5 (November 1990)
Writer/artist: Simon Harrison

- Martello Nation

Published: #6 (December 1990)
Writer/artist: Keith Page

- The Secret Garden

Published: #7 (January 1991)
Writer: Terry Hooper
Artist: Aiden Potts

- 51 Stars

Published: #7 (January 1991)
Writer/artist: Ed Hillyer

- Zen and the Art of Shopping

Published: #7 (January 1991)
Writer: Tony Allen
Artist: Shanti

- Did I? Did I? Did I in My Own Self Shine?

Published: #7 (January 1991)
Writer/artist: Brendan McCarthy

- All Around the World

Published: #7 (January 1991)
Writer: Si Spencer
Artist: Sean Phillips

== Spin-offs ==
- Revolver - The Horror Special (1 edition, 1990)
- Crisis Presents the Revolver Romance Special (1 edition, 1991)

== Collected editions ==
Title	ISBN	Publisher	Release date	Contents
Dare	9781853862113	Xpresso Books	1991	Material from Revolver #1-7 and Crisis #56
Rogan Gosh: Star of the East	9781853862533	Vertigo Comics	1994	Material from Revolver #1-6
Yesterday's Tomorrows: Rian Hughes' Collected Comics	9780861661541	Knockabout Comics	12 July 2007	Material from Revolver #1-7 and Crisis #56
Yesterday's Tomorrows: Rian Hughes' Collected Comics	9781607063148	Image Comics	1 February 2011	Material from Revolver #1-7 and Crisis #56

== Reception ==
Writing for Comics Bulletin in 2011, columnist Regie Rigby praised Revolver for its varied approach and laid-back demeanour, comparing it positively to Crisis. Designer Rian Hughes would later opine the title was "too scattergun - Hendrix and Dare in one magazine?", and felt the stories were not all of good quality, though he had positive memories of working with Hogan, MacManus and Davidge.

=== Accolades ===
Revolver was given the 1991 UK Comic Art Award for 'Best New Publication'.
