= The New Adventures of Hitler =

British comic book story

- Adolf Hitler on the cover of Crisis #48, dated 7 July 1990; art by Steve Yeowell.
- Publisher: Complete Print International; 1989; Fleetway Publications; 1990
- Publication date: July 1989 – July 1990
- Genre: Political
- Title(s): Cut; 1989; Crisis #46-49; 9 June to 21 July 1990

Creative team
- Writer: Grant Morrison
- Artist: Steve Yeowell
- Letterer: Gordon Robson
- Colourist(s): Nick Abadzis; Steve Whitaker
- Editor(s): Alan Jackson; Steve MacManus

"The New Adventures of Hitler" is a creator-owned British comic story. It was initially partially published in the magazine Cut in 1989, and then in its entirety in the adult-oriented comic Crisis. Written by Grant Morrison and drawn by Steve Yeowell, the story is based on Bridget Dowling's debated assertion that Adolf Hitler spent time in Liverpool shortly before the outbreak of World War I. "The New Adventures of Hitler" uses several anachronisms to comment on present-day politics at the time of publication, and caused some controversy in Britain.

== Creation ==
Grant Morrison and Steve Yeowell had broken through to critical acclaim with the revisionist superhero story "Zenith" in 2000 AD in 1987, and Morrison rapidly became one of the best-known British comic writers - including being headhunted by DC Comics. However, the writer continued to concurrently work on smaller-scale comics projects, as well as plays. With the boom in adult interest in comics following the mainstream success of Watchmen and The Dark Knight Returns, many different publications began showing interest in the medium - including Complete Print International, a Scottish publisher putting together a new music and culture magazine called Cut. Inspired by what they saw as the worrying parallels between 1930s Nazi Germany and the policies of the then-incumbent Conservative government under Margaret Thatcher, Morrison and Yeowell devised "The New Adventures of Hitler" for serialisation in the magazine.

What I had done is put Thatcherite ideology into the mouth of Hitler, because some of the things I see happening around me I find disturbing. The things that Thatcher is doing and saying, destroying the unions, Section 28 and the talked about camps for AIDS sufferers, are all things that Hitler talked about in Mein Kampf.

— Grant Morrison, quoted in "Newsdesk - Grant Morrison in Fascist Controversy", Speakeasy #100 (July 1989)

The premise that Adolf Hitler visited Liverpool is not given credence by most mainstream historians. Bridget Dowling's claims and unpublished autobiography My Brother-in-Law Adolf, detailing his stay with Dowling and her then-husband Alois Hitler, as an invention to make money following the end of World War II. Nevertheless, the idea had led to the 1978 satirical novel Young Adolf by Beryl Bainbridge and John Antrobus' 1980 play Hitler in Liverpool; Morrison was likewise uninterested in the historical veracity of the story, and used the idea to create a satirical story. As such, "The New Adventures of Hitler" featured numerous anachronistic devices - including appearances by John Lennon singing "Working Class Hero", Morrissey (then of The Smiths) singing "Heaven Knows I'm Miserable Now" and a spectral vision of Thatcher herself. Morrison used socialist and Jewish friends as a sounding board for the script and to identify any potential issues. The story was set to be serialised in four-page black-and-white chapters in each issue of Cut for the magazine's first year.

== Publishing history ==
The strip was instantly controversial. One of Cut's columnists was singer Pat Kane, then part of the group Hue and Cry, who were enjoying chart success at the time. Upon learning of the strip, he threatened to resign on the grounds that the strip was using Nazi iconography for shock value. Publisher Bill Sinclair attempted to quell Kane's concerns by showing him the initial chapter but the singer remained unmoved, feeling the downtrodden portrayal of Hitler risked attracting reader sympathy and trivialised his crimes. Contacted by comics magazine Speakeasy for comment, Morrison defended the work, attacked middle class liberals for "running away" from Hitler and personally excoriating Kane as an example of the latter - feeling "the things he has done have been indescribable".

The involvement of Kane saw the spat picked up on by the British tabloid press, with Morrison receiving phone calls from Sun reporters masquerading as staff of the Wakefield Inquirer and accused of being a Nazi. The argument became ugly, with the magazine's editor Alan Jackson siding with Kane while Cut publisher Bill Sinclair backed Morrison, describing the comic as "a brilliant piece of work" and questioning those who felt it should be suppressed. The first chapter of the story was published in the first issue of Cut (dated July 1989) but the row refused to die down, culminating in Kane using his column in the third issue to directly attack the subject's unsuitability for the medium before quitting the magazine along with Jackson. The following issue Morrison was given the vacated page for an open letter to Kane, attacking his "fashionable socialist credentials" and signing off with the invitation to "Fuck off and die." However, it was to be the final issue of Cut, which folded afterwards.

The travails of the strip had attracted sympathy from elsewhere in the industry, and Yeowell recalled the pair received several offers from publishers to continue publication. A first run agreed with Fleetway Publications' fortnightly adult-orientated anthology Crisis in 1990. Ironically, during the initial controversy Morrison had stated the ambition for the story was "to write a political strip that didn't turn into a dour tract, without hitting them over the head with it, like Crisis does". For the run in Crisis, the story was split into four 12-page chapters, appearing in #46 to #49 from 9 June to 21 July 1990. The strip was coloured by Nick Abadzis and Steve Whitaker, who used a series of pseudonyms - The Spock Whitney Quintet; Brian, Dougall and Mr. Rusty; and Your Mum - for the first trio of issues before being credited under their real names on the last part. The publication in Crisis largely passed without comment.

While Fleetway were interested in publishing a collected edition, Crisis editor Steve MacManus revealed the company had only paid for the first run British rights, and other publishers were also bidding for further rights. Morrison and Yeowell later considered setting up their own label to release some of their creator-owned work, while Yeowell noted several small publishers had approached him intermittently. However, as of 2025 no collected edition has been produced.

== Plot summary ==
In 1912, Adolf Hitler is staying with his brother Alois and sister-in-law Bridget, in their terraced house at 102 Upper Stanhope Street, Liverpool. Adolf - whose career as a painter met with critical scorn - is troubled by strange visions and unemployed, but remains convinced he will make his mark on the world and becomes obsessed with horoscopes and discovering the Holy Grail. Alois, an evangelical seller of safety razors, is given to giving demagogic speeches on his plans to take over Europe with 'Hitler International' and an army of salesmen marching out of Germany, criticising Adolf for his own lack of plans as he and his wife tire of the drifter. Adolf's visions intensify, and he undertakes a long discussion with John Bull. The latter feels the country has gone downhill since the death of Queen Victoria and needs "a mad vicious bitch in the driving seat." (Note: The same frame features a photograph of Margaret Thatcher in the background)

The following day Bull again appears to Adolf, convincing him humans need tyranny and that he should follow the example of the British Empire in this regard, causing Hitler to abandon any thoughts of resurrecting his art career. He has a heated argument with Alois, outlining his plans to seize control of a country by attacking Marxist trade unions, indulging the enterprising middle class, outlawing freedom of the press, criminalising amoral 'tendencies' and putting absolute power in the ruling body. Alois scoffs at Adolf's plans, believing "no-one in his right mind would ever fall for that". A reading with local astrologer Mrs. Prentice convinces Adolf his message isn't being taken seriously because of his walrus moustache, so he shaves it into a toothbrush shape. After Christmas 1912, Alois announces he and Bridget will be leaving Liverpool in an attempt to get rid of Adolf. Bull leads Adolf to a fishmonger's, convincing him the Holy Grail is the establishment's fetid, overflowing toilet. While the proprietor ejects him, Adolf is convinced he has touched the Grail and is destined for greatness. On Saint George's Day 1913 he leaves Liverpool, Alois having arranged accommodation for him in Munich as Adolf attempts to avoid military service in Austria. Adolf's resolve to make his mark on the world has been restored, and he vows to return to England in triumph.

== Reception ==
In a 2020 overview of "The New Adventures of Hitler" for Medium, Reed Beebe felt that Morrison's pop-culture sensibilities lifted the story above others with the same theme.
