= Alternative versions of Superman =

Various incarnations of comic book superhero

Alternate versions of Superman
- Variations of Superman throughout DC Comics' publications' parallel universes and alternate timelines. Interior artwork from Superman vol. 1, #708 (April 2011 DC Comics); Art by Eddy Barrows
- Publisher: DC Comics
- First appearance: Action Comics #1 (April 1938)
- Created by: Joe Shuster; Jerry Siegel
- Characters: Superman (Kal-L); Superman (Earth-22); Superboy-Prime; Ultraman; Hank Henshaw; Eradicator; Superman (Kal Kent); Bizarro; Negative Superman; Superman – Calvin Ellis (Kalel); Superman (Val Zod)
- See also: Superman in other media

The character of Superman was created by Jerry Siegel and Joe Shuster, and has been continually published in a variety of DC Comics book titles since its premiere in 1938. There have been several versions of Superman over the years, both as the main hero in the stories as well as several alternative versions.

== In mainstream comic continuity ==
Originally, there was only one Superman. However, beginning in the late 1940s, demand for comics shifted from superheroes as war, horror, science fiction and romance comics became more popular. Most of the DC Comics superhero titles were cancelled or began featuring the more popular genres. Superman, along with Batman and Wonder Woman, continued to be published. To explain how Superman could have been active as a young man in the 1930s when later stories show Superman still youthful in the 1960s, DC Comics developed a multiverse, the existence of several realities. The original Golden Age Superman was retconned to Earth-Two, while the then-currently published hero was assigned to Earth-One.

In addition to these main two "official" variations of the standard Superman character, a number of characters have assumed the title of Superman in many variant stories set in both primary and alternative continuity. Following the storyline of The Death of Superman and during the subsequent Reign of the Supermen storyline, a number of characters claimed the mantle. In addition, Bizarro, for instance, is an imperfect duplicate of Superman. Other members of Superman's family of characters have borne the Super- prefix, including Supergirl, Krypto the Superdog and, in some instances, Superwoman.

=== Pre-Crisis 1938–1986 ===
Superman was first published in 1938. In 1986, DC Comics published Crisis on Infinite Earths, a 12-issue series designed to clean up and establish a new continuity for DC, affecting not only Superman, but all of the DC Comics characters. The versions of Superman from this time period are traditionally divided into three main periods.

==== Golden Age 1938–1950s ====
The first version of Superman began being published by DC Comics in 1938 appearing in Action Comics #1. To explain discrepancies in the aging of Superman across several decades, his earliest stories were retroactively portrayed as having taken place on an alternate world called Earth-Two. This version of Superman was initially depicted with reduced abilities, being able to jump very high, but not capable of true flight. The Golden Age Superman (Kal-L) is the first primary superhero of Earth-Two, who began his career as an adult and emerges just before World War II. He is a member of the Justice Society and, during World War II, the All-Star Squadron. As Clark Kent, he works for the Daily Star as a reporter and eventually becomes editor-in-chief. Clark eventually marries Lois Lane and settles down with her for several decades, and when Kal-L's long-lost cousin Power Girl arrives on Earth, they become her surrogate parents. Kal-L is erased from Earth's history after the events of Crisis on Infinite Earths, but survives and enters a "paradise" dimension. During the Infinite Crisis event, Kal-L and the Earth-Two Lois are killed. His main two foes are the Ultra-Humanite and the red-haired Lex Luthor. In addition, his "S" symbol on his chest is generally drawn in a less distinctive manner. Stories taking place in the 1970s and 1980s featuring this version of Superman are usually labelled as taking place on Earth-Two.

==== Silver Age 1950s–1971 ====
The more significant differences between the Golden Age version (later equated with Kal-L of Earth-Two) and Silver Age version (Kal-El of Earth-One) of Superman includes the Silver Age Kal-El beginning his public, costumed career as Superboy at the age of eight, more than a decade before nearly all other Earth-One heroes. Superboy only finds super-powered peers in the 30th-century Legion of Super-Heroes, though he also meets as a teenager Earth-One's only other major superpowered hero, "Aquaboy" (the teenaged Aquaman). Lex Luthor meets Superboy in Smallville when they are teens; the two are briefly friends before they become mortal enemies, years before they become adults. As an adult, Clark Kent works at the Daily Planet and Superman is a founding member of the Justice League of America.

The Silver Age Superman was typically characterized as being more grounded in reality than previous depictions, in that he was portrayed with a realistic appearance and embedded within logical and rationalistic narratives. While these were still based on the science fiction of his earlier iterations, Superman was portrayed in storylines that sought to uncover the mysteries of the world through observation and the use of evidence, including the concept of limits and the consequences of human action. This definition is attributed to Curt Swan, who was the principal artist of Superman comics from 1955 to 1985. Swan's extensive work on the character, which was responsible for much of the public perception of the superhero, emphasized anatomical realism, embedding in the character a sense of Norman Rockwellesque Americana. This depiction of the superhero resonated with the readers as indicated in the way some observers saw their own lived experiences in his stories.

==== Bronze Age 1971–1986 ====
In 1971, Dennis O'Neil and Julius Schwartz set out to simplify Superman's elaborate framework. They streamlined the Superman mythos by downsizing his abilities and reducing his power levels. This version only lasted a few issues. DC attempted more of a soft reboot in the 45th Anniversary issue of Action Comics. Lex Luthor and Brainiac were updated and modernized to make them more visibly dangerous for Superman. The Silver/Bronze Age (Earth-One) Superman was given a send-off in the Alan Moore-penned "imaginary story" Whatever Happened to the Man of Tomorrow? (1986). Colloquially known as "The Last Superman Story", it was a conclusive ending to Superman's story as a character. The story was originally conceived by senior editor Julius Schwartz, who designed a goodbye for the hero in his final two Superman issues (prior to the John Byrne The Man of Steel relaunch) – Superman #423 and Action Comics #583 (1986). Both comics were illustrated by longtime Superman artist Curt Swan.

==== Other Pre-Crisis versions ====
Before Crisis, the Multiverse was also used to explain an "evil" version of Superman from Earth-Three as well as other versions that officially existed. Earth-95 had Superman's father Jor-El rescue his entire family. Earth-149 saw Lex Luthor succeed in killing Superman. The Clark Kent of Earth-Prime, dubbed Superboy-Prime, Clark Kent originates from a world akin to the real world where the characters of the DC Universe are fictional.

In addition to official versions, other stories listed as "What Ifs" or imaginary stories which were not originally an official part of DC continuity. One example, Superman Red/Superman Blue was the subject of several story lines. The Silver Age version of the tale was an "imaginary story" in which Superman splits into two beings, one which marries Lois Lane, and the other marries Lana Lang. In Superman #300, a story imagines what would have happened if Superman had landed in the middle of the Cold War, with both the U.S. and the USSR trying to capture the capsule as it is landing. Kent is a reporter for a worldwide news service, and takes the name Skyboy.

=== Post-Crisis: 1986–present ===
The multiverse was discarded in the aftermath of the 1986 storyline Crisis on Infinite Earths, which destroyed the DC Comics multiverse and merged the remaining universes into one universe (later described as New Earth). A more modern adaptation of the mainstream "Earth-One" Superman debuted in John Byrne's The Man of Steel miniseries in 1986. Superman's backstory was heavily revised and many Silver Age elements, such as his career as Superboy, were removed. Many of Superman's supporting cast, including Supergirl and Krypto, were written out of continuity to return Superman to his status as Krypton's sole survivor until Supergirl was reintroduced in the 2004 Superman/Batman story arc "The Supergirl from Krypton". In addition, Krypton is reimagined as an emotionless and sterile society where children are grown in a birthing matrix, as Kryptonians find sexual reproduction to be barbaric. Other differences include Lex Luthor as a business mogul with secret criminal dealings rather than a genius scientist; Superman's adoptive parents Jonathan and Martha Kent being alive and well in the present; only green kryptonite existing (until the mid-2000s), and Superman thinking of himself as Clark Kent first, with "Superman" being a persona he adopts to preserve his privacy. Nuances in the characters mythos were later defined in various Superman origin stories, such as Superman: Birthright (2003).

The 2006 storyline Infinite Crisis served as a sequel to Crisis on Infinite Earths and saw Alexander Luthor Jr., son of Earth-Three's Lex Luthor, attempt to recreate the multiverse. Following Infinite Crisis, a new multiverse consisting of 52 alternative Earths was created, with most worlds featuring new alternative depictions of Superman. Infinite Crisis altered the continuity of the DC Universe, restoring many of the Silver Age elements of Superman's biography (such as his meeting Lex Luthor at a younger age and his teenage membership as Superboy in the Legion of Super-Heroes) that were removed in The Man of Steel.

Another incarnation of Superman was introduced in September 2011 in the wake of DC's Flashpoint event and The New 52 publishing relaunch, which rebooted the continuity of the DC Universe. The New 52 Superman's backstory is detailed in the first story arc of the second volume of Action Comics (2011–2012). This latest incarnation of Superman incorporates elements of nearly every previous version, and starts off as a reporter for the Daily Star (later the Daily Planet). He and Lois are friends but not lovers, his parents are dead, and it is not until adulthood that he emerges as Superman. Later, after joining the Justice League, he starts a relationship with Wonder Woman. At the conclusion of the "Superman Reborn" storyline, the histories of the pre-Flashpoint and New 52 Superman and Lois Lane are merged, effectively writing over the New 52 era.

== Alternative universe depictions ==
=== Earth-1 ===
In the Silver Age of Comic Books, Earth-1 was home to the mainstream version of Superman known by most readers of DC Comics. Following DC's Flashpoint event, The New 52 Earth-1 is the setting of the Earth One graphic novel series, where Superman is one of a handful of heroes just starting out in modernized retellings of classic origin stories.

=== Superman (Earth 2) ===
A completely separate Earth-2 Superman, named Kal-El like the mainstream Superman, was introduced in the new Earth 2 series launched in May 2012 as part of The New 52. The new Earth-2 Superman's aged foster parents John and Martha Kent both survive to the present, unlike that of the mainstream Superman.

Superman is seemingly killed alongside his world's Batman and Wonder Woman while fighting off an invasion from the planet Apokolips led by Steppenwolf. It is later revealed that Superman survived and allied with Apokolips under the name Brutaal. After being snapped out of Darkseid's control by Lois Lane, Superman and Red Tornado leave for the Kent family's farm. After a protracted battle with Earth 2's superheroes, Superman is revealed to be a Bizarro-type clone. Realizing that his power is waning, Superman is destroyed by Lois.

The real Superman is kept alive in DeSaad's lab to be harvested for genetic material. As a result, Superman is left powerless by the time he is rescued by the Wonders of the World. Superman later sacrifices himself to stop the Parademon factories on Earth 2.

Writer James Robinson commented on this version of Superman: "Mourning the death of his beloved, Superman carries both a sadness in his heart along with the weight of Earth 2's welfare upon on his shoulders, while never showing this and seeming to all that he is this world's peerless champion."

=== Val-Zod (Earth 2) ===
Following Flashpoint (2011), a different take on Earth 2 is created when "The New 52" rebooted the DC universe. After Kal-El is killed in an invasion of Earth by Darkseid, a new Kryptonian who resembles a blue eyed black man emerges as Superman, Val-Zod, a pacifist who reconsiders his beliefs to defeat an evil clone of Kal-El. Val-Zod is the son of the deceased Zod who, along with Power Girl, are both adopted by Jor-El and Lara.

=== Ultraman (Earth-3) ===
Ultraman was originally Superman's evil analogue from Earth-Three. After the multiverse concept was retired, Ultraman was introduced as an alien from Qward with powers similar to the original. DC later attempted the "evil universe" trope again with the Antimatter Universe in JLA: Earth 2 (2000), introducing an Ultraman who is Lt. Clark Kent, a human astronaut who is experimented on during a deep space mission. He is a member of the Crime Syndicate of Amerika. Following DC's series 52, the maxiseries Countdown introduced a new "Golden Age" Ultraman from the new Earth-3, a member of the Crime Society of America. This Ultraman and his team are analogues for the elder Superman and the Justice Society Infinity of the new Earth-2. Following The New 52 reboot, DC revised Earth-3 again with Forever Evil (2013–14), making Ultraman of Earth-3 Superman from Earth-0's evil counterpart and a Kryptonian once again.

=== Captain Allen Adam (Earth-4) ===
The Superman of post-Crisis Earth-4 is Captain Allen Adam, the Quantum Superman, who incorporated elements of Captain Atom and Doctor Manhattan, Air Force Captain Allen Adam gained his quantum abilities when he was disintegrated in a blast caused by an experimental U-235 engine. The U-235 particles fused with his body, and his disembodied consciousness built an enhanced copy of his former body, but he keeps his "quantum senses" at a managable level using drugs. He is one of the Supermen from throughout the multiverse who are recruited by the Monitor Zillo Valla in Final Crisis: Superman Beyond, and allows the drugs in his system to wear off in order to reach a grander state of being. This version of Captain Atom is revisited in The Multiversity: Pax Americana (2015), which details his origin.

=== Captain Marvel (Earth-5) ===
On the post-Crisis Earth-5, Superman's closest analogue is Captain Marvel (originally a Fawcett Comics superhero) as shown in Superman: Beyond and Final Crisis.

=== Herr Superman and Hyperious (Earth-8) ===
Earth-8 is a pastiche of the Marvel Comics universe, home to villains Lord Havok and the Extremists, who are opposed by Avengers pastiche characters the Meta Militia (a modernization of the Champions of Angor). When visited during Countdown, a German Superman called "Herr Superman", who serves in Monarch's army, appears. In The New 52, Earth-8 is home to a Superman analogue named Hyperious who is a pastiche of Marvel's own Superman pastiche Hyperion. He is a member of an Avengers pastiche team named the Retaliators.

=== Harvey Dent (Earth-9) ===
The Superman from DC's Tangent Comics imprint (Earth-9) is a radically different character from the traditional Superman. Due to an experiment conducted on an entire town by a government black ops group called Nightwing, Harvey Dent was the lone infant survivor of a failed super-human program that killed hundreds. After growing to adulthood, and falling from the world's tallest building in an attempt to save a suicidal man, his dormant powers activate and he develops advanced physical and psychic abilities. Evolving millions of years past normal humans, he eventually becomes a "modern-day superhero". After attempting to give his wife the same powers as his, through what he thought was a safe version of the experiment, which resulted in her apparent death, Superman instead marries Power Girl and decides to protect Earth by conquering it.

=== Overman (Earth-10) ===
Earth-10, which is under the control of the Nazi Party, depicts an alternative Superman, usually known as Overman, who supports the Nazis' policy of genetic purity. He is a member of the JL-Axis, a Nazi-themed Justice League. However, Overman has growing doubts about his past use as enabler of the Nazi victory, especially after his discovery of an expanded Holocaust in North America. Although he attempts to halt the fall of the Eagles Ayrie due to the Freedom Fighters' sabotage, Overman is unable to prevent its impact in Metropolis and the death of millions. Distraught over Metropolis' destruction, added with his guilt over the millions of deaths that his regime was responsible for, Overman flees Earth, with the Nazis creating a cyborg replacement to take Overman's place.

=== Superwoman (Earth-11) ===
Superwoman is a gender-flipped version of Superman. The concept of Superwoman was introduced in Superman #349 ("The Turnabout Trap!"), where Mr. Mxyzptlk alters Earth to reverse the genders of several heroes and villains. Later stories, including Countdown and The Multiversity, introduced another version of Superwoman from Earth-11.

=== Superdemon (Earth-13) ===
On Earth-13, Superman's role is filled by Superdemon, a character who shares characteristics with Etrigan the Demon and Superman, and who leads the League of Shadows in a world of magic and cloak-and-dagger adventures.

=== Christopher Kent (Earth-16) ===
Christopher Kent of Earth-16 is introduced in Countdown: Arena (2008) as a "more evolved" Superman who was able to reformat his power source to any energy source he could consciously choose, effortlessly overcoming the Earth-30 and Earth-31 Supermen with energy powers in a head-to-head battle. He dies in an attempt to defeat Monarch using a massive amount of energy that burns out his body. The Earth-16 concept is refreshed following Flashpoint (2011). In The Multiversity (2015), Chris Kent, Superman's son, is the inheritor to his father's legacy in a world with no villains left to fight.

=== Overman (Earth-17) ===
The Superman of pre-Crisis Earth-17 is the original Overman, who was created by the government along with the other heroes of this Earth. Some time later, Overman embarks on a homicidal rampage due to an STD which had affected his mind and destroys Earth. Overman was killed during Crisis on Infinite Earths.

=== Saganowana (Earth-18) ===
Earth-18 is the setting of Justice Riders. In this reality, Superman's analogue is Saganowana, a bison-headed Native American hero.

=== The New Frontier (Earth-21) ===
In Darwyn Cooke's DC: The New Frontier, Superman is one of the heroes of Earth-21, who has been active since the 1940s, and still is during the events of the storyline, which occurs during the 1950s. As in Batman: The Dark Knight Returns, he is a government agent, but unlike DKR, he is willing to go against the U.S. government when he feels that the tensions between the humans and superhumans has to end. He is also a friend of Batman, rather than his foe as he is in The Dark Knight Returns.

=== Kingdom Come (Earth-22) ===
The Kingdom Come Superman. Art by Alex Ross

The Kingdom Come miniseries shows an alternative future in which Kal-El went into self-imposed exile following the death of Lois Lane. He returns after ten years at the behest of Wonder Woman. This version of Superman appears in DC's mainstream continuity in the Justice Society of America story "Thy Kingdom Come", where he joins the Society in battling Gog. The Kingdom Come Superman is more powerful and less vulnerable to kryptonite than his younger mainstream counterpart, due to greater exposure to yellow sun radiation. After returning to his home universe, Superman lives to see the formation of the Legion of Super-Heroes in the 31st century.

=== Calvin Ellis (Earth-23) ===
Final Crisis #7 introduces an African-American version of the Man of Steel who is the President of the United States in his secret identity, President Calvin Ellis (with the Kryptonian name of Kalel). Writer Grant Morrison confirmed that this Superman is a homage to President Barack Obama. On Earth-23, African American heroes have risen to positions of prominence (such as Nubia being Wonder Woman) inspired by Superman's legacy. He also leads Earth-23's Justice League and originates from Vathlo Island on Krypton. Ellis plays a large role in The Multiversity (2014–2015) and forms the Justice Incarnate, a team of superheroes from throughout the multiverse who combat multiversal threats.

=== Captain Carrot (Earth-C/Earth-26) and Super-Squirrel (Earth-C-Minus) ===
The 1980s series Captain Carrot and His Amazing Zoo Crew introduced the parallel Earths of Earth-C and Earth-C-Minus, worlds populated by talking animal superheroes. Earth-C is home to Captain Carrot, an analogue to Superman. Earth-C-Minus parallels the mainstream DC Universe, with animal superheroes as members of the superhero team "Just'a Lotta Animals" (JLA). Superman's Earth C-Minus analogue is Super-Squirrel, a Chiptonian alien who is jealous of Captain Carrot's relationship with the Wonder Woman analogue of the world.

=== Bizarro Superman (Earth 29) ===
Earth-29 is a cube-shaped and ringed Bizarro World in a "damaged continuum" that also hosts Sram (Mars-29), Nnar (Rann-29) and Raganaht (Thanagar-29). It is uncertain whether its Bizarro Superman, therefore, also originated on Notpyrk (Krypton-29).

=== Red Son Superman (Earth-30) ===
The Red Son Superman. Art by Declan Shalvey.

Superman: Red Son explores what would have happened if Superman's ship had crashed in the Soviet Union instead of the United States and was raised under the control of Joseph Stalin. The Red Son Superman's birth name is stated to be Kal-L, the same as the aged pre-Crisis Earth-Two Superman, though he is essentially immortal as shown at the end of this mini-series. Moreover, he is from Earth's distant future and is a descendant of Lex Luthor and Lois Lane. A younger alternative Communist version of the Red Son Superman resides on Earth-30.

=== The Dark Knight Returns Superman (Earth-31) ===
Prior to Flashpoint, Earth-31 is the setting of Frank Miller's The Dark Knight Returns, The Dark Knight Strikes Again and All Star Batman and Robin the Boy Wonder, first visited in Countdown: Arena #1 (2007). In The Dark Knight Returns and its sequel, Superman is a pawn of the American government in a dystopian United States in the supposed 1980s, and mention of him by the media is implied to be strictly forbidden by the Federal Communications Division.

=== Flying Fox Superman (Earth-31) ===
Following Flashpoint in the The New 52 Multiverse, the Earth-31 Superman is a member of the Flying Fox pirate crew on a post-apocalyptic waterworld. The Flying Fox crew is led by a version of Batman named Leatherwing.

=== Super-Martian (Earth-32) ===
On Earth-32, the closest equivalent to Superman is a fusion of that character and the Martian Manhunter, known as Super-Martian. Super-Martian is a member of the Justice Titans.

=== Savior (Earth-34), Supremo (Earth-35), and Optiman (Earth-36) ===
On Earth-34, Savior is the strongest terrestrial metahuman, although his origin and appearance differ from that of Superman, in that he is a survivor of ancient Mu, an Indian Ocean lost continent. Meanwhile, Earth-35's Supremo is its alternate Superman, as is Earth-36's Optiman. Creator Grant Morrison stated that these three Supermen and worlds are based on Justice League pastiches created by other writers for rival DC publishing houses, now pastiched in turn by DC and made a part of its official Multiverse.

=== Zod/Clark Kent (Earth-40) ===
On the world of JSA: The Liberty Files, on the pre-Flashpoint Earth-40, Superman is Zod, a sociopath banished to the Phantom Zone for creating a deadly synthetic plague when he was eleven. When American scientists breached the Zone in an experiment, they found Zod, who feigned having amnesia. Renamed Clark Kent, he was sent to live with the Kents under supervision from the Pentagon, and then began running tests on his powers when they started to develop. Zod fooled most of his superiors by acting dumb, while at the time he was murdering other agents looking for a device called "the Trigger", a device which could simultaneously detonate all power sources on the planet like bombs. Zod, knowing that, if activated, the Trigger would set off nuclear warheads, and that radiation was the only thing that could harm him, wanted the Trigger so he could destroy it. He was finally taken down by the other costumed agents, until the combined forces of the Bat and the Star were able to trap Zod in an orb of nuclear energy in space.

The post-Flashpoint Earth-40 has no such individual resident; it is a pulp fiction world dominated by villains, and an "opposite" world for Earth-20.

=== Chibi Superman (Earth-42) ===
A "Super deformed" version of Superman, Batman and the Justice League of America appeared in Superman/Batman #51 and #52. Grant Morrison's Action Comics (2011) run and The Multiversity later establish this world to be Earth-42 of the Multiverse.

=== Gold Superman (Earth-44) ===
On Earth-44, the Superman of that world is a robot, a member of the Metal Men, robotic versions of Batman, Superman, Wonder Woman, Green Arrow, and Hawkman, created by Doc Tornado, an amalgamation of the Red Tornado and Will Magnus. Their base of operations separated with their Earth and collided with New Earth during Final Crisis #7, but New Earth's magnetic fields causes them to go berserk and attempt "technocide", destroying most of the mementos in the trophy room before they are shut down by Luthor and Dr. Sivana. He is given the name Gold Superman in The Multiversity Guidebook.

=== Superman and Superdoom (Earth-45) ===
Earth-45 is visited in Grant Morrison's Action Comics run. On this world, Clark Kent is a genius who with Jimmy Olsen and Lois Lane intends to invent a robot – Superman – to protect the world. However, the company Overcorp creates a twisted Superman in the form of Superdoom, who rampaged the Multiverse until he was defeated by the Earth-23 Superman.

=== Sunshine Superman (Earth-47) ===
Sunshine Superman is a version of Superman who was initially lost in the destruction of the multiverse after the Crisis. He first appeared as a memory projection of Psycho-Pirate along with his teammates in the Love Syndicate of Dreamworld: Speed Freak (an alternative female version of the Flash) and Magic Lantern (an alternative version of Green Lantern) in Animal Man #23 and 24 (May–June 1990). However, his world was subsequently recreated in the reborn DC Multiverse and he is seen in Final Crisis #7 flying with various other Superman analogues. He is portrayed as a tall, muscular, African-American man with an Afro and a yellow sun shaped S-shield. His name is a reference to the song "Sunshine Superman", by British singer Donovan. In The New 52, Sunshine Superman and other members of his Love Syndicate of Dreamworld exist on Earth-47 (which is based on the culture of the 1970s) and are financed by the immortal teen president "Prez" Rickard .

=== Apollo and Mister Majestic (pre-Flashpoint Earth-50) ===
DC's darker Wildstorm Comics imprint was designated as Earth-50 between 2005 and 2011, but Earth-50 was later merged with Earth-0 at the conclusion of Flashpoint; another Earth-50 then took its place. On the Wildstorm (pre-Flashpoint) Earth-50, Apollo is identified in Final Crisis #7 as a Superman of his world. Apollo was genetically enhanced to be a solar powered super-being. He is a member of the superhero team, the Authority, is openly gay, and is married to Midnighter, an analogue of Batman.

Mister Majestic of the Wildstorm (pre-Flashpoint) Earth-50 is shown in Final Crisis #7 as a Superman analogue. Majestros is an alien warlord from the planet Khera who crashed his ship on Earth thousands of years ago while at war with the Kherans' longtime enemies, the Daemonites. He and his fellow Kherans protect the Earth until the present day inspiring many of Earth's myths and legends. He is also an off and on member of the superhero team the WildC.A.T.s and Earth-50's most powerful hero. For a time, Majestros was transported to the main DC Universe and filled in for Superman while he was trapped in Kandor. Majestros is nearly as strong as Superman with advanced longevity and is a born warrior with great intellectual prowess and centuries of experience.

=== Justice Lord Superman (post-Flashpoint Earth-50) ===
Following Flashpoint and the merger of Earth-0 and the Wildstorm Universe, Earth-50 is home to the Justice Lords, an antagonistic counterpart of the Justice League who were originally created for the Justice League animated series. On this world, Superman murdered President Lex Luthor in retaliation for his killing of the Flash, Wally West, prompting the Justice League to rebrand as the Justice Lords.

=== Icon (Dakotaverse) ===
The superhero Icon is mentioned in Final Crisis: Superman Beyond #2 as being an analogue to Superman. Icon is an alien named Arnus from the planet Terminus who crashes his lifepod in the southern United States in 1839, and is found by an African American slave woman. The lifepod alters his DNA to match the male equivalent of hers, but to a highly evolved rate. After more than a century and a half he does not physically age past the age of 40 and has near Superman-level strength and similar powers. He works as a high-class attorney in his secret identity of Augustus Freeman IV, and protects and resides in the city of Dakota. Originally, Icon resided in an alternative reality of unknown designation until his universe was merged with the mainstream DC Universe after the events of Final Crisis.

=== Kal-El (Unknown Universe) ===
The first African-American version of Superman depicted was in Legends of the DC Universe: Crisis on Infinite Earths (February 1999), which saw a Kal-El and Kara who were husband and wife, and who had been selected as the last survivors of Krypton through polling selection. This Superman died early in the one-shot, leaving Supergirl to carry on, ultimately sacrificing herself.

=== Pocket Superboy (Pocket Universe) ===
The Pocket Universe Superboy was created as an explanation for the existence of the Legion of Super-Heroes after Crisis on Infinite Earths. He originates from a pocket universe created by the Time Trapper and is essentially identical to the Silver Age Superboy, the young version of Superman who becomes a Legion member. This version of Superboy dies saving Earth of the Pocket Universe in Legion of Super-Heroes #38 (1987), years before he would have become Superman.

=== Superboy-Prime (Earth-Prime) ===
Superboy-Prime originates from Earth-Prime, an analogue of the real world with no other superhumans. The Earth-Prime universe was erased during Crisis on Infinite Earths, and Superboy-Prime ended up in a "paradise" dimension where, during that time, he found himself unable to let go of his former life and destiny as Earth's greatest hero. Following a number of conflicts with the heroes of the mainstream DC Universe, the Dark Nights: Death Metal event saw Superboy-Prime returned to his home universe, which was altered from what he knew, but nonetheless his true home.

=== Prime Superman (All-Star Superman) ===
The Superman featured in Grant Morrison's 12-issue All Star Superman, is a compassionate, gentle and altruistic Superman who, according to Morrison, is the Silver Age Superman, or at the very least has a virtually identical backstory.

In his secret identity, Clark Kent acts as a bumbling fool, but each seeming mistake subtly helps those around him. After being overdosed with solar radiation, his cells begin to die, the very source of his powers seemingly killing him. He attempts to make his final adventures as meaningful as possible, revealing his identity to his universe's Lois Lane, aiding the scientist Leo Quintum, and inspiring the Superman Squad of the future.

After a final confrontation with Lex Luthor, Superman flies into the sun to build an artificial heart. Superman is believed dead, remaining within the Sun until his final task is complete. Superman leaves behind his genetic code so that Quintum could create the genetic son of Lois and Clark, the second Superman.

=== Absolute Superman ===
Set on the reality of Alpha World, DC's Absolute Universe line of comics feature a world where superheroes are seen as outcasts and underdogs due to the world having been created and powered by Darkseid.

In this timeline, Superman arrives on Earth as an adolescent, rather than as an infant as depicted in many other versions of the character. Because this version of Kal-El never grew up amongst "Earthlings", he lacks humanity.

=== Other characters known as Superman ===
- Kon-El, the modern Superboy, is a clone created from the combined genetic material of Superman and Lex Luthor. He arrived in Metropolis shortly after Superman's death. Superman sees Superboy as family, giving him the Kryptonian name of Kon-El and the human alias Conner Kent.
- Hank Henshaw was one of several to claim the name of Superman, following the original's death. To differentiate him from the others, the press dubbed him the Cyborg Superman.
- The Eradicator also emerged as a Superman impostor, "the Last Son of Krypton", during the Reign of the Supermen. No longer able to absorb energy directly from the Sun, he used Kal-El's body as a power source. He eventually became delusional and believed himself to be Superman, but this taught him humanity. He eventually gave his life to stop the Cyborg Superman and restore Kal-El's powers.
- John Henry Irons made a suit of armor and cape emblazoned with the Superman-insignia, as tribute to the fallen Man of Steel. Unfortunately, he was lumped in with the other Superman impostors, even though he made no claim to the name. Eventually dubbed "Steel" by the resurrected Superman, he became a close ally and friend to Kal-El.
- The Superman Dynasty is the line of Superman's descendants and successors, featured in DC One Million. In this story, his first direct successor is called Superman Secundus. In the 853rd century, Kal Kent is the last scion of the dynasty, and leader of Justice Legion A.

=== Bizarros ===
Bizarro is the imperfect copy of Superman. There have been many incarnations of the character, varyingly portrayed as evil or as well-meaning but destructive. The Bizarros share many of the strengths and weaknesses of Superman, although there are some minor differences relating to kryptonite coloring and certain Kryptonian powers, for instance the Bizarros have at times been characterized by having heat breath and freeze vision.

- Bizarro Superboy was the first version of Bizarro to appear in comics, making his first (and only) appearance in Superboy #68 (1958). Created by accident, Bizarro Superboy is a misunderstood monster who only wants to be accepted, but most residents of Smallville, including Superboy, regard him as a menace. The only friend he makes is a blind girl, and in the end he sacrifices himself to restore her sight.
- The Silver and Bronze Age Bizarro #1 is accidentally created by Lex Luthor's duplicating ray when he uses it against Superman. Not only does he survive his initial encounter with Superman, he eventually gains a cast of supporting characters such as Bizarro versions of Lois, the Daily Planet staff, and the Justice League, and, eventually, Htrae, a cube-shaped world filled with Bizarros. In the non-canon story Superman: Whatever Happened to the Man of Tomorrow?, Bizarro kills himself after being manipulated by Mr. Mxyzptlk.
- The Man of Steel miniseries, which rebooted the Superman mythology in 1986, presents the first modern Bizarro, who is originally created by Lex Luthor. Because Luthor is unable to adequately replicate Kryptonian DNA, the clones' bodies would degenerate into a chalky-skinned caricature of the Man of Steel. This Bizarro, too, sacrificed his life to restore the eyesight of a blind girl, Lucy Lane, that had befriended him.
- Bizarro #1 is the only modern Bizarro that has survived, although he is not created like the others; having stolen the powers of Mr. Mxyzptlk, the Joker creates him (along with a Bizarro version of Batman, named Batzarro).
- In All-Star Superman, an entire race of Bizarros appear, spawned from a cube-shaped planet in another universe. Originally opaque, shapeless beings, they take on skewed characteristics of people they encounter.
- In Superman: Red Son, Bizarro is one of many creatures created by Lex Luthor and the CIA in attempts to destroy the threat posed by the Communist Superman. After endangering much of London in his battle with Superman, Bizarro sacrifices himself to save the city from a nuclear detonation.
- The Multiversity Guidebook (2015) reveals that Earth-29, also known as Htrae, is a parallel world populated by Bizarro characters.

== Other alternative depictions ==
Between 1989 and 2004, DC's Elseworlds imprint was used to showcase unofficial alternative universe stories; before 1989, "Imaginary Stories" served the same purpose. Since 2004, stories outside of the main DC continuity have carried no particular name or imprint. The examples listed below are just a few of the many alternative versions of Superman depicted in these stories.

=== Frank Miller's Superman ===
Frank Miller's Superman, the Superman of All Star Batman & Robin, the Boy Wonder, is not the same as the Superman of All-Star Superman. The artist of All-Star Batman, Jim Lee, has stated that he is based on the Golden Age Superman, which is why he is shown running on water instead of flying. However, they make no mention of this in the actual comic. Conversely, Frank Miller's Superman is seen flying in his other comics about Batman. This is notionally the same Superman who will evolve to the jingoistic government agent seen in The Dark Knight Returns and The Dark Knight Strikes Again, at least from Miller's authorial point of view, as there is no official canonical link between the All-Star and Dark Knight continuities yet.

=== Superman: The Dark Side ===
In Superman: The Dark Side (1998), Kal-El's rocket is diverted from Earth to Apokolips, and Superman is raised by Darkseid.

=== Superman: True Brit ===
Superman: True Brit is a humorous re-imagining of Superman in which the ship crashed in England and his career as a superhero is severely limited both by glory-averse adoptive parents and the scandal-hungry tabloid press.

=== Superman, Inc. ===
Superman, Inc. sees a world where Kal-El was placed in an orphanage rather than being found directly by the Kents, starting a chain of events that led to 'Dale Suderman' suppressing all memory of his powers after his foster mother died in an accident when she fell down a flight of stairs after witnessing him flying, Dale becoming withdrawn for years until he eventually found an outlet in sports. As a result, he becomes a major sports star and media figure, but when his actions undermine Lex Luthor's position, Luthor's research into his background exposes his otherworldly origins. At the story's conclusion, after a conversation with police detective 'John Jones' about his possible future, Dale goes into hiding as 'Clark Kent', taking journalism classes to find a normal life after publicly proclaiming that he is leaving Earth to investigate his true history and donating his fortune to a charitable foundation.

=== Superman: Kal-El's ===
In Superman: Kal-El's, Kal-El's rocket lands on Earth in the Middle Ages, where he becomes a blacksmith's apprentice in a village ruled by Baron Luthor, who seeks to marry Lady Loisse, daughter of the village's murdered protector Lord Lane. After Kal uses his powers to forge the "silver egg" his parents found him in into a suit of armour for Baron Luthor, he asks for Loisse's hand in marriage as payment, but Luthor takes Loisse to his own bed on her wedding night due to an old feudal law- able to overpower Kal due to a kryptonite gemstone he wears- subsequently beating her to death while raping her. When Kal recovers the following morning, he leads a revolt against Luthor using a sword he forged for himself at the same time as he made Luthor's armour (the sword is implied to be Excalibur) In their final confrontation, Kal manages to kill Luthor, but he is severely wounded by Luthor's gemstone in the process. Following his death, Kal is laid to rest in the lake where Loisse's body was thrown after her death.

=== Superman: Speeding Bullets ===
Superman: Speeding Bullets has Superman found and adopted by the Waynes and christened Bruce. He sees his foster parents murdered in front of him and grows up to be a superpowered Batman, but decides to change tactics after a confrontation with the Joker (in this reality an insane Lex Luthor) and a conversation with Lois about the need for him to inspire rather than intimidate. Earlier imaginary stories, such as the stories of "Bruce (Superman) Wayne" told in Superman (vol. 1) #353, #358 and #363 (1980–1981), also explored the scenario of the infant Kal-El being adopted by the Waynes.

=== Superman: Last Son of Earth ===
Superman: Last Son of Earth is a dramatic role reversal for many Superman traditions. In this story, he is Clark Kent, biological son of Jonathan and Martha Kent, who is sent into space to escape the impending destruction of Earth by collision with a space rock. He lands on Krypton and is adopted by Jor-El and Lara as their son, Kal-El, eventually discovering an Oan power ring.

=== Superman: Secret Identity ===
In Superman: Secret Identity, a teenage boy named Clark Kent in the "real world" (where Superman is a just a comic book character) somehow develops superpowers like those of his namesake. After a brief career as a mysterious, non-costumed "Superboy", Clark dons the fictional character's colors and continues to work in secret as "Superman".

=== Superman & Batman: Generations ===
Superman & Batman: Generations I-III, three limited series which present a unified cohesive history of many elements seen throughout the characters' history, with the characters interacting in real time from the early 20th century onward.

=== Batman: Holy Terror ===
In Batman: Holy Terror (1991), the body of an alien known simply as "the Green Man" with a similar origin to Superman is shown, and his origin is described during this story. When he sees the body of the Green Man, Batman is struck by sorrow, feeling as though the world has lost its greatest hope. During the confrontation with Saul Erdel, the scientists responsible for analysing various superhumans for the Star Chamber, Erdel is killed when a bullet ricochets off the Green Man's chest to strike Erdel.

=== 52 Pick-Up ===
The Booster Gold story arc "52 Pick-Up" briefly depicts a Superman in Booster Gold #3, when showing a timeline where Superman was found by Lionel Luthor and raised as Lionel Jr. alongside Lex Luthor. Lex finds out his brother's secret and ends up killing him a year later.

=== Hypertension ===
The Hypertension storyline in Superboy #60–64 (1999) shows an alternative version of Kon-El named Black Zero. Black Zero is a genetically altered human clone of Superman that has successfully grown to adulthood after Superman is killed by Doomsday. For a time, he acts as the new Superman, even calling himself Superman 2. He exhibits both Superman's abilities as well as Superboy's tactile telekinesis. Without Superman alive to look up to, he instead views Paul Westfield as a father figure. Eventually he turns to evil after a battle between himself and several of Superman's enemies results in the deaths of Matrix, Brainiac and over 300 civilians, causing widespread persecution of clones. He first conquers his Earth, then enlists the help of the New God Metron to travel to alternative realities and conquer them as well to protect the clone community. Black Zero is defeated by the combined efforts of Kon-El, his alternate selves, and the Challengers of the Unknown. Black Zero is lost in Hypertime at the end of the story and has not been seen since.

=== Unlimited Access ===
In Unlimited Access, a limited series which further explored themes introduced in DC vs. Marvel, the hero known as Access formed an amalgamation of what appeared to be the Silver Age versions of Thor and Superman (in his then-current blue energy form). Together, they were known as Thor-El.

=== Just Imagine… ===
In the Just Imagine… series, Superman is reimagined as a police officer from Krypton named Salden who is accidentally transported to Earth and only wishes to go home. He becomes a superhero because he believes Earth's primitive technology is a result of humans squandering their resources fighting crime, corruption, and other ills, and that alleviating these problems will allow humanity to advance to the point of creating a means to send him home. He has superhuman strength and speed, and wears a flying harness. This version was created by Stan Lee and John Buscema.

=== Marvel/DC Crossovers ===
In the majority of the Marvel/DC crossovers, Superman is from the same universe as many Marvel characters, as in an Elseworlds story.

=== JLA: Shogun of Steel ===
JLA: Shogun of Steel (2002), set in feudal Japan, features a Japanese Superman.

=== Supermen/Batmen ===
Multiple versions of Superman appeared in Superman/Batman #25's "Supermen/Batmen", who come to aid the mainstream Superman. Among them are Bizarro #1; Superman Red; a blond-haired Superman; a Superman depicted as a stereotypical African-American; a Superman with a different style "S" shield resembling the Golden Age Superman's in Action Comics #1; and a black-suited, long-haired Superman from "The Return of Superman".

=== Injustice: Gods Among Us ===
Injustice: Gods Among Us (2013) is a video game and tie-in comic book depicting a world in which Superman presides over an authoritarian regime. In this alternate universe, Superman is married to Lois Lane, who becomes pregnant with his child. However, the Joker tricks Superman into killing Lois and their unborn son, and a nuke placed on Lois' heart detonates upon her death, destroying Metropolis and killing millions. Driven over the edge by this, Superman kills the Joker in retaliation at the time when Batman was interrogating Joker. Afterwards, Superman takes drastic measures to "save" the world, forcing people to follow his will and killing those who resist.

=== JLA: The Nail ===
JLA: The Nail and JLA: Another Nail show a Superman in which Kal-El was raised by Amish folk instead of the Kents. His Amish upbringing delays Superman from revealing himself to the world, which places Green Lantern (Hal Jordan) as the leader and most powerful member of the Justice League until Superman's discovery. This Superman is more humble, less in touch with the outside world, calmer and less experienced than other incarnations.

=== Flashpoint ===
In the alternative timeline of the Flashpoint event, Kal-El's rocket crashed directly into Metropolis, resulting in the deaths of over thirty-five thousand people, and the infant was subsequently taken into government captivity to control his powers for uses to make supersoldiers. Without exposure to the sun, Kal-El never develops superpowers and is left emaciated. Sometime later, attempting to rally support in his attempt to restore the timeline to normal, the Flash, aided by Batman and Cyborg break into the facility and rescue Kal-El. Once they break out of the facility into the daylight, Kal-El gains powers and joins the Atlantean/Amazon war

In the sequel series Flashpoint Beyond, the Flashpoint reality is restarted after Prime-Earth's Batman stole the snowglobe containing it from the Time Masters. In this reality's retelling, Kal-El was freed by Batman before he could be captured.

=== Nightwing: The New Order ===
In the alternate universe of Nightwing: The New Order, a major battle takes place in Metropolis between superpowered beings that causes the deaths of millions. During the conflict, Superman was infected with black kryptonite and murders Batman. This results in Nightwing activating a device that depowers ninety percent of the superpowered population. This builds to a future where superpowers are outlawed and any superpowered being must take inhibitor medications or be contained and studied. Despite being depowered, Superman still defends Metropolis as a vigilante with the help of Lex Luthor.

=== Superman: American Alien ===
In Superman: American Alien, by Max Landis, Clark's journey to becoming Superman is shown at different stages in his life. He first manifests his ability to fly while asleep as a child, which causes some trouble when he finds he cannot control it. He eventually gains better control of it and also gains a better understanding of empathy and consequences. As a teenager, he spends his time crushing on Lana Lang and spending time with his friends Pete Ross and Kenny, who are aware of his abilities. Approximately six months later, Clark has created a makeshift costume that includes Batman's cape. After an unknown amount of time, Clark has started to wear the traditional Superman costume and is slowly entering a relationship with Lois.

=== DC X Sonic the Hedgehog ===
Superman appears in the intercompany crossover miniseries DC X Sonic the Hedgehog, which features him and the Justice League teaming up with Sonic and his friends in battling against Darkseid and his forces.

== Homage characters ==
Outside comics published by DC Comics, the notoriety of the Superman or "Übermensch" archetype makes the character a popular figure to be represented with an analog in entirely unrelated continuities.

- Rival publisher Marvel Comics parodies Superman through the character Hyperion. Other Marvel Comics characters that serve as pastiches, homages, or parodies of Superman include Sentry, Gladiator, Ethan Edwards, Captain Ultra, Blue Marvel, and Sun God.
- Amalgam Comics' Super-Soldier is the amalgamated version of Superman and Captain America; Clark Kent volunteered during World War II to become a supersoldier using a combination of an enhancement serum and cells taken from an alien spacecraft, plus a super-charge of solar energy. He carries an adamantium shield which resembles Superman's chest insignia.
- Robert Kirkman's Omni-Man of Image Comics is a clear homage to Superman. Both he and his son are children of a dying extraterrestrial race (though the aliens of Image's universe, the Viltrumites, are hostile).
- "Superduperman!" was a parody comic seen in Mad Magazine #4, in which the title hero has "muscles on muscles", battles Captain Marbles (a parody of Captain Marvel), but in the end is still dismissed as "a creep".
- Image Comics character Supreme, originally a violent, egotistical pastiche of Superman, later retooled by Alan Moore to more closely resemble the Silver Age Superman.
- Malibu Comics features the characters Powerhouse, an unhinged pastiche of Superman with a similar origin story, and Prime (though this character is more closely based on DC's Captain Marvel).
- The Plutonian of Boom! Studios' Irredeemable resembles Superman in many ways: he possesses a similar costume and powers, operates under a bespectacled secret identity, and is the head of his world's premiere team of superheroes, the Paradigm (which contains a few other members similar to the members of the Justice League). However, his lack of control over his powers, perceived ingratitude from the public, and emotional instability eventually cause him to snap under the pressure of protecting the world, becoming a dangerous supervillain. Near the end of the series, it is revealed that the Plutonian is living energy, a "golem" shaped into human form by force of will – but was tragically warped because of the human whose qualities he inherited. He is ultimately reduced back into energy and sent through the multiverse in the hopes that someone can "fix" him; his essence inspires Jerry Siegel and Joe Shuster to create Superman.
- Super-Turtle, an anthropomorphic superheroic turtle, was a series of long-running half-page gag strips that ran in various Silver Age DC comics starting in Adventure Comics #304 in 1963.
- The Maximortal by Rick Veitch (1992–1993) – published under his own King Hell imprint
- SuperDan, a webcomic character who gains Superman-like abilities after being bitten by a radioactive Superman.
- Statesman, the first officially recognized superhero in the City of Heroes game world is a loose analogue to Superman, possessing superhuman speed, strength, senses, breath, and virtual invulnerability. He leads a pair of Justice Society/League-esque teams of heroes at different points in the game's timeline named the Freedom Phalanx, which include homages to characters from both Marvel and DC Comics characters. The character was slain shortly before the game itself was shut down. The character wore a blue and red costume as well, in apparent homage to the colors worn by Superman.
- Samaritan of the Astro City series by Alex Ross and Kurt Busiek.
- Astonishman of The End League.
- Últimos from Ben 10
- Metro Man from Megamind
- Silver Sentry from Teenage Mutant Ninja Turtles
- All Might from My Hero Academia
- Son Goku from Dragon Ball
- Suppaman from Dr. Slump
- Meta Man from The Incredibles
- Major Man from The Powerpuff Girls
- Major Glory from Dexter's Laboratory
- Mighty Mouse
- Strongman from The Mighty Heroes
- A-Ko from Project A-ko
- Blast from One-Punch Man
- Superlópez, a Spanish parody of Superman

== Film and television ==
- In the Superman cartoons produced by Max Fleischer, Superman is much as he appears in the first years of Action Comics ' publication, despite changes in his costume, notably the all-red belt or absence of one in later cartoons, and the S-shield with a darkened blue plane and a red S instead of the yellow plane with the red S. He is said to have been found by "a passing motorist" who brought him to an orphanage. This version of Superman lives in and protects Manhattan rather than Metropolis, although in some cartoons such as "The Bulleteers", Metropolis is clearly named by the antagonists.
- Kirk Alyn starred as Superman in two 15-chapter serials produced by Columbia Pictures, Superman (1948) and Atom Man vs. Superman (1950). In it, Superman has many of the powers demonstrated in the comics. The origin story is similar to what is described in a 1942 novel about Superman, with his foster parents being named Sarah and Eben.
- Adventures of Superman (1952–1958) was a television series that featured George Reeves in the title role, which he first played in the 1951 movie Superman and the Mole Men. While he had many of the powers demonstrated in the comics, they are not shown at the tremendous levels depicted in the contemporary Silver Age comics. The show often featured Superman battling generic gangsters.
- In 1966, Filmation produced The New Adventures of Superman and from 1973 to 1986, Hanna-Barbera produced different versions of the Justice League-influenced Super Friends, both of which were animated series aimed at children. In both cartoons, Superman was similar to his contemporaneous comic book counterpart. In one episode of The World's Greatest Super Friends, the Super Friends battled evil Super Friends from an alternative universe, led by an evil Superman.
- In the 1978 feature film Superman and its sequels, Superman II, Superman III, and Superman IV: The Quest for Peace, Superman is portrayed by Christopher Reeve and is depicted as possessing an array of abilities never before seen in the comics. He was able to erase Lois' memory of his secret identity with a kiss, restore the Great Wall of China with the use of blue eye beams, and possibly teleport among other abilities. Kryptonian foes such as General Zod even demonstrated telekinetic ability.
- In 1988, the producers of Superman (1978) produced a syndicated TV series entitled Superboy which featured John Haymes Newton in the role for one season before he was fired and replaced by Gerard Christopher. The show concentrated on a college-aged Kal-El as a journalism student at Siegel University.
- The 1988 Superman series, produced by Ruby-Spears Productions, offered the first animated incarnation of the post-Crisis Superman. Acting as story editor, Crisis on Infinite Earths writer Marv Wolfman provided several changes to this Superman that included elements from The Man of Steel. In this series, Lex Luthor is not a publicly known criminal, but a rich entrepreneur instead. Clark Kent is Superman's alter ego, instead of the other way around. Furthermore, Martha and Jonathan Kent are still alive in Superman's adulthood in this series. This version of Superman was never Superboy as a teenager, although his powers had appeared very early in childhood. Clark Kent is clumsy in this series.
- In Lois and Clark: The New Adventures of Superman, Dean Cain played the first live-action Superman affected by the changes to the character after Crisis on Infinite Earths, and various elements on the series reference The Man of Steel miniseries, which heavily influenced the show. This is the first live action Superman series that showed Clark Kent as his "real" persona and Superman as the constructed alter ego. As he explained to Lois in the second-season episode "Tempus Fugitive", "Superman is what I can do, Clark is who I am." As the title implies, Clark is the primary identity with Superman making more sporadic appearances. The Lois and Clark version reverses the traditional hairstyle distinction between Clark Kent and Superman; here it is Superman who has slicked-back hair and Clark whose fringe falls more naturally. In neither mode does the character feature his trademark spitcurl, making it one of the few depictions of Superman to lack this distinctive feature. His full name was changed from the comic strip adaptations to Clark Jerome Kent.
- The Superman of the DC animated universe is a synthesis of Superman's 60-plus year history. At first glance, it appears to be an adaptation of The Man of Steel, but also took many aspects of the Silver Age and modernized them. In this continuity, Superman was believed to be the only Kryptonian survivor until Professor Hamilton found a device with access to the Phantom Zone, where two other Kryptonians were found. Kara In-Ze (Supergirl) from Krypton's "sister" planet, Argo, and the artificial intelligence of Brainiac were also shown to be survivors of Krypton's destruction. His archenemy is the "wealthy business tycoon" version of Lex Luthor.
- The Clark Kent of the Smallville TV series leads his life differently, never becoming Superboy, although he secretly performed heroic feats as a teenager and young man before moving to Metropolis and becoming its resident superhero. He meets Lois at a younger age, maintains a complicated friendship with Lex Luthor into young adulthood and for the most part of the series was romantically interested in Lana Lang. Clark's best friends in this version was Chloe Sullivan, who for a while worked as a reporter for the Daily Planet, and for the first few seasons, an African-American Pete Ross.
- In Superman Returns, Brandon Routh takes over the role of Superman. Director Bryan Singer had stated that this film's continuity is based only loosely on the first two Superman films directed by Richard Donner and Richard Lester, and thus Reeve and Routh's Supermen, though similar in places (even having identical fathers—Jor-El played by Marlon Brando and Jonathan Kent played by Glenn Ford), may not be exactly the same individual. For example, the events of the third and fourth films, and Supergirl, are ignored.
- The animated series Legion of Super Heroes features a teenage Superman, who, like the original Superboy, travels to the future to join the Legion. The second season features Kell-El, a clone of Superman from the 41st century.
- The animated series The Batman featured Superman in the two-part season 5 episode "The Batman/Superman Story". This Superman is not related to previous animated versions of the character.
- Clark Kent / Superman is portrayed by Henry Cavill in the DC Extended Universe, first appearing in the 2013 movie Man of Steel, a reboot of the Superman film series. His parents, Jor-El and Lara, imbue Kal-El with the genetic codex of the entire Kryptonian race before sending him to Earth. He arrives on Earth in 1980, and is 33 years old during the present timeline of the film. Jonathan and Martha Kent are depicted as being around 30 when they find him. Jonathan is 46 when he dies in 1997, killed by a tornado outbreak, refusing help from his son to keep his powers secret in what he believed was an unprepared world. Martha helped Clark control his powers while he is young. Deciding it is time for him to find out the reason for why he was sent to Earth, he travels the world and takes a series of odd jobs under assumed identities in his 20s, but leaves each job when he is forced to use his powers for good, leaving a trail of urban legends which Lois Lane eventually finds and investigates. Clark's lifelong secrecy comes to an end when General Zod arrives on Earth to transform Earth into a new Krypton after the destruction of the planet, as he is forced to take the mantle of Superman to stop him. He would later be confronted by Batman in the wake of the destruction his final battle with Zod caused, but teams up with him and Wonder Woman to take down Doomsday (created by Lex Luthor), in which he apparently sacrifices his life in the process. In the 2017 film Justice League and its 2021 director's cut Zack Snyder's Justice League, Clark Kent's body is exhumed and placed in the incubation waters of the Kryptonian ship alongside a Mother Box, which in turn activates and resurrects Superman. This version of Superman appears for the last time to confront Black Adam and is erased from existence when Barry Allen, as The Flash, alters the timeline.
- In James Gunn's DC Universe franchise, Superman is portrayed by David Corenswet and first appears in Superman.
