= Justice Legion Alpha =

Comic superhero team

- The Justice Legion Alpha from DC One Million #1 (November 1998), art by Val Semeiks.

Publication information
- Publisher: DC Comics
- First appearance: JLA #23 (1998)
- Created by: Grant Morrison

In-story information
- Base(s): Jupiter, 853rd century
- Member(s): Aquaman; Batman; Flash; Hourman; Owlwoman; Resurrection Man; Starman; Superman; Wonder Woman

The Justice Legion Alpha is a DC Comics superhero team, who exist in the far future of the DC Universe.

== Publication history ==
Created by Grant Morrison, the team first appeared in the final page of JLA #23 (except The Flash, who was created by Mark Waid and first appeared in Flash 50th Anniversary Special (1990)).

== Fictional team biography ==
In the 853rd century, the institutions of the Justice League of America (JLA) and the Legion of Super-Heroes have developed into the Justice Legions, various teams of superhumans who act to protect the Milky Way. The highest ranking of these is the Justice Legion Alpha, who have their base on Jupiter and are responsible for protecting the Solar System (the second rank is Justice Legion Beta, the third is Justice Legion Gamma, and so on). While Alpha resembles the JLA, other legions resemble teams such as the Teen Titans, Young Justice, the Legion of Super-Heroes, and the Legion of Super-Pets.

During the Convergence storyline, the Metropolis of the 853rd century is among the cities contained in domes on Telos. Owlwoman was mentioned to have fallen in battle as Batman tells Superman to hang her picture up on the wall of their fallen comrades. When the domes are destroyed, the Justice Legion battles the Crime Syndicate.

== Members ==
Justice Legion Alpha is made up of future analogs of modern heroes. Their membership includes:

- Superman: The latest in the Superman dynasty that stretches from modern times to the 853rd century. One of the intervening Supermen married a queen from the fifth dimension, granting the succeeding Supermen ten additional senses. The original Superman, having obtained godlike abilities, lives in the heart of the Sun and grants powers to his descendants so long as they continue to protect Earth.
- Wonder Woman: A marble statue granted life by the Goddess of Truth. She has similar powers to the original and also carries two shape-changing weapons similar in nature to Diana's invisible jet, which typically act as her sentient bracelets, Charity and Harmony. She operates from Venus.
- Batman: Pluto is now a penal colony. When the current Batman was a child, he lived with his prison-guard parents on Pluto before they were killed by prisoners. Remembering the legend of the original Batman, he decided it would take someone of extraordinary will to control the prison and took command himself. He has trained his whole life to become a perfect crime-fighter and also has numerous technological enhancements. His sidekick is a robot called Robin, the Toy Wonder.
- Flash: Originally from the 27th century, the time traveling speedster John Fox had met Wally West, the 20th-century Flash, before he wound up in the 853rd century. He operates from Mercury.
- Aquaman: King of the oceanic planet of Neptune. Unlike the original Aquaman, he has a more fish-like appearance, as well as the psionic ability to control water.
- Hourman: An android with the memories of Rex Tyler, the original Hourman. He has mastery over time and space made possible by a cosmic artifact, the Worlogog.
- Starman: Farris Knight is a direct descendant of Ted Knight, although his specific family only took up the Starman legacy starting with his great-grandfather. He monitors the artificial sun Solaris and lives in a space station that exists where Uranus once was.
- Resurrection Man: Mitch Shelley, still unable to die, has become the team's tactician, replacing Martian Manhunter (who has since fused with Mars). He has a device on his arm that kills him in a controlled manner, letting him choose which powers he acquires upon resurrecting.
- The Atom: The Atom of the 853rd century is a scientist and the only survivor of an alternate universe that was consumed by the main universe. Instead of simply shrinking himself like other Atoms, he can divide his mass into duplicates of himself, spreading the same amount of matter across his clones. When they reach atomic scale, the Atoms can arrange themselves into a variety of molecular configurations.
- Owlwoman: Little is known about the Owlwoman of the 853rd century except that she is the child of a human father and a Qwardian mother and possesses an advanced flight harness that grants her the ability to travel at the speed of light.
