= The Multiversity =

Comic book limited series

- Cover of The Multiversity #1 (October 2014); art by Ivan Reis and Joe Prado

Publication information
- Publisher: DC Comics
- Schedule: Monthly
- Format: Limited series
- Genre: Superhero
- Publication date: August 2014 – April 2015
- No. of issues: 9

Creative team
- Written by: Grant Morrison
- Artist(s): Ivan Reis, Frank Quitely, Cameron Stewart, Chris Sprouse, Karl Story, Ben Oliver, Doug Mahnke

Collected editions
- Deluxe Edition: ISBN 978-1401256821

The Multiversity is a two-issue limited series combined with seven interrelated one-shots set in the DC Multiverse in The New 52, a collection of universes seen in publications by DC Comics. The one-shots in the series were written by Grant Morrison, each with a different artist. The Multiversity began in August 2014 and ran until April 2015.

== Background and creation ==
In the conclusion to the 1985 comic book crossover Crisis on Infinite Earths, the DC Multiverse collapsed, merging the history of five universes into one single new universe. In the 1998–1999 series The Kingdom, author Mark Waid and co-creator Grant Morrison introduced the concept of Hypertime, a super-dimensional construct that allowed for all publications to be canon or in-continuity somewhere. Hypertime, although infrequently used, was a replacement and explanation for the multiple timelines and histories DC had published through the years.

In the 2005–06 crossover event Infinite Crisis, the survivors of the first Crisis—Alexander Luthor Jr. from Earth-Three, Superboy-Prime from Earth-Prime, and Kal-L of Earth-Two—attempted to create a perfect world to replace the current DC Universe (DCU), with Luthor restoring, merging, and destroying worlds that had once existed in the Multiverse or were featured in various Elseworlds publications. Luthor failed, due to the intervention of the universe's heroes, and inadvertently altered the history of the DC Universe. Following Infinite Crisis, a single Earth and universe existed in the DCU as a result of Luthor's actions; however, it was later revealed that this was not actually the case and that the Multiverse still existed at this time. Prior to the publication of Infinite Crisis, editor Dan DiDio revealed that Hypertime no longer exists in the DCU.

Following Infinite Crisis, the year-long weekly maxiseries 52 (2006–2007) led to the revelation that the Multiverse still exists, in the form of 52 alternate universes. Morrison stated that the return of the Multiverse was intended to launch new franchises, explaining:

The parallel Earths you see in issue #52 are not the familiar pre-Crisis versions. If you think you recognize and know any of these worlds from before, you'd be wrong. We all wanted to do something new with the multiple Earths so what you've already seen in 52 is simply the tip of the iceberg – each parallel world now has its own huge new backstory and characters and each could basically form the foundation for a complete line of new books. If you like the ongoing soap opera dynamics of New Earth, you can watch Mary Marvel turning to the dark side as her skirt gets shorter and shorter, or you can buy the Earth 5 line of books featuring more iconic versions of the Marvel Family. If you miss Vic Sage as the Question, you should be able to follow the adventures of Vic's counterpart on the Charlton/Watchmen world of Earth 4. The idea behind the Megaverse [sic] is to basically create a number of big new franchise possibilities. It's like having several comics companies and universes under one umbrella, so, as I say, there could be one book or a whole line of books spinning out of the new Earth 10 (I handled that particular revamp, so I can tell you that the original concept of the Freedom Fighters on a world where the Nazis won World War 2 has been greatly reconsidered, expanded and intensified into something that's a bit more Wagnerian and apocalyptic and a bit more adult). That's how I'd like to see the Megaverse played out as we move forward. And no crossovers! Each of the parallel universes should exist in its own separate stream with no contact from the others – not until we have a story worthy of bringing them together.

In 2007–08, the weekly series Countdown (a.k.a. Countdown to Final Crisis) was published as a follow-up to 52 and lead-in to DC's next line-wide crossover event Final Crisis, along with various spin-off titles featuring the new Multiverse. The Multiverse plays a large part in the Final Crisis (2008–2009) series, where a team of Supermen from across the Multiverse assemble to defeat a rogue Monitor, Mandrakk. The series introduced Calvin Ellis, a version of Superman from Earth-23 who is the President of the United States. Grant Morrison based the character on Barack Obama. The character would later appear in Grant Morrison's Action Comics #9 (July 2012) and was a central character in The Multiversity. Final Crisis was described by editor Dan DiDio as the finale in a trilogy of stories about the Multiverse, describing each Crisis: "The death of the Multiverse, the rebirth of the Multiverse, and now the ultimate story of the Multiverse."

When asked about their future role in expanding the Multiverse following Final Crisis, Morrison stated: "I'm in the early stages of putting together material for a Multiverse series but I want to spend a lot of time getting it exactly right, so there are currently no deadlines and I don't anticipate any of this coming out until 2010." Morrison later revealed that they had been working on a new book set on Earth-4, featuring Charlton Comics characters, but inspired by Alan Moore and Dave Gibbons's 1986 limited series Watchmen, which in turn was proposed initially as being based on Charlton Comics characters.

In Wizard #212 (April 2009), Morrison detailed their project, The Multiversity, intended for publication in 2010. Morrison states that the series: "will pick up a bunch of strands from 52 and Final Crisis." They noted that their work would include a one-shot for each of seven different universes, where they "all link together as a seven-issue story that re-imagines the relationship between the DCU and the Multiverse."

Morrison provided Jeffrey Renaud of Comic Book Resources with further details, explaining the reasoning behind the project: "The idea was to do seven books that would be #1 issues for seven different teams on seven different Earths. Each of these would be the bible for what could potentially be an entire comic line for each of these Earths." Originally, their co-writers (Geoff Johns, Mark Waid, and Greg Rucka) on 52 were to have participated in the project.

We were all – that's me and Greg [Rucka] and Geoff Johns and Mark Waid – going to each do a Multiverse book. Waid was going to do the Shazam world. And Greg was going to do the Earth-4, the kind of Charlton world, and I think Geoff was going to do Earth-2 and I was going to do Earth-10. At the end, it didn't work out but I really liked the idea so I came back to it and built this story over it.

— Grant Morrison

In 2010, it was revealed that Morrison's frequent collaborators Cameron Stewart and Frank Quitely were, at the time, the only artists chosen for The Multiversity. Quitely would illustrate Pax Americana, featuring Morrison's reworking of the Charlton characters, based on Earth-4. Stewart's one-shot would be Thunderworld, focusing on Captain Marvel of Earth-5. Artist Frazer Irving stated that Morrison "reserved a small part of my soul" to do work on The Multiversity.

In 2011, DC Comics announced that its entire line of publications would be cancelled following Flashpoint (2011), leading into a rebooted DC Universe known as The New 52. The finale of Flashpoint #5 (September 2011) saw three distinct universes from the Multiverse—WildStorm Universe, Vertigo, and the DC Universe—merge into one universe, designated 'Prime Earth' (also later stated to be designated as Earth-33). Dan DiDio clarified that there was still a Multiverse, but gave no details on how it had changed and suggested that The Multiversity might provide answers. Morrison later revealed that The Multiversity would not be out until 2012, noting that Quitely had just begun working on his issue. Morrison also gave a definitive length for the series, nine one-shots, where two are book-ends with the other seven each focusing on a different universe. Tonally, Morrison has described The Multiversity as feeling similar to their work on Seven Soldiers (2005).

In September 2012, as part of MorrisonCon, DC Entertainment officially confirmed The Multiversity, giving the series a publication date of late 2013. It was also revealed that the series would feature eight one-shot issues, each issue being 38 pages plus an eight-page backup. Morrison also confirmed that The Multiversity had not been affected by anything in The New 52, but would still feature a "little sort of wave over to the DC Universe," and that The New 52 fits "really nicely into the scheme without doing any damage."

In February 2013, Morrison stated that they had created a guidebook for DC's Multiverse, incorporating all 52 alternate universes, which other authors reference when working with the Multiverse concept. The guidebook was included as the sixth installment of The Multiversity and was published in January 2015; it contained maps and blueprints to the Multiverse as well as brief descriptions of the meta-humans that populate 45 out of its 52 alternate Earths (with details about Earths 14, 24, 25, 27, 28, 46 and 49 omitted entirely). The only information given in Multiversity about these seven planets is that, in each case, the Earths were 'Created by an Inner Chamber of 7 Monitor Magi for a mysterious purpose yet to be revealed.'

== Publication history ==
In April 2014, The Multiversity was announced for publication in August 2014. The announcement also revealed more of the series' artists including Chris Sprouse, Karl Story, Ben Oliver, Frank Quitely, Cameron Stewart, Ivan Reis, and Joe Prado. In May 2014, the first issue, by artists Ivan Reis and Joe Prado, was officially solicited by DC Comics. Each subsequent one-shot was published monthly.

In July 2014, during San Diego Comic-Con, DC Comics held a panel titled "The Multiversity Enrollment", featuring creators Grant Morrison and Cameron Stewart with editor Eddie Berganza. Posters, featuring a map of the Multiverse, designed by Morrison and Rian Hughes, were handed out to attendees of the panel. DC later included a version of the map as a "Channel 52" exclusive at the end of books published in the week of July 28, 2014.

In May 2015, a director's cut of the Pax Americana one-shot was published.

== Synopsis ==
The Multiversity featured a story arc about the DC Comics Multiverse being invaded by a race of extradimensional parasites known as The Gentry. The Gentry come from beyond the immediate DC "local" multiverse, and each member is a cultural fear or "bad idea" personified as a living, demonic entity. Intellectron is the immoral genius; Demogorgunn is the mindless, sprawling horde; Hellmachine is unchecked, uncontrollable technology; Dame Merciless is the ultimate extreme of the femme fatale; and Lord Broken is insanity and despair.

The Gentry were drawn to the Multiverse by the emanations of ruined dreams and negative ideas and they seek to seize ownership of every single mind in existence and, in so doing, to control all thoughts and stories. To this end, they create and use Ultra Comics #1, a "haunted" comic book that can affect and even control its readers, as a vector to infect the Multiverse as well as simultaneously launch an attack on every Earth in the Orrery of Worlds.

Various heroes from across the Multiverse are forced to band together, calling themselves Justice Incarnate, to face this extra-dimensional threat and initiate the "Battle for All Creation."

== Structure ==
The series contains nine issues and consists of six one-shots, a guidebook containing a map of the Multiverse and entries describing each of the 52 Earths, and a two-part story bookending the one-shots and serving as a prologue and conclusion—which Morrison described as an "80-page giant DC super-spectacular story." Each one-shot takes place in a different universe, and each publication features different trade dress and a different storytelling approach. Morrison explains: "each comic looks like it comes from a different parallel world, so they're all slightly different."

Morrison stated that when developing the series, they had to think of a way for the featured universes to communicate with each other. They recalled the "Flash of Two Worlds" storyline from The Flash #123, where the adventures of the Golden Age Flash (Jay Garrick of Earth-2) were documented as a comic book on Earth-1. Morrison incorporated this device into The Multiversity, stating "they're reading each other's adventures, so there's some way that if a real big emergency arises, they can communicate using comic books. So each world has a comic from the previous world which has clues to the disaster that's coming their way, and they all have to basically start communicating using writers and artists so it's my big, big statement." Morrison further explained how the device was used to create a cohesive story: "[I]t's almost like a baton race or a relay race where each of the worlds can read a comic book that's published in their world but which tells the adventures of the previous world. The characters are actually reading the series along with the readers."

=== The Multiversity #1 ===
The first chapter, illustrated by Ivan Reis, Joe Prado, and Nei Ruffino, The Multiversity features heroes from all 52 of the Earths in the DC Universe coming together to battle an attack by the Gentry on the Multiverse. Morrison described The Multiversity as a big team book, featuring characters from all over the Multiverse, and featuring a team that looks "after the welfare of the entire multiverse and they're headquartered in a place called the Multiversity." Morrison compared the team to a Justice League of the Multiverse. The team includes characters such as Earth-26's Captain Carrot as well as Thunderer, an Aboriginal version of Marvel Comics' Thor from Earth-7.

The story involves Monitor Nix Uotan travelling to Earth-7 only to find it destroyed with Thunderer as its only living superhero. Uotan is attacked and turned into an evil version of himself by the extradimensional monsters of The Gentry. The story then switches to Earth-23 and features Calvin Ellis, the Superman of this world, being pulled into a parallel universe "doorway" created by Earth-23's Lex Luthor, sending Ellis to the Hall of Heroes (or Multiversity), an interdimensional gathering place for heroes from all 52 Earths. The Hall is also referred to as Valla-Hal and Monitor Station Infinity. It is here Ellis meets heroes from the rest of the Multiverse who have also been summoned there as well and travels to Earth-8 to try and stop the Gentry's invasion. The story ends with the appearance of an evil Nix Uotan on Earth-8, a version of Uotan that has been corrupted by the Gentry. The Multiversity #1 was published in August 2014.

=== The Society of Super-Heroes: Conquerors of the Counter-World ===
The second chapter, illustrated by Chris Sprouse and Karl Story, The Society of Super-Heroes: Conquerors of the Counter-World ("SOS") features the Society of Super-Heroes from Earth-20 and their villainous counterparts from Earth-40. The Society of Super-Heroes is a pulp-style Justice Society of America, led by Doc Fate, and had previously appeared in Final Crisis: Superman Beyond. Morrison describes him as "kind of a Doc Savage-cum-Doctor Fate guy who teams with the Mighty Atom, the Immortal Man, Lady Blackhawk and her Blackhawks, and Abin Sur, the Green Lantern. It's all kind of a 1940s retro thing. As I say, it's a pulp take on superheroes," along with other recreated "primitive pulp characters". Morrison described this Earth as having a population of only "two billion people, even though it's 2012, as a result of a recent global war akin to World War II on Earth-20, albeit directed against a scion of the al-Ghul dynasty and an alliance of Arab/Islamic states called the "Desert Crescent".

The story begins with Doctor (Doc) Fate assembling a group that includes the Immortal Man, the Atom of Earth-20 (The Mighty Atom), an all-female version of the Blackhawks and Green Lantern Abin Sur to face the threat of parallel Earth-40 being on a "collision course" with their own world. It is revealed that Earth-20 and Earth-40 share a binary orbit which causes them to overlap every 100,000 years. Earth-40 invades and devastates Earth-20, waging a global war against the Society of Super-Heroes in defense of their alternate universe. After five years of fighting, Doc Fate and his S.O.S. team thwart a plan by Vandal Savage, Felix Faust, Parallax, Lady Shiva and an army of Savage's undead Necro-Men to conquer Earth-20. Immortal Man stabs and kills Vandal Savage with a piece of the fallen meteorite that gave them both their powers thousands of years before. Savage is revealed to have planned and desired his own death, however, as his blood opens a gateway to the larger Multiverse. After remaining dormant for 3,000 years, a giant stone statue named Niczhuotan rises from the ground, re-animates and begins to speak. The story ends with Immortal Man calling out an S.O.S. for anyone on parallel Earths to come together and fight the coming invasion of Gentry forces. The Society of Super-Heroes: Conquerors of the Counter-World was published in September 2014.

=== The Just ===
The third chapter, illustrated by Ben Oliver, The Just features a world of legacy characters and children of superheroes from Earth-16, such as Connor Hawke and the Super-Sons. "This is those guys but they're not the main heroes. There's a whole younger generation of heroes—kind of media brats almost." Morrison describes them as "children of superheroes—a son of Superman, a son of Batman, et cetera—who exist in a world where they have incredible abilities, but the previous generation had ushered in a utopia, so they don't really have any notion of where to direct it, and they're very unhappy with the world as is." Morrison cites MTV's The Hills as their inspiration for The Just. Morrison described the idea: "What happens when your mom and dad fix everything? Superman, Batman and Wonder Woman have kind of fixed everything so the kids have nothing to do", instead resorting to battle reenactments, "these kids, they dress up but they've never fought anything." Morrison had originally conceptualized a "Super-Sons" story as part of their All-Star Superman series, where Superman and Batman had stopped all crime, noting that "[o]ne day, I might get to them or some version of it. There's a little bit of that in the "Multiversity" series that I'm doing". Morrison originally designated this universe as Earth-11. The one-shot was published in October 2014.

In this chapter of the story, Dame Merciless is the Gentry member who is assigned to this world, working confusion and disorientation into the lives of Kyle Rayner/Green Lantern, Alexis Luthor and Offspring, as well as appearing in a piece of artwork by Kon-El/Superboy.

=== Pax Americana ===
The fourth chapter, illustrated by Frank Quitely, Pax Americana: In Which We Burn, takes place on Earth-4 and features characters from Charlton Comics. It has been described by Morrison as: "if Alan Moore and Dave Gibbons had pitched the Watchmen now, rooted in a contemporary political landscape." Rather than the Cold War focus of Watchmen, the title's focus is on international terrorism and conspiracy in a world of superheroes. The story is told with an eight-panel grid, similar to Watchmen's nine-panel grid layout. The story is based around musical harmonics, as each world in the Multiverse vibrates at a different frequency, with Quitely explaining: "music, and vibration… musical vibrations, the octave, the eight as a repeated motif, and creating patterns leading the eye around the page in a specific way." Morrison describes Pax Americana as their Citizen Kane. The Captain Atom of this universe had been introduced in Final Crisis as his world's analogue to Superman. Morrison describes the Question as "a little bit like Rorschach but absolutely nothing like Rorschach." Peacemaker is described as a good guy, but he assassinates the President of the United States.

The story revolves around the assassination and the failures on the part of the Charlton characters. The one-shot was published in November 2014.

=== Thunderworld Adventures ===
The fifth chapter, illustrated by Cameron Stewart, Thunderworld Adventures takes place on Earth-5 and features characters from the Captain Marvel family. Morrison described this book as "a classic Shazam book but it's done in a way almost like a Pixar movie or the way we did All Star Superman. It captures the spirit of those characters without being nostalgic or out of date." Morrison called it their "attempt to see if you can get the pure note of Captain Marvel, with no irony and no camp and just make it work for everyone. It's like a myth, a little folk tale. It's pure." The one-shot was published in December 2014.

In this chapter, Doctor Sivana reads a copy of The Society of Super-Heroes: Conquerors of the Counter-World, and the comic book inspires him to recruit an army of alternate versions of himself from across the multiverse. Sivana and the Legion of Sivanas pool their resources to develop synthetic, crystallized time called Suspendium, and they use their invention to create an eighth day of the calendar week called Sivanaday. Sivana then pilots a gigantic, technological copy of the Rock of Eternity into the heart of the Multiverse and captures the wizard Shazam.

Sivana's machinations result in time distortions all over Fawcett City. While reporting for WHIZ Media, Billy Batson sees a vision of himself from the future, warning his past self to keep careful track of time. Billy is suddenly attacked by Doctor Sivana's children: Magnificus, Thaddeus Sivana Jr., and Georgia, all of whom have been given superpowers to rival the Marvel Family. Billy transforms into Captain Marvel and battles the Sivanas and the Monster Society of Evil with assistance from Mary Marvel, Captain Marvel Jr., the Lieutenant Marvels, and Mr. Tawky Tawny.

Captain Marvel journeys through the Multiverse to the Rock of Eternity to put a stop to Sivana's scheme. He discovers that Sivana has stolen the secret of Shazam's magic lightning and assumed a muscular form called Black Sivana. Black Sivana appears to be winning the fight, but Captain Marvel transforms back into Billy Batson and uses the Suspendium crystals to transmit a message back through time. The meaning of the message is revealed: each member of the Legion of Sivanas stole Suspendium from the group, depriving Sivanaday of the full 24 hours needed to last a complete day. Sivanaday runs out of time and Sivana loses his powers. Having saved the day, Captain Marvel and the Marvel Family fly off to their next big adventure.

=== Guidebook ===
The sixth chapter, illustrated by various artists, featured the Multiversity Guidebook, consisting of detailed entries on all 52 Earths, a map showcasing "all known existence", and a history of the "Crisis" events. The one-shot was published in 80-Page Giant format in January 2015.

In this chapter, the Little League of the chibi Earth-42 is attacked by the Legion of Sivanas. The Batman of Earth-42 must team up with the displaced Batman of the post-apocalyptic Earth-17 to escape from the Sivanas' army of killer robots. While the Batmen attempt to activate the device used by the Sivanas for crossing from Earth to Earth, the Batman of Earth-42 learns about events transpiring on Earth-51 by reading about them in the Multiversity Guidebook comic, where they appear as fictional characters.

On Earth-51, Kamandi, Prince Tuftan, and Ben Boxer investigate a mysterious tomb on the Island of the God-Watchers. They are observed from afar by the New Gods of Supertown, who identify the tomb as the place where Darkseid was caged and contained. It is revealed by the New Gods of Earth-51 that they can exist across the Multiverse as "emanations." It is also revealed that Darkseid has been freed from his tomb by the Monitor Nix Uotan – unleashed to assume new forms and spread evil across all reality.

The Batman of Earth-17 escapes to the House of Heroes with the Multiversity Guidebook, only to arrive just as Gentry member Hellmachine launches an all-out assault. The slain members of the Little League return to life, commanded to live and die over and over again by the unseen master of the Gentry: the all-powerful "Empty Hand."

=== Mastermen ===
The seventh chapter, illustrated by Jim Lee and Scott Williams, Mastermen, takes place on Earth-10, and features characters from Quality Comics as part of the Freedom Fighters and Nazi versions of various heroes. The concept is borrowed from Earth-X, a universe where Nazi Germany won World War II, featured in stories before Crisis on Infinite Earths. Morrison describes this one-shot as a "big, dark Shakespearean story." The members of this world's Freedom Fighters include a Jewish Phantom Lady, a homosexual Ray, and an African Black Condor, with other members also being representative of groups targeted by the Nazis, such as Doll Man and Doll Woman, who are Jehovah's Witnesses. Overman, the Superman of this world, landed on Earth in 1939 in Nazi territory and was raised by Adolf Hitler. The story is set around a utopia built by this world's Superman after he realizes the evil nature of Hitler; this Superman "knows his entire society, though it looks utopian, was built on the bones of the dead. Ultimately it's wrong and it must be destroyed." The one-shot was published in February 2015.

In this chapter, Kal-L landed in the contested Sudetenland in 1939 and his ship was discovered by the Nazis. Kal-L is dubbed Overman by Adolf Hitler and is raised to be a living super-weapon and a symbol of Nazi supremacy. In April 1956, Overman presided over the fall of the United States amidst the devastation of Washington, D.C. Sixty years later, in 2016, Overman is a member of the New Reichsmen, his world's version of the Justice League, which consists of the Valkyrie Brunnhilde (an alternate Wonder Woman), Underwaterman (an alternate Aquaman), Leatherwing (an alternate Batman whose grandfather was Hans von Hammer, the protagonist of Enemy Ace), Blitzen/Lightning (an alternate version of the Flash, who is a female speedster), the Martian (an alternate Martian Manhunter), and unnamed alternate versions of Green Lantern and the Red Tornado. The world is a technologically advanced utopia, built on the genocide of millions. Overman is haunted by the death of his cloned sister, Overgirl, and has recurring nightmares of a towering, ruined house – Lord Broken of the Gentry.

After the Human Bomb attacks an Overgirl memorial in Metropolis, Overman and the Reichsmen attempt to uncover the truth behind a new terrorist organization called the Freedom Fighters and their leader, the mysterious figure known only as "Uncle Sam." Uncle Sam warns of a terrible revenge for the Nazi atrocities of the past, and the Reichsmen suspect that they have a traitor on the team. Overman has growing doubt about his cause, but prepares to attend a performance of Der Ring des Nibelungen with his wife Lena.

Uncle Sam carries out his master plan, and the Human Bomb detonates on board the Reichsmen's orbiting satellite base. The damaged satellite falls to Earth, and Overman is unable to stop it from crashing into the city of Metropolis. Millions die from the crash and the city is utterly destroyed with Overman as the only survivor, left alone in a crater of ash. This destruction of Metropolis is said to mark "the beginning of the end" of the Nazi empire.

=== Ultra Comics ===
The eighth chapter, illustrated by Doug Mahnke and Christian Alamy, Ultra Comics takes place on Earth-33 (aka Earth-Prime) and features Ultraa, the first superhero of this world. Earth-33 serves in the DC Universe as a version of the "real world" (the readers' Earth), a planet with no superheroes other than those appearing in comic books. On Earth-33, there is even a DC Comics that publishes the stories of the heroes of the Multiverse as comics, particularly the stories of heroes from Earth-1 and Earth-2. Morrison describes this book as "the most advanced thing I've ever done. I'm so excited about this. It's just taking something that used to be done in comics and captions that they don't do anymore and turning it into a technique, a weapon, but beyond that I don't want to say. It's a haunted comic book, actually, it's the most frightening thing anyone will ever read. It's actually haunted—if you read this thing, you'll become possessed." This one-shot was published in March 2015.

The eighth chapter of the series concerns the creation of Ultra Comics: a synthetic, comic book superhero created by "memesmiths" to battle and defeat a dangerous idea designated as a Hostile Independent Thought-Form. After exploring the ruins of a bizarre, post-apocalyptic New York City, Ultra Comics is betrayed and the Hostile Independent Thought is revealed to be Intellectron of the Gentry. Collaborating with the Gentry are the "Neighbourhood Guard", a group of feral, cannibal children, and other versions of Ultra characters from the DC Multiverse, including Ultra-Man, Ultra the Multi-Alien and several others. The Ultras all serve Ultraa, consort of Maxima and joint ruler of her homeworld of Almerac. Ultra Comics is ultimately destroyed by Intellectron, but not before Ultra Comics is able to capture Intellectron and contain it in the last page of the comic – effectively sealing it inside the end of the narrative. The final caption ominously warns the reader that their mind has become infected simply by reading the comic.

=== The Multiversity #2 ===
The ninth and final chapter, illustrated by Ivan Reis and Joe Prado, The Multiversity #2 features the final battle between the Gentry and the combined superheroes of the DC Comics Multiverse, under the name of Justice Incarnate. The issue was published in April 2015.

The corrupted Monitor Nix Uotan opens doorways across the Multiverse that allow the Gentry to complete their invasion, despite attacks from Aquawoman, Thunderer, President Superman, Captain Carrot, Red Racer, and the Retaliators of Earth-8. Ultimately, Nix Uotan is freed from Gentry control by the Red Racer, working in tandem with every speedster superhero in existence. Uotan reveals that he resisted the Gentry while under their control and arranged for the same doorways that summoned the Gentry to summon the champions of the Multiverse. The Harbinger AI from the House of Heroes transmits a cosmic SOS across every Earth, calling on all superheroes everywhere to rise to the defense of their worlds.

The Gentry are defeated and driven back. A small group of superheroes pursue the Gentry to the ruined world of Earth-7, where they discover that the members of the Gentry that they fought were merely part of a vast legion of Gentries. The Gentries labor to complete a Multiverse-destroying doomsday weapon called the Oblivion Machine and are watched over by their master – a shadowy, unknowable entity called "the Empty Hand." The Empty Hand informs the gathered heroes that its assessment of the Multiverse is finished and it then effortlessly banishes the heroes from Earth-7.

Back at the House of Heroes, the assembled super-beings of the Multiverse vow to work together to protect their worlds from future threats to reality. Organized by President Superman of Earth-23, they form a pan-universal super-team called Justice Incarnate. The superheroes offer to reward Nix Uotan for his role in the rescue of multi-trillions of lives. At first, Nix Uotan declines, but then he remembers something and asks for a small favor. The story ends with Nix in his human form, waking from a dream, now able to pay the $800 that he owed his landlord with money given to him by the heroes of the Multiverse.

== Collected editions ==
The series has been collected into a single volume:

- The Multiversity Deluxe Edition (collects all issues of The Multiversity, 448 pages, hardcover, October 21, 2015, ISBN 978-1401256821)
- Absolute Multiversity – collects The Multiversity #1–2, The Multiversity Guidebook #1, Multiversity: The Society of Super Heroes #1, Multiversity: The Just #1, Multiversity: Pax Americana #1, Multiversity: Thunderworld #1, Multiversity: Mastermen #1 and Multiversity: Ultra Comics #1. Release date: July 19, 2022. ISBN 978-1-77951-561-2

== Future ==
On the future of the Multiverse, Morrison explained, "each one of the episodes also sets up a potential series. You could do a Multiverse range of books out of this. All of them are designed to be issue one of potential long-running series as well as being self-contained. It's been a storytelling challenge, but the whole idea is to set stuff up for future development – not necessarily by me, but by DC in some way." At San Diego Comic-Con 2015, Morrison announced a series of original graphic novels under the title Multiversity Too. The series will continue to be written by Morrison, with the first entry, Multiversity Too: The Flash scheduled to debut in 2016. In December 2017, Morrison noted the project was paused, citing the "great" multiverse exploration in the Flash comics and television series.

Since 2022, DC features new Multiversity titles:

- Multiversity: Teen Justice (2022)
- Multiversity: Harley Screws Up the DCU (2023)
