= Hammerlock (disambiguation) =

Hammerlock is a form of the armlock in wrestling and martial arts. It may also refer to one of the following:

- Hammerlock (dance), a type of dance handhold
- Hammerlock (film), a 2000 comedy film
- Hammerlock (band), a rock band
- Hammerlock (coupling link), the method for locking a CM Hammerlok Coupling Link for connecting chain.

== See also ==
- Hammerlocke, a DC Comics science fiction limited series
