= Thomas Joyner =

Thomas Joyner could refer to:

- Tom Joyner (born 1949), American radio host
- Tom Joyner (writer), American comic book writer and academic

== See also ==
- Thomas Joiner (born 1965), American psychologist
