= Superman (Kal Kent) =

- Kal Kent, as depicted in JLA #1,000,000 (September 1998), art by Howard Porter.

Publication information
- Publisher: DC Comics
- First appearance: JLA #15 (February 1998)
- Created by: Grant Morrison (based upon the original character by Jerry Siegel and Joe Shuster)

In-story information
- Alter ego: Kal Kent
- Team affiliations: Justice Legion Alpha; Superman Squad
- Abilities: Evolved Kryptonian powers Force vision Telepathy; Extrasensory perception Electrokinesis; Kryptonite immunity Red Sun immunity Superhuman strength

Kal Kent is a superhero who appears in American comic books published by DC Comics, created by Grant Morrison. He is the Superman of the 853rd century and a descendant of the original Superman (Kal-El). He first appeared in JLA #15 (February 1998).

== Fictional character biography ==
=== DC One Million ===
In the 853rd century, the progenitor of the Superman dynasty, Superman (Kal-El), is about to return from his solar Fortress of Solitude after several centuries. As part of the festivities, the Justice Legion Alpha travels back in time to recruit the ancient Justice League of America. After arriving at the end of the 20th century, Kal Kent and the Justice Legion convince the League to go to the future and participate in trials as part of the celebration. Before they leave, Kal helps Superman stop a prison riot at Belle Reve; during this incident he references fighting the Chronovore with the Superman Squad.

Following the League's departure, Hourman releases the "Hourman virus" which infects not only people, but technology. It is revealed that the virus is an early version of Solaris' artificial intelligence. The virus is spreading because Solaris is looking in all technology and organisms for its body. To cure the world and save it from Solaris, the JL-Alpha has to create Solaris. Once in his body, Solaris becomes self-aware. Starman sacrifices himself to banish Solaris by creating a black hole. With the JL-Alpha's time machine unable to reach the 853rd century, Superman Secundus punches through the time barrier to bring the Legion back to the 853rd century. They arrive in time for Superman-Prime's arrival and the final destruction of Solaris.

=== All-Star Superman ===
Kal Kent in All Star Superman #2 (February 2006), art by Frank Quitely. This scene was later adapted into the 2011 animated film of the same name.

In All-Star Superman, Kal Kent is shown in a holographic communication unit as Superman is trying to communicate with the future. Due to technological limitations, only fragments come through. Kal appears leading the Superman Squad against the Chronovore in Smallville on the day Jonathan Kent dies of a heart attack.

== Powers and abilities ==
Kal Kent has Kryptonian powers that have evolved into the far future. His default Kryptonian powers (superhuman strength, invulnerability, superhuman speed, superhuman senses, ice breath, wind breath, flight, x-ray vision, and heat vision) appear on par with the vastly powerful Silver Age Superman. Due to other alien/extradimensional/supernatural admixtures in the Superman dynasty bloodline, he also has additional powers such as superhuman ESP, force vision, telepathy, electromagnetic manipulation, and an additional ten senses. Additionally, Kal possesses an advanced intelligence and is immune to kryptonite and red sun radiation, the traditional weaknesses of Kryptonians.

== In other media ==
Kal Kent makes a non-speaking cameo appearance in All-Star Superman.
