= Chris Sprouse =

American comics artist

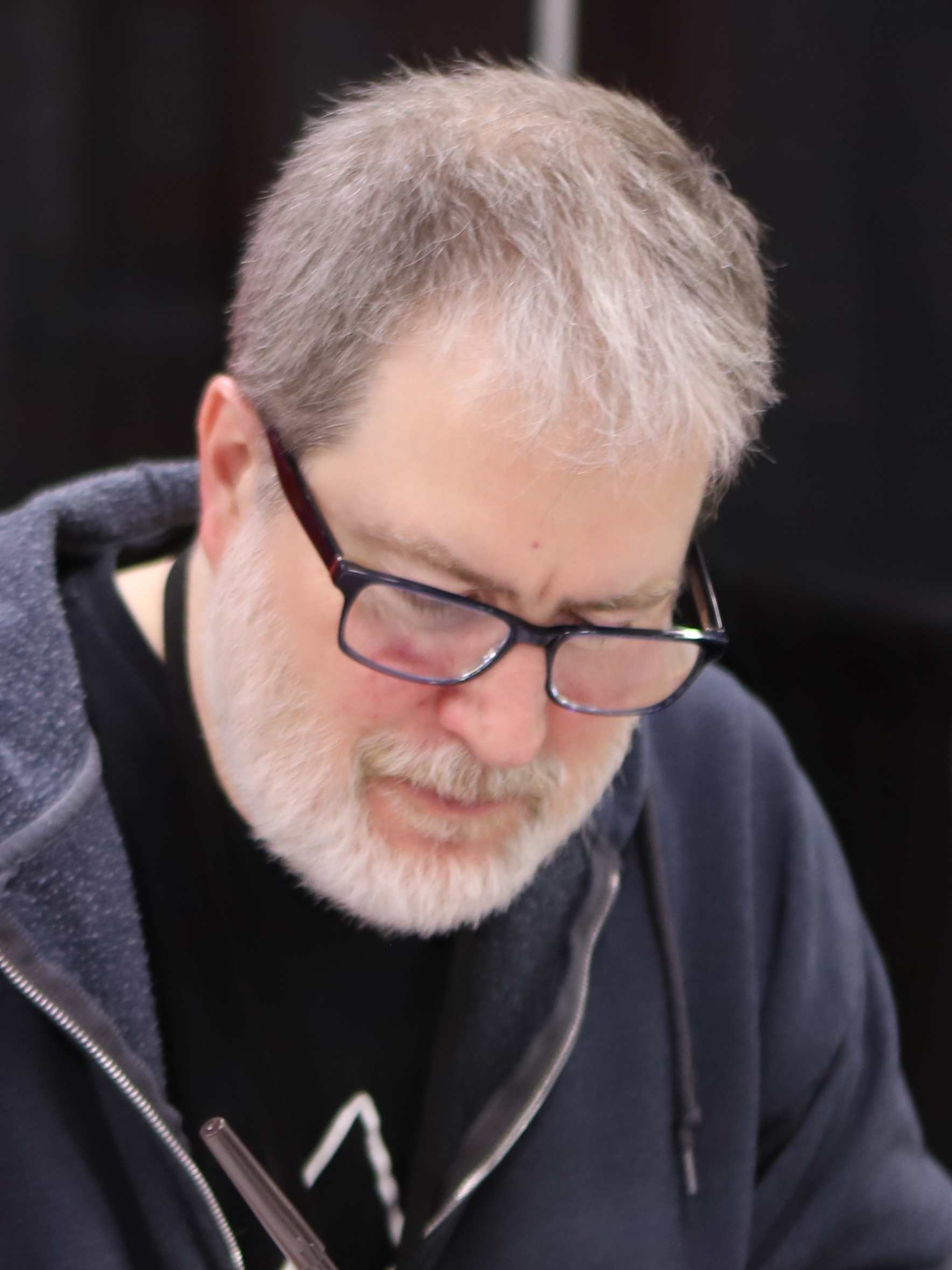
- Sprouse in 2023
- Born: July 30, 1966 (age 60) Charlottesville, Virginia, U.S.
- Area: Penciller
- Notable works: Tom Strong

Chris Sprouse (born July 30, 1966) is an American comics artist. Sprouse has worked for multiple publishers and has won two Eisner Awards for his work on Tom Strong, a series he created with writer Alan Moore.

== Early life ==
Chris Sprouse was born in Charlottesville, Virginia. At the age of 3 he moved with his family to New Delhi, India where he first discovered comics as he was unable to play outside due to the dangerous number of snakes in the house yard. When he was 6, his family returned to the United States to Dale City, Virginia, where he continued to read and draw comics. Before his debut in comics, Sprouse drew a comic strip entitled Ber-Mander for the school newspaper (The Hyphen) while attending Gar-Field Senior High School in Woodbridge. After graduating in 1984, Sprouse attended James Madison University where he studied graphic design.

== Career ==
Sprouse launched his career in mainstream comics in 1989, his first credited work being a Chemical King story in Secret Origins vol. 2 #47 (Feb. 1990). His next assignments were a Two-Face story for Batman Annual #14 (1990) and the Hammerlocke limited series. He drew insert posters for the War of the Gods limited series in 1991. Following that, Sprouse drew the Legionnaires series featuring teenaged versions of the Legion of Super-Heroes. He later illustrated a number of one-shots and fill-in issues before illustrating a Star Wars mini-series, Splinter of the Mind's Eye, for Dark Horse Comics.

He then worked for Extreme Studios as the regular penciller of New Men, and in 1997–1998, Sprouse drew several issues of Supreme, scripted by Alan Moore for the same publisher. After Supreme ended, he and Moore created Tom Strong for America's Best Comics, for which Sprouse won two Eisner Awards in 2000, for Best Single Issue and Best Serialized Story.

Sprouse was the penciller and co-creator on the 2004 Ocean mini-series, written by Warren Ellis and published by DC Comics. In 2007, Ocean was optioned for film. In 2006, he began pencilling Wildstorm's Midnighter ongoing series, a spin-off of The Authority. He was the artist on the first issue of Batman: The Return of Bruce Wayne with Grant Morrison as writer.

In 2011, Sprouse worked with writer Peter Hogan on the Tom Strong and the Planet of Peril limited series. Sprouse drew Action Comics #14 (Jan. 2013) which featured an "appearance" by Neil deGrasse Tyson. In 2014, Sprouse drew the second issue of Grant Morrison's The Multiversity limited series. Other works include Batman '66, Fairest: In All the Land, The Flash, Sensation Comics Featuring Wonder Woman, Agents of S.H.I.E.L.D., and Thors.

== Bibliography ==
=== Awesome Comics ===
- Alan Moore's Awesome Universe Handbook #1 (1999)
- Judgment Day Omega #2 (1997)
- Judgment Day: Sourcebook #1 (1997)
- Supreme #50, 52a, 52b, 53–56 (1997–1998)
- Supreme the Return #1 (1999)

=== Dark Horse Comics ===
- Star Wars: Splinter of the Mind's Eye #1–4 (1996)

=== DC Comics ===
- Action Comics vol. 2 #14–18 (2013)
- Batman Annual #14 (1990)
- Batman: Legends of the Dark Knight #27 (1992)
- Batman: Legends of the Dark Knight vol. 2 #10 (2013)
- Batman '66 #9 (2014)
- Batman: The Return of Bruce Wayne #1 (2010)
- Batman:Urban Legends #6 (2021)
- Hammerlocke #1–9 (1992–1993)
- Human Target #1, 3, 5 (2010)
- Justice League America Annual #5 (1991)
- Justice League Europe #13 (1990)
- Justice League Quarterly #1 (1990)
- Legion of Super-Heroes vol. 4 #8, 33, 41 (1990–1993)
- Legionnaires #1–6, 9–12 (1993–1994)
- The Multiversity: The Society of Super-Heroes: Conquerors of the Counter-World #1 (2014)
- Secret Origins vol. 2 #47 (1990)
- Spirit #7 (2007)
- Starman vol. 2 #14, 24 (1995–1996)
- Superman Red and Blue #5 (2021)
- Transmetropolitan: Filth of the City #1 (2001)
- Who's Who in the DC Universe #1, 3, 6, 8, 11–13, 16 (1990–1992)
- Who's Who in the DC Universe Update 1993 #1 (1992)

==== America's Best Comics ====
- ABC: A-Z, Tom Strong and Jack B. Quick #1 (2005)
- America's Best Comics Special #1 (2001)
- Many Worlds of Tesla Strong #1 (2003)
- Tom Strong #1–18, 23–24, 35–36 (1999–2006)
- Tom Strong and the Planet of Peril #1–6 (2013–2014)
- Tom Strong and the Robots of Doom #1–6 (2010–2011)

==== Wildstorm ====
- The Authority #11 (2009)
- Ex Machina Special #1–2 (2006)
- Global Frequency #8 (2003)
- Midnighter #1–3, 5, 10 (2007)
- Number of the Beast #1–8 (2008)
- Ocean #1–6 (2004–2005)
- WildC.A.T.s #11 (2009)

=== IDW Publishing ===
- Rocketeer Adventures #3 (2012)

=== Image Comics ===
- WildC.A.T.s/Aliens #1 (1998)

=== Malibu Comics ===
- Sludge #4 (1994)
- Ultraverse Origins #1 (1994)

=== Marvel Comics ===
- Battlezones: Dream Team 2 #1 (1996)
- Black Panther vol. 6 #5–8 (2016–2017)
- Captain America Annual #1 (2018)
- Dream Team #1 (1995)
- Fantastic Four Anniversary Tribute #1 (2022)
- Guardians of the Galaxy #3 (2020)
- Thors #1–4 (2015–2016)
- Uncanny X-Men #304 (1993)
