= Ocean (comics) =

- Cover of Ocean trade paperback.

Publication information
- Publisher: Wildstorm
- Format: Limited series
- Genre: Science fiction
- Publication date: December 2004 – September 2005
- No. of issues: 6

Creative team
- Created by: Warren Ellis
- Written by: Warren Ellis
- Penciller(s): Chris Sprouse
- Inker(s): Karl Story
- Letterer(s): Jared K. Fletcher
- Editor(s): Scott Dunbier

Collected editions
- Trade paperback: ISBN 1-4012-0849-5
- Deluxe Edition: ISBN 1-4012-5534-5

Ocean is a 2004 six-issue comic book miniseries, written by Warren Ellis with pencils by Chris Sprouse and inks by Karl Story. It was published by American company DC Comics under the Wildstorm imprint.

== Publication history ==
The series was originally intended to be a film script and then as a single graphic novel, leading to an absence of the traditional cliffhangers associated with monthly comics.

== Plot ==
Set in an era "one hundred years from now", Ocean is a science fiction story that tells the tale of Nathan Kane, a United Nations special weapons inspector, and his mission to Cold Harbor, a UN research station in orbit around Europa.

The Harbor's scientists have discovered a set of nonhuman artifacts in the ocean deep below the ice that covers the moon, and further research reveals that the artifacts are the powerful weapons, wormhole-based transport system, and cryogenic resting place of a conquering warlike race of prehuman beings.

This culture's home world was located between Mars and Jupiter, and in their ongoing civil war against each other, they wrought great damage on Mars, which used to be a far more temperate, colonized Earthlike planet before its atmosphere was destroyed in the same conflict that also utterly destroyed their home planet, its remains eventually becoming the asteroid belt. This last act was apparently a threshold event of some kind that caused the culture to lay down their arms, possibly out of shame or out of fear of some kind of reprisal. As a result, they put themselves and their technology in suspended animation deep within Europa's ocean. One of the Cold Harbor scientists suggests that this was motivated chiefly by their inability to live with themselves. However, before doing so, the culture seeded Earth with the genetic material that allowed human life to grow.

However, thanks to the unscrupulous acts of the insane manager of a weapons testing facility also in orbit around Europa, owned by an interplanetary corporation named Doors, the race starts to wake up, putting the Earth itself at risk from the resurgence of the extremely powerful and violent precursor race, and Nathan and the Harbor scientists are practically the only ones that can stop them.

== Collected editions ==
A trade paperback collection of the series was published by Wildstorm in 2005 (ISBN 1-4012-0849-5).

DC imprint Vertigo released a Deluxe Edition in 2015 that Ocean combined into one hardcover volume with Ellis' Orbiter, that was originally published by Vertigo (ISBN 1-4012-5534-5).

== Film ==
The comic has been optioned by Gianni Nunnari and Nick Wechsler who have history with films based on comics, the former produced 300 and the duo are slated to produce the film based on Ronin.

Ryan Condal, writer of the spec script Galahad, has been approached by Warner Brothers to produce a screenplay for them.

== See also ==
- Jupiter's moons in fiction#Europa
- Europa Report, a 2013 film about a crewed mission to Europa to look for life under the ice
