= Midnighter (2006 comic book) =

American comic book series

- Cover of Midnighter #1. Art by Chris Sprouse.

Publication information
- Publisher: WildStorm
- Schedule: Monthly
- Format: Ongoing series
- Genre: Superhero
- Publication date: November 2006 – June 2008
- No. of issues: 20

Creative team
- Created by: Warren Ellis; Bryan Hitch
- Editor(s): Scott Dunbier; Scott Peterson

Midnighter is an American comic book series published by WildStorm, first issued in November 2006. It is a spin-off from The Authority (which is itself a spin-off from Stormwatch), a superhero team comic book created by Warren Ellis and Bryan Hitch, and follows the solo adventures of Midnighter, "the greatest tactician in the history of mankind". The first six issues were written by Garth Ennis, followed by three issues made by different writers; the last eleven final issues were written by Keith Giffen. Midnighter ended with its twentieth issue, followed by the limited series Number of the Beast. The series is also known as Midnighter (Volume 1) to differentiate itself from the character's 12-issue latter series first published by DC Comics in 2015.

Three Midnighter trade paperbacks were originally released. In July 2017 the complete series was released for the first time in trade.

== Background ==
Midnighter was released in November 2006 as a part of the Wildstorm Universe "soft reboot" Worldstorm, which included the relaunch and debut of many titles under the label. It was originally intended as a six-issue miniseries written by Garth Ennis only, but later was expanded to be an ongoing series, with following issues penned by other writers. The book was officially announced at the Wizard World Los Angeles 2006 Comic Con, together with The Boys, another Ennis project originally for WildStorm.

== Conception and development ==
"I think the Midnighter is very much his own man; his sexuality is just one part of that. Never mind the fact that he doesn't kill people, would Batman do the things we’ve seen the Midnighter do? Batman fights for the status quo, the Midnighter fights to make the world better. Simple as that".

— Garth Ennis on Midnighter being seen as "the gay Batman".

Midnighter idea came when Ennis was having a lunch with other WildStorm people. Beside his A Man Called Kev and Battler Britton vanity projects, Wildstorm editor Scott Dunbier asked Ennis to also do something a bit more commercial in return, so the writer suggested to "go straight for the jugular and give the best character they’ve got his own book", which in his opinion would be Midnighter. Ennis described the character as "utterly lethal and he tells it like it is. He's got a nice dark sense of humor, too". About Midnighter's sexuality, the writer stated that "his sexuality is not a complex issue: he likes screwing men. He likes screwing one man in particular — but that doesn't mean he wants to be around the guy 24/7, hence the solo book". At Midnighter presentation, Ennis said that he could do more than six issues, something that didn't happen, and would try to maintain it as a solo book, without "any major appearances by The Authority in general" ("superteam, yawn"), "Apollo in particular" ("boring blond twat") or crossovers ("They can get someone else in for that").

Keith Giffen became the ongoing writer for Midnighter's last ten issues after a request from Dunbier, since Giffen previously expressed desire to write The Authority. According to Giffen, the idea was to keep Midnighter's consistency in characterization while adding his own different feel to it. He said Midnighter was an interesting character to him because he "never quite understood his power": "The idea of somebody who faces you down, and two seconds after meeting you, knows how to defeat you? That's kind of intriguing. Just playing around with that will be interesting". The writer expressed similar feelings to Ennis about keeping Midnighter on his own and "pull him back from The Authority", saying that he didn't want "that kind of feel that Midnighter is an extension of The Authority book". Giffen also added that he wished "to keep [writing Midnighter] until they throw me off the book".

== Story arcs ==
=== The Killing Machine (#1–5) ===
| # | Title | Publication date |
|---|---|---|
| 1 | "The Killing Machine (Part One)" | November 1, 2006 |
| 2 | "The Killing Machine (Part Two)" | December 6, 2006 |
| 3 | "The Killing Machine (Part Three)" | January 4, 2007 |
| 4 | "The Killing Machine (Part Four)" | February 7, 2007 |
| 5 | "The Killing Machine (Part Five)" | March 7, 2007 |

=== Single-issue stories (#6–9) ===
| # | Title | Publication date |
|---|---|---|
| 6 | "Flowers for the Sun" | April 4, 2007 |
| 7 | "Fait Accompli" | May 2, 2007 |
| 8 | "Ordinary People" | June 6, 2007 |
| 9 | "The Hercules Virus" | July 5, 2007 |

=== Anthem (#10–15) ===
| # | Title | Publication date |
|---|---|---|
| 10 | "Past Imperfect" | August 1, 2007 |
| 11 | "Anthem" | September 6, 2007 |
| 12 | "Foul Play" | October 3, 2007 |
| 13 | — | November 7, 2007 |
| 14 | "Life Choices" | December 5, 2007 |
| 15 | "Truth and Consequence" | January 4, 2008 |

=== Assassin8 (#16–20) ===
| # | Title | Publication date |
|---|---|---|
| 16 | "VIII" | February 6, 2008 |
| 17 | "Melee" | March 5, 2008 |
| 18 | "By the Numbers" | April 2, 2008 |
| 19 | "My Town" | May 7, 2008 |
| 20 | "There and Back Again" | June 4, 2008 |

== Critical reception ==
Midnighter received a weighted score of 7.9 out of 10 from review aggregate website Comic Book Roundup, indicating positive reviews, based on 8 reviews from comics critics. Reviewing the first issue, Comic Book Revolution's Rokk Krinn considered it a "well written and exciting read". He added: "Ennis delivers an intriguing character in Midnighter and a story that is full of some serious violence". Don MacPherson from Eye on Comics felt that "Ennis come through with a compelling script that demonstrates a real appreciation of the title character". He described the series as "a war comic", stating that this "makes this title book something that Ennis does better than most". Leroy Douresseaux from ComicBookBin also praised Ennis writing during his Midnighter #5 review, saying that "in his comics, life is precious, making it all the more appalling that so many lives come to such horrific endings". Douresseaux was positive about Midnighter's characterization too, stating that Ennis "works Midnighter with dark edgy humor as Warren Ellis did in the early days of the character".

Writing for Comics Bulletin, Bruce Logan complimented Midnighter #7 story: "The brilliance of Brian K. Vaughan's novel approach becomes evident when one reads it". About the series, Logan said that normally he "would object to so many changes in writers, but comic book titles don't normally have one excellent writer being replaced by another excellent writer(s)". Karman Kregloe of NewNowNext criticized Midnighter characterization, noting that "Ennis appeared uninterested in writing a gay character who happens to be living happily with another man and raising a teenage girl. [...] To reduce his being gay to a few jokes or jibes, as gay-friendly as they might be intended, shows a reluctance (or an inability) to write a believable gay character". He also added that, in the series, "homophobia seems to be shorthand for 'bad guy', but it reeks of laziness from the writers; [...] it's a selective acknowledgment of the hero's sexuality that reduces what could be a complex, vibrant gay character to a conflicted, inconsistent curiosity".

== Commercial performance ==
On Diamond Comic Distributors best-selling comics ranking for November 2006, Midnighter #1 debuted at number fifty-three with 39,794 copies distributed, being the top WildStorm comic issue of the month. Each Midnighter issue sold less than the previous, with the last one missing the 10,000 units mark in June 2008. The series' first trade volume, Killing Machine, had 2,440 units accounted in Diamond distributed comic shops during its release month, November 2007, placing at number forty-four on trade paperbacks chart. The following trade, Anthem, had 1,553 units accounted in August 2008 (Nº 67 on trade paperbacks chart), and the third and last one, Assassin8, had 1,159 in December of the same year (Nº 98 on trade paperbacks chart).

Midnighter: Physical sales per issue (in thousands)

The Killing Machine
| # | Sales | Average | Diamond ranking |
|---|---|---|---|
| 1 | 39,794 | 28,811 | 53 |
| 2 | 30,461 | 28,811 | 71 |
| 3 | 27,563 | 28,811 | 70 |
| 4 | 24,788 | 28,811 | 81 |
| 5 | 21,451 | 28,811 | 95 |

Single-issue stories
| # | Sales | Average | Diamond ranking |
|---|---|---|---|
| 6 | 20,540 | 18,790 | 101 |
| 7 | 19,904 | 18,790 | 114 |
| 8 | 18,065 | 18,790 | 108 |
| 9 | 16,650 | 18,790 | 128 |

Anthem
| # | Sales | Average | Diamond ranking |
|---|---|---|---|
| 10 | 15,653 | 13,498 | 143 |
| 11 | 14,344 | 13,498 | 137 |
| 12 | 13,727 | 13,498 | 162 |
| 13 | 12,991 | 13,498 | 166 |
| 14 | 12,351 | 13,498 | 155 |
| 15 | 11,919 | 13,498 | 152 |

Assassin8
| # | Sales | Average | Diamond ranking |
|---|---|---|---|
| 16 | 11,302 | 10,529 | 156 |
| 17 | 10,851 | 10,529 | 160 |
| 18 | 10,455 | 10,529 | 162 |
| 19 | 10,122 | 10,529 | 168 |
| 20 | 9,917 | 10,529 | 171 |

== Accolades ==
In 2008, Midnighter received a GLAAD Media Awards nomination for Outstanding Comic Book, but lost to Strangers in Paradise.

== Credits and personnel ==
Credits and personnel adapted from the series issues.

- Phil Balsman – letters (#1–2; #4–9)
- Pat Brosseau – letters (#11)
- Rick Burchett – inks (#13–17), artist (#18–20)
- ChrisCross – penciller (#11), inks (#11)
- Sal Cipriano – letters (#18)
- Saleem Crawford – inks (#3)
- Scott Dunbier – editor (#1–10; #12)
- Gabe Eltaeb – colors (#18–20)
- Garth Ennis – writer (#1–6)
- Glenn Fabry – artist (#6)
- Christos Gage – writer (#8)
- Lee Garbett – penciller (#16–17), cover (#16–20), artist (#18–20)
- Keith Giffen – writer (#10–20)
- Justin Gray – writer (#9)
- Troy Hubbs – inks (#11)
- Jon Landry – penciller (#13–15)
- Tarvis Lanham – letters (#10; #14)
- John Paul Leon – artist (#8)
- Randy Mayor – colors (#1–2; #4–12; #14; #16), cover (#10; #12; #14–20)
- Jimmy Palmiotti – writer (#9)
- Pete Pantazis – colors (#15)
- Scott Peterson – editor (#10–20)
- Joe Phillips – penciller (#3)
- Kristy Quinn – assistant editor (#1–20)
- Jonny Rench – colors (#6–7)
- Darick Robertson – penciller (#7)
- Jasen Rodriguez – inks (#3)
- Darlene Royer – colors (#12–14; #16)
- Rafael Sandoval – penciller (#12)
- Trevor Scott – cover (#16–20)
- Peter Snejbjerg – penciller (#4)
- Ray Snyder – inks (#5)
- Chris Sprouse – penciller (#1–3; #5; #10), cover (#1–15)
- Brian Stelfreeze – cover (#5–6; #13), artist (#9)
- Karl Story – inks (#1–5; #7; #10; #12), cover (#1–10; #12; #14–15)
- Brian K. Vaughan – writer (#7)
- Steve Wands – letters (#12–13; #15–17; #19–20)
- Wildstorm FX – letters (#3), colors (#3; #17)
- Scott Williams – inks (#3)

== Collected editions ==
The series has been collected into the following trade paperbacks:

| Title | Material collected | Publication date | ISBN |
|---|---|---|---|
| Midnighter: Killing Machine (Volume 1) | Midnighter #1–6 | November 28, 2007 | 978-1401214777 |
| Midnighter: Anthem (Volume 2) | Midnighter #7; #10–15 | August 20, 2008 | 978-1401216702 |
| Midnighter: Assassin8 (Volume 3) | Midnighter #16–20 | December 24, 2008 | 978-1401220013 |
| Midnighter: Hard | Midnighter #7–8 | October 19, 2016 | 978-1401264932 |
| Midnighter: The Complete Wildstorm Series | Midnighter #1–20 | July 12, 2017 | 978-1401267919 |

== See also ==
- Garth Ennis bibliography
