= Superman: The Man of Tomorrow =

1995–1999 superhero comic book series

- Cover of Superman: The Man of Tomorrow #1 (Summer 1995) by Tom Grummett and Brett Breeding.

Publication information
- Publisher: DC Comics
- Schedule: Quarterly
- Publication date: 1995–1999
- No. of issues: 16
- Main character: Superman

Creative team
- Written by: Roger Stern, #1–10; Louise Simonson, #11–14; J.M. DeMatteis, #15; Mark Schultz, #1,000,000
- Penciller(s): Tom Grummett, #1–5; Paul Ryan, #6–14; Ryan Sook, #15; Georges Jeanty, #1,000,000
- Inker(s): Brett Breeding, #1–11; Josef Rubinstein, #12; Dennis Janke, #13–14; Jeff Gan, #15; Denis Rodier, #1,000,000

Superman: The Man of Tomorrow (MOT) is a comic book series published by DC Comics that ran for 16 issues from 1995 to 1999, featuring the adventures of Superman. At the time, the four Superman titles (Action Comics, The Adventures of Superman, Superman, and Superman: The Man of Steel) were released weekly with an intertwining story. The Man of Tomorrow was created to fill the extra week in months with five weeks. At about this time, however, DC began its fifth week events, disrupting the schedule of The Man of Tomorrow, which was subsequently canceled with issue #15.

Issue #1,000,000 of the series was a part of the "DC One Million" storyline, which was a top vote-getter for the Comics Buyer's Guide Fan Award for Favorite Story for 1999.

== Key issues ==
- MOT #1: Return of Lex Luthor after being absent from the comics since Action Comics #701 (July 1994).
- MOT #5: Marriage of Luthor and Contessa Erica del Portenza.
- MOT #15: Day of Judgment cross-over. Superman has to rescue Lois Lane from Neron and Silver Banshee. Final issue.
