= Hammerlocke =

1992-93 DC Comics series by Tom Joyner and Kez Wilson

Publication information
- Publisher: DC Comics
- Schedule: Monthly
- Format: Limited series
- Publication date: September 1992 to May 1993
- No. of issues: 9

Creative team
- Created by: Tom Joyner, Chris Sprouse, Kez Wilson
- Written by: Tom Joyner, Kez Wilson
- Penciller: Chris Sprouse
- Inker: Kez Wilson

Hammerlocke is a 1992–1993 nine issue DC Comics science fiction limited series written by Tom Joyner and Kez Wilson, with artwork by Chris Sprouse and Wilson.

== Premise ==
In the near future, a space elevator called the Olympus Starbridge becomes the battleground between the world government and a radical environmentalist group. Its creator, the cyborg Archer Locke, known as Hammerlocke, is called out of retirement when his daughter is kidnapped by Hugo Tharn, leader of the ecoterrorists and a man determined to destroy the Olympus Starbridge and all it stands for.

== Collected editions ==
The series was scheduled for a 2009 re-release in a trade paperback format with additional material added by the creators but this never happened.
