= Karl Story =

- Born: 1967 (age 58–59)
- Area: Inker
- Notable works: Star Trek: Debt of Honor, Aliens versus Predator, Tom Strong

Karl Story (born 1967) is an American comic book artist specializing in inking. He is one of the original members of Atlanta's Gaijin Studios.

Over a career of more than three-and-a-half decades, he has worked on books such as Nightwing, Batman, Star Trek: Debt of Honor, Aliens versus Predator, X-Men, Wildstorm Summer Special, Terra Obscura, Tom Strong, Ocean, The American Way, and Midnighter, as well as many others.
