= DC One Million =

Crossover comic book storyline

- Cover of DC One Million (1999), trade paperback collected edition, art by Val Semeiks.
- Publisher: DC Comics
- Publication date: November 1998
- Genre: Science fiction, superhero; Crossover
Title(s)
DC One Million #1–4
Action Comics #1,000,000
Batman: Shadow of the Bat #1,000,000
Nightwing #1,000,000
Green Lantern #1,000,000
The Power of Shazam! #1,000,000
Young Justice #1,000,000
Batman #1,000,000
Superman: The Man of Steel #1,000,000
Starman #1,000,000
Impulse #1,000,000
Green Arrow #1,000,000
Legionnaires #1,000,000
Azrael #1,000,000
Superman (vol. 2) #1,000,000
Superboy #1,000,000
Detective Comics #1,000,000
JLA #1,000,000
Aquaman #1,000,000
Wonder Woman #1,000,000
Chase #1,000,000
Creeper #1,000,000
Martian Manhunter #1,000,000
Adventures of Superman #1,000,000
Resurrection Man #1,000,000
Catwoman #1,000,000
Robin #1,000,000
Flash #1,000,000
Supergirl #1,000,000
Superman: The Man of Tomorrow #1,000,000
Chronos #1,000,000
Young Heroes in Love #1,000,000
Lobo #1,000,000
Hitman #1,000,000
Legion of Super-Heroes #1,000,000
Booster Gold #1,000,000
- Main character(s): Justice League of America; Justice Legion Alpha; Solaris; Vandal Savage

Creative team
- Writer: Grant Morrison
- Penciller: Val Semeiks
- Inker(s): Prentis Rollins; Jeff Albrecht; Del Barras
- Colorist: Pat Garrahy (Heroic Age)
- DC One Million: ISBN 1-56389-525-0

"DC One Million" is a comic book crossover storyline which ran through an eponymous weekly miniseries and through special issues of almost all of the "DCU" titles published by DC Comics in November 1998. It featured a vision of the DC Universe in the 853rd century (85,201–85,300 AD), chosen because that is the century in which DC will have published issue #1,000,000 of Action Comics if it maintains a regular monthly publishing schedule. The miniseries was written by Grant Morrison and drawn by Val Semeiks.

== Set-up ==
The core of the event was a four-issue miniseries, in which the 20th-century Justice League of America and the 853rd-century Justice Legion Alpha cooperate to defeat a plot by the supervillain Vandal Savage (who, as an immortal, lives to the far flung century) and future Superman nemesis Solaris. Thirty-four other series then being published by DC also put out a single issue numbered #1,000,000, which either showed its characters' involvement in the central plot or gave a glimpse of what its characters' descendants/successors would be doing in the 853rd century. Hitman #1,000,000 was essentially a parody of the entire storyline. A trade paperback collection was subsequently published consisting of the four-issue mini-series and the tie-in issues that were necessary to follow the main plot. The series was then followed by a one-shot issue titled DC One Million 80-Page Giant #1,000,000 (1999), which was a collection of further adventures in the life of the future heroes.

== Plot ==
In the 853rd century, the original Superman ("Superman-Prime One Million") still lives, but has spent over 15,000 years in exile within his Fortress of Solitude, located at the heart of the Sun, to keep it alive. During this time of absence, everyone he knew and loved died. One of his descendants is Kal Kent, the Superman of the 853rd century.

The galaxy in the far future is protected by the Justice Legions, which were inspired by the 20th-century Justice League and the 31st-century Legion of Super-Heroes, among others. Justice Legion Alpha, which protects the Solar System, includes Kal Kent and future analogues of Wonder Woman, Hourman, Starman, Aquaman, the Flash, and Batman. Advanced terraforming processes have made all the Solar System's planets habitable, with the ones most distant from the Sun being warmed by Solaris, a "star computer" which was once a villain, but was reprogrammed by one of Superman's descendants.

Superman-Prime announces that he will soon return to humanity and, to celebrate, Justice Legion Alpha travels to the late 20th century to meet Superman's original teammates in the JLA and bring them and Superman to the future.

Meanwhile, in Russia, Vandal Savage single-handedly defeats the Titans (Arsenal, Tempest, Jesse Quick and Supergirl) when they attempt to stop him from purchasing nuclear-powered Rocket Red suits. He then launches four Rocket Red suits (with a Titan trapped inside each of the four) in a nuclear strike on Washington D.C., Metropolis, Brussels, and Singapore.

Starman is bribed into betraying his teammates by Solaris, which has returned to its old habits. Before the original heroes can be returned to their own time, the Hourman android collapses and releases a virus programmed by Solaris. The virus affects the guidance systems of the Rocket Red suits and causes one of them to detonate over Montevideo, killing more than one million people. Tempest escapes, but blacks out and falls into the sea. Believing that this was deliberately planned by the JLA to stop him, Savage launches an all-out war on superhumans.

The two JLAs stop after discovering that it is a complex computer program looking for appropriate hardware. To provide this hardware, the heroes are forced to build the body of Solaris in the present day. In a final act of repentance, Starman sacrifices himself to banish Solaris from the Solar System. The future Superman forces himself through time using confiscated time travel technology.

Solaris, in a final attack, slaughters thousands of superhumans so that it can fire kryptonite into the sun and kill Superman-Prime before he emerges. The JLA's Green Lantern causes Solaris to go supernova and he and the 853rd century Superman contain the resulting blast, but not before the kryptonite is released.

The future Vandal Savage teleports from Mars to Earth using the stolen Time-Gauntlets. However, Chronos and Resurrection Man (an immortal who had become Savage's greatest foe through the millennia) have sabotaged the Gauntlets so that Savage, instead of travelling only in space, also travels through time. He arrives in Montevideo moments before the nuclear blast, which kills him.

In the aftermath, the original Superman and the future Hourman use the DNA sample to recreate Lois Lane, giving her superpowers. Superman then also recreates Krypton, along with all its deceased inhabitants, in Earth's Solar system.

== Crossovers ==
Alongside the main DC One Million miniseries and the accompanying 80-Page Giant issue, the following ongoing DC Comics books also partook in the event:

- Action Comics
- Adventures of Superman
- Aquaman (vol. 6)
- Azrael
- Batman
- Batman: Shadow of the Bat
- Booster Gold
- Catwoman (vol. 2)
- Chase
- Chronos
- Creeper
- Detective Comics
- Flash (vol. 2)
- Green Arrow
- Green Lantern (vol. 3)
- Hitman
- Hourman
- Impulse
- JLA
- Legion of Super-Heroes (vol. 4)
- Legionnaires
- Lobo (vol. 2)
- Martian Manhunter (vol. 2)
- Nightwing (vol. 2)
- The Power of Shazam!
- Resurrection Man
- Robin (vol. 2)
- Starman (vol. 2)
- Superboy (vol. 4)
- Supergirl (vol. 4)
- Superman (vol. 2)
- Superman: The Man of Steel
- Superman: The Man of Tomorrow
- Wonder Woman (vol. 2)
- Young Heroes in Love
- Young Justice

== The Justice Legions ==
There are 24 Justice Legions, each based on 20th- and 30th-century superhero teams. Those featured include:

- Justice Legion A is based on the Justice League.
- Justice Legion B is based on the Titans. Members include Nightwing (a bat-like humanoid), Aqualad (a humanoid made from water), Troy (a younger version of the 853rd century Wonder Woman), Arsenal (a robot), and Joto (killed in a teleporter accident).
- Justice Legion L is based on the Legion of Super-Heroes and protects an artificially created planetary system (all that remains of the United Planets). Members include Cosmicbot (a cyborg based on magnetism, modelled on Cosmic Boy), Titangirl (the combined psychic energy of all Titanians, based on Saturn Girl), Implicate Girl (who contains the abilities of all three trillion Carggites in her "third eye", loosely based on Triplicate Girl), Brainiac 417 (a disembodied intelligence, based on Brainiac 5 and Apparition), the M'onelves (who combine the powers of M'onel and Shrinking Violet) and humanoid versions of Umbra and Chameleon.
- Justice Legion S consists of numerous Superboy clones, all with different powers. Members include Superboy 820 (with aquatic powers), Superboy 3541 (who can increase his size) and Superboy One Million (who can channel any of their powers through "the Eye"). They all (most notably One Million) resemble OMAC as much as Superboy. This was an intentional pun, as the title of the story was "One Million And Counting", which referred to the 1 million clones and formed the OMAC acronym.
- Justice Legion T is based on Young Justice. Members include Superboy One Million (as referred to above), Robin the Toy Wonder (an optimistic robot sidekick to the 853rd century Batman) and Impulse (the living embodiment of random thoughts lost in the Speed Force).
- Justice Legion Z (for Zoomorphs) is based on the Legion of Super-Pets. Members include Proty One Million and Master Mind. A version of Comet is also a member.

== Other characters ==
Several other futuristic versions of DC characters appeared in the crossover, including:

- Atom
- Azrael
- Booster Gold
- Captain Marvel
- Catwoman
- Charade City
- Gunfire
- Lex Luthor
- Supergirl

== Later references ==
In 2008, 10 years after the crossover, an issue of Booster Gold (vol. 2) was published as Booster Gold #1,000,000 and was announced as an official DC One Million tie-in by DC Comics. This comic introduced Peter Platinum, the Booster Gold of the 853rd century.

Grant Morrison's All-Star Superman miniseries made several references to the DC One Million miniseries. The Superman from DC One Million makes an appearance and the series ends with Superman becoming an energy being who resides in the Sun after his body has been supercharged with yellow solar energy (similar in appearance to Superman-Prime) and Solaris makes an appearance as well.

Morrison's Batman #700 also briefly shows the One Million Batman and his sidekick—Robin, the Toy Wonder—alongside a number of future iterations of Batman.

The One Million Batman, Robin the Toy Wonder and One Million Superman play a significant role in Superman/Batman #79–80, in which Epoch battles Batmen and Supermen from various time periods.

== In other media ==
The DC One Million incarnation of Batman appears as an unlockable costume in Batman: Arkham Origins.

== Awards ==
The original miniseries was a top vote-getter for the Comics Buyer's Guide Fan Award for Favorite Limited Series for 1999. The storyline was a top vote-getter for the Comics Buyer's Guide Award for Favorite Story for 1999.

== Collected editions ==
- DC One Million, later reprinted with the title JLA: One Million (208 pages, DC Comics, June 1999, ISBN 1-56389-525-0, Titan Books, June 1999, ISBN 1-84023-094-0, DC Comics, June 2004, ISBN 1-4012-0320-5) collects:
  - DC One Million (by Grant Morrison, with pencils by Val Semeiks and inks by Prentis Rollins/Jeff Albrecht/Del Barras, four-issue miniseries)
  - Green Lantern #1,000,000 (by Ron Marz, with pencils by Bryan Hitch and inks by Andy Lanning/Paul Neary)
  - Resurrection Man #1,000,000 (by Dan Abnett and Andy Lanning, with art by Jackson Guice)
  - Starman #1,000,000 (by James Robinson, with pencils by Peter Snejbjerg and inks by Wade Von Grawbadger)
  - JLA #1,000,000 (by Grant Morrison, with pencils by Howard Porter and inks by John Dell)
  - Superman: The Man of Tomorrow #1,000,000 (by Mark Schultz, with pencils by Georges Jeanty and inks by Dennis Janke/Denis Rodier)
  - Detective Comics #1,000,000 (by Chuck Dixon, with pencils by Greg Land and inks by Drew Geraci)
- DC One Million Omnibus (1,080 pages, DC Comics, October 2013, ISBN 978-1-4012-4243-5) collects:
  - DC One Million #1–4, plus the #1,000,000 issues of Action Comics, Adventures Of Superman, Aquaman, Azrael, Batman, Batman: Shadow Of The Bat, Catwoman, Chase, Chronos, The Creeper, Detective Comics, The Flash, Green Arrow, Green Lantern, Hitman, Impulse, JLA, Legion of Super-Heroes, Legionnaires, Lobo, Martian Manhunter, Nightwing, Power Of Shazam, Resurrection Man, Robin, Starman, Superboy, Supergirl, Superman (vol. 2), Superman: The Man of Steel, Superman: The Man of Tomorrow, Wonder Woman and Young Justice; as well as Booster Gold #1,000,000, DC One Million 80-Page Giant #1 and Superman/Batman #79–80 (the Omnibus did not include the #1,000,000 issue of Young Heroes in Love, as it was a creator-owned series).
