= All-Star Superman =

2005–2008 DC Comics miniseries featuring Superman

- Cover of All-Star Superman #1

Publication information
- Publisher: DC Comics
- Schedule: Bimonthly
- Format: Ongoing series
- Genre: Superhero
- Publication date: November 2005 – October 2008
- No. of issues: 12
- Main character(s): Superman; Lex Luthor; Lois Lane

Creative team
- Created by: Grant Morrison; Frank Quitely
- Written by: Grant Morrison
- Penciller: Frank Quitely
- Inker: Jamie Grant
- Letterer(s): Phil Balsman; Travis Lanham
- Colorist: Jamie Grant
- Editor(s): Brandon Montclare; Bob Schreck

Collected editions
- Volume 1: ISBN 1401209149
- Volume 2: ISBN 1401218377
- Absolute Edition: ISBN 1401229174
- Deluxe Edition: ISBN 1779513445
- Compact Edition: ISBN 177952725X

All-Star Superman is a twelve-issue American comic book series featuring Superman that was published by DC Comics. The series ran from November 2005 to October 2008, written by Grant Morrison, drawn by Frank Quitely, and digitally inked by Jamie Grant. The series revolves around Superman as he accomplishes many heroic feats (The Twelve Labors of Superman) and attempts to make peace with the world before his imminent death due to overexposure to Earth's Sun.

The origin of the series started with Morrison's desire to tell a "timeless" Superman story that was not an origin story or followed a classic narrative. Morrison originally planned a revamp of the Superman character, titled "Superman Now", but after the approach was declined, they decided they would not write anything related to Superman until DC Vice President Dan DiDio contacted them. Some of the ideas planned for "Superman Now" were subsequently reused for All-Star Superman.

The series was the second to be launched in 2005 under DC's All-Star imprint, the first being All Star Batman & Robin, the Boy Wonder. These series were attempts by DC to allow major comics creators a chance to tell stories showcasing these characters without being restricted by DC Universe continuity.

All-Star Superman received critical acclaim for its emotional story, characterization, writing, and artwork. It is now widely seen as one of the greatest Superman stories ever written and one of the best comic books of all time. An animated adaptation was released in 2011, and the 2025 film Superman takes inspiration from the comic book series.

== Publication history ==
Grant Morrison's approach to writing this series was to make the reading as universal as possible. He stated that they were not interested in "re-doing origin stories or unpacking classic narratives" but instead wanted to do "a total update, rehaul and refit". Instead creating a "fresh and relevant" update for new readers, Morrison wanted to write a "collection of 'timeless' Superman issues". The origins of this lie in a revamp of Superman, Superman Now, which began when Morrison and editor Dan Raspler were unsuccessfully brainstorming ideas for a new take on the character outside San Diego Comic-Con, when they had a "shamanic" encounter with a man dressed as Superman which helped spark the creative process and inspired the cover to the first issue. Morrison states in an interview:

He was perched with one knee drawn up, chin resting on his arms. He looked totally relaxed... and I suddenly realized this was how Superman would sit. He wouldn't puff out his chest or posture heroically, he would be totally chilled. If nothing can hurt you, you can afford to be cool. A man like Superman would never have to tense against the cold; never have to flinch in the face of a blow. He would be completely laid back, un-tense. With this image of Superman relaxing on a cloud looking out for us all in my head, I rushed back to my hotel room and filled dozens of pages of my notebook with notes and drawings.

The ideas generated by that meeting were refined and pitched to DC in 1998 by Morrison, Mark Millar, Mark Waid and Tom Peyer. They picked up on the fifteen-year cycle of reboots to the character, the previous one being John Byrne's The Man of Steel, and suggested a new approach:

The Superman relaunch we're selling bucks the trend of sweeping aside the work done by those who came immediately before. Unlike the 'cosmic reset' revamps all too prevalent in current comics, our new Superman approach is an honest attempt to synthesize the best of all previous eras. Our intention is to honor each of Superman's various interpretations and to use internal story logic as our launching pad for a re-imagined, streamlined 21st century Man of Steel. The 'cosmic reset' notion has been replaced by a policy of 'include and transcend' with regard to past continuity. Our intention is to restore Superman to his pre-eminent place as the greatest super-hero of all.

Although initially greenlit, it was eventually turned down and Morrison said that they "didn't expect to be doing any further work on Superman" but the chance came as they were finishing their run on New X-Men. In an interview with Matt Brady from Newsarama, Grant Morrison said that they were contacted by DC Vice President Dan DiDio and asked "if I'd like to come back to DC to work on a Superman project with an artist of my choice". They mentioned it worked out well since they were also planning to return to DC "to do the Seven Soldiers project and the Vertigo books".

Morrison has confirmed that they made use of some of their Superman Now ideas for All-Star Superman, like "Luthor's heart-stopping moment of understanding", as well as drawing on their original proposal for elements later included in the "DC One Million" storyline.

In writing the character Superman, Morrison identifies different aspects of his personality: "'Superman' is an act. 'Clark Kent' in Metropolis is also an act. There are actually two Kents, at least – one is a disguise, a bumbling, awkward mask for Superman. The other is the confident, strong, good-hearted Clark Kent who was raised by his surrogate Ma and Pa in Kansas and knows how to drive a tractor. I think he's the most 'real' of all".

Artist Frank Quitely devised the visual style to present Superman as a "deity" and contrast Clark Kent's appearance as "if Will Eisner had drawn Superman in the 1940s", allowing him to "release his posture so that his shoulders slumped, his spine curved, and his belly stuck out".

As the series drew to a close, writer Grant Morrison conceived of a series of one-shot specials, loose in continuity from the original series, that would depict or pay tribute to the Golden Age Superman, the Super-Sons World's Finest Comics team, the Superman Squad, the Superman of the 853rd Century, and the Superman dynasty. Publisher Dan DiDio stated at the time that there were no plans for the specials. Morrison would later become involved as writer on a 2011 relaunch of Action Comics where they used their ideas about the Golden Age Superman.

== Plot ==
Superman on the cover of All-Star Superman #10 (May 2008); artwork by Frank Quitely.

Superman rescues Dr. Leo Quintum and his P.R.O.J.E.C.T. team from an exploration mission to the Sun that was remotely sabotaged by Lex Luthor, and acquires the ability to project his bio-electric aura. Luthor orchestrated this event to overwhelm Superman's cells with massive amounts of solar radiation, which greatly increases his power but is also killing him, with Quintum giving him one year left to live. Luthor is arrested after the publication of a Daily Planet article written by Clark Kent, while Superman decides to keep his impending death secret from the public.

Nonetheless, Superman reveals his secret identity to Lois Lane to spend his remaining time with her. Although Lois initially refuses to believe this, Superman treats her to a birthday dinner in the Fortress of Solitude. Superman's furtive behavior and an airborne chemical in the raised and restored Titanic rouses paranoia in Lois and she accidentally attacks Superman with a Kryptonite laser, but he is unharmed by it due to his new powers. Superman calms her down and reveals that he had been preparing her birthday present: a liquefied form of his DNA that will grant her all his superpowers for 24 hours, as well as a leotard costume. Using the name "Superwoman", she joins Superman as he stops a monster attack in Metropolis involving Samson, Atlas and an Ultra-Sphinx. Superman drives Samson and Atlas away and he and Lois spend an eventful day that ends with them kissing on the moon before her powers fade and she falls asleep. Superman flies her back home. Meanwhile, Luthor is convicted of crimes against humanity and sentenced to death. Clark meets with Luthor for an interview at Stryker's Island. Following a violent encounter with the Parasite in which Clark manages to conceal his identity, Luthor reveals that he respects Clark as a journalist and that he has no desire to escape because he has fulfilled his dream of killing Superman.

Nearing death, Superman accomplishes the "Twelve Labors of Superman" – a variety of tasks that significantly help both humans and Kryptonians – and completes his last will and testament. Meanwhile, Luthor survives and escapes his execution after taking a formula similar to what Superman made for Lois, and he begins razing Metropolis with the aid of Solaris, an artificial star that corrupts the Sun and turns it red. After Superman defeats Solaris, Clark returns to the Daily Planet to submit his article, but falls dead. As the staff tries to save him, Superman awakes on his home planet of Krypton and meets his father Jor-El, who reveals that Superman's body is converting itself to a solar radio-consciousness. He offers him a choice; remain dead or return to life long enough to defeat Luthor. Clark wakes up, and confronts Luthor, firing a gravity gun at him. The gravity gun warps time for Luthor, speeding up the exhaustion of his powers. As his powers fade, Luthor briefly sees Superman's vision of Earth, and weeps before Superman knocks him out. Superman proclaims his eternal love for Lois and kisses her before becoming a solar consciousness and repairing the Sun.

One year later, Lois admires a monument dedicated to Superman and tells Jimmy Olsen that she believes Superman will return if he can create an artificial heart for the Sun. Superman, now a solar being, lives inside the Sun and maintains machinery to keep it alive. Meanwhile, Quintum reveals a new P.R.O.J.E.C.T in case something happens, and unveils it by standing before a door with Superman's characteristic emblem, with its usual "S" replaced with the number "2".

== Reception ==
=== Sales ===
The first issue was released in November 2005 and was a sales success, ranking second in the top 300 comics for that period, with Infinite Crisis #2 being the top seller. The second issue also ranked second in the top 300 comics for the January 2006 period, with pre-order sales of 124,328; Infinite Crisis #4 was the top seller that month. The series completed its run upon publication of its final issue in October 2008.

=== Critical response ===
Jeremy Estes, an early reviewer from PopMatters, notes the difficulty in revamping the character Superman in his review of the first issue of the series. The All-Star continuity allowed the writer Grant Morrison much more writing freedom. Frank Quitely's art is praised as "fresh and modern", while still "evoking the classic hero known around the world". At the time of writing only the first issue had been released, and so Estes was unsure of the direction of the story, noting the creative team "have set up a promising tale, but only time will tell if they take the last train to Memphis or head West, all the way to Vegas". Nicholas Labarre, writing for Sequart, argued that All-Star Superman "confidently exploits the near omnipotence of the main character" in contrast with other Superman stories. He compared the series favorably with Morrison's other work. Ed Mathews from PopImage reviewed the first collected trade paperback, which collects the first six issues, and praised the creative team, stating the art is "the most elegant work out of Frank Quitely I've seen to date". Mathews also singled out Grant Morrison's, saying that the series adds to the Superman mythos "by tweaking bits and parts from the character's rich history just enough to make old concepts fresh again". He recommended Volume 1 of the collected editions, and stated that "All Star Superman sings a hit". Another review of Volume 1 came from Danny Graydon of The First Post, who stated that Grant Morrison's writing is "the most vigorously entertaining take on the 'Man of Steel' in decades" and that the "nuanced artwork is to be savoured".

Time magazine's Lev Grossman ranked the graphic novel third in Top 10 Graphic Novels of 2007. He praised the storyline, noting that due to the character's strength and morality, he is a difficult character to write for. IGN's list of top 25 Superman stories ranked All-Star Superman as number one, describing it as "a loving and affectionate celebration of everything that Superman stands for". The pop culture commentator Comic Book Girl 19 praised the series suggesting that Grant Morrison had portrayed Superman as "emotionally intelligent, thoughtful" and "compassionate".

=== Awards ===
All-Star Superman won the Eisner Award for "Best New Series" in 2006, as well as "Best Continuing Series" in 2007 and 2009. It also won the Harvey Awards for "Best Artist" and "Best Single Issue" in 2008. In 2006 it won the Eagle Award for "Favourite New Comic book" and "Favourite Comics Cover" (for the first issue), as well as the 2007 "Favourite Colour Comicbook - American" Eagle.

== In other media ==
=== Television ===
- The 2017 Arrowverse crossover "Crisis on Earth-X" loosely incorporates several elements from All-Star Superman; the Nazi Supergirl is shown to be suffering from the same condition Superman is in the comic, and her cells are mentioned to be overloaded with solar radiation. When asked about this, she says "like Icarus, I flew too close to the sun", further referencing the events of the comic.
- The third season of My Adventures with Superman incorporates several elements from All-Star Superman; the Fortress of Solitude now has several caped-robot servants, and the Subterranosauri led by Tyrannko, initially an enemy-later-ally of the Super-family.

=== Film ===
- All-Star Superman, a film in the DC Universe Animated Original Movies series, is an adaptation of Grant Morrison and Frank Quitely's comic book. It was written by writer Dwayne McDuffie and directed by Sam Liu. It was released on February 22, 2011. It stars James Denton as Superman, Christina Hendricks as Lois Lane, Anthony LaPaglia as Lex Luthor, Edward Asner as Perry White, Obba Babatundé as Judge, Steven Blum as Atlas, Linda Cardellini as Nasthalthia "Nasty" Luthor, Frances Conroy as Martha Kent, Alexis Denisof as Dr. Leo Quintum, Michael Gough as Parasite, Matthew Gray Gubler as Jimmy Olsen, Finola Hughes as Lilo, Kevin Michael Richardson as Steve Lombard, and Arnold Vosloo as Bar-El.
- The 2013 film Man of Steel features a monologue spoken by Jor-El (Russell Crowe) taken almost word-for-word from the comic.
- The 2025 film Superman takes inspiration from All-Star Superman.

=== Miscellaneous ===
A full-cast audio dramatisation from DC and Penguin Random House Audio was released in June 2025. The cast includes Marc Thompson as Superman, Kristen Sieh as Lois Lane, and Christopher Smith as Lex Luthor.

== Collected editions ==
The series has been collected into following formats:

=== English version by DC Comics ===
- All-Star Superman Volume 1 (collects #1–6, 160 pages)

- hardcover edition (ISBN 1-84576326-2, January 2007)
- hardcover edition (ISBN 1-4012-0914-9/978-1-4012-0914-8, 2007-04-11)
- softcover edition (ISBN 1-4012-1102-X/978-1-4012-1102-8, 2008-08-27)

- All-Star Superman Volume 2 (collects #7–12, 160 pages)

- hardcover edition (ISBN 1-4012-1837-7/978-1-4012-1837-9, 2009-02-11)
- DC softcover edition (ISBN 1-4012-1860-1/978-1-4012-1860-7, 2010-02-10)
- Titan softcover edition, September 2009, ISBN 1-84576859-0

- Absolute All-Star Superman (collects #1–12, bonus sketchbook section, 320 pages)

- 1st print (ISBN 1-4012-2917-4?, 2010-11-03)
- 2nd print (ISBN 1-4012-2917-4/978-1-4012-2917-7, 2011-10-26)

- All-Star Superman (collects #1–12, 304 pages)

- DC softcover edition (ISBN 1-4012-3205-1/978-1-4012-3205-4, 2011-10-05)
- DC Black Label softcover edition (ISBN 1-4012-9083-3/978-1-4012-9083-2, 2018-11-28)

- All-Star Superman: The Deluxe Edition (collects #1–12, extras, 328 pages)

- hardcover edition (ISBN 1-77951-344-5/978-1-77951-344-1, 2022-01-25)

- All-Star Superman: DC Compact Comics Edition (collects #1-12, 296 pages)

- softcover edition (ISBN 978-1-77952-725-7, 2024-07-02)

=== Dutch/Flemish version by Lion ===
- Absolute All-Star Superman (collects #1–12, bonus sketchbook section, 320 pages)

- 2nd print (ISBN 886691563-7/978-886691563-8, 2013-07-01?)

=== Spanish version by ECC Cómics ===
- All-Star Superman Parte 1 (collects #1–6)

- DC edition (ISBN 978-84-16998-91-3, 2017-04-01?)

- All-Star Superman Parte 2 (collects #7–12)

- DC edition (ISBN 978-84-16998-95-1, 2017-04-01?)

- All-Star Superman (collects #1–12)

- quarter edition (ISBN 978-84-17401-94-8, 2018-04-10)
- DC Black Label edition (ISBN 978-84-18326-78-3, 2020-10-06)
- Deluxe Edition (ISBN 978-84-17871-21-5, 2019-06-04)

=== Finnish version by Egmont ===
- Teräsmies (collects #1–12, 294 pages)

- 1st print (ISBN 978-952233594-4, 2012)
