= Tom Joyner (writer) =

American comics writer

Tom Joyner is a writer and academic.

Joyner received his B.A. in English from Rollins College and his M.A. and Ph.D. (both in Theater) from the University of Colorado Boulder. His research foci included 20th Century Irish drama, post-colonial theaters, and theaters of social justice.

He has worked as a performer, dramaturg, educational outreach writer, and director with university, community, and professional theaters in Florida and Colorado and was part of the inaugural class for Naropa University's Actor-created Physical Theater program.

Prior to graduate school, while working as a freelance writer, Joyner co-created and wrote several titles for DC Comics including Hammerlocke, Scarlett, and Damage. His first published comics work was an Amazons feature which appeared as a DC Comics Bonus Book in Wonder Woman vol. 2 #26 (January 1989). Joyner also wrote individual issues of several other titles including Doctor Fate, Batman: Legends of the Dark Knight, Deathstroke, and Secret Origins.

== Bibliography ==
=== DC Comics ===
- Batman: Legends of the Dark Knight #41 (1993)
- Damage #1–20, #0 (1994–1996)
- Deathstroke #53–54 (1995)
- Doctor Fate #38 (1992)
- Hammerlocke #1–9 (1992–1993)
- Scarlett #1–14 (1993–1994)
- Secret Origins #40 (1989) (Congorilla)
- Titans Secret Files and Origins #1 (1999)
- Who's Who in the DC Universe #6 (1991)
- Wonder Woman vol. 2 #26 (Amazons)

=== Image Comics ===
- Deathblow #21–29 (1995–1996)
