= Val Semeiks =

- Born: Valdis Semeiks; February 5, 1955 (age 71)
- Areas: Penciller, inker
- Notable works: Conan the Barbarian; The Demon; Lobo; DC One Million

Valdis "Val" Semeiks (/ˈsɛmɪks/; born 5 February 1955) is an American comic book artist who has mostly worked for DC Comics and Marvel Comics.

== Biography ==
Val Semeiks was born in the U.S. to Latvian parents.

Semeiks graduated from college with degrees in chemistry and mathematics, before pursuing a career in advertising, working as "an art director for a regional ad agency". He has been working in the comics field since 1986, mostly as a penciller although he has been known to ink his own work. His first professional credit was with Marvel, drawing King Kull back-up stories for The Savage Sword of Conan, which ultimately led to him becoming the monthly artist on Conan the Barbarian, allowing him to leave his day job and forge a fulltime career as a comics artist.

His following credits include long runs on The Demon and Lobo for DC Comics; he primarily worked with writer Alan Grant, whose plots Semeiks defined "laugh-out-loud funny", leading him to call his time on Lobo (upon which he worked with inker John Dell) "about as much fun as anyone can have drawing comics". He also provided the artwork to Alan Grant and John Wagner's 1995 DC/2000 AD crossover title Lobo/Judge Dredd: Psycho-Bikers vs. The Mutants From Hell. When, as part of the 1996 DC vs. Marvel event, the DC and Marvel Universes briefly combined to form the Amalgam Universe, Alan Grant and Semeiks produced the Oneshot "Lobo the Duck".

Returning briefly to Marvel, Semeiks was reunited with his first editor Larry Hama, working with him on Wolverine, alongside a number of other titles. Returning again to DC, Semeiks worked on a number of JLA projects with then-JLA-writer Grant Morrison, including JLA/WildC.A.T.S., DC One Million, and the 1999 limited series Superman's Nemesis: Lex Luthor with writer David Michelinie. Semeiks drew two Batman stories penned by Dwayne McDuffie in 2002 and 2003 for Batman: Legends of the Dark Knight (issues #156-158) and (issues #164-167). In 2006, he helped wrap up the second volume of Flash, illustrating issues #227-230. He contributed to Marvel's relaunch of Web of Spider-Man in 2009.

He has also worked on non-Superhero projects including cartoon work for MAD Magazine and DC's "Big Book" series (from Paradox Press) as well as "video game and toy design work too". He illustrated fantasy author R.A. Salvatore's Icewind Dale Trilogy in three comicbook mini-series (Crystal Shard, Streams of Silver, and Halfling's Gem).
