= Solaris (DC Comics) =

- Solaris as depicted in DC One Million #3 (September 1998). Art by Val Semeiks.

Publication information
- Publisher: DC Comics
- First appearance: DC One Million #1 (1998)
- Created by: Grant Morrison

In-story information
- Alter ego: Solaris
- Species: Sentient artificial star
- Team affiliations: Superman dynasty Pancosmic Justice Jihad
- Abilities: Artificial intelligence Solar radiation manipulation

Solaris (also known as Solaris the Tyrant Sun) is a DC Comics supervillain who exists in the distant future of the DC Universe. He was created by Grant Morrison, and first appeared in the 1998 event storyline DC One Million.

== Fictional character biography ==
In the 853rd century, Solaris is a secondary artificial sun, a sentient machine in the orbit of Uranus that helps to warm the outer parts of the Solar System and relay communications and information. His caretaker is the future Starman (Farris Knight).

Solaris is created in the 20th-century section of the DC One Million storyline in a predestination paradox, as his abilities are required to counteract an organic computer virus that his 853rd century self created. Solaris is defeated and banished to the outskirts of the galaxy by Starman before he can take action.

In the future, Solaris becomes a reoccurring villain plaguing Superman's descendants, until he is considered the greatest enemy of the Superman dynasty. This continues until the 505th century Superman sacrifices himself to reprogram Solaris. At that point, Solaris reforms and becomes an ally of the Superman dynasty.

However, Solaris is unable to rise to the high standard set by the Supermen. He rises to lead a group called the Pancosmic Justice Jihad, which takes advantage of the paranoia of a dark age to justify an aggressive agenda of attacks. The return of Superman Prime (Kal-El, the original Superman) in the 701st century triggers a great spiritual revival, with humanity turning against Solaris and other artificial computers.

Solaris is returned to its role as a secondary sun, considered inferior to the yellow primary Sun which serves as Superman's current Fortress of Solitude. His resentment leads him to plot with the 853rd century Starman and Vandal Savage to destroy Superman Prime and the Justice League. However, this plan is thwarted by the Justice League of the past (Steel, Plastic Man, Big Barda, Huntress, and Zauriel). Superman Prime destroys Solaris using his newly-acquired Green Lantern ring.

== Other versions ==
An alternate timeline version of Solaris appears in Future State.

== In other media ==
- Solaris appears in All-Star Superman (2011), voiced by Robin Atkin Downes.
- Solaris appears as a character summon in Scribblenauts Unmasked: A DC Comics Adventure.

== Reception ==
ComicsAlliance praised Solaris for being a major villain who did not necessarily need to be tied to his story of origin, nor appear often, unlike Bane or Doomsday.
