= Shadow Man (Michael LeRoi) =

Publication information
- Publisher: Valiant Comics/Acclaim Comics
- First appearance: Shadowman vol. 2 #1 (1997)
- Created by: Garth Ennis; Ashley Wood

In-story information
- Alter ego: Michael "Mike" LeRoi
- Team affiliations: N/A
- Partnerships: N/A
- Notable aliases: Shadow Man, Zero
- Abilities: The Mask of Shadows knitted to Michael's ribcage gives him the following abilities: Access to all the power wielded by past Shadow Men; Absorb the knowledge and skills of those he kills; Regeneration; Superhuman strength; Enhanced endurance; Ability to travel between Deadside and Liveside via the use of his dead brother's teddy bear

Shadow Man (Michael LeRoi) is a fictional antihero who appears in comic books co-published by Valiant Comics and Acclaim Entertainment. The character debuted in Shadowman Volume 2 #1 (May 1997), and was created by writer Garth Ennis and artist Ashley Wood. He is the second character to hold the title of Shadowman after Jack Boniface and also stars in the Shadow Man video game franchise by Acclaim Entertainment.

Michael LeRoi, a 32-year old former English literature student-turned-gambler was tricked into servitude by an evil bokor after the massacre of his family. He is rescued by Mama Nettie, a powerful voodoo priestess, who knits the Mask of Shadows to his ribcage. This act gives him a vast array of Voodoo powers, transforming him into the "Lord of Deadside", Shadow Man.

== Publication history ==
Acclaim Entertainment, which bought Valiant in 1996, started a new Shadowman series under the Acclaim Comics banner. Written by Garth Ennis and drawn by Ashley Wood, the second series set a much darker tone to the series and moved it away from sci-fi to a more Voodoo magic/mystical setting with horror elements.

== Fictional character biography ==
Michael LeRoi was a former English literature student. He dropped out of his English Literature classes and started gambling, which exhausted his funds. Mike was then forced to work as a taxi driver in Chicago, keeping his failure from his family in New Orleans. During a night routine, Mike's passenger was kidnapped, leaving $20,000 in a briefcase. Mike took the money back to New Orleans to spend it with his family, using some of it to pay for his brother Luke's operation. Unfortunately, the gang that took his passenger tracked him down, threatening him and his family unless he pay them the money back. Desperate, Michael sought out a bokor to give him protection against the gang. The protection spell eases Mike's paranoia and he takes a job in Los Angeles. His family offers to drive him to the airport but are attacked en route by the gang, causing the car to swerve off of the I-10 bridge into Lake Pontchartrain, drowning his mother Ella-May, father John, and Luke. Due to the protection spell, Mike survives as it was never intended to protect his family. In the hospital, Mike is confronted by the bokor who insists on payment but Mike refuses, overcome with guilt from causing his family's death. In response, the bokor forcibly conscripts Mike to be his zombie slave under the pseudonym "Zero", erasing his memory and forcing him to act as a brutal hitman with nothing else to live for.

Five years later, Mike still operates as Zero, spending his downtime at a local bar called the Wild at Heart, owned by a man named Josey Small who is Mike's only friend. Following the murder of Jack Boniface at the hands of several demonically possessed corpses called the Deadmen, the powerful caplata Mama Nettie seeks out Mike and used her powers to implant the Mask of Shadows, a powerful voodoo artifact, in his chest. Mike used these powers to defeat the Deadmen, becoming Shadow Man. However, his distrust of Mama Nettie caused her to raise Jack Boniface from the dead to kill him. During this same time, he regained his memory with the help of a whore named Claudine, defeated the zombie Boniface, and discovered that the bokor who betrayed him was none other than Josey Small. Begrudgingly joining forces with Mama Nettie, Mike is able to successfully defeat Josey, who Nettie reanimates as a zombie to do their bidding. To Mike's dismay, Nettie takes possession of Claudine's body permanently and strikes a deal with him in order to pay back their debts to the Loa which he reluctantly agrees to.

In the following months, Mike now runs the Wild at Heart with the Zombie Josey as his helper while maintaining a mostly sexual relationship with Nettie in her new body. He is drawn into a murder investigation by New Orleans police detective Persephone DeFilo after noticing that the victims have been killed in ritualistic fashion relating to a voodoo espirit. This investigation leads Mike to a secret society known as Societé, led by a malevolent bokor named Judge Napolean LaCroix, who shares a history with Mama Nettie. Attempting to lay low, Mike relocates with DeFilo to Florida where they discover she has been hexed with Espirit De Malchance, a curse which causes catastrophic bad luck. Seeking a way to undo the hex, Mike returns to New Orleans to face LaCroix, ending his brief relationship with DeFilo. Back in New Orleans, Mike and Nettie devise a plan to kill LaCroix which culminates in a bloody skirmish between Mike and LaCroix's enforcer, Bruté, a formidable and cannibalistic Haitian bokor. After being eviscerated and immolated, Mike travels to Deadside where he finds his mother Ella-May who helps him embrace his power, allowing him to defeat Bruté. LaCroix is ultimately spared at Nettie's behest while she and Mike continue their previous arrangement.

Three years later, Mike has the Mask of Shadows stripped away from him by the Les Chevaux Archanés, a voodoo circle led by a man known as Pére Jean, who also restores Claudine by trapping Nettie in a govi. Mike discovers that Pére Jean is in league with a mysterious corporation known as Orb Industries, who is attempting harvest the energy of Deadside, the spiritual plane where all souls go when they die, without exception. While contending with Jean and Orb Industries, he is disheartened to learn of Persephone DeFilo's brutal murder at the hands of a female mercenary known as California Mah while struggling with the emptiness brought on by the mask's removal. As Michael sets out for revenge, he reunites with Claudine who informs him of Jean's true motives. From both Claudine and Jean, Mike learns the origin of the Mask of Shadows and discovers the true purpose of the Shadow Man, who is descended from a line of African voodoo warriors blessed with supernatural powers to protect the world from threats originating from Deadside. Mike is able to embrace his role as Shadow Man and regain the piece of his soul that was lost during the removal of the Mask of Shadows which he no longer needs to channel his powers. Unfortunately, California Mah attacks the Les Chevaux Archanés temple and kills Pére Jean. A short time later, Mike comes into conflict with a group of transdimensional dinosaurs known as the Favored, who are working for Mah. During his struggle against the Favored, Mike travels to the timeless realm Ife where he meets a bokor named Namawambe who acts as his mentor. Upon returning to his dimension, the Favored reveal that Mah has kidnapped Claudine and Mike sets out to find her. Losing their trail in a sundown town in Georgia, Mike is ostracized and discriminated against by the racist townsfolk, forcing him to use his power to take the appearance of a dead white man. The townsfolk become more welcoming to Mike in his disguise but he is forced to battle a group of demons summoned by the Ku Klux Klan to kill him after they turn on everyone with "mongrel blood". Continuing his search for Claudine, Mike is pulled into Deadside by a mysterious force and uncovers a plot by the lord of chaos Erebus to escape to the mortal world. Mike allies with the souls of his uncle Thierry, a soldier who perished in the Vietnam War and his superior officer Ray Garrison. Garrison agrees to lead Mike to a portal back to the mortal world but upon arrival, he betrays him and attacks Thierry, revealing himself to be possessed by Erebus. Erebus reveals that Mike is his son before they prepare to battle, with Mike unaware that Claudine is the battery powering the gateway that pulled him into Deadside.

== Publication history ==
Shadow Man was co-published by Valiant Comics and Acclaim Comics for 29 issues. The first issue of Volume 2 was released in March 1997 and ran for 20 issues, with the final issue being released in June 1998. The first issue of Volume 3 was released March 1999 and ran for 6 issues, with the final issue being released in December 1999. An unfinished 3rd series saw 3 of its 4 planned issues released before Acclaim ceased their comics printing before their bankruptcy.

== In other media ==
=== Video games ===
Acclaim released the Shadow Man video game in November 1999 on the PlayStation, Nintendo 64, Dreamcast, and PC. A sequel, entitled Shadow Man: 2econd Coming was released for PlayStation 2 in 2002, following the events after the end of the first game. The events of the first game were loosely adapted into a single issue of Shadow Man volume 3.

The Shadow Man video game was a critical and commercial success, selling over 2 million copies and garnering an IGN rating of 9.1/10 for the first game. Shadow Man also garnered a 93% rating for N64 Magazine, the same score as N64 favorites Donkey Kong 64 and Mario Kart 64. IGN.com named Shadow Man the N64 game of the month for August 1999. And IGN.com also named Shadow Man one of the three most important black characters on the N64 saying "Shadow Man is one of the strongest, most uncompromising characters in any game on any platform." The Shadowman video game was released around the world and translated into a number of languages including German, Russian, Spanish, French and Italian among others.

=== Film ===
Rapper/actor Ice Cube approached Acclaim Entertainment in 1999 about creating a Shadowman feature film. Acclaim declined the offer, as they were focused on the success of the Shadowman video game franchise. Others linked with the role include Will Smith, DMX and The Game. As of 2016, there have been no reports to produce a film based on the Michael LeRoi version of the character.
