= For a Few Troubles More =

British comic book story

- The cover of the collected edition of For a Few Troubles More featuring Ivor Thompson (left) and Dougie Patterson (right). Art by John McCrea.
- Publisher: Fleetway Publications
- Publication date: 17 March – 9 June 1990
- Title(s): Crisis #40-43, #45-46; 17 March to 9 June 1990
- Main character(s): Dougie Patterson; Ivor Thompson

Creative team
- Writer: Garth Ennis
- Artist: John McCrea
- Letterer: Annie Parkhouse
- Colourist(s): John McCrea; Wendy Simpson
- Editor: Steve MacManus
- For a Few Troubles More - A Crisis Accident: ISBN 9781853862083

"For a Few Troubles More" is a British comic story. It was originally published in the adult-orientated anthology comic Crisis between 17 March and 9 June 1990. It was written by Garth Ennis and drawn by John McCrea as a sequel to their earlier story "Troubled Souls". The story is set during the then-ongoing Troubles in Northern Ireland, focusing on the antics of smart-mouthed Dougie Patterson and half-witted Ivor Thompson, both introduced as supporting characters in "Troubled Souls". Ennis would later revisit the characters once more in his creator-owned Dicks series for Caliber Comics and Avatar Press.

== Creation ==
After the success of "Troubled Souls", Garth Ennis and John McCrea were approached by Crisis editor Steve MacManus to make a follow-up. Ennis would later explain that they both wanted to take a look at "another side of life in Belfast", deliberately pushing the Troubles themselves into the background so they could "get into the dafter side of things". As Ennis had produced the religious-themed "True Faith" in the interim, he felt the move into comedy was "as much to avoid being pigeonholed as anything else".

== Publishing history ==
The six-part story was published in Crisis #40 to #46 (being absent from #44). McCrea fell behind from early in publication, and much of the colouring was provided by Wendy Simpson (wife of artist Will Simpson). Like "Troubled Souls" the story was compiled into a collected edition soon after publication finished; in light of the nature of the leads, the subtitle was changed from A Crisis Graphic Novel to A Crisis Accident.

Ennis would later note he and McCrea's fondness for the characters - "Ivor's optimism, Dougie's fully justified pessimism, and their inherent inability to organise the proverbial piss-up in a brewery" - and subsequently chronicled their attempts to become private detectives in Dicks.

== Plot summary ==
Dougie is marrying his pregnant girlfriend Valerie, but his original best man Tom has left Belfast. Instead he turns to Ivor, who has abandoned a short-lived career in the Ulster Volunteer Force after accidentally shooting himself in the foot and spending time in prison. Valerie's father thinks Dougie will struggle to provide for his daughter, and suggests he make friends with her wealthy uncle Dennis, while Ivor finds himself looking after his poteen-brewing uncle Shuggie's pet snake. Ivor and Dougie then fall foul of local thug Big Billy after a snake-related understanding, and drop him on the Falls Road in the hope the local Fenians will sort him out - though the snake is accidentally run over soon afterwards by an Army Land Rover. Shuggie dies of a heart attack when Ivor tells him.

Ivor organises a stag party for Dougie which ends up with him tied naked to a police van, and the wedding day itself starts off just as poorly when Ivor accidentally smashes the officiant's face in with a car door. Nevertheless Dougie and Valerie marry, though Ivor's best man's speech is a drunken avalanche of bad taste before the pair leave for Torremolinos on their honeymoon.

While Dougie is away - and dealing with an overdose of laxatives administered by his best man as a prank - Ivor finds himself left fulfilling Shuggie's poteen orders for local thugs. This is complicated by Ivor being haunted by the ghosts of both Shuggie and Shuggie's snake, and Ivor's habit of drinking the poteen. Nevertheless, he makes the order just as Dougie returns from Spain, hellbent on revenge - only to instantly forgive him. The pair are then found by a vengeful Big Billy. Having realised how powerful their friendship is, Ivor and Dougie square up to Billy and prepare to put him in his place. The pair are soon recovering in hospital with numerous broken bones, visited by Valerie and Shuggie's ghost.

== Collected editions ==
Title	ISBN	Publisher	Release date	Contents
For a Few Troubles More - A Crisis Accident	9781853862083	Fleetway Publications	1991	Material from Crisis #40-43 and #45-46

== Reception ==
"For a Few Troubles More" has received generally positive reviews for taking a different approach to the Troubles, and for its bawdy toilet humour.
