= Back to Brooklyn =

Back to Brooklyn may refer to:

- Back to Brooklyn (comics), a 2008 comics series
- Back to Brooklyn (album), a 2013 live album by Barbra Streisand
- NXT TakeOver: Back to Brooklyn, a 2016 wrestling event
