= True faith =

True faith may refer to:

- One true faith, the religious concept that claims superiority over other beliefs

== Music ==
- "True Faith" (song), a song by the English band New Order
- True Faith (band), a Filipino musical group
- True Faith, an alias for Jeff Mills, American techno DJ and producer
- Tru Faith, a UK garage act best known in a collaboration as Tru Faith & Dub Conspiracy

== Literature ==
- True Faith (comics), a comics story from Crisis, written by Garth Ennis
- True Faith and Allegiance, a political thriller novel
