= Preacher: Gone to Texas =

Graphic novel

Preacher: Gone to Texas is a graphic novel by Garth Ennis and Steve Dillon, published by Vertigo/DC.

== Contents ==
Preacher: Gone to Texas is a story in which an angel and a demon conceive an entity that is said to be as powerful as God.

== Reception ==
Steve Faragher reviewed Preacher: Gone to Texas for Arcane magazine, rating it a 9 out of 10 overall. Faragher comments that "a non-stop road-trip of a novel that is as repulsive and scary as it is remorselessly fascinating. This is the kind of story that can only be told in this format, and it's a masterpiece of the genre. They don't come much better than this."
