= Garth Ennis =

Northern Irish comics writer (born 1970)

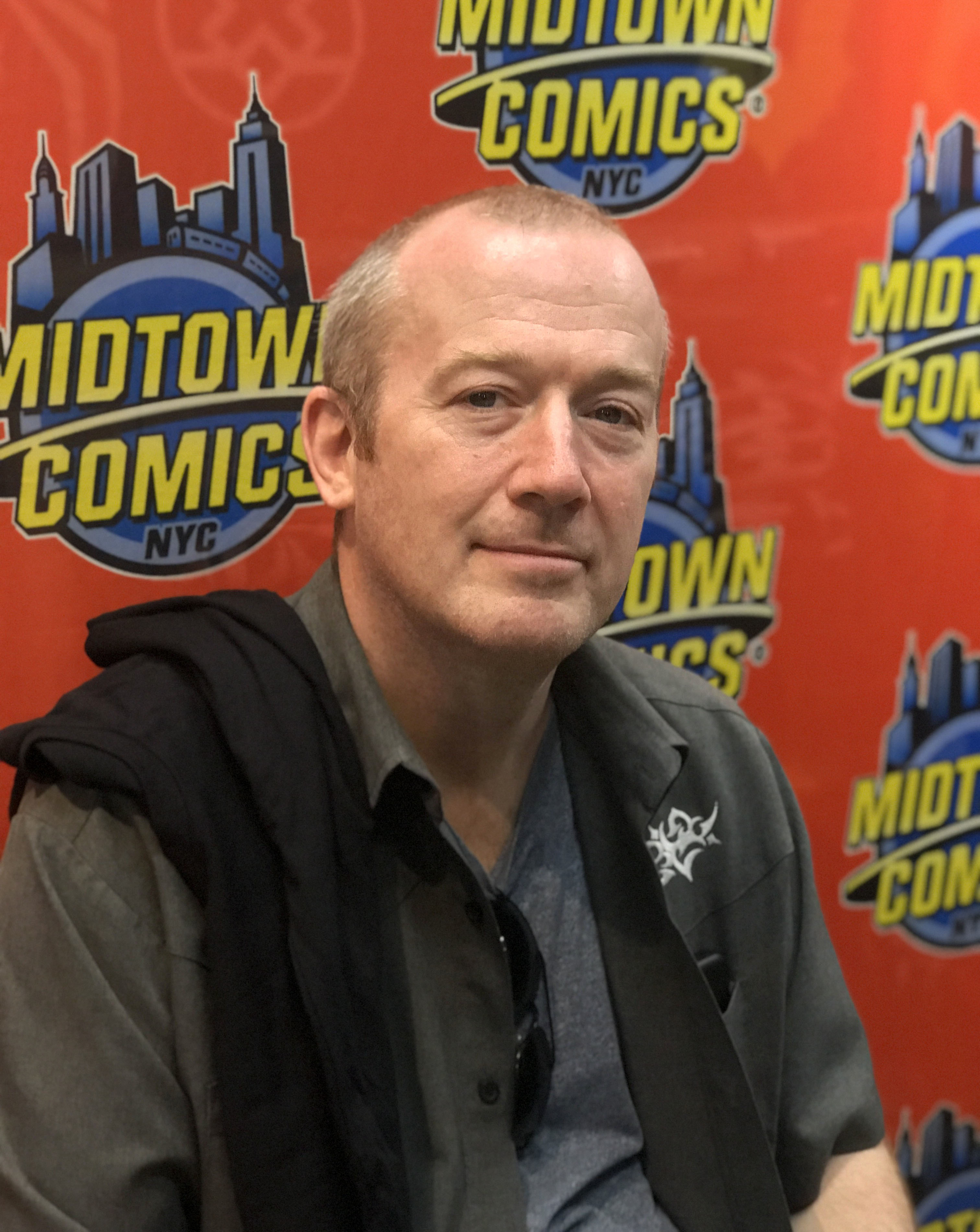
- Ennis at a book signing at Midtown Comics in Manhattan in 2019
- Born: 16 January 1970 (age 56) Holywood, County Down, Northern Ireland
- Area: Writer
- Notable works: Preacher; The Boys; Hellblazer; Punisher; Hitman
- Awards: National Comics Award for Best Writer, 1997; UK Comic Art Award for Best Writer, 1997; Eisner Award for Best Writer, 1998

Garth Ennis (born 16 January 1970) is a Northern Irish comics writer. He is best known for his acclaimed run on the Vertigo series Hellblazer, his own Vertigo creation Preacher with artist Steve Dillon, his nine-year run on Marvel Comics' Punisher franchise, and The Boys with artist Darick Robertson. He has collaborated with artists such as Dillon and Glenn Fabry on Preacher, John McCrea on Hitman, Marc Silvestri on The Darkness, and Carlos Ezquerra on both Preacher and Hitman.

His work has won him recognition in the comics industry, including nominations for the Comics Buyer's Guide Award for Favorite Writer in 1997, 1998, 1999, and 2000. He has received numerous awards and recognition from specialised British and American publications and organisations, such as the UK Comic Art Award and the Comics Buyer's Guide Fan Awards.

== Early life ==
Ennis was born in Holywood, County Down.

Raised without religion, Ennis's first exposure to the idea of God was as a six-year-old in primary school; Ennis's teacher told the class that God was a being who could see inside their hearts, was always around them, and would ultimately reward or punish them. Ennis described the idea as bewildering, strange and terrifying. He later used this experience in his comic book series Preacher, whose protagonist is slapped after telling his grandmother that he finds the concept of God "scary". Although the fictional violence in that story was not reflected in Ennis's real-life upbringing, his classmates later reassured each other that they all loved God, though Ennis said, "I think I hate him." Ennis later asked his mother about God, and when she asked him what he thought about the idea, Ennis responded, "It sounds kind of stupid," a statement the adult Ennis clarified was meant to mask his fear. His mother's response was, "Well, there you are, then." In 1980, Ennis won second place in the Young Ornithologist's Club's Young Ornithologist of the Year competition in the 10-12 age bracket.

In 1987, Ennis befriended artist John McCrea while shopping at the first comic book specialty shop in Belfast, which had been opened by McCrea and another friend. Ennis later asked McCrea to illustrate his first professional comics project. The shop was where Ennis first met comics writer Alan Moore, who advised him to focus on creator-owned work rather than letting comic companies take ownership of his intellectual property.

== Career ==
=== UK work ===
Ennis began his comic-writing career on his nineteenth birthday in 1989, with the series "Troubled Souls", in the British anthology Crisis. Illustrated by Ennis's friend John McCrea, living in Northern Ireland meant he did not require reference material for the Belfast-based series. "Troubled Souls" tells the story of a young, apolitical Protestant man caught up by fate in the violence of The Troubles. It spawned a sequel, "For a Few Troubles More", a broad comedy featuring two supporting characters from Troubled Souls, Dougie and Ivor. In 1997, American publisher Caliber Comics released Dicks, another Dougie and Ivor adventure. Follow-ups featuring these characters were subsequently published by Avatar Press.

Of his decision to write "Troubled Souls" as his debut comics work, Ennis remarked "It was the kind of thing that was doing well at the time. I ought to be completely clear and say that, with hindsight, what Troubled Souls really represented was naked ambition. It was a direct attempt to get published. And that was the road that seemed most likely to lead me to success."

Another series for Crisis was "True Faith", a religious satire inspired by his school days, drawn by Warren Pleece. A collected edition was issued in 1990, but a series of complaints from churches and religious groups led to it being quickly withdrawn from sale. It was republished in 1997 by the U.S. DC Comics imprint Vertigo. The plot follows an atheist teenager attending Christian school. After publicly insulting his classmates' religion to get back at a girl he was interested in who did not return his romantic feelings, the boy attracts the attention of a maltheist and is coerced into helping him murder clergy and bomb churches. Following the death of the maltheist, the book ends with the atheistic hero willingly carrying out a shooting at his Christian school. In the introduction to the Vertigo edition, Ennis described this as wish-fulfillment. Shortly after, Ennis began to write for the UK comics series 2000 AD, and later wrote stories for the title's flagship character, Judge Dredd, taking over from creator John Wagner for several years. Ennis's Dredd stories include "Muzak Killer", a satirical attack on mainstream pop music; "Emerald Isle", a tongue-in-cheek story set in Ennis's native Ireland; and the 20-part "Judgment Day". Ennis also contributed the story "Time Flies", with artist Philip Bond, dealing with time-travel paradoxes and Nazis.

In 2001, following much work in the United States, Ennis briefly returned to UK comics to write the Judge Dredd story "Helter Skelter". Ennis said afterward there was "not a hope" to his returning to writing Dredd as he was generally not happy with his run. "I'm too close to Dredd. I like him too much. I can't tamper with the formula; nor can I take the piss the way I do with superheroes".

=== DC Comics ===
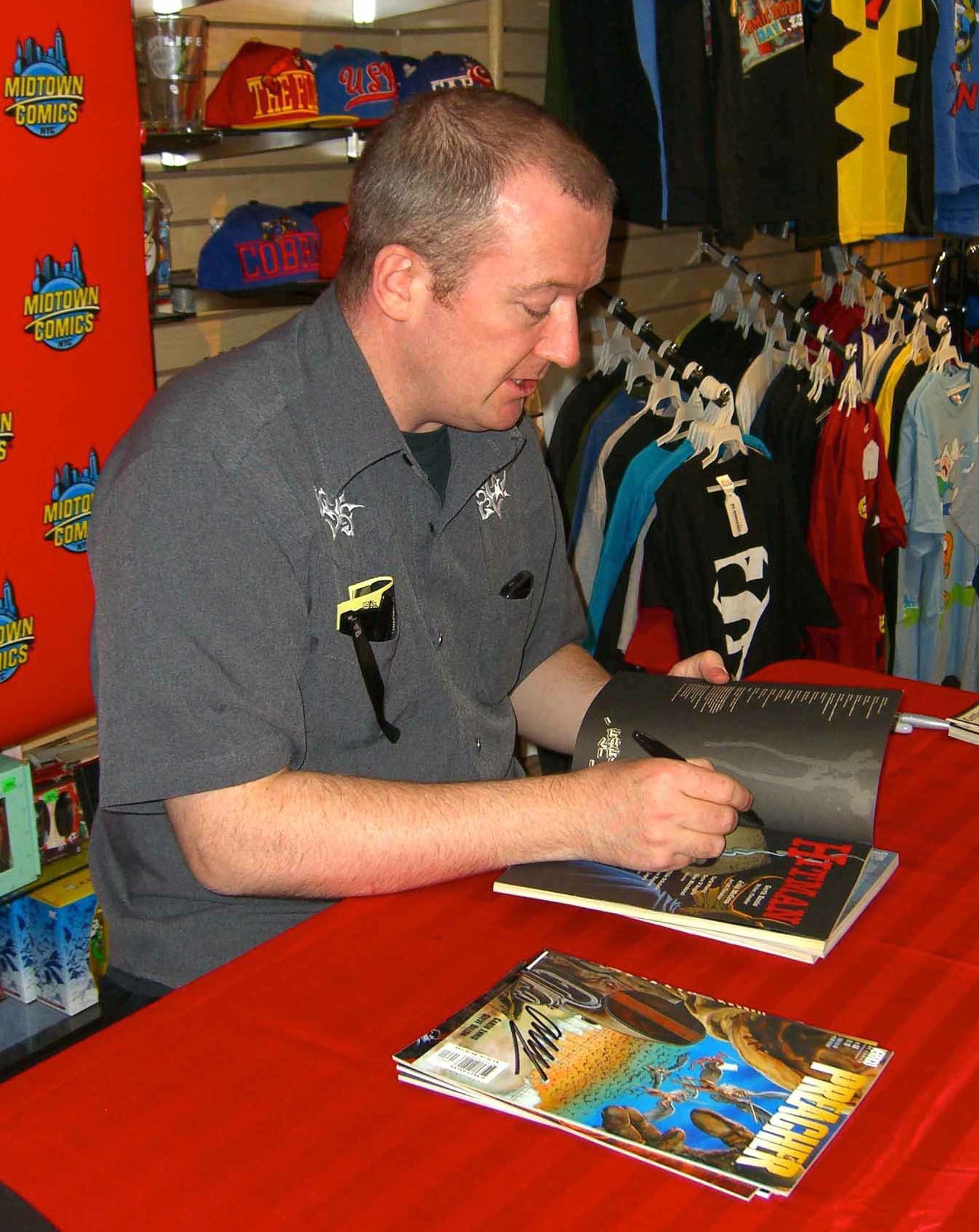
Ennis signing copies of Hitman and Preacher at a 19 April 2012 appearance at Midtown Comics Downtown in Manhattan

In 1991, Ennis took over the horror series Hellblazer, which was published under DC Comics' Vertigo imprint. He wrote the series through 1994, with Steve Dillon as the regular artist during the second half of his run; Ennis and Dillon later became regular collaborators on other comics, including the one-shot Heartland which explored one of Hellblazer's secondary characters. Years afterward, Ennis briefly returned to Hellblazer for the five-part "Son of Man" story with artist John Higgins.

Ennis and Dillon went on to create the 66-issue Vertigo series Preacher, which ran from 1995 to 2000, and is considered Ennis's landmark work. Its plot concerns a preacher with supernatural powers who literally searches for the Christian God who had abandoned His creation. Mixing influences from Western and horror films with twisted humor and religious satire, Preacher drew plaudits for Ennis from all sections of the media; the Guardian newspaper voted one of the Preacher collections its Book of the Week, and film director Kevin Smith described it as "more fun than going to the movies." The AMC television series Preacher, adapted from the comic, premiered in 2016. From 1993 to 1995, Ennis worked with artist John McCrea on another DC title, The Demon, during which the duo introduced superpowered contract killer Tommy Monaghan, a character Ennis and McCrea launched into his own title, Hitman. With the exception of a reverent depiction of Superman, Ennis's writing on Hitman was known for portraying superheroes as ridiculous, a characteristic commonly found in Ennis' material involving such characters. Hitman ran 60 issues from 1996 to 2001 with several specials and spinoffs. Following the main title's cancellation, Ennis and McCrea returned to the world of Hitman for a Justice League crossover and later a comedic miniseries, following the supporting characters from Hitman, entitled Section Eight.

Other DC comics projects Ennis wrote include Bloody Mary for the Helix imprint; a run on The Authority for the Wildstorm imprint; and the first arc of the Authority spin-off series Midnighter, as well as a story for the series Unknown Soldier and the original creations Goddess and Pride & Joy, all for the Vertigo imprint.

=== Marvel Comics ===
Ennis's first work for Marvel was Punisher Kills the Marvel Universe in 1995. Ennis quit writing for Marvel after completing this work after the dialogue had been altered without his consultation; however, following the end of Hitman, Ennis was once again offered the chance to write The Punisher at Marvel. The initial 12-issue miniseries was illustrated by Steve Dillon, who also illustrated much of Ennis's subsequent 37-issue run of the Marvel Knights Punisher series. No longer finding violence comedic in light of the September 11th terrorist attacks, Ennis relaunched The Punisher under Marvel's MAX imprint, allowing for darker stories. His 60-issue run was released concurrently with several Ennis-penned Punisher miniseries, such as Born and Barracuda, and the one-shots The End, The Cell, and The Tyger. The creators of Punisher: War Zone have declared Ennis's The Punisher MAX run to have been one of the major influences on the film, and Ennis and Dillon reunited for a Punisher: War Zone miniseries to tie-in with the film.

In 2008, Ennis ended his five-year run on the Punisher series to write the Marvel miniseries War Is Hell: The First Flight of the Phantom Eagle. Illustrated by Howard Chaykin, it featured the little-used character Phantom Eagle, a World War I pilot. Other series Ennis wrote for Marvel include Where Monsters Dwell, Spider-Man, Ghost Rider, Hulk, Thor, and a series of Goran Parlov-illustrated Nick Fury stories under the MAX imprint. These stories stripped superspy Fury of his science-fiction trappings in favor of military and CIA situations, including a focus on the First Indochina War in one storyline.

=== Independent publishers and creator-owned work ===
Ennis has written a 2008 Dan Dare miniseries, published by Virgin Comics, and origin stories for The Darkness for Image Comics and Shadow Man for Valiant Comics. Ennis' original comics creations include the five-issue mini-series Seven Brothers for Virgin Comics, on which Ennis collaborated with film director John Woo; the vulgar superhero satire The Pro for Image Comics; the post-apocalyptic Just a Pilgrim for Black Bull Press; and War Stories for DC and later Avatar Press.

Avatar has published the bulk of Ennis's creator-owned material, which includes the post-9/11 war story 303; a western entitled Streets of Glory; the extreme horror comic Crossed; Back to Brooklyn, a crime limited series co-written with Jimmy Palmiotti for Image Comics; Caliban, a science fiction horror series inspired by the movie Prometheus; and Chronicles of Wormwood, which dealt with the friendship between an African-American Jesus Christ and a benign Antichrist. In 2011, Avatar commissioned Ennis to write and direct an original short film, Stitched, produced to drum up support for a possible feature. Ennis was also the initial writer for the Stitched comic book tie-in, also published by Avatar.

Ennis has written both creator-owned and commissioned work for Dynamite Entertainment, most notably The Boys. Mainly illustrated by co-creator Darick Robertson, whom Ennis previously worked with on the Marvel series Fury: Peacemaker and Punisher: Born, The Boys ran for 72 issues before concluding in 2012. This creator-owned extended series was a superhero satire, bringing the genre to places far darker than Ennis had before, by portraying superheroes not only as ridiculous but also amoral, malevolent, and deviant. Announced in 2006 and originally published by DC's Wildstorm imprint, The Boys was cancelled after six issues because DC Comics was uneasy with the anti-superhero tone of the work; however, the series was subsequently picked up by Dynamite. The series was successful and spawned spinoffs, including a miniseries focused on the villain protagonist Billy Butcher. In 2019, The Boys was adapted into a TV series by Amazon Prime Video.

Other original projects for Dynamite include the Howard Chaykin-illustrated crime comic Red Team and a metaseries of war comics called Battlefields, made up of mini-series including Night Witches, Dear Billy, and Tankies. Among his commissioned material, Ennis wrote the pulp character The Shadow for Dynamite. In a surprise move, Ennis attempted to crowdfund a children's book through the Kickstarter platform. Unable to secure a children's book publisher due to its violent ending (in which the main character is eaten by a monster), Erf, as the book became known, was ultimately published by Dynamite.

Ennis wrote Sara in October 2018 for TKO Studios. Sara was a war story following a team of female Russian snipers as they beat back the Nazi invaders during a brutal winter campaign on the WWII Eastern Front. This was followed in 2025 by Partisan, the story of a Russian woman who becomes a partisan soldier during the German invasion of the Soviet Union in 1941. Both Partisan and Sara were drawn by Steve Epting.

Ennis wrote Stringbags in 2020 for the United States Naval Institute. The graphic novel relates the adventures of Allied airmen who crewed a Fairey Swordfish airplane during World War II.

== Influences and views on comics ==
Ennis has explained that as an avid reader of British war comics during his formative years, he did not read superhero comics until his late teens, at which point he found them ridiculous, although he frequently cites mid-eighties superhero material among his influences. For instance, Ennis noted that the first American comic book he read in its entirety and appreciated was The Dark Knight Returns by Frank Miller, an author who proved influential on Ennis's subsequent work, with Ennis citing Miller's portrayal of Nick Fury in Elektra: Assassin as his model for writing the character. Ennis said he was "blown away" by Miller, as The Dark Knight Returns was the first time he encountered a comic writer who approached his work like a novelist. While Ennis was already interested in a creative profession, Frank Miller's material and other mid-eighties mature readers comics like Swamp Thing and Love and Rockets inspired him to look into specifically writing comics as a career.

Despite being influenced by superhero material and having written a number of superhero stories both for and outside Marvel and DC, Ennis is noted for subverting the genre and mocking the characters in this work. For example, in the 1995 one-shot special Punisher Kills the Marvel Universe, Ennis has the Punisher kill every single superhero and supervillain on Earth. As a World War II aficionado, Ennis also said he finds characters like Captain America "borderline offensive, because to me the reality of World War II was very human people, ordinary flesh-and-blood guys who slogged it out in miserable, flooded foxholes. So adding some fantasy superhero narrative, that has always annoyed me a little bit." Nonetheless, Ennis has admitted to having appreciation for the idea behind Wonder Woman if not the character, and even to outright liking Superman, the latter of whom he was noted for writing respectfully in Hitman. Ennis has since explained that his issue with superhero comics is not the genre in and of itself, but more its dominance in the comic book industry and the constraints imposed on superhero stories by publishers. "I find most superhero stories completely meaningless," Ennis said. "Which is not to say I don't think there's potential for the genre – Alan Moore and Warren Ellis have both done interesting work with the notion of what it might be like to be and think beyond human, see Miracleman, Watchmen and Supergod. But so long as the industry is geared towards fulfilling audience demand – ie, for the same brightly coloured characters doing the same thing forever – you're never going to see any real growth. The stories can't end, so they'll never mean anything."

Ennis has remarked that in terms of Marvel and DC characters, he prefers the ones he describes as more grounded, such as the Punisher, John Constantine, and Nick Fury. In particular, Ennis describes the Punisher as resembling the British comics characters he loved as a child more than Marvel and DC superheroes, which provided him with a way to the character. Though his Constantine stories, such as "Dangerous Habits" (1991), are widely acclaimed, Ennis grew to dislike the character. He told Vulture in 2014 that he had come to find Constantine morally repulsive and had "no desire to write a character who essentially gets his pals killed and then explains that they were doomed anyway, so why not just spend their lives and use them up."

== Personal life ==
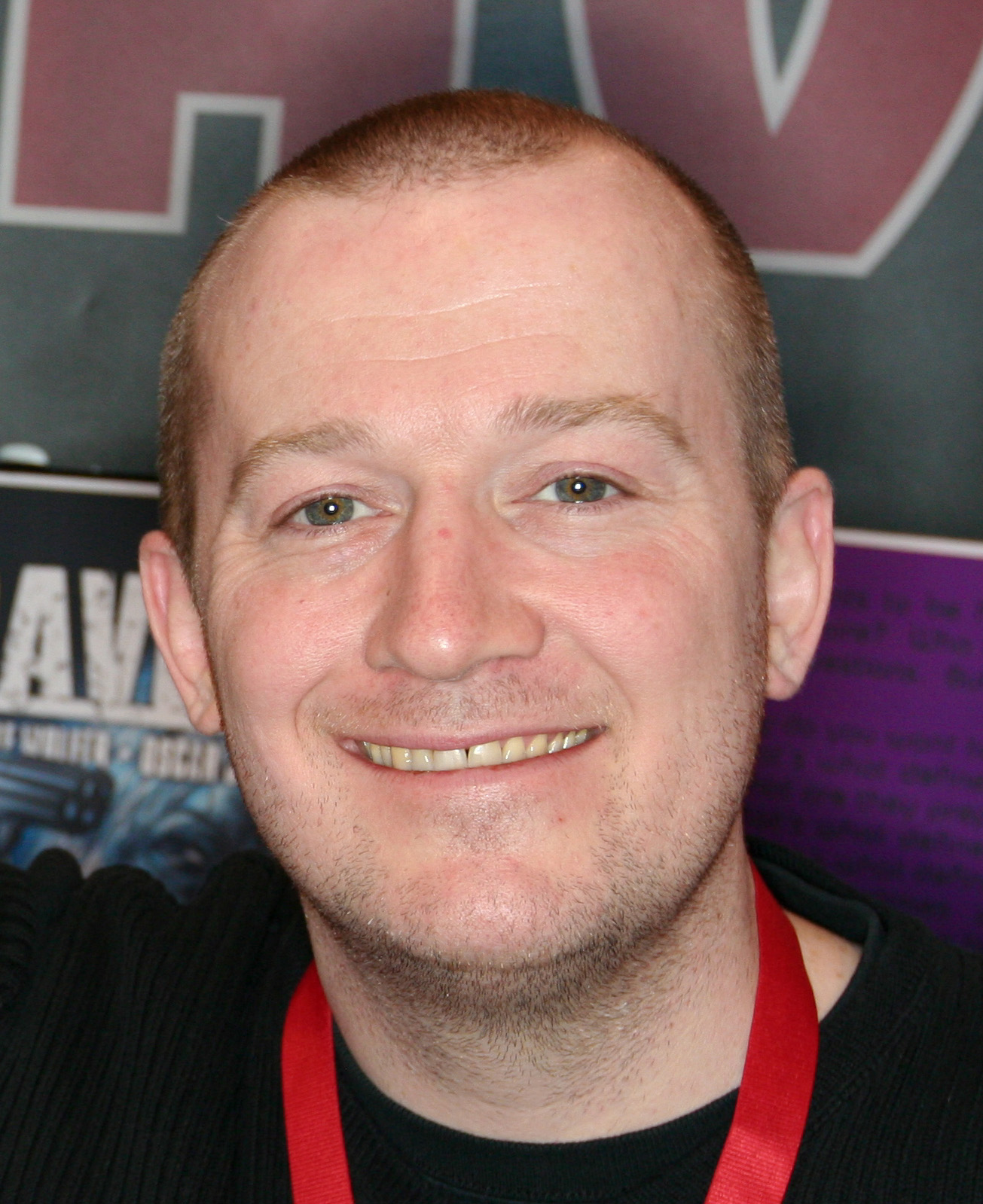
Ennis in 2009

Ennis had become a citizen of the United States by July 2016. He lives in New York City, and is married.

Ennis is an atheist, and said he feels disdain toward religion which he has attributed to growing up in Northern Ireland during the Troubles. While he was not directly involved in the conflict as a child, he would hear about it each morning on the radio. Ennis has related that having been raised secular, religiously motivated violence made no sense to him, characterising such conflict as a disagreement among participants over "how to worship their imaginary friend. That more than anything gave me my distrust of religion."

Ennis has maintained an interest in military history since childhood, inspired by the war comics from his youth.

== Awards ==
- 1997 National Comics Award for Best Writer
- 1997 UK Comic Art Award for Best Writer (for Hitman, Preacher, and Saint of Killers)
- 1997 UK Comic Art Award for Best Collection (for Preacher: Gone to Texas)
- 1998 Eisner Award for Best Writer (for Hitman, Preacher, Unknown Soldier and Blood Mary: Lady Liberty)
- 1998 Eisner Award for Best Single Issue (for Hitman #34: "Of Thee I Sing")
- 1999 Eagle Award for Favorite Color Comic Book (for Preacher)
- 2001 National Comics Award for Best Supporting Character (for Natt The Hat, from Hitman)
- 2021 Irish Comics News Award for Best Irish Writer (for "Hellmann at the Twilight of the Reich" in Action 2020)

=== Nominations ===
- 1993 Eisner Award for the Best Writer (for Hellblazer)
- 1994 Eisner Award for the Best Writer (for Hellblazer)
- 1996 Eisner Award for the Best Writer (for Preacher and Goddess)
- 1997 Comics Buyer's Guide Fan Award for Favorite Writer
- 1997 UK Comic Art Awards for Best Original Graphic Novel (for Preacher Special)
- 1998 Comics Buyer's Guide Fan Award for Favorite Writer
- 1999 Eagle Award for Favourite Comics Writer
- 1999 Eagle Award for Favourite Comics Character (for Jesse Custer)
- 1999 Comics Buyer's Guide Award for Favorite Writer
- 2000 Comics Buyer's Guide Award for Favorite Writer
- 2001 Eisner Award for Best Writer (for Preacher)
- 2001 Eisner Award for Best Serialized Story (for Preacher #59–66)
- 2001 Comics Buyer's Guide Award for Favorite Writer
- 2002 Comics Buyer's Guide Award for Favorite Writer
- 2002 National Comics Award for Best Writer in Comics Today
- 2003 Comics Buyer's Guide Award for Favorite Writer

== Bibliography ==
=== UK publishers ===
- The Tosspot Four (with John McCrea, unreleased strip submitted to the anthology magazine Deadline c. 1989)
  - As the strip was rejected by the magazine, Ennis and McCrea produced only one 6-page episode before abandoning the idea.
  - The only existing episode was first published in The Mighty World of McCrea (sc, 200 pages, Kickstarter, 2020, ISBN 1-838-17530-X)
- Crisis (anthology, Fleetway):
  - Troubled Souls (with John McCrea, in #15–20 and 22–27, 1989) collected as Troubled Souls (tpb, 96 pages, 1990, ISBN 1-85386-174-X)
  - True Faith (with Warren Pleece, in #29–34 and 36–38, 1989–1990) collected as True Faith (tpb, 96 pages, 1990, ISBN 1-85386-201-0)
  - Suburban Hell:
    - Suburban Hell was an umbrella title for unconnected one-off stories, linked thematically by their suburban setting:
      - "The Unusual Obsession of Mrs. Orton" (with Phillip Swarbrick, in #36, 1990)
      - "The Ballad of Andrew Brown" (with Phil Winslade, in #43, 1990)
      - "Light Me" (with Phil Winslade, in #61, 1991)
      - "Charlie Lives with Fang and Snuffles" (with Ian Oldham, in #62, 1991)
    - Two more Suburban Hell stories were published in Crisis' companion title Revolver:
      - Revolver: The Horror Special: "A Dog and His Bastard" (with Phillip Swarbrick, 1990)
      - Crisis Presents: The Revolver Romance Special: "The One I Love" (with Glenn Fabry, 1991)
  - For a Few Troubles More (with John McCrea, in #40–43 and 45–46, 1990) collected as For a Few Troubles More (tpb, 48 pages, 1990, ISBN 1-85386-208-8)
    - In 1997, Ennis and McCrea produced the 4-issue limited series Dicks (published by Caliber), which serves as both an adaptation and a sequel to this storyline.
    - After the dissolution of Caliber, the creators moved Dicks to Avatar and produced a few more sequel series.
- 2000 AD (anthology, Fleetway/Rebellion):
  - Time Flies:
    - "Time Flies" (with Philip Bond, in #700–711, 1990)
    - "Tempus Fugitive" (with Philip Bond, Jon Beeston (#1020–1021) and Roger Langridge (#1022–1023), in #1015–1023, 1996)
  - Judge Dredd:
    - Judge Dredd: The Complete Case Files Volume 15 (tpb, 320 pages, 2010, ISBN 1-906735-44-1) includes:
      - "Death Aid" (with Carlos Ezquerra, in #711–715 and 719–720, 1990–1991)
      - "Emerald Isle" (with Steve Dillon, in #727–732, 1991)
      - "Return of the King" (with Carlos Ezquerra, in #733–735, 1991)
    - Judge Dredd: The Complete Case Files Volume 16 (tpb, 320 pages, 2010, ISBN 1-906735-50-6) includes:
      - "Firepower" (with Colin MacNeil, in #736, 1991)
      - "Teddy Bear's Firefight" (with Brian Williamson, in #737, 1991)
      - "Garbage Disposal" (with John Burns, in #738, 1991)
      - "Talkback" (with Glenn Fabry, in #740, 1991)
      - "Twin Blocks" (with Gary Erskine, in #741, 1991)
      - "School Bully" (with Simon Coleby, in #742, 1991)
      - "A Clockwork Pineapple" (with Simon Coleby, in #743–745, 1991)
      - "Muzak Killer" (with Dermot Power, in #746–748, 1991)
      - "The Vidders" (with Chris Weston, in #749, 1991)
      - "Twilight's Last Gleaming" (with John Burns, in #754–756, 1991)
      - "One Better" (with Jose Casanovas, in #757, 1991)
      - "The Flabfighters" (with Simon Coleby, in #758–759, 1991)
      - "Teddy Choppermitz" (with Dermot Power, in #760, 1991)
      - "Rough Guide to Suicide" (with Greg Staples, in #761, 1991)
      - "Justice One" (with Peter Doherty, in #766–771, 1992)
      - "Koole Killers" (with Simon Coleby, in #772–774, 1992)
      - "First of the Many" (with Cliff Robinson, in #775, 1992)
    - Judge Dredd: The Complete Case Files Volume 17 (tpb, 304 pages, 2011, ISBN 1-907519-83-1) includes:
      - "Babes in Arms" (with Greg Staples, in #776–779, 1992)
      - "Almighty Dredd" (with Ian Gibson, in #780–782, 1992)
      - "A Magic Place" (with Steve Dillon (#783) and Simon Coleby, in #783–785, 1992)
      - "Judgement Day" (with Peter Doherty (#786–787, 792–793, 798) and Carlos Ezquerra, in #786–799, 1992)
      - "The Marshall" (with Sean Phillips, in #800–803, 1992)
    - Judge Dredd: The Complete Case Files Volume 18 (tpb, 304 pages, 2011, ISBN 1-907992-25-1) includes:
      - "Innocents Abroad" (with Greg Staples, in #804–807, 1992)
      - "The Magic Mellow Out" (with Anthony Williams, in #808–809, 1992)
      - "Raider" (with John Burns, in #810–814, 1992)
      - "Christmas with Attitude" (with Carlos Ezquerra, in #815, 1992)
      - "The Kinda Dead Man" (with Anthony Williams, in #816, 1993)
      - "The Craftsman" (with John McCrea, in #817, 1993)
      - "Ex-Men" (with John Higgins, in #818, 1993)
      - "Snowstorm" (with Colin MacNeil, in #819, 1993)
      - "PJ and the Mock-Choc Factory" (with Anthony Williams, in #820–822, 1993)
      - "Last Night Out" (with Brett Ewins, in #823, 1993)
      - "A, B, or C Warrior" (with Ron Smith, in #824, 1993)
      - "Blind Mate" (with Greg Staples, in #825, 1993)
      - "Unwelcome Guests" (with Jeff Anderson, in #826, 1993)
      - "Barfur" (with Jon Haward, in #827, 1993)
      - "A Man Called Greener" (with Anthony Williams, in #828, 1993)
    - Judge Dredd: The Complete Case Files Volume 19 (tpb, 320 pages, 2012, ISBN 1-907992-96-0) includes:
      - "Enter: Jonni Kiss" (with Greg Staples, in #830, 1993)
      - "The Judge Who Lives Downstairs" (with Brett Ewins, in #831, 1993)
      - "The Chieftain" (with Mick Austin, in #832–834, 1993)
      - "Muzak Killer: Live!" (with Dermot Power, in #837–839, 1993)
    - "Goodnight Kiss" (with Nick Percival, in #940–948, 1995) collected in Judge Dredd: The Complete Case Files Volume 23 (tpb, 320 pages, 2014, ISBN 1-78108-252-9)
    - "Helter Skelter" (with Carlos Ezquerra and Henry Flint (#1257–1258), in #1250–1261, 2001) collected in Judge Dredd: The Complete Case Files Volume 34 (tpb, 272 pages, 2019, ISBN 1-78108-691-5)
  - Strontium Dogs:
    - "Monsters" (with Steve Pugh, in #750–761, 1991)
    - "Dead Man's Hand" (with Simon Harrison, in Yearbook '93, 1992)
    - "Return of the Gronk" (with Nigel Dobbyn, in #817–824, 1993)
    - "How the Gronk Got His Heartses" (with Nigel Dobbyn, in #850–851, 1993)
    - "The Darkest Star" (with Nigel Dobbyn, in #855–866, 1993)
  - The Corps: "Fireteam One" (with Paul Marshall (#918) and Colin MacNeil, in #918–923, 1994)
  - Tharg the Mighty: "A Night 2 Remember" (one-page sequence with art by Dave Gibbons, in #1280, 2002)
  - Bonjo from Beyond the Stars: "Solids in the Bile Tube" (with Kevin O'Neill, in #2312, 2022)
  - Rogue Trooper:
    - "Blightey Valley" (with Patrick Goddard, in #2326–2335 and 2337–2339, 2023) collected as Rogue Trooper: Blightey Valley (hc, 96 pages, 2024, ISBN 1-83786-195-1)
    - "When a G.I. Dies" (with Patrick Goddard, in #2401–2412, 2024) collected in Rogue Trooper: When a G.I. Dies (hc, 144 pages, 2026, ISBN 1-83786-660-0)
  - Robo-Hunter:
    - "Judge Dredd vs. Robo-Hunter" (with Henry Flint, in #2351, 2023)
    - "You Gotta Be Kidding Me" (with Chris Burnham, in Annual '27, 2026)
  - Strontium Dog: "Doghouse Roses" (with Henry Flint, in #2413, 2024)
  - Fiends of the Western Front: "Red Tide" (with Henry Flint, in #2437, 2025)
- Judge Dredd Megazine (anthology, Fleetway/Rebellion):
  - Chopper:
    - Chopper: Surf's Up (tpb, 304 pages, 2010, ISBN 1-907519-27-0) includes:
      - "Earth, Wind and Fire" (with John McCrea, in #1–6, 1990–1991)
      - "Dead Man's Twist" (with Martin Emond, in vol. 2 #36, 1993)
  - Judge Dredd:
    - Judge Dredd: The Complete Case Files Volume 17 (tpb, 304 pages, 2011, ISBN 1-907519-83-1) includes:
      - "Judgement Day" (with Dean Ormston and Chris Halls (#7), in vol. 2 #4–9, 1992)
      - "The Taking of Sector 123" (with Carlos Ezquerra, in vol. 2 #10–11, 1992)
    - "Monkey on My Back" (with John Higgins, in #204–206, 2003) collected in Judge Dredd: The Complete Case Files Volume 37 (tpb, 288 pages, 2021, ISBN 1-78108-897-7)
    - "Rhinemann Seven" (with Keith Burns, in #486, 2025)
  - Sleeze 'n' Ryder (with Nick Percival, in vol. 2 #19–26, 1993)
- The Comic Relief Comic (among other writers and artists, one-shot, Fleetway, 1991)
- Judge Dredd Yearbook '93: "When Irish Pies are Smiling!" (with Steve Dillon, co-feature, Fleetway, 1992)
- A1 #6: "And They'd Never Get Drunk but Stay Sober" (with Steve Dillon, anthology, Atomeka, 1992)
- The Worm: "Chapter 4: In the End There Was the Worm Again" (scripted by Ennis from a storyline by Alan Moore, art by Phil Gascoine, Davey Jones, Bill Greenhead, Martin Griffiths, Graham Manley, Duncan Fegredo, Colin Wyatt, John McCrea, Ian Gibson, Andrew Wildman, Charlie Adlard, John Erasmus, Pete McGeough, Paul Hardman, Mike Searle, Paul Brown, Richard Weston, Nick Abadzis, Gerry Dolan, Jim Baikie, Ted Dewan, Lee Barnard, Nick Grant, Mark Buckingham, Barrie Mitchell and Steve Marchant, anthology graphic novel, 64 pages, Slab-O-Concrete, 1999, ISBN 1-899866-37-X)
- Tales of Midnight: Kosovo Refugee Benefit Special: "Such a Perfect Day" (with Dave Gibbons, co-feature, Blue Silver Entertainment, 1999)
- Red Horse (with Frank Victoria, an 8-page digital comic published via the Electricomics app, 2015)
- Johnny Red (with Keith Burns):
  - Johnny Red #1–8 (Titan, 2015–2016) collected as Johnny Red: The Hurricane (tpb, 208 pages, 2016, ISBN 1-7827-6185-3; hc, Rebellion, 2025, ISBN 1-8378-6420-9)
  - Battle Action (anthology, Rebellion):
    - Battle Action Special: "Johnny Red v. Skreamer of the Stukas" (co-feature in the graphic novel, 96 pages, 2022, ISBN 1-7861-8673-X)
    - Battle Action vol. 2 #1: "The Falcon" (2023) collected in Battle Action Volume 2 (hc, 192 pages, 2024, ISBN 1-8378-6096-3)
    - Battle Action vol. 3 #1–10: "A Couple of Heroes" (2024–2025) collected as Johnny Red: A Couple of Heroes (hc, 192 pages, 2026, ISBN 1-8378-6657-0)
- Hellman of Hammer Force (with Mike Dorey):
  - Action Special 2020: "At the Twilight of the Reich" (co-feature, Rebellion, 2020) сollected in Battle Action Volume 2 (hc, 192 pages, 2024, ISBN 1-8378-6096-3)
  - Battle Action (anthology, Rebellion):
    - Battle Action Special: "Hellman v. Glory Rider" (co-feature in the graphic novel, 96 pages, 2022, ISBN 1-7861-8673-X)
    - Battle Action vol. 2 #5: "Hellman of the Condor Legion" (2023) collected in Battle Action Volume 2 (hc, 192 pages, 2024, ISBN 1-8378-6096-3)
    - Battle Action vol. 3 #6: "A Walk in the Woods" (2025) collected in Battle Action Volume 3 (hc, 144 pages, 2025, ISBN 1-8378-6544-2)
  - Action 50th Anniversary Special: "A Winter's Tale" (co-feature, Rebellion, 2026)
- Battle of Britain Special: "The Tough Way Out" (with Keith Burns, co-feature, Rebellion, 2020) сollected in Battle Action Volume 2 (hc, 192 pages, 2024, ISBN 1-8378-6096-3)
- The Most Important Comic Book on Earth: "Rover Red Charlie" (with Michael DiPascale, anthology graphic novel, 352 pages, DK Publishing, 2021, ISBN 0-7440-4282-8)
- Hawk the Slayer #1–5 (with Henry Flint, Rebellion, 2022) collected as Hawk the Slayer: Watch for Me in the Night (tpb, 144 pages, 2023, ISBN 1-7861-8777-9)
- Battle Action (anthology, Rebellion):
  - Battle Action Special (graphic novel, 96 pages, 2022, ISBN 1-7861-8673-X)
    - In addition to "Johnny Red" and "Hellman" co-features listed above, this release included several more short stories written by Ennis:
      - "The Sarge" (with P. J. Holden)
      - "Crazy Keller" (with Chris Burnham)
        - Another Crazy Keller short story, written by Ennis and drawn by Burnham, was published in Battle Action vol. 2 #2 (2023)
        - The short story from Battle Action vol. 2 #2 was collected in Battle Action Volume 2 (hc, 192 pages, 2024, ISBN 1-8378-6096-3)
      - "Dredger" (with John Higgins)
        - Three more Dredger short stories, written by Ennis and drawn by Higgins, were published in the revived Battle Action series:
          - Battle Action vol. 2 #3: "O Mother, Where Art Thou?" (2023) collected in Battle Action Volume 2 (hc, 192 pages, 2024, ISBN 1-8378-6096-3)
          - Battle Action vol. 3 #9: "Motherhood of the Wolf" (2025) collected in Battle Action Volume 3 (hc, 144 pages, 2025, ISBN 1-8378-6544-2)
          - Action 50th Anniversary Special: "After the Action" (co-feature, 2026)
      - "Kids Rule O.K." (with Kevin O'Neill)
      - "Nina Petrova and the Angels of Death" (with Patrick Goddard)
  - Battle Action vol. 2 #4: "Cooley's Gun" (with Staz Johnson, 2023) collected in Battle Action Volume 2 (hc, 192 pages, 2024, ISBN 1-8378-6096-3)

=== DC Comics ===
- Hellblazer (with Will Simpson, Mike Hoffman (#48), Steve Dillon, David Lloyd (#56) and Peter Snejbjerg (#77); published under the Vertigo imprint starting with issue #63, 1991–1994) collected as:
  - John Constantine, Hellblazer Volume 5 (includes #41–46, tpb, 352 pages, 2013, ISBN 1-4012-3802-5)
  - John Constantine, Hellblazer Volume 6 (includes #47–50 and 52–61, tpb, 400 pages, 2013, ISBN 1-4012-4043-7)
  - John Constantine, Hellblazer Volume 7 (collects #62–71, tpb, 320 pages, 2014, ISBN 1-4012-4303-7)
    - Includes Hellblazer Special (written by Ennis, art by Steve Dillon, Vertigo, 1993)
    - Includes the "Tainted Love" short story (art by Steve Dillon) from Vertigo Jam (anthology one-shot, 1993)
  - John Constantine, Hellblazer Volume 8 (collects #72–83, tpb, 384 pages, 2014, ISBN 1-4012-4749-0)
    - Includes the Heartland one-shot (written by Ennis, art by Steve Dillon, Vertigo, 1997)
- The Demon vol. 3 (with John McCrea, Denis Rodier (#46), Nigel Dobbyn (#49), Peter Snejbjerg (#50) and Chris Alexander (#51), 1993–1995) collected as:
  - Hell's Hitman (collects #40, 42–49 and Annual #2, tpb, 296 pages, 2015, ISBN 1-4012-5821-2)
  - The Longest Day (collects #0 and 50–58, tpb, 288 pages, 2016, ISBN 1-4012-6099-3)
- Hitman:
  - Hitman (with John McCrea, Carlos Ezquerra (Annual) and Steve Pugh (Annual and #21), 1996–2001) collected as:
    - A Rage in Arkham (collects #1–3 and The Demon vol. 3 Annual #2, tpb, 144 pages, 2009, ISBN 1-56389-314-2)
      - Includes the "Hitman" short story (art by John McCrea) from The Batman Chronicles #4 (anthology, 1996)
    - Ten Thousand Bullets (collects #4–8 and Annual #1, tpb, 176 pages, 2010, ISBN 1-4012-1842-3)
    - Local Heroes (collects #9–14, tpb, 144 pages, 2010, ISBN 1-4012-2893-3)
    - Ace of Killers (collects #15–22, tpb, 192 pages, 2011, ISBN 1-4012-3004-0)
    - Tommy's Heroes (collects #23–36 and 1,000,000, tpb, 352 pages, 2011, ISBN 1-4012-3118-7)
    - For Tomorrow (collects #37–50, tpb, 336 pages, 2012, ISBN 1-4012-3282-5)
    - Closing Time (includes #51–60, tpb, 384 pages, 2012, ISBN 1-4012-3400-3)
      - Includes the "How to Be a Super-Hero!" short story (art by Nelson DeCastro) from Superman 80-Page Giant #1 (anthology, 1999)
      - Includes the Hitman/Lobo: That Stupid Bastich! one-shot (written by Ennis, art by Doug Mahnke, 2000)
      - Includes the 2-issue limited series JLA/Hitman (written by Ennis, art by John McCrea, 2007)
    - Omnibus Volume 1 (collects #1–33, Annual #1, short story from The Batman Chronicles #4 and The Demon vol. 3 Annual #2, hc, 1,136 pages, 2024, ISBN 1-77952-590-7)
    - Omnibus Volume 2 (includes #34–60, 1,000,000, short story from Superman 80-Page Giant #1, Hitman/Lobo and JLA/Hitman #1–2, hc, 1,144 pages, 2025, ISBN 1-7995-0335-6)
  - Hitman Omnibus Volume 2 (hc, 1,144 pages, 2025, ISBN 1-7995-0335-6) includes:
    - DC Sneak Peek: All-Star Section Eight (with John McCrea, digital one-shot, 2015) also collected in All-Star Section Eight (tpb, 144 pages, 2016, ISBN 1-40126-326-7)
    - All-Star Section Eight #1–6 (with John McCrea, 2015–2016) also collected as All-Star Section Eight (tpb, 144 pages, 2016, ISBN 1-40126-326-7)
    - Sixpack and Dogwelder: Hard-Travelin' Heroz #1–6 (with Russ Braun, 2016–2017) also collected as Sixpack and Dogwelder: Hard-Travelin' Heroz (tpb, 144 pages, 2017, ISBN 1-40126-813-7)
    - DC: The Doomed and the Damned: "Baytor vs. Darkseid" (with P. J. Holden, anthology one-shot, 2020)
    - "Better to Serve" (with John McCrea — new story created for this collected edition)
  - Hitman: It Was the Nineties (with John McCrea, one-shot, 2027)
- Bloody Mary #1–4 and Bloody Mary: Lady Liberty #1–4 (with Carlos Ezquerra, Helix, 1996–1997)
  - Collected by Vertigo as Bloody Mary (tpb, 192 pages, 2005, ISBN 1-4012-0725-1)
  - Collected by Image as Bloody Mary (tpb, 192 pages, 2016, ISBN 1-6321-5761-6)
- Batman:
  - Batman: Legends of the Dark Knight #91–93: "Freakout" (with Will Simpson, anthology, 1997)
  - Dark Nights: Death Metal — Legends of the Dark Knights: "I Shall Become..." (with Joëlle Jones, anthology one-shot, 2020)
    - Collected in Dark Nights: Death Metal — The Darkest Knight (tpb, 216 pages, 2021, ISBN 1-77950-792-5)
    - Collected in Dark Nights: Death Metal Omnibus (hc, 968 pages, 2024, ISBN 1-7795-2307-6)
  - Batman: Reptilian #1–6 (with Liam Sharp, DC Black Label, 2021) collected as Batman: Reptilian (hc, 160 pages, 2022, ISBN 1-7795-1533-2; tpb, 2023, ISBN 1-7795-2006-9)
- Enemy Ace: War in Heaven #1–2 (with Chris Weston (#1) and Russ Heath (#2), 2001) collected as Enemy Ace: War in Heaven (tpb, 128 pages, 2003, ISBN 1-56389-982-5)
- Dastardly and Muttley #1–6 (with Alain Mauricet, Hanna-Barbera Beyond, 2017–2018), collected as Dastardly and Muttley (tpb, 160 pages, 2018, ISBN 1-40127-461-7)
- Peacemaker: Disturbing the Peace (with Garry Brown, one-shot, DC Black Label, 2022)

==== Vertigo ====
- Preacher (with Steve Dillon, 1995–2000) collected as:
  - Book One (collects #1–12, hc, 352 pages, 2009, ISBN 1-4012-2279-X; tpb, 2013, ISBN 1-4012-4045-3)
  - Book Two (collects #13–26, hc, 368 pages, 2010, ISBN 1-4012-2579-9; tpb, 2013, ISBN 1-4012-4255-3)
  - Book Three (collects #27–33, hc, 352 pages, 2010, ISBN 1-4012-3016-4; tpb, 2013, ISBN 1-4012-4501-3)
    - Includes the 4-issue limited series Preacher Special: Saint of Killers (written by Ennis, art by Steve Pugh and Carlos Ezquerra (#3), 1996)
    - Includes the Preacher Special: Cassidy — Blood and Whiskey one-shot (written by Ennis, art by Steve Dillon, 1998)
  - Book Four (collects #34–40, hc, 368 pages, 2011, ISBN 1-4012-3093-8; tpb, 2014, ISBN 1-4012-3094-6)
    - Includes the Preacher Special: The Story of You-Know-Who one-shot (written by Ennis, art by Richard Case, 1996)
    - Includes the Preacher Special: The Good Old Boys one-shot (written by Ennis, art by Carlos Ezquerra, 1997)
    - Includes the Preacher Special: One Man's War one-shot (written by Ennis, art by Peter Snejbjerg, 1998)
  - Book Five (collects #41–54, hc, 368 pages, 2011, ISBN 1-4012-3250-7; tpb, 2014, ISBN 1-4012-5074-2)
  - Book Six (collects #55–66, hc, 384 pages, 2012, ISBN 1-4012-3415-1; tpb, 2013, ISBN 1-4012-5279-6)
    - Includes the Preacher Special: Tall in the Saddle one-shot (written by Ennis, art by Steve Dillon, 2000)
  - Absolute Edition Volume 1 (collects #1–26, hc, 736 pages, 2016, ISBN 1-4012-6441-7)
  - Absolute Edition Volume 2 (collects #27–40 and all Preacher Specials except for Tall in the Saddle, hc, 720 pages, 2017, ISBN 1-4012-6809-9)
  - Absolute Edition Volume 3 (collects #41–66 and the Preacher Special: Tall in the Saddle one-shot, hc, 736 pages, 2018, ISBN 1-4012-7848-5)
  - The 25th Anniversary Omnibus Volume 1 (collects #1–33, Saint of Killers #1–4 and Cassidy — Blood and Whiskey, hc, 1,080 pages, DC Black Label, 2020, ISBN 1-7795-0267-2)
  - The 25th Anniversary Omnibus Volume 2 (collects #34–66, The Story of You-Know-Who, The Good Old Boys, One Man's War and Tall in the Saddle, hc, 1,104 pages, DC Black Label, 2021, ISBN 1-7795-1037-3)
- Goddess #1–8 (with Phil Winslade, 1995–1996) collected as Goddess (tpb, 256 pages, 2002, ISBN 1-56389-735-0)
- Loaded (prose story with illustrations by Greg Staples, promotional one-shot polybagged with Preacher #12 and The Invisibles #19, 1996)
- Unknown Soldier vol. 3 #1–4 (with Kilian Plunkett, 1997) collected as Unknown Soldier (tpb, 112 pages, 1998, ISBN 1-56389-422-X)
- Pride and Joy #1–4 (with John Higgins, 1997)
  - Collected by Vertigo as Pride and Joy (tpb, 104 pages, 2004, ISBN 1-4012-0190-3)
  - Collected by Image as Pride and Joy (tpb, 104 pages, 2016, ISBN 1-6321-5801-9)
- Hellblazer:
  - Hellblazer #129–133: "Son of Man" (with John Higgins, 1998–1999) collected in John Constantine, Hellblazer Volume 12 (tpb, 304 pages, 2016, ISBN 1-4012-5810-7)
  - Vertigo: Winter's Edge #2: "All Those Little Girls and Boys" (with Glyn Dillon, anthology, 1999) collected in John Constantine, Hellblazer Volume 13 (tpb, 336 pages, 2016, ISBN 1-4012-6141-8)
- Flinch #3: "Satanic" (with Kieron Dwyer, anthology, 1999) collected in Flinch Book One (tpb, 192 pages, 2015, ISBN 1-4012-5812-3)
- Weird War Tales Special: "Nosh and Barry and Eddie and Joe" (with Jim Lee, anthology one-shot, 2000)
- Adventures in the Rifle Brigade #1–3 and Adventures in the Rifle Brigade: Operation Bollock #1–3 (with Carlos Ezquerra, 2000–2002)
  - Collected by Vertigo as Adventures in the Rifle Brigade (tpb, 144 pages, 2005, ISBN 1-4012-0353-1)
  - Collected by Image as Adventures in the Rifle Brigade (tpb, 144 pages, 2016, ISBN 1-6321-5802-7)
- War Stories (series of unconnected one-off stories themed around war):
  - Volume 1 (tpb, 240 pages, 2004, ISBN 1-84023-912-3) collects:
    - War Story: Johann's Tiger (with Chris Weston, one-shot, 2001)
    - War Story: D-Day Dodgers (with John Higgins, one-shot, 2001)
    - War Story: Screaming Eagles (with Dave Gibbons, one-shot, 2002)
    - War Story: Nightingale (with David Lloyd, one-shot, 2002)
  - Volume 2 (tpb, 240 pages, 2006, ISBN 1-4012-1039-2) collects:
    - War Story: The Reivers (with Cam Kennedy, one-shot, 2003)
    - War Story: J for Jenny (with David Lloyd, one-shot, 2003)
    - War Story: Condors (with Carlos Ezquerra, one-shot, 2003)
    - War Story: Archangel (with Gary Erskine, one-shot, 2003)
  - The cycle was continued under Avatar as War Stories #1–26 (2014–2018)
- City Lights (with Steve Dillon, unreleased limited series — initially announced in 2003)

==== Wildstorm ====
- The Authority Omnibus Volume 2 (hc, 1,600 pages, 2025, ISBN 1-799502-25-2) includes:
  - The Authority: Kev (with Glenn Fabry, one-shot, Eye of the Storm, 2002) also collected in The Authority: Kev (tpb, 144 pages, 2005, ISBN 1-4012-0614-X)
  - The Authority: More Kev #1–4 (with Glenn Fabry, 2004) also collected in The Authority: Kev (tpb, 144 pages, 2005, ISBN 1-4012-0614-X)
  - The Authority: The Magnificent Kevin #1–5 (with Carlos Ezquerra, 2005–2006) also collected as The Authority: The Magnificent Kevin (tpb, 112 pages, 2006, ISBN 1-4012-0990-4)
  - A Man Called Kev #1–5 (with Carlos Ezquerra, 2006–2007) also collected as A Man Called Kev (tpb, 112 pages, 2007, ISBN 1-4012-1324-3)
- Battler Britton #1–5 (with Colin Wilson, 2006–2007)
  - Collected for the US market as Battler Britton: Bloody Good Show (tpb, 120 pages, 2007, ISBN 1-4012-1378-2)
  - Collected for the UK market as Battler Britton: Bloody Good Show (hc, 128 pages, Rebellion, 2026, ISBN 1-8378-6760-7)
- The Boys #1–6 (with Darick Robertson, 2006–2007)
  - Issues #7–10 were solicited before the series was cancelled by DC Comics.
  - Several months after the cancellation, the series resumed publication under Dynamite.
- Midnighter #1–6 (with Chris Sprouse and Glenn Fabry (#6), 2007)
  - Collected as Midnighter: Killing Machine (tpb, 144 pages, 2007, ISBN 1-4012-1477-0)
  - Collected in Midnighter: The Complete Wildstorm Series (tpb, 512 pages, DC Comics, 2017, ISBN 1-4012-6791-2)
- Ex Machina #40: "Ruthless" (with Jim Lee, two-page sequence at the end of the issue, 2009)
  - Collected in Ex Machina Book Four (hc, 272 pages, 2010, ISBN 1-4012-2845-3; tpb, 2015, ISBN 1-4012-5002-5)
  - Collected in Ex Machina: The Complete Series Omnibus (hc, 1,440 pages, Vertigo, 2018, ISBN 1-4012-8068-4)

=== Marvel Comics ===
- Punisher:
  - Marvel Knights: Punisher by Garth Ennis — The Complete Collection Volume 1 (tpb, 456 pages, 2018, ISBN 1-3029-1408-1) includes:
    - Punisher Kills the Marvel Universe (with Doug Braithwaite, one-shot, Alterniverse, 1995)
      - Also collected in The Punisher by Garth Ennis Omnibus (hc, 1,136 pages, 2008, ISBN 0-7851-3383-6)
      - Also collected in The Punisher vs. the Marvel Universe (tpb, 456 pages, 2016, ISBN 0-7851-9554-8)
    - The Punisher vol. 5 #1–12 (with Steve Dillon, Marvel Knights, 2000–2001)
      - Also collected as The Punisher: Welcome Back, Frank (hc, 288 pages, 2008, ISBN 0-7851-3384-4; tpb, 2011, ISBN 0-7851-5716-6)
      - Also collected in The Punisher by Garth Ennis Omnibus (hc, 1,136 pages, 2008, ISBN 0-7851-3383-6)
  - The Punisher/Painkiller Jane (with Joe Jusko and David Ross, one-shot, Marvel Knights, 2001)
  - The Punisher vol. 6 (with Steve Dillon, Darick Robertson (#15–17), Tom Mandrake (#24–27), Cam Kennedy (#28–31) and John McCrea (#33–37), Marvel Knights, 2001–2004) collected as:
    - Marvel Knights: Punisher by Garth Ennis — The Complete Collection Volume 1 (includes #1–5, tpb, 456 pages, 2018, ISBN 1-3029-1408-1)
    - Marvel Knights: Punisher by Garth Ennis — The Complete Collection Volume 2 (includes #6 and 13–26, tpb, 424 pages, 2019, ISBN 1-3029-1607-6)
      - Includes the "Roots" short story (art by Joe Quesada) from Marvel Knights Double Shot #1 (anthology, 2002)
      - Also collects The Punisher vol. 6 #7 (written and drawn by Steve Dillon, 2002)
    - Marvel Knights: Punisher by Garth Ennis — The Complete Collection Volume 3 (includes #27–37, tpb, 400 pages, 2019, ISBN 1-30291-865-6)
    - The Punisher by Garth Ennis Omnibus (includes #1–7, 13–37 and the short story from Marvel Knights Double Shot #1, hc, 1,136 pages, 2008, ISBN 0-7851-3383-6)
  - Born #1–4 (with Darick Robertson, Marvel MAX, 2003) collected as The Punisher: Born (hc, 112 pages, 2004, ISBN 0-7851-1231-6; tpb, 2004, ISBN 0-7851-1025-9)
  - The Punisher vol. 7 (with Lewis LaRosa (#1–6), Leandro Fernández, Doug Braithwaite (#13–18), Goran Parlov, Lan Medina (#43–49) and Howard Chaykin (#50), Marvel MAX, 2004–2008) collected as:
    - Punisher MAX: The Complete Collection Volume 1 (collects #1–12 and Born #1–4, tpb, 424 pages, 2016, ISBN 1-3029-0015-3)
    - Punisher MAX: The Complete Collection Volume 2 (collects #13–30, tpb, 440 pages, 2016, ISBN 1-3029-0016-1)
    - Punisher MAX: The Complete Collection Volume 3 (collects #31–49, tpb, 456 pages, 2016, ISBN 1-3029-0187-7)
    - Punisher MAX: The Complete Collection Volume 4 (includes #50–60, tpb, 544 pages, 2016, ISBN 1-3029-0244-X)
      - Also collects the 5-issue limited series The Punisher Presents: Barracuda (written by Ennis, art by Goran Parlov, Marvel MAX, 2007)
      - Also collects The Punisher: The Tyger one-shot (written by Ennis, art by John Severin, Marvel MAX, 2006)
      - Also collects The Punisher: The Cell one-shot (written by Ennis, art by Lewis LaRosa, Marvel MAX, 2005)
      - Also collects The Punisher: The End one-shot (written by Ennis, art by Richard Corben, Marvel MAX, 2004)
    - Punisher MAX by Garth Ennis Omnibus Volume 1 (collects #1–30 and Born #1–4, hc, 864 pages, 2018, ISBN 1-3029-1207-0)
    - Punisher MAX by Garth Ennis Omnibus Volume 2 (collects #31–60, Barracuda #1–5 and the one-shots, hc, 1,008 pages, 2018, ISBN 1-3029-1206-2)
  - The Punisher: Countdown (with Steve Dillon, promotional one-shot serving as a prequel to The Punisher — distributed with the first DVD release of the film, 2004)
  - The Punisher: War Zone vol. 2 #1–6 (with Steve Dillon, Marvel Knights, 2009)
    - Collected as The Punisher: War Zone — The Resurrection of Ma Gnucci (hc, 144 pages, 2009, ISBN 0-7851-3822-6; tpb, 2009, ISBN 0-7851-3260-0)
    - Collected in Marvel Knights: Punisher by Garth Ennis — The Complete Collection Volume 3 (tpb, 400 pages, 2019, ISBN 1-30291-865-6)
  - Punisher and Fury MAX by Garth Ennis Omnibus (hc, 712 pages, 2026, ISBN 1-3029-6782-7) includes:
    - Punisher: The Platoon #1–6 (with Goran Parlov, Marvel MAX, 2017–2018) also collected as Punisher: The Platoon (tpb, 136 pages, 2018, ISBN 0-7851-9018-X)
    - Punisher: Soviet #1–6 (with Jacen Burrows, Marvel MAX, 2020) also collected as Punisher: Soviet (tpb, 136 pages, 2020, ISBN 1-30291-341-7)
  - Marvel Zombies: Black, White and Blood #1: "Undefeated" (with Rachael Stott, anthology, 2023)
    - Collected in an oversized format in Marvel Zombies: Black, White and Blood — Treasury Edition (tpb, 136 pages, 2024, ISBN 1-3029-5717-1)
    - Collected in a regular-sized edition in Marvel Zombies: Black, White and Blood (tpb, 136 pages, 2025, ISBN 1-3029-5718-X)
  - Marvel: Black, White and Blood and Guts #2: "And None Shall Walk Away" (with John McCrea, anthology, 2026) collected in Marvel: Black, White and Blood and Guts (tpb, 136 pages, 2026, ISBN 1-302967-27-4)
    - An oversized format collection was solicited for a 2026 release but subsequently cancelled: Marvel: Black, White and Blood and Guts — Treasury Edition (tpb, 136 pages, ISBN 1-3029-6830-0)
- Hulk Smash #1–2 (with John McCrea, Marvel Knights, 2001)
  - Collected in The Incredible Hulk: Dead Like Me (tpb, 144 pages, 2004, ISBN 0-7851-1399-1)
  - Collected in Hulk: The Dogs of War (hc, 832 pages, 2019, ISBN 1-30291-594-0)
- Tangled Web #1–3: "The Coming of the Thousand" (with John McCrea, anthology, 2001)
  - Collected in Spider-Man's Tangled Web Volume 1 (tpb, 144 pages, 2002, ISBN 0-7851-0803-3)
  - Collected in Spider-Man's Tangled Web Omnibus (hc, 560 pages, 2017, ISBN 1-302-90682-8)
- Nick Fury:
  - Fury #1–6 (with Darick Robertson, Marvel MAX, 2001–2002) collected as Fury (tpb, 144 pages, 2002, ISBN 0-7851-0878-5)
  - Fury: Peacemaker #1–6 (with Darick Robertson, Marvel Knights, 2006) collected as Fury: Peacemaker (tpb, 144 pages, 2006, ISBN 0-7851-1769-5)
  - Punisher and Fury MAX by Garth Ennis Omnibus (hc, 712 pages, 2026, ISBN 1-3029-6782-7) includes:
    - Fury MAX #1–13 (with Goran Parlov, 2012–2013) also collected as Fury MAX: My War Gone by (hc, 312 pages, 2014, ISBN 0-7851-9038-4)
    - Get Fury #1–6 (with Jacen Burrows, Marvel MAX, 2024) also collected as Get Fury (tpb, 136 pages, 2024, ISBN 1-3029-1254-2)
- Thor: Vikings #1–5 (with Glenn Fabry, Marvel MAX, 2003–2004) collected as Thor: Vikings (tpb, 128 pages, 2004, ISBN 0-7851-1175-1)
- Ghost Rider (with Clayton Crain):
  - Ghost Rider vol. 4 #1–6 (Marvel Knights, 2005–2006) collected as Ghost Rider: The Road to Damnation (hc, 144 pages, 2006, ISBN 0-7851-1592-7; tpb, 2007, ISBN 0-7851-2122-6)
  - Ghost Rider: Trail of Tears #1–6 (2007) collected as Ghost Rider: Trail of Tears (hc, 144 pages, 2007, ISBN 0-7851-2003-3; tpb, 2008, ISBN 0-7851-2004-1)
- Phantom Eagle:
  - War is Hell: The First Flight of the Phantom Eagle #1–5 (with Howard Chaykin, Marvel MAX, 2008)
    - Collected as War is Hell: The First Flight of the Phantom Eagle (hc, 120 pages, 2008, ISBN 0-7851-1643-5; tpb, 2009, ISBN 0-7851-3224-4)
    - Collected in Lost Marvels Volume 2 (Howard Chaykin Volume 1) (hc, 256 pages, Fantagraphics, 2025, ISBN 979-8875000362)
  - Secret Wars: Where Monsters Dwell #1–5 (with Russ Braun, 2015)
    - Collected as Secret Wars — Warzones: Where Monsters Dwell (tpb, 112 pages, 2016, ISBN 0-7851-9892-X)
    - Collected in Secret Wars: Battleworld Omnibus Volume 4 (hc, 1,280 pages, 2027, ISBN 1-3029-7179-4)

=== Image Comics ===
- Top Cow:
  - Medieval Spawn/Witchblade #1–3 (with Brandon Peterson, 1996) collected as Medieval Spawn/Witchblade (tpb, 96 pages, 1997, ISBN 1-887279-44-X)
  - The Darkness (with Marc Silvestri and Joe Benitez (#11–14); issues #11–14 are co-written by Ennis and Malachy Coney, 1996–1998) collected as:
    - Coming of Age (collects #1–6, tpb, 176 pages, 2001, ISBN 1-58240-032-6)
    - Heart of Darkness (includes #11–14, tpb, 144 pages, 2001, ISBN 1-58240-205-1)
    - Compendium Volume 1 (includes #1–6 and 11–14, tpb, 1,248 pages, 2006, ISBN 1-5824-0643-X)
- The Pro (with Amanda Conner, graphic novel, 60 pages, 2002, ISBN 1-58240-275-2)
  - "The Pro vs. The Ho", a short story written by Ennis and drawn by Conner, was first published in The Pro: Oversized Edition (hc, 72 pages, 2004, ISBN 1-58240-383-X)
  - Another short story featuring The Pro, "Back in Business" (co-written by Jimmy Palmiotti with Conner and drawn by Conner) was published in Image! #6 (anthology, 2022)
- Back to Brooklyn #1–5 (co-written by Ennis and Jimmy Palmiotti, art by Mihailo Vukelic, 2008–2009) collected as Back to Brooklyn (tpb, 128 pages, 2009, ISBN 1-60706-060-4)
- Creepshow vol. 2 #1: "Make Your Choice" (with Becky Cloonan, anthology, Skybound, 2023)
  - Collected in Creepshow Volume 2 (tpb, 128 pages, 2024, ISBN 1-5343-9768-X)
  - Collected in Creepshow Book One (hc, 256 pages, 2024, ISBN 1-5343-5616-9)
- Ninth Circle:
  - Freddie the Fix (with Mike Perkins, one-shot, 2024)
  - The Kids (with Dalibor Talajić, one-shot, 2025)

=== Avatar Press ===
- Dicks (with John McCrea):
  - Bigger Dicks #1–4 (2002) collected as Dicks by Garth Ennis and John McCrea (tpb, 176 pages, 2003, ISBN 1-59291-004-1)
    - The series serves as both an adaptation and a sequel to the story "For a Few Troubles More", originally published in the UK anthology magazine Crisis in 1990.
    - The series consists of issue-by-issue reprints of Dicks #1–4 (published by Caliber in 1997) with new additional material created by Ennis and McCrea for this edition.
    - A colorized version of the series was published by Avatar as Dicks vol. 2 #1–4 (2012)
    - The colorized version was collected as Dicks Volume 1 (tpb, 176 pages, 2012, ISBN 1-5929-1173-0)
  - Dicks 2 #1–4 (2002–2003)
    - A colorized version of the series was published by Avatar as Dicks vol. 2 #5–8 (2012)
    - The colorized version was collected in Dicks Volume 2 (tpb, 176 pages, 2013, ISBN 1-5929-1190-0)
  - Dicks X-Mas Special (2003) and Dicks Winter Special (2005)
    - The colorized versions of the two specials were published by Avatar as Dicks vol. 2 #9–10 (2012)
    - The colorized versions were collected in Dicks Volume 2 (tpb, 176 pages, 2013, ISBN 1-5929-1190-0)
  - Dicks: End of Time #1–6 (2014) collected as Dicks Volume 3 (tpb, 144 pages, 2015, ISBN 1-5929-1258-3)
- 303 #1–6 (with Jacen Burrows, 2004–2005) collected as 303 (tpb, 144 pages, 2007, ISBN 1-59291-037-8)
- Chronicles of Wormwood:
  - Chronicles of Wormwood #1–6 (with Jacen Burrows, 2007) collected as Chronicles of Wormwood (hc, 144 pages, 2007, ISBN 1-5929-1042-4; tpb, 2007, ISBN 1-59291-041-6)
  - Chronicles of Wormwood: The Last Enemy (with Rob Steen, graphic novel, 48 pages, 2007, ISBN 1-59291-043-2)
  - Chronicles of Wormwood: The Last Battle #1–6 (with Óscar Jiménez, 2009–2011) collected as Chronicles of Wormwood: The Last Battle (hc, 160 pages, 2011, ISBN 1-5929-1104-8; tpb, 2011, ISBN 1-59291-103-X)
- Streets of Glory #1–6 (with Mike Wolfer, 2007–2008) collected as Streets of Glory (hc, 160 pages, 2009, ISBN 1-59291-065-3; tpb, 2009, ISBN 1-59291-064-5)
- Crossed:
  - Crossed #0–9 (with Jacen Burrows, 2008–2010) collected as Crossed (hc, 240 pages, 2010, ISBN 1-59291-091-2; tpb, 2010, ISBN 1-59291-090-4)
  - Crossed: Badlands (anthology):
    - "Badlands" (with Jacen Burrows, in #1–3, 2012) collected in Crossed Volume 4 (hc, 240 pages, 2012, ISBN 1-59291-175-7; tpb, 2012, ISBN 1-59291-174-9)
    - "The Fatal Englishman" (with Raulo Cáceres, in #25–28, 2013) collected in Crossed Volume 6 (tpb, 256 pages, 2013, ISBN 1-5929-1206-0)
    - "The Thin Red Line" (with Christian Zanier, in #50–56, 2014) collected as Crossed Volume 10 (tpb, 176 pages, 2014, ISBN 1-59291-242-7)
  - Crossed: Dead or Alive #1–12 (with Daniel Gete, a webcomic serialized at crossedcomic.com between 13 November 2014 and 15 February 2015)
- Stitched #1–7 (adaptation of Ennis' screenplay — written and drawn by Mike Wolfer, 2011–2012) collected as Stitched Volume 1 (hc, 176 pages, 2012, ISBN 1-5929-1181-1; tpb, 2012, ISBN 1-5929-1180-3)
  - Wolfer continued writing the series with an original storyline; all further issues were drawn by Fernando Heinz Furukawa and collected as:
    - Stitched Volume 2 (collects #8–13, tpb, 160 pages, 2013, ISBN 1-5929-1193-5)
    - Stitched Volume 3 (collects #14–19, tpb, 176 pages, 2014, ISBN 1-5929-1225-7)
  - Several years later, Avatar published a 3-issue sequel limited series titled Stitched: Terror (written by Pat Shand, drawn by Daniel Gete, 2019)
- Rover Red Charlie #1–6 (with Michael DiPascale, 2013–2014) collected as Rover Red Charlie (tpb, 160 pages, 2014, ISBN 1-5929-1239-7)
- Caliban #1–7 (with Facundo Percio, 2014) collected as Caliban (tpb, 176 pages, 2015, ISBN 1-5929-1250-8)
- War Stories #1–26 (with Matt Martin (#1), Keith Burns (#2–3) and Tomas Aira, 2014–2018)
  - The series continues the War Stories cycle of one-shots published under Vertigo between 2001 and 2003; those stories were reprinted by Avatar as:
    - War Stories Volume 1 (collects Johann's Tiger, D-Day Dodgers, Screaming Eagles and Nightingale, tpb, 240 pages, 2015, ISBN 1-5929-1238-9)
    - War Stories Volume 2 (collects The Reivers, J for Jenny, Condors and Archangel, tpb, 240 pages, 2015, ISBN 1-592-91241-9)
  - The Avatar series had been partially collected in two volumes:
    - War Stories Volume 3 (collects #1–9, tpb, 224 pages, 2016, ISBN 1-5929-1272-9)
    - War Stories Volume 4 (collects #10–15, tpb, 144 pages, 2016, ISBN 15929-1277-X)
  - Another volume was solicited for a 2017 release but subsequently cancelled: War Stories Volume 5 (tpb, 144 pages, ISBN 1-5929-1286-9)
- Code Pru (with Raulo Cáceres):
  - Code Pru #1–2: "What's Past is Prulogue" (2015–2016)
  - Alan Moore's Cinema Purgatorio #1–18: "Code Pru" (anthology, 2016–2019)

=== Dynamite Entertainment ===
- The Boys:
  - The Boys (with Darick Robertson, Peter Snejbjerg (#13–14), John Higgins (#26 and 28), Carlos Ezquerra (#31–32, 34), John McCrea + Keith Burns (#33, 39, 52–55, 65) and Russ Braun, 2007–2012) collected as:
    - Volume 1 (collects #1–14, Definitive Edition (hc), 368 pages, 2008, ISBN 1-9333-0580-0; Omnibus (tpb), 2019, ISBN 1-5241-0859-6)
      - Includes the untitled 4-page short story (art by Darick Robertson) from Liberty Comics #1 (anthology, Image, 2008)
    - Volume 2 (collects #15–30, Definitive Edition (hc), 376 pages, 2009, ISBN 1-6069-0073-0; Omnibus (tpb), 2019, ISBN 1-5241-0970-3)
    - Volume 3 (collects #31–38, Definitive Edition (hc), 344 pages, 2011, ISBN 1-6069-0165-6; Omnibus (tpb), 2019, ISBN 1-5241-1003-5)
      - Includes the 6-issue spin-off limited series Herogasm (written by Ennis, art by John McCrea and Keith Burns, 2009)
      - Includes "The Comic That Got the Legend Fired" short story (art by Rob Steen) from Liberty Annual '10 (anthology, Image, 2010)
    - Volume 4 (collects #39–47, Definitive Edition (hc), 328 pages, 2012, ISBN 1-6069-0340-3; Omnibus (tpb), 2019, ISBN 1-5241-1140-6)
      - Includes the 6-issue spin-off limited series Highland Laddie (written by Ennis, art by John McCrea and Keith Burns, 2010–2011)
    - Volume 5 (collects #48–50, Definitive Edition (hc), 420 pages, 2013, ISBN 1-6069-0412-4; Omnibus (tpb), 2019, ISBN 1-5241-1334-4)
      - Includes the 6-issue spin-off limited series Butcher, Baker, Candlestickmaker (written by Ennis, art by Darick Robertson, 2011)
    - Volume 6 (collects #60–72, Definitive Edition (hc), 320 pages, 2013, ISBN 1-6069-0435-3; Omnibus (tpb), 2019, ISBN 1-5241-1337-9)
    - Oversized Omnibus Volume 1 (collects #1–30 and the short story from Liberty Comics #1, hc, 792 pages, 2022, ISBN 1-5241-2177-0)
    - Oversized Omnibus Volume 2 (collects #31–47, Herogasm #1–6, Highland Laddie #1–6 and the short story from Liberty Annual '10, hc, 792 pages, 2022, ISBN 1-5241-2180-0)
    - Oversized Omnibus Volume 3 (collects #48–72 and Butcher, Baker, Candlestickmaker #1–6, hc, 880 pages, 2022, ISBN 1-5241-2219-X)
  - The Boys: Dear Becky #1–8 (with Russ Braun, 2020–2021) collected as The Boys: Dear Becky (hc, 200 pages, 2021, ISBN 1-5241-1990-3; tpb, 2022, ISBN 1-5241-2204-1)
- Battlefields:
  - The Complete Garth Ennis' Battlefields Volume 1 (hc, 268 pages, 2009, ISBN 1-60690-079-X; tpb, 2011, ISBN 1-6069-0255-5) collects:
    - Battlefields: The Night Witches #1–3 (with Russ Braun, 2008–2009) also collected as Garth Ennis' Battlefields: The Night Witches (tpb, 96 pages, 2009, ISBN 1-6069-0028-5)
    - Battlefields: Dear Billy #1–3 (with Peter Snejbjerg, 2009) also collected as Garth Ennis' Battlefields: Dear Billy (tpb, 80 pages, 2009, ISBN 1-6069-0057-9)
    - Battlefields: The Tankies #1–3 (with Carlos Ezquerra, 2009) also collected as Garth Ennis' Battlefields: The Tankies (tpb, 80 pages, 2009, ISBN 1-6069-0075-7)
  - Battlefields (with P. J. Holden (vol. 1 #1–3), Carlos Ezquerra (vol. 1 #4–6 and vol. 2 #1–3) and Russ Braun (vol. 1 #7–9 and vol. 2 #4–6), 2009–2010) collected as:
    - Garth Ennis' Battlefields: Happy Valley (collects vol. 1 #1–3, tpb, 80 pages, 2010, ISBN 1-6069-0128-1)
    - Garth Ennis' Battlefields: The Firefly and His Majesty (collects vol. 1 #4–6, tpb, 80 pages, 2010, ISBN 1-6069-0145-1)
    - Garth Ennis' Battlefields: Motherland (collects vol. 1 #7–9, tpb, 80 pages, 2011, ISBN 1-6069-0221-0)
    - Garth Ennis' Battlefields: The Green Fields Beyond (collects vol. 2 #1–3, tpb, 80 pages, 2013, ISBN 1-6069-0416-7)
    - Garth Ennis' Battlefields: The Fall and Rise of Anna Kharkova (collects vol. 2 #4–6, tpb, 80 pages, 2013, ISBN 1-6069-0426-4)
    - The Complete Garth Ennis' Battlefields Volume 2 (collects vol. 1 #1–9, hc, 200 pages, 2011, ISBN 1-60690-222-9; tpb, 2017, ISBN 1-5241-0385-3)
    - The Complete Garth Ennis' Battlefields Volume 3 (collects vol. 2 #1–6, hc, 144 pages, 2014, ISBN 1-6069-0474-4; tpb, 2017, ISBN 1-5241-0474-4)
- Jennifer Blood #1–6 (with Adriano Batista (#1–3), Marcos Marz (#3–4) and Kewber Baal (#4–6), 2011)
  - Collected as Garth Ennis' Jennifer Blood: A Woman's Work is Never Done (tpb, 144 pages, 2012, ISBN 1-60690-261-X)
  - Collected in Garth Ennis' Jennifer Blood Omnibus Volume 1 (tpb, 744 pages, 2019, ISBN 1-5241-0862-6)
- The Shadow vol. 5 #1–6 (with Aaron Campbell, 2012) collected as The Shadow: Fire of Creation (hc, 144 pages, 2012, ISBN 1-6069-0384-5; tpb, 2012, ISBN 1-6069-0361-6)
- Red Team (with Craig Cermak):
  - Red Team #1–7 (2013–2014) collected as Garth Ennis' Red Team: Season One (tpb, 152 pages, 2014, ISBN 1-6069-0443-4)
  - Red Team: Double Tap, Center Mass #1–9 (2016–2017) collected as Garth Ennis' Red Team: Double Tap, Center Mass (tpb, 208 pages, 2017, ISBN 1-52410-395-0)
- A Train Called Love #1–10 (with Mark Dos Santos, 2015–2016) collected as Garth Ennis' A Train Called Love (tpb, 240 pages, 2017, ISBN 1-5241-0168-0)
- James Bond 007 vol. 2 #1–6 (with Rapha Lobosco, 2024) collected as James Bond 007: Your Cold, Cold Heart (hc, 132 pages, 2025, ISBN 1-5241-2552-0)

=== Aftershock Comics ===
- Dreaming Eagles #1–6 (with Simon Coleby, 2015–2016) collected as Dreaming Eagles (hc, 168 pages, 2016, ISBN 1-9350-0294-5; tpb, 2021, ISBN 1-9490-2864-X)
- Jimmy's Bastards (with Russ Braun):
  - Jimmy's Bastards #1–9 (2017–2018) collected as Jimmy's Bastards: Year One (hc, 240 pages, 2019, ISBN 1-9490-2800-3)
  - Jimmy's Little Bastards #1–2 (2022–2023)
    - The series was announced to run for 3 issues, but the last one ended up being unpublished due to Aftershock's bankruptcy.
    - A collected edition was solicited for a 2023 release but subsequently cancelled: Jimmy's Little Bastards (tpb, 144 pages, ISBN 1-9567-3133-4)
- A Walk Through Hell #1–12 (with Goran Sudžuka, 2018–2019) collected as A Walk Through Hell (hc, 256 pages, 2020, ISBN 1-9490-2842-9)
- Out of the Blue (with Keith Burns, series of graphic novels):
  - Volume 1 (hc, 72 pages, 2019, ISBN 1-9490-2813-5)
  - Volume 2 (hc, 72 pages, 2019, ISBN 1-9490-2816-X)
  - The Complete Series (compilation of both volumes — hc, 144 pages, 2020, ISBN 1-9490-2848-8; tpb, 2022, ISBN 1-9490-2887-9)
- Shock Volume 2: "Za Rodinu" (with Russ Braun, anthology graphic novel, 160 pages, 2019, ISBN 1-94902-810-0)
- The Lion and the Eagle #1–4 (with P. J. Holden, 2022) collected as The Lion and the Eagle (tpb, 192 pages, 2023, ISBN 1-9567-3106-7)

=== Other US publishers ===
- Dicks #1–4 (with John McCrea, Caliber, 1997)
  - The series serves as both an adaptation and a sequel to the story "For a Few Troubles More", originally published in the UK anthology magazine Crisis in 1990.
  - In 2002, the series was reprinted by Avatar with additional material as Bigger Dicks and later collected as Dicks by Garth Ennis and John McCrea (tpb, 176 pages, 2003, ISBN 1-59291-004-1)
  - A colorized version of Bigger Dicks was later published by Avatar as Dicks vol. 2 #1–4 (2012) and subsequently collected as Dicks Volume 1 (tpb, 176 pages, 2012, ISBN 1-5929-1173-0)
- Shadowman vol. 2 #1–4 (with Ashley Wood, Acclaim, 1997) collected in Shadowman by Garth Ennis and Ashley Wood (tpb, 192 pages, Valiant, 2016, ISBN 1-6821-5135-2)
- Painkiller Jane vs. the Darkness (with Amanda Conner, one-shot, Event, 1997)
- Just a Pilgrim (with Carlos Ezquerra, Black Bull):
  - Just a Pilgrim (hc, 200 pages, Dynamite, 2008, ISBN 1-60690-003-X; tpb, 2009, ISBN 1-60690-007-2) collects:
    - Just a Pilgrim #1–5 (2001) also collected as Just a Pilgrim (tpb, 132 pages, 2001, ISBN 0-9672489-3-0)
    - Just a Pilgrim: Garden of Eden #1–4 (2002) also collected as Just a Pilgrim: Garden of Eden (tpb, 96 pages, 2002, ISBN 0-9672-4896-5)
- Bart Simpson's Treehouse of Horror #7: "In Springfield, No One Can Hear You Scream" (with John McCrea, anthology, Bongo, 2001)
  - Collected in The Simpsons: Treehouse of Horror — Fun-Filled Frightfest (tpb, 128 pages, HarperCollins, 2003, ISBN 0-06-056070-3)
  - Collected in The Simpsons: Treehouse of Horror Ominous Omnibus Volume 3 (hc, 416 pages, Abrams ComicArts, 2024, ISBN 1-41976-352-0)
- Dark Horse:
  - Star Wars Tales (anthology):
    - "Trooper" (with John McCrea, in #10, 2001)
      - Collected by Dark Horse in Star Wars Tales Volume 3 (tpb, 232 pages, 2003, ISBN 1-56971-836-9)
      - Collected by Marvel in Star Wars Legends: The Empire Volume 8 (tpb, 496 pages, 2023, ISBN 1-3029-5390-7)
    - "In the Beginning..." (with Amanda Conner, in #11, 2002)
      - Collected by Dark Horse in Star Wars Tales Volume 3 (tpb, 232 pages, 2003, ISBN 1-56971-836-9)
      - Collected by Marvel in Star Wars Legends: The Empire Volume 4 (tpb, 496 pages, 2018, ISBN 1-3029-1208-9)
  - World of Tanks:
    - World of Tanks #1–5 (with Carlos Ezquerra (#1–2) and P. J. Holden, 2016–2017) collected as World of Tanks (tpb, 120 pages, 2017, ISBN 1-5067-0060-8)
    - World of Tanks: Citadel #1–5 (with P. J. Holden, 2018) collected as World of Tanks: Citadel (tpb, 120 pages, 2019, ISBN 1-5067-0752-1)
- Virgin:
  - 7 Brothers #1–5 (script by Ennis based on the concept by John Woo, art by Jeevan Kang, 2006–2007)
    - Collected as 7 Brothers: Sons of Heaven, Son of Hell (tpb, 144 pages, 2007, ISBN 1-934413-02-X)
    - Collected in John Woo's 7 Brothers Omnibus (tpb, 280 pages, Dynamite, 2012, ISBN 1-6069-0258-X)
  - Dan Dare #1–7 (with Gary Erskine, 2007–2008) collected as Dan Dare Omnibus (hc, 208 pages, Dynamite, 2009, ISBN 1-60690-054-4; tpb, 2009, ISBN 1-60690-040-4)
- ERF (prose children's book with illustrations by Rob Steen — self-published via Kickstarter in 2012, reprinted by Dynamite in 2013; 48 pages, ISBN 0-6156-2967-9)
- Above the Dreamless Dead: "The General" (with Phil Winslade, anthology graphic novel, 144 pages, First Second, 2014, ISBN 1-62672-065-7)
  - The short story is adapted from the eponymous poem by Siegfried Sassoon.
- TKO Studios:
  - Sara #1–6 (with Steve Epting, 2018) collected as Sara (tpb, 148 pages, 2018, ISBN 1-7327-4853-5; hc, 208 pages, 2022, ISBN 1-9522-0380-5)
  - Partisan (with Steve Epting, graphic novel, 176 pages, 2025, ISBN 1-9522-0399-6)
- The Stringbags (with P. J. Holden, graphic novel, 192 pages, Dead Reckoning, 2020, ISBN 1-6824-7503-4)
- AWA Studios:
  - Marjorie Finnegan, Temporal Criminal #1–8 (with Goran Sudžuka, 2021) collected as Marjorie Finnegan, Temporal Criminal (tpb, 208 pages, 2022, ISBN 1-9531-6525-7)
    - Ennis and Sudžuka created a new story, titled "Anywhere Anyplace Anytime Anyway", for the Kickstarter campaign to release a new collected edition of Marjorie Finnegan.
    - The new story was first published in Marjorie Finnegan, Temporal Criminal: Expanded Edition (tpb, 252 pages, 2025, ISBN 1-9531-6575-3)
  - The Ribbon Queen #1–8 (with Jacen Burrows, 2023–2024) collected as The Ribbon Queen (tpb, 192 pages, 2024, ISBN 1-9531-6552-4)
- Hello Darkness #1–6, 8: "The War" (with Becky Cloonan, anthology, Boom! Studios, 2024–2025)
  - The storyline was first reprinted over two volumes:
    - Hello Darkness Volume 1 (collects chapters from issues #1–4, tpb, 176 pages, 2025, ISBN 979-8892151023)
    - Hello Darkness Volume 2 (collects chapters from issues #5–6 and 8, tpb, 176 pages, 2025, ISBN 979-8892153720)
  - In 2025, all chapters of the story were reprinted in a 3-issue limited series under the title The War.
  - The limited series was collected as The War (tpb, 112 pages, 2026, ISBN 979-8892157322)
- Babs (with Jacen Burrows, Ahoy Comics):
  - Babs #1–6 (2024–2025) collected as Babs (tpb, 160 pages, 2025, ISBN 1-9520-9038-5)
  - Babs: The Black Road South #1–6 (2026) collected as Babs: The Black Road South (tpb, 160 pages, 2027, ISBN 1-9520-9047-4)

Preceded by Jamie Delano	Hellblazer writer 1991–1994	Succeeded by Eddie Campbell
Preceded by Alan Grant	The Demon writer 1993–1995	Succeeded by Joshua Dysart (The Demon: Driven Out)
Preceded by n/a	The Darkness writer 1996–1998	Succeeded by Malachy Coney
Preceded by Bob Hall	Shadowman writer 1997	Succeeded by Jamie Delano
Preceded by Paul Jenkins	Hellblazer writer 1998–1999	Succeeded by Warren Ellis
Preceded by Christopher Golden; Thomas E. Sniegoski	The Punisher writer 2000–2008	Succeeded by Duane Swierczynski
Preceded by Devin Grayson	Ghost Rider writer 2005–2007	Succeeded by Daniel Way
