= Stitched (film) =

- Film poster
- Directed by: Garth Ennis
- Screenplay by: Garth Ennis
- Produced by: Ed Polgardy; Brian Pulido; Francisca Pulido
- Starring: Tank Jones; Kate Kugler; Lauren Alonzo
- Cinematography: Adam Goldfine
- Edited by: Brian Pulido
- Music by: Jim Casella
- Production company: Mischief Maker Studios
- Distributed by: Avatar Press; Spitfire Productions
- Release date: July 21, 2011 (San Diego Comic-Con)
- Running time: 18 minutes
- Country: United States
- Language: English

Stitched is a 2011 American horror short film written and directed by Garth Ennis. It was created in attempt to draw interest in a feature, and to promote Ennis's own comic book series of the same name, the first issue of which was published by Avatar Press two months after the film's July premiere at the 2011 San Diego Comic-Con.

== Plot ==
In Eastern Afghanistan, three NATO operatives (one of whom, Lieutenant Pruitt, is injured) trek through the desert in search of aid, the only survivors of Black Hawk Idaho Six, which had crashed while on a mission to extract the British unit Bravo One-Five. During their journey, the trio encounter a bloodied and hysterical Taliban fighter who Cooper shoots, discovering afterward that the man's firearm was damaged and empty.

The soldiers later stumble onto five more Taliban fighters, all dead, and with their heavily mutilated remains showing signs of dismemberment and organ removal. A rattling noise then permeates the area, prompting a hidden quartet of camouflaged men armed with crude melee weapons to start advancing on the NATO personnel. The men do not respond to Corporal Twiggs's attempts to communicate with them, and are unaffected by being shot, even in the legs and head. The quartet begin to overpower the NATO crew, and during the struggle two of the assailants have their shrouds ripped off, revealing them to be withered corpses whose facial orifices are sewn shut.

The source of the rattling sound is revealed to be a man dressed in black robes who is swinging a can full of rocks. The figure is shot to death by the surviving three members of Bravo One-Five, silencing the shaken pebbles and causing the zombies to become inert. The Bravo One-Five members help the NATO crew recover, and explain that they had earlier been attacked by the "Stitched" creatures, which can seemingly only be stopped by taking out their masters, and by blowing them up while they are in their stupored state. Having already used up all of their C-4 in earlier battles, the six soldiers are forced to leave the immobilized "Stitched" unmolested, though as they vacate the area Twiggs notices that one of the creatures appears to be shedding tears.

== Cast ==
- Tank Jones as Lieutenant Pruitt
- Lauren Alonzo as Cooper
- Kate Kugler as Corporal Twiggs
- Nick Principe as Taliban Fighter/Lead Stitched
- Dave Hamdan as Dead Taliban
- Cyrus Lassus as Dead Taliban
- Bhavin Patel as Dead Taliban
- Eric Zaragoza as Stitched
- Omair Khokhar as Stitched
- Raj Suri as Stitched
- George Nelson as Black Robed Figure
- Andrew DeCarlo as Tony Barclay
- Kevin Tye as Dave Lynch
- Carlo LaTempa as Baz

== Reception ==
Ain't It Cool News was critical of the "clunky acting and unsuspenseful scenes" and opined that the short was "just kind of plain and soulless". Conversely, James Ferguson of HorrorTalk praised the production values, most of the acting, and the makeup effects, and awarded the film a score of 4/5. In a review written for Forbidden Planet International, James Bacon held Stitched in similarly complimentary regard, and concluded, "I am no expert on films, but I did not feel that shelling out £15 for this movie was anything else, except good value, for me at least".
