= Caliban (comic book series) =

2014 comic books by Garth Ennis

- The cover to Caliban #2, art by Facundo Percio.

Publication information
- Publisher: Avatar Press
- Schedule: Monthly
- Format: Limited series
- Publication date: March – October 2014
- No. of issues: 7

Creative team
- Created by: Garth Ennis; Facundo Percio
- Written by: Garth Ennis
- Artist(s): Facundo Percio
- Inker(s): Sebastian Cabrol
- Letterer(s): Kurt Hathaway
- Colorist(s): Hernan Cabrera
- Editor(s): William A. Christensen; Mark Seifert

Caliban is a creator-owned comic book series, blending the science fiction and horror genres. The series was created by writer Garth Ennis and artist Facundo Percio, and published by Avatar Press as a seven-issue limited series in 2014.

== Creation ==
Ennis was inspired to write the series while trying to guess the plot of Alien prequel Prometheus. He described the original as one of his favourite films; when he saw Prometheus it went in a different direction than he had expected, and Ennis decided to turn his idea into a comic. Ennis also cited Event Horizon, Pitch Black and Pandorum as influences, but hoped Caliban would do something new with the concept. He chose to work with Percio after admiring his "mesmerising" work on Alan Moore's Fashion Beast.

== Publishing history ==
Despite being dated March 2014, the first issue shipped in April. The first issue sold 13,196 copies to comic stores, ranking 154th on Diamond's charts., though by the final issue this had dropped to 7,766 copies and 252nd. As was typical for Avatar titles, the first issue featured six variant covers, while the other six issues had five apiece.

== Synopsis ==
In the future mankind has explored 119 planets and moons, not finding a single one that is habitable or supports intelligent life. Instead space travel revolves around mining various minerals, with ships transporting cryogenically preserved expert personnel through warpspace. One such vessel is the Caliban, named for the Shakespearean character, which is making a seemingly routine journey when without warning it is merged with a huge unknown ship in warpspace. 17 of the 30-strong ship crew are instantly killed, while the cargo of 90 sleeping miners is vented into space by the accident. Atmospheric seals allow the survivors to travel between sections of the Caliban and the unknown vessel.

Survivors include the ship's captain Delong, executive officer Pierce, pilot McCartney, systems officer Nomi Gallo, engineer Sanchita "San" Malik, Cuthbert and Ferrara. Nomi and San explore, stumbling into a huge chamber on the other ship containing preserved, dead alien lifeforms. Aside from that the other ship is deserted. Twelve of the survivors reconvene and after briefly discussing the scientific implications of the accident before deciding all they can do is attempt to ensure their survival, sealing off non-essential sections of the Caliban to reduce the amount of oxygen being vented into the other ship. As it will take a month for a distress signal to reach the nearest station Delong decides they will try to trigger the other ship's engines, assigning San to try and interface with the alien computer and Malik - who confesses she's long been attracted to an oblivious San - as her bodyguard. Unaccounted for is the ship's navigator Karien, who briefly made contact with the others but is believed dead. He opens a door to the other ship and is briefly confronted by a huge alien corpse before it disintegrates. In the process Karien becomes possessed by a malevolent alien consciousness and begins killing Caliban survivors.

Karien uses the alien ship's equipment to modify his own body and abducts Pierce and Cuthbert, torturing them to find out the limits of the human body. Having been lovers with Pierce, Delong slumps into depression. McCartney gets him back to the bridge and discusses Karien's inhuman behaviour with Nomi and San. With little option but to continue with the plan Ferrara leads a team to continue sealing off the unneeded areas while McCartney and the near-catatonic Delong make for Cuthbert's quarters, the crewman having confessed he smuggled a contraband gun onboard before he was taken.

Nomi continues to make progress on linking the two ships' computers but when Ferrara's team discover Karien they opt to make an impromptu attack with welders and tools. However, the creature is even stronger than before and kills all five of them easily before McCartney can arrive with the gun. Instead he returns to the bridge with Delong, and the survivors note that even the gun would likely be no use on Karien in his current state. Nomi meanwhile successfully links the computers and accesses the alien craft's databanks.

They find the ship belongs to a race who describe themselves as "Faunaculturists", who have found 98 inhabited worlds. One had all its lifeforms die and after returning to their craft they began to be killed in a similar manner to the crew of the Caliban, with the malevolent entity jumping from victim to victim. Unable and unwilling to kill it the remaining aliens opted to shut down life support and broadcast warnings. Discovering that the incident took place in the year 1369, Nomi, San and McCartney realise the entity is capable of laying dormant for centuries. They also deduce that it hopped around several of the aliens trying to find a navigator so it could travel to a new planet; by possessing Karien it already has the navigational information it needs to get to Earth, and is likely also trying to restart the merged ships. Unable to risk moving through the ships and running into Karien the only option is for McCartney to take a coupling outside. However, the creature has modified Karien's body to the extent it is able to step into the void and caves in the helmet of McCartney's space suit, killing him. Delong meanwhile commits suicide with the gun. Now the only two survivors, Nomi and San use the gun to set a trap on the bridge for the creature as San tells Nomi that she fell for her when they first met.

They move back into the other ship as the trap fails when the bullet only wounds Karien. San plans to use the alien equipment to give Karien's body an overdose of modifications to incapacitate him, realising that killing him will only means the entity jumps to one of their bodies. However, Karien arrives and impales San and prepares to force Nomi to take him to Earth with her computer skills.

San is only wounded and attacks the alien, having injected herself with body-modifying technology. She pins Karien to the deck as the pair prepare to fire up the engines of the alien ship; Nomi belatedly realises San means to stay behind and overheat the engines' core in order to ensure the entity is destroyed. San knocks Nomi out and places her in an escape capsule, ejecting her from the Caliban. She is attacked by the creature but with her own enhancements is able to overpower and drown it in a vat of preservative. The entity leaps in San's body but she has prepared for the eventuality, having taken an overdose herself and ensuring they are both destroyed as the ships go critical. Meanwhile, Nomi's escape pod floats safely in space, broadcasting an SOS as she is in cryogenic sleep, dreaming of San.

== Characters ==
- Nomi Gallo: Systems officer on the Caliban, Nomi is a relative newcomer to space travel, on her second tour. While she is something of a dreamer the mundane nature of actual space travel has worn her down. Sweet and good-natured, Nomi is from Queens and was posted to the station Moon South Six before her first five-month stint on the Caliban, motivated by her desire to see the stars. She is the crew's sole survivor.
- Sanchita Malik: Known as San, Malik is a tough engineer on board the ship. She turned down command of the Gethsemane to remain in her post, which she candidly admits to Nomi was a case of her "bitching out". She instantly fell in love with Nomi when they first met on board the Caliban on a space station above Earth. However she was afraid of Nomi's potential reaction and didn't declare her interest so as not to scare Nomi. Both her homosexuality and her attraction to Nomi are an open secret among the rest of the crew, leading to her being entrusted with Nomi's safety due, with Ferrera reasoning no-one will fight harder to protect their one hope of activating the alien computers. San injects herself with alien genetic material in order to match Karien, gets Nomi to safety and then makes sure the malicious entity is trapped in her overdosing body as she overloads the computers.
- Karien: The ship's arrogant navigator, unpopular with the rest of the crew. When the Caliban collides with the alien ship he is seemingly trapped and opens a door, seeing one of the cartilage-based beings before it disintegrates, allowing the entity to transfer to his body. According to the intelligence he retains awareness of what is happening throughout and derives a measure of pleasure from his body being modified and used to destroy his crew-mates. His body is eventually destroyed by San.
- McCartney: A fatalistic, foul-mouthed and experienced Scottish engineer. His quick thinking in raising the shields ensures there are survivors from the initial collision. He has great respect for the ship's captain and attempts to keep his spirits up after the death of Pierce. McCartney is able to retrieve a gun from Cuthbert's quarters and is later tasked with connecting the controls to the alien ship's engines via a spacewalk. However, he is discovered by Karien outside the ship, and the possessed navigator smashes his space helmet before casting him off into space.
- Delong: The ship's captain, who is engaged in intercourse with Pierce when the collision happens. Delong initially takes charge of the recovery operation with authority; however when Pierce is taken by Karien he rapidly loses the will to live and becomes withdrawn despite McCartney's attempts to rouse him. He plays no real part in the subsequent revised plans and eventually shoots himself in front of Nomi.
- Pierce: The ship's executive officer, who is a lover of Delong - something which is perhaps the second-worst kept secret on the Caliban behind San's lesbianism. She is grabbed by the modified Karien and despite putting up a fight - during which she breaks one of his eye-sockets and slices open his top lip, only to watch in horror as the damage regenerates - she is overpowered and taken off into the ship. Once there Karien breaks most of her bones testing the limits of human physiology with her screams broadcast over the ship's communications, and presumably dies of her wounds.
- Ferrara: Ferrara survives the initial collision and is on a welding party with Forth; heading off by herself gives Karien the opportunity to kill him. After the death of Pierce she takes over command of the welding operation before taking what she believes is an attempt for herself, Enkerr, Stapleton, Kawanishi and Mapow to jump Karien and kill him. However, she badly underestimates his drastically increased strength and Karien crushes her skull against a bulkhead before she even finishes giving the order to attack.
- Cuthbert: A powerfully-built member of the crew, after the collision Cuthbert confesses that he has smuggled a gun on board. He attempts to snap Delong out of his fugue when Pierce is taken only to be grabbed himself and similarly tortured by Karien as the alien studies how his body takes it, watched by the broken, dying Pierce.
- Forth: One of the survivors of the collision, Forth is left welding alone when Ferrara heads off to check elsewhere. He is attacked by Karien, who breaks his leg, throws him down to a lower deck and jumps on his head, destroying his head.
- Enkerr: Another to survive the initial collision, Enkerr is among those sent to weld inessential areas shut to prevent the loss of air. He baulks at going back out again after the loss of Pierce and Cuthbert but is put in his place by Ferrara. During the ambush on Karien he attempts to choke the navigator with a large wrench but it has no effect. He pleads for his life after the others are killed but is similarly slaughtered.
- Stapleton: Another to survive the initial collision, Stapleton is among those sent to weld inessential areas shut to prevent the loss of air. During the ambush on Karien she attempts to tackle his legs but he stamps on her throat, killing her.
- Kawanishi: One of the "sleep techs" charged with monitoring the cargo of suspended miners, Kawanishi survives the collision and is put to work welding. During the ambush on Karien he attempts to use a welder as a weapon, only to have it snatched off him and fatally rammed down his throat.
- Mapow: A "sleep tech" like Kawanishi, Mapow survives the collision and is put to work welding. During the ambush on Karien he attempts to club him, only to have his neck snapped by a backhand slap.
- Canny: A timid member of the crew attracted for Nomi, Canny is fatally wounded when the Caliban materialises inside the alien ship. Despite the rear half of his body being swallowed up he survives for a few seconds and seeks comfort from Nomi, who is too shocked to provide it - instead San takes his hand.
- Cotton, Forcyk, Nussbaum: Three members of the crew killed during the collision when the alien ship materialises around them. Nussbaum is only tentatively identified by her wedding ring.

== Reception ==
Writing for Multiversity Comics, Michelle White rated the first issue at 8.9 out of 10 while Lonnie Nadler of Bloody Disgusting rated it 4.5 out of 5. Gary Collinson of Flickering Myth gave the seventh and final issue a moderately positive review. Tom Kelly of World Comic Book Review gave the series as a whole a negative review, identifying it as derivative of Ridley Scott's film Alien. Comics Bookcase's D. Emerson Eddy was more positive in a retrospective review, who identified the story as gripping even if it featured familiar elements.

== Collected editions ==
The series has been collected into a single volume.

Title	ISBN	Release date	Issues
Caliban	978-1592912506	February 2015	Caliban #1–7
