= Troubled Souls (comics) =

British comic book story

- The cover of the collected edition of Troubled Souls, featuring Tom Boyd (left) and Damian McWilliams; art by John McCrea.
- Publisher: Fleetway Publications
- Publication date: 1 April – 16 September 1989
- Title(s): Crisis #15-20, #22-27; 1 April to 16 September 1989
- Main character(s): Tom Boyd; Damian McWilliams; Dougie Patterson; Ivor Thompson

Creative team
- Writer: Garth Ennis
- Artist: John McCrea
- Editor: Steve MacManus
- Troubled Souls – A Crisis Graphic Novel: ISBN 978-0-85386-174-4

"Troubled Souls" is a British comic story. It was originally published in the adult-orientated anthology comic Crisis between 1 April and 16 September 1989. It was the first professional comics work for writer Garth Ennis, and was painted by John McCrea; the pair would go on to be regular collaborators. The story is set during the then-ongoing Troubles in Northern Ireland, featuring an unlikely bond forming between a Protestant and a catholic IRA volunteer. A sequel story following supporting characters Dougie and Ivor, "For a Few Troubles More", followed in 1990.

== Creation ==
Falling sales of Fleetway Publications' Crisis saw editor Steve MacManus adjust his original plans to produce two ongoing serials which could be syndicated for American publication; of the two launch stories, "Third World War" was to continue while "New Statesmen" was dropped. Instead MacManus wanted to run two shorter additional stories. He had met aspiring writer Garth Ennis (who had previously had a readers' letter printed in Battle Picture Weekly in 1979, at the time subedited by MacManus) on the Crisis launch signing tour in Belfast. Ennis briefly pitched to MacManus, who encouraged him to write an outline. Contact with Crisis assistant Igor Goldkind was encouraging, and Ennis was briefly considered to co-write some episodes of "Third World War" set in Northern Ireland with Pat Mills until the latter met Malachy Coney first.

MacManus contacted Ennis about his outline – and after the writer turned in a spec script for the opening episode in two days, and seeking feedback from Mills – commissioned him to write the full story. To get the correct local detail Ennis wanted an artist familiar with Belfast, and the experienced Will Simpson was strongly considered; however, he was committed to "Rogue Trooper" in 2000 AD. Instead, Ennis' good friend John McCrea, who had provided art for tie-in media and made some small contributions to 2000 AD, was given the job of painting the story. He and Ennis had previously worked together on a then-unpublished story called "Tosspot Four". MacManus would later recall meeting the pair at the Fleetway offices was the first time he felt old.

== Publishing history ==
Alongside "Sticky Fingers", "Troubled Souls" debuted in Crisis #15 (dated 1 April 1989) and ran for twelve episodes before concluding; the story was not featured in Crisis #21. In 1990 it was published in collect form, also by Fleetway

== Plot summary ==
Tom Boyd is a young unemployed Protestant man living in Belfast. He is unpolitical and largely views the presence of the British Army as a mildly curious part of life, and enjoys visiting pubs with his friend Dougie, who attempts to set Tom up with Liz, a girl he knew in school. However, a night at his local changes when a stranger about to be arrested by the Ulster Defence Regiment drop a parcel in his lap; unwrapping it he discovers a gun. Panicking, he doesn't show the police, and confronts the man when he returns to the pub, beaten but free, returning the weapon and telling him he doesn't want to be involved. His older brother Andy is planning to move to London, tired of sectarianism, while Tom confides the encounter from the pub to his aunt Angie before the man finds him again. The stranger takes him to a café and tries to enrol his help, introducing himself as Damien. Tom is uninterested but realises Damien knows where his family lives, and is pressured into agreeing. To take his mind off things he attempts to read up more on Britain's history in Ireland as The Twelfth approaches and dislikes it, but wonders if he is just trying to justify Damien's coercion to himself. Damien reveals their target is a British Army Land Rover and becomes even more worried. However, he hits it off with Liz and the pair spent time together and kiss.

Tom plants the bomb according to Damien's instructions. He and Dougie visit Ivor, a friend who has recently returned from jail after being caught with a gun after signing up for the Ulster Volunteer Force, but panics after realising Liz might be in the path of the explosives. Tom is able to make sure she is safe before the bomb destroys its target but is left shaken after seeing the carnage it causes and his leg is wounded by shrapnel. With time to think, he becomes increasingly angry about how little both sides of the debate seem to care about the ordinary people, while feeling deeply guilty about his part in the killings and Liz's belief he is a hero.

Meanwhile, Damien's superior Rourke believes Tom is a security risk, and orders him killed. His attempts are half-hearted until he is told he will be killed unless Tom is. Damien takes Tom to an IRA safehouse, where he explains he got involved in the IRA after his brother was killed by the British Army after being caught up in a crossfire. Now he is disillusioned as the organisation seems to have turned largely into racketeers, working with the UVF to keep the war going. The pair develop an unlikely friendship and are forced on the run when the safehouse comes under attack from the UDR, who have been tipped off. Returning to town, Tom bolts and Damien is shot by soldiers. Shaken, Tom leaves Belfast and Liz behind, claiming he can no longer deal with the war.

== Collected editions ==
| Title | ISBN | Publisher | Release date | Contents |
|---|---|---|---|---|
| Troubled Souls – A Crisis Graphic Novel | 9781853861741 | Fleetway Publications | 1990 | Material from Crisis #15-20 and #22-27 |

== Reception ==
Jack Kibble-White rated the collected edition two stars out of five for Slings and Arrows, feeling that while it had some positives it was more "an antiquated early work for creators just on the cusp of becoming ready to produce far better things".

Like much of his early work, Ennis has been dismissive of "Troubled Souls" in recent years – taking considerable pains in pointing out that the work was in no way autobiographical, describing his own upbringing as a middle class one where the Troubles were only a peripheral background event, and later claiming "my intention was to launch my career by whatever means were available".
