= Punisher Kills the Marvel Universe =

1995 Marvel Comics one-shot by Garth Ennis

- Cover to Punisher Kills the Marvel Universe reprint. Art by Steve Dillon.

Publication information
- Publisher: Marvel Comics
- Publication date: November 1995
- Main character(s): Punisher; Daredevil; Marvel Universe

Creative team
- Written by: Garth Ennis
- Penciller: Doug Braithwaite
- Inker(s): Martin Griffiths; Mike Halbleib; Sean Hardy; Don Hudson; John Livesay; Robin Riggs
- Letterer: Bill Oakley
- Colorist(s): Malibu; Shannon Blanchard; Tom Smith
- Editor: Marcus McLaurin

Collected editions
- Punisher by Garth Ennis Omnibus: ISBN 0-7851-3383-6

Punisher Kills the Marvel Universe is a 1995 one-shot comic book published by Marvel Comics. It is a satire of 1990s comic books, aimed at fans. Written by Garth Ennis and illustrated by Doug Braithwaite with most inking done by Michael L. Halblieb, the story depicts Frank Castle killing every superhero and supervillain in the Marvel Universe after his family is killed.

== Plot ==
Frank Castle becomes an officer in the NYPD SWAT team after leaving the U.S. Marine Corps. Rather than falling victim to a gangland slaying, Castle's wife and children are instead killed when caught in the middle of a battle between the Avengers, the X-Men, and a group of Brood and other aliens in Central Park. Castle arrives to find his family dead, and Daredevil berating Cyclops and Captain America for their carelessness.

As Castle grieves, none of the heroes are willing to admit their fault in the deaths, until finally Cyclops attempts to apologize. Enraged, Castle opens fire on the assembled heroes, killing Cyclops, Hawkeye, Shadowcat, and Jubilee. Castle is attacked and wounded by Wolverine, and only survives due to the intervention of Colossus.

After recovering from his injuries, Castle is put on trial for homicide. His attorney is Matt Murdock, who recognizes Castle as the man who rescued him from a gang of ruffians when they were young. Despite Murdock's defense, Castle is sentenced to life imprisonment.

When the prison van taking him to jail stops, Castle finds himself at the mountain mansion of a rich but hideously disfigured old man named Kesselring. Kesselring introduces Castle to his associates, other disfigured and brain-damaged individuals, who reveal that they were maimed in the crossfire of superhero/supervillain battles. They will provide Castle with all the resources he will need if he will destroy every superhuman on earth. Thirsting for revenge, Castle agrees and becomes the Punisher.

With the help of Microchip, a former member of the US Air Force whose legs were pulled off by Doctor Octopus, the Punisher sets about his mission. He begins by trapping Spider-Man and Venom in the sewers and killing them while they are fighting one another. The Hulk is killed after his latest rampage, while his alter-ego Bruce Banner is recovering in an alleyway, located by Castle using a dart-gun tracking transmitter.

Castle is captured and jailed on several occasions, but is broken out each time by Kesselring. During these periods, he is visited by Murdock, who pleads for Castle to stop the slaughter.

He kills Doctor Doom, then lures the various mutant super-teams to the moon and wipes them out with a nuclear missile. The Fantastic Four and the Avengers are also disposed of. Wolverine and Captain America are killed in one-on-one confrontations. Castle eventually exterminates nearly all of the Marvel Universe, including Ghost Rider, Black Panther, and Nick Fury among others.

Growing weary of all the killings, Castle tells Kesselring that he expects to not hear from him again once his assignment is complete. Kesselring tells him that the Punisher's crusade will never be complete, as a new generation of heroes will inevitably rise, and must be halted. When Kesselring pulls a gun, the Punisher kills him. He then tells Kesselring's associates that their need for vengeance has made them bitter and pathetic, leaving with the threat of killing them all if any of them try to contact him. Castle leaves to complete his assignment by killing Daredevil.

After a battle, Castle is wounded after falling off a roof. Daredevil tells Castle that he does not need to live through his pain, and begs for him to let it go. Not listening, Castle fatally stabs Daredevil through the chest. Before he dies, Daredevil removes his mask and Castle is shocked to see the face of Matt Murdock, who tells him that "there's always a man behind the mask" with his dying breath. Realizing he has become the very thing he swore to destroy, the Punisher kills himself.
