= Back to Brooklyn (comics) =

Comic miniseries

Back to Brooklyn is a five-issue miniseries created by writers Garth Ennis and Jimmy Palmiotti and artist Mihailo Vukelic, published by Image Comics in 2008. The series was collected in a trade paperback in 2009.

== Plot ==
Back to Brooklyn is a crime-based action drama about Bob Saetta, the number-two man and chief hitter for Brooklyn's Saetta crime family. Unfortunately for Bob, he knows too much. "Having discovered a horrific secret about his boss and older brother, Paul, Bob is trying to save his wife and son from his family's wrath while avoiding the violent attentions of Paul's soldiers," Garth Ennis told CBR News. "All Brooklyn is out to get our hero, believing that he has turned rat – the result of a deal he's supposed to have cut with the New York City Police Department. Bob is gambling that he's resourceful enough to survive on his home turf, but the ghastly truth about his brother is only the tip of the iceberg. The streets Bob knows so well have become a killing ground, and the horrors and depravity lurking there will stagger even a hardened killer like himself."

== Collected editions ==
One volume collects the entire mini-series:

- Back to Brooklyn Volume 1 (188 pages, paperback, July 2009, ISBN 1607060604)
