= True Faith (comics) =

British comic book story

- The cover of Crisis #29, spotlighting "True Faith". Terry Adair is centre, with gun; Nigel Gibson is bottom right. Left-hand side (top to bottom) are teacher Mr. Hunt, Angela Hyman and Henson. Art by Warren Pleece.
- Publisher: Fleetway Publications
- Publication date: 14 October 1989 – 17 February 1990
- Title(s): Crisis #29-38; 14 October 1989 to 17 February 1990

Creative team
- Writer: Garth Ennis
- Artist: Warren Pleece
- Editor: Steve MacManus
- True Faith (1990): ISBN 9781853862014
- True Faith (1997): ISBN 9781563893780

"True Faith" is a creator-owned British comic story. It was originally published in the adult-oriented anthology comic Crisis between 14 October 1989 and 17 February 1990. Written by Garth Ennis and illustrated by Warren Pleece, the story serves as a satirical critique of organised religion.

While the original serialised publication passed without incident, the release of a collected edition in 1990 provoked mainstream controversy; the book was subsequently withdrawn and pulped. In 1997, a new collected edition was published by DC Comics imprint Vertigo.

== Creation ==
Garth Ennis received his first professional commission, Troubled Souls, for Fleetway Publications' anthology title Crisis earlier in 1989, to a positive response from readers. Crisis editor Steve MacManus subsequently approached Ennis for further ideas. Ennis later recalled, "I fancied doing something funnier, something that sat better with my own experiences and interests — my distrust of organised religion, in this instance." MacManus assigned Warren Pleece as artist, having been highly impressed after seeing his work on Velocity, a self-published comic Pleece produced with his brother Gary.

== Publishing history ==
The story was one of several Crisis serials to be rapidly repackaged as a graphic novel, an unusual step for British comics at the time. Rian Hughes, art director for Crisis, handled the design, which included a new cover commissioned from Pleece and a foreword by Grant Morrison. At this stage, the story began to attract negative attention from Christian groups, and The Sunday Times published an interview with Dave Roberts (then editor of the Christian magazine Alpha), describing it as "an incitement to religious hatred" and comparing it to Salman Rushdie's The Satanic Verses as an example of blasphemy.

Fleetway's managing director, John Davidge — who had previously controversially blocked Crisis from publishing Peter Milligan and Brendan McCarthy's "Skin" — ordered the collected edition to be withdrawn after a short period on sale; a press release stated this was due to the story being "inappropriate" for the book market. Reportedly, Davidge made the decision on the direct order of Fleetway owner Robert Maxwell. The print run — variously reported as being 5,000 or 20,000 copies — was destroyed. The Economist ran an article on the controversy on 19 January 1991, speculating that "no one would think twice about it" if the story were a novel, and arguing that the furore was largely caused by the ongoing belief in the press that comics were still exclusively aimed at children. New Statesman also discussed the controversy, quoting a BBC Radio 4 interview in which Ennis reiterated his opposition to organised religion.

In 1997, DC's mature readers' imprint Vertigo Comics, for whom Ennis was writing Preacher at the time, released a new collected edition with a new cover by Pleece and a new foreword by Ennis himself.

== Plot summary ==
London schoolboy Nigel Gibson attends a Scripture Union meeting, motivated entirely by his interest in the devout attendee Angela Hyman. He manages to persuade her to accompany him to the pub, but soon realises she only sees him as a potential convert. He insults Angela and her friends — including rugby player Henson, who is also hinted to be interested in Christianity merely to pursue Angela — stating his belief that God does not exist. Another man at the bar, a recent widower named Terry Adair, joins him in arguing against the Christian group, claiming that he plans to kill God, before abruptly leaving.

Nigel continues to berate Angela before deciding to follow Terry, fascinated despite considering him likely insane. At Terry's sparse flat, Terry rants about attacking churches in order to flush God out and kill him. Alarmed, Nigel talks Terry into letting him leave, but on his way home he sees a church burning. He attempts to report Terry to a policeman, but Terry appears and kills the officer. Nigel flees home, only to find that Terry has butchered his dog, Rex. Cornered in an alley, Nigel is instead taken by Terry as a collaborator rather than being attacked. Realising that Adair will harm his family if he resists, Nigel reluctantly goes along with him.

The pair firebomb a church together, with Adair mercilessly killing a priest who attempts to stop them. They are then captured by the Truth Soldiers, led by Cornelius Garten, who claims to share Adair’s aim of removing "the cancer of God" from the world and provides them with a large arsenal of weapons. A series of arson attacks against churches follows, drawing national media attention. The Prime Minister orders action and deploys the SAS to guard prominent churches in London.

Nigel's personality becomes increasingly dark, and he is suspended from school after attacking Henson with a cricket bat. His family, however, remain indifferent. Garten reveals that their next target is St Paul's Cathedral, but they are ambushed by SAS troopers. Most of the Truth Soldiers are killed as Nigel, Terry and Garten take cover. Terry remains resolute until Garten mentions his late wife, about whom Terry had never spoken. Garten then confesses that he bribed a doctor to botch Terry's wife's operation, believing that God had killed his own wife when she died during childbirth. While the two argue, they are discovered and shot by the SAS, allowing Nigel to escape.

Nigel returns to school before his suspension has ended, drinking vodka and briefly speaking with Angela. When confronted by his bullying teacher Mr Hunt, Nigel shoots him in the head with Terry's revolver and waits for the police to arrive, reflecting that he has finally found true faith — in himself.

== Collected editions ==
Title	ISBN	Publisher	Release date	Contents
True Faith	9781853862014	Fleetway Publications	1990	Material from Crisis #29-38.
True Faith	9781563893780	Vertigo Comics	1997	Material from Crisis #29-38.

== Reception ==
MacManus recalled that the story had received a positive review in NME. As with several of his early works (including Troubled Souls), Ennis has expressed dislike for True Faith — comparing Terry Adair to a "rejected Dredd villain" and reserving particularly harsh criticism for the author surrogate Nigel Gibson, describing him as a "whiny little sod who needed a good kick up the arse". He also referred to the character as a stock "neurotic boy outsider" (NBO), similar to those found in Grant Morrison's St. Swithin's Day and John Smith's Straitgate. Ennis resolved to leave the "NBO" archetype behind after seeing a particularly scathing Martin Rowson cartoon in The Guardian, which, in his view, encapsulated the "wretched self-indulgence" of such characters.

In a retrospective review for Slings & Arrows' online graphic novel guide, Gareth Forest described the story as an "early curio" and considered it interesting for tracing the development of Ennis’s career, regarding it as a "flawed but ambitious book".
