= Troubled Souls =

1994 video game

Troubled Souls is a puzzle video game developed by Randy Reddig and released by Varcon Systems, Inc. on September 1, 1994, for the Macintosh. It was distributed by MacSoft. Troubled Souls is compatible with System Software 6 and later.

== Gameplay ==
In the game, the player must connect pieces to make a complete shape until a certain score is reached. Troubled Souls is similar to Pipe Mania.

== Development ==
Troubled Souls was developed by the 17-year-old Randy Reddig. He made it between August 1992 and September 1994, its release month.

== Reception ==
Reception

Review scores
Publication	Score
Next Generation	3/5
MacUser	4.5/5

Next Generation reviewed the Macintosh version of the game, rating it three stars out of five, and stated that "With gorgeously bleak H.R. Giger/H.P. Lovecraft-style graphics, nicely gross pulsating hearts for continue markers, and an eerie background melody straddling the line between 'The Twilight Zone' them and the soundtrack from the movie 'Phantasm', this is one title every CRT zombie will enjoy."

Troubled Souls won Electronic Entertainment's 1994 "Best Brain-Drain Game" award. The editors wrote that its "game play is compelling, and its haunting music and graphics add to the atmospheric fun." It also took Inside Mac Games' "Puzzle Game of the Year" prize.

== External links and references ==
- Le Grenier du Mac - Troubled Souls

Reddig, Randy. Troubled Souls. 1994. Macintosh Garden. N.p.: n.p., n.d. N. pag. Macintosh Garden. Web. 17 Nov. 2010. <Troubled Souls - Macintosh Garden>. (Currently Unused Source)
