= Shadow Man: 2econd Coming =

2002 video game

- Developer: Acclaim Studios Teesside
- Publisher: Acclaim Entertainment
- Producer: Nick Bagley
- Designers: Jonathan Heckley; Mathew Ward
- Programmer: Martin Fuller
- Artists: Michael Muskett; Andrew Catling
- Writers: Guy Miller; Simon Phipps
- Composer: Nick Arundel
- Series: Shadowman
- Platform: PlayStation 2
- Release: NA: 28 February 2002; EU: 8 March 2002
- Genre: Action-adventure
- Mode: Single-player

Shadow Man: 2econd Coming is an action-adventure video game developed by Acclaim Studios Teesside and published by Acclaim Entertainment for the PlayStation 2. It is a sequel to the 1999 video game Shadow Man and, like the previous game, is based on the Shadowman comic book series published by Valiant Comics.

== Plot ==
The game starts as New York cop Thomas Deacon and his partner Gabe fight a huge demonic creature named Sammael in an abandoned building. Their goal is to steal an enormous ancient book, because it couldn't be allowed to fall into the hands of evil. Thomas successfully grabs the codex and escapes the building, but Gabe is horrifically shredded to pieces by Sammael's claws.

Nettie was waiting for Michael at her church but she felt that something was wrong. Nettie looked at the sky, where she saw a blazing star, and she knew that it meant trouble. Simultaneously, in a run-down N.Y. tenement building, a legless Thomas Deacon, who lost his legs fleeing the demon & taking the codex with him, rolled over to the window in his wheelchair and noticed the gigantic star. Michael had already looked out the dusty train window and noticed the unfamiliar sky. He had to ask Nettie, because the whole world might be in trouble.

Michael wasted no time upon his arrival in New Orleans & went straight to the Wild at Heart bar, which was run by Jaunty, the closest person Michael had to a "friend". The bar was deserted and dead quiet, which was severely out of place. Michael couldn't find Jaunty, but once he went upstairs into the loft, he found everything ransacked, a dead body, and bloody arcane symbols drawn on the walls. Michael knew it was some sort of gang, but he did not recognize it.

After meeting up with Nettie in the church, they both plan to search the Louisiana swampland for Jaunty. Michael still needed to find his gun and his dad's pocket watch, but Jaunty was a priority. The mysterious gang had kidnapped Jaunty and hung him in a tree, with the same arcane symbols from the bar, but this time they were on his head. After Michael finds and returns Jaunty to Mama Nettie, he is cursed with a powerful spell. Upon completion of his second task and after another visit with Mama Nettie, Michael receives a note from a man named Thomas Deacon, whom he goes about in search of. When Michael finds Thomas, he learns about the codex, Asmodeus, and the Grigori, as well as their plan to cause Armageddon. It is once again up to Michael, or Shadow Man, to save the world.

== Development ==
The game was first announced on 3 May 2000, as one of the first officially-revealed titles from Acclaim to be released on the PlayStation 2. The game was announced for a release in early-2001.

== Controversy ==
Acclaim created a minor controversy when plans of advertising the title on small billboards attached to real tombstones were announced, saying they would pay relatives of the deceased for the advertising, adding that "poorer" families might be especially interested.

== Reception ==
Reception

Aggregate score
Aggregator	Score
Metacritic	68/100

Review scores
Publication	Score
Computer and Video Games	8/10
Electronic Gaming Monthly	6/10
Game Informer	7/10
GamePro	3/5
GameSpot	6.9/10
GameSpy	65%
GameZone	7.1/10
IGN	7.7/10
Official U.S. PlayStation Magazine	2/5
X-Play	4/5

Shadow Man: 2econd Coming received "average" reviews according to video game review aggregator Metacritic.
