= Cameron Stewart =

Canadian comic book creator

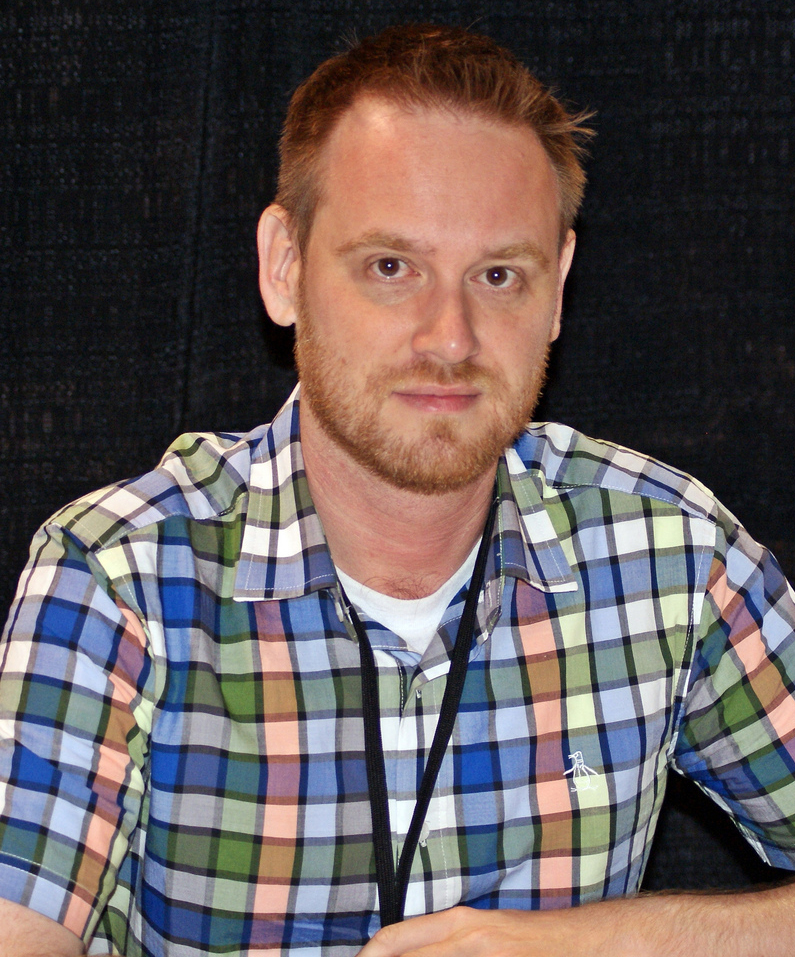
- Stewart in June 2011
- Born: Toronto, Ontario, Canada
- Areas: Writer, Artist
- Notable works: Batman and Robin; Catwoman; Batgirl; Seaguy; The Other Side; Sin Titulo
- Awards: Eisner Award; Shuster Award

Cameron Stewart (born 1975) is a Canadian comic book creator. He first came to prominence when he collaborated as an illustrator with writer Grant Morrison, and he went on to illustrate Catwoman and co-write Batgirl. He won Eisner and Shuster Awards for his self-published mystery web comic Sin Titulo, and received an Eisner nomination for The Other Side (written by Jason Aaron).

== Early life ==
Stewart was born in Canada to British parents.

== Career ==
Stewart began working for DC around 2000, inking the last half of Deadenders, written by Ed Brubaker and penciled by Warren Pleece. In 2002 he started work on Brubaker's run on Catwoman.

In 2004 he illustrated Seaguy, a 3-issue series written by Grant Morrison. The team followed this the next year with the 4-issue Seven Soldiers: Guardian. Stewart and Morrison returned to Seaguy with Seaguy: Slaves of Mickey Eye in 2009. Stewart continued his collaboration with Morrison, illustrating issues #7–9 and #16 of Batman and Robin in 2010, and an issue of Morrison's Multiversity limited series.

Beginning in 2006, he collaborated with writer Jason Aaron on The Other Side, a serialized graphic novel about the Vietnam War, published by Vertigo. The series was nominated in 2007 for an Eisner Award for Best Limited Series.

Stewart worked on a variety of smaller projects. He illustrated The Apocalypstix, written by Ray Fawkes and published by Oni Press in 2008. With Karl Kerschl he co-wrote and co-drew the 2010 miniseries Assassin's Creed: The Fall, based on the Assassin's Creed video game franchise. Stewart and Kerschl later collaborated again on two graphic novel follow-ups: Assassin's Creed: The Chain in 2012, and Assassin's Creed: Brahman in 2013. He also worked on four issues of the SuicideGirls comic book in 2011.

Away from the major comics publishers, Stewart wrote, illustrated Sin Titulo (Untitled in Spanish), a black and white crime story which he self-published online from 2007 to 2012. The comic received a 2009 Joe Shuster Award for Webcomics, and the 2010 Eisner Award for Best Digital Comic. It was later published in print by Dark Horse Comics.

In 2014, when Gail Simone left Batgirl, Stewart took over writing the series and was joined by co-writer Brenden Fletcher, artist Babs Tarr, and colorist Jordie Bellaire. After the series ended in 2016, the team of Stewart, Fletcher and Tarr collaborated on Motor Crush, published by Image Comics.

Stewart illustrated two sequels to the novel Fight Club, written by author Chuck Palahniuk. Fight Club 2 was published in 2015, and Fight Club 3 was published in 2019. In early 2020, Stewart worked again with Brubaker to contribute a 12-page story titled "The Art of Picking a Lock" to DC Comics' Catwoman 80th Anniversary 100-Page Super Spectacular #1.

== Allegations of sexual misconduct ==
In June 2020, Stewart was accused by multiple people of predatory sexual behavior. At the time the events happened, the accusers were much younger fans, friends or aspiring artists in their teens and early twenties, and Stewart was in his mid to late thirties. The accusers said that he used his status as a professional artist to get them to trust him, while all along this was a pretext for his real intent of making sexual advances, or grooming. Polygon reported that "according to some corroborating voices [...] Stewart's reputation for this behavior was widely known in Toronto's close-knit comics community".

In response to this, DC dropped Stewart from an unannounced project he was working on. W. Maxwell Prince and Martin Morazzo, creators of the Image Comics series Ice Cream Man, canceled Stewart's variant cover to the next issue of the series.

== Bibliography ==
=== Interior work ===
- Superman Adventures (DC Comics):
  - "22 Stories in a Single Bound" (with Mark Millar, among other artists, in #41, 2000)
  - "Four-Point Perspective" (with Dan Slott, in #57, 2001)
- The Invisibles vol. 3 #2: "The Moment of the Blitz" (with Grant Morrison, among other artists, Vertigo, 2000)
- The Dreaming #51: "Second Sight" (inks on Christian Højgaard, written by Caitlin R. Kiernan, Vertigo, 2000)
- Flinch #15: "A Night to Forget" (inks on Pander Brothers, written by Paul Jenkins, anthology, Vertigo, 2000)
- Scooby-Doo #37: "Witch Pitch" (with John Rozum, co-feature, DC Comics, 2000)
- Deadenders #9-16 (inks on Warren Pleece, written by Ed Brubaker, Vertigo, 2000–2001)
- The Crusades #5 (with Jason Moore — inks on Kelley Jones, written by Steven T. Seagle, Vertigo, 2001)
- Swamp Thing vol. 3 #17, 19-20 (inks on Giuseppe Camuncoli, written by Brian K. Vaughan, Vertigo, 2001)
- Detective Comics (DC Comics):
  - "Trail of the Catwoman, Part One" (inks on Darwyn Cooke, written by Ed Brubaker, co-feature, in vol. 1 #759, 2001)
  - "The Eleven Curious Cases of Batman" (with Peter Tomasi, among other artists, co-feature, in vol. 2 #50, 2016)
- Joker's Last Laugh Secret Files: "A Clown at Midnight" (inks on Pete Woods, written by Chuck Dixon and Scott Beatty, DC Comics, 2001)
- Batgirl: Secret Files & Origins: "Batgirl vs. Batgirl" (inks on Giuseppe Camuncoli, written by Scott Peterson, DC Comics, 2002)
- Hellblazer #168-169 (inks on Giuseppe Camuncoli, written by Brian Azzarello, Vertigo, 2002)
- Catwoman vol. 3 (with Ed Brubaker, DC Comics):
  - "Trickle Down Theory" (inks on Brad Rader, in #5, 2002)
  - "Disguises" (with Rick Burchett — inks on Brad Rader, in #6-7, 2002)
  - "Slam Bradley: The McSweeney Case" (in Secret Files & Origins, 2002)
  - "Relentless" (in #12-16, 2002–2003)
  - "Wild Ride 1-3" (in #20-22, with Nick Derington (#22), 2003)
  - "Wild Ride 4-5" (inks on Guy Davis, in #23-24, 2003)
- Tales of the Vampires #1: "Stacy" (with Joss Whedon, anthology, Dark Horse, 2003)
- B.P.R.D.: Bureau for Paranormal Research and Defense (with Mike Mignola, Dark Horse):
  - The Soul of Venice: "Another Day at the Office" (new story for the tpb, 2004)
  - Hell on Earth:
    - Exorcism #1-2 (script and art, 2012)
    - "The Exorcist" (plot; script by Chris Roberson, art by Mike Norton, in #140-142, 2016)
- Seaguy #1-3 + Seaguy: The Slaves of Mickey Eye #1-3 (with Grant Morrison, Vertigo, 2004; 2009)
- Tomorrow Stories Special: "Jonni Future" (with Steve Moore, anthology one-shot, America's Best Comics, 2005)
- Human Target vol. 2 #17: "You Made Me Love You" (with Peter Milligan, Vertigo, 2005)
- Seven Soldiers: Manhattan Guardian #1-4 (with Grant Morrison, DC Comics, 2005)
- The Other Side #1-4 (with Jason Aaron, Vertigo, 2006–2007)
- Sin Título (script and art, self-published webcomic, 2007–2012)
- Pushing Daisies #0: "You've Been Outbid" (with Bryan Fuller, Wildstorm, 2007)
- The Vinyl Underground #1-6 (inks on Simon Gane, written by Si Spencer, Vertigo, 2007–2008)
- The Apocalipstix (with Ray Fawkes, graphic novel, Oni Press, 2008)
- Batman and Robin (with Grant Morrison, DC Comics):
  - "Blackest Knight" (in #7-9, 2010)
  - "Black Mass" (with Frazer Irving and Chris Burnham, in #16, 2010)
- Prince of Persia: Before the Sandstorm (with Jordan Mechner and various artists, graphic novel, Disney Press, 2010)
- Suicide Girls #1-4 (inks on David Hahn, written by Steve Niles, Brea and Zane Austin Grant, IDW Publishing, 2011)
- Assassin's Creed (script and art, with Karl Kerschl):
  - The Fall #1–3 (Wildstorm, 2010–2011)
  - The Chain (graphic novel, Ubisoft, 2012)
  - Brahman (graphic novel, Ubisoft, 2013)
- Jim Henson's Tale of Sand (among other artists — inks on Ramón K. Pérez, graphic novel, Archaia, 2011)
- Batman Incorporated: Leviathan Strikes! (with Grant Morrison and Chris Burnham, one-shot, DC Comics, 2012)
- Thought Bubble Anthology #3: "One Night in Comicopolis" (script and art, with Brandon Graham, Image, 2013)
- Amazing X-Men #6: "All in the Family" (with Jason Aaron, Marvel, 2014)
- Guardians of the Galaxy vol. 3 #15 (with Brian Michael Bendis and Nick Bradshaw, Marvel, 2014)
- Action Comics vol. 2 #31: "Infected, Part One" (with Greg Pak, Aaron Kuder and Rafa Sandoval, DC Comics, 2014)
- Batgirl vol. 4 #35-50 (layouts + co-writer with Brenden Fletcher, art by Babs Tarr (#35-43, 45-46, 48-50), Irene Koh (short story in Secret Origins vol. 3 #10), Joel Gomez (#41), Jake Wyatt (#42), Michel Lacombe (#42-43), Bengal (#44, Endgame tie-in one-shot, Annual #3), David Lafuente (Annual #3), Mingjue Helen Chen (Annual #3), Ming Doyle (Annual #3 and #49), Rob Haynes (#46, 48), Moritat (#47), Eleonora Carlini (#47, 50), Horacio Domingues (#49), Roger Robinson (#49-50) and James Harvey (#49-50) and John Timms (#50), DC Comics, 2014–2016)
- The Multiversity: Thunderworld Adventures: "The Day That Never Was!" (with Grant Morrison, one-shot, DC Comics, 2015)
- Fight Club 2 #1-10 and Fight Club 3 #1-12 (with Chuck Palahniuk, Dark Horse, 2015–2016; 2019)
- Bartkira Volume 3 pages 277-281 (after Katsuhiro Otomo and Matt Groening, Internet art project, 2015)
- Motor Crush #0-11 (co-writer with Brenden Fletcher and artist on #7, art by Babs Tarr, Image, 2016–2018)
- Where We Live: "Stains" (script and art, anthology graphic novel, Image, 2018)
- Marvel Comics #1000: "Make Mine a Manhattan" (with Kurt Busiek, anthology, Marvel, 2019)
- The Amazing Spider-Man: Full Circle: "Part Seven" (with Jason Aaron, anthology one-shot, Marvel, 2019)

=== Cover work ===
- Green Arrow vol. 3 #33 (DC Comics, 2004)
- Batman: The 12 Cent Adventure #1 (DC Comics, 2004)
- Marvel Adventures: Spider-Man #17-20 (Marvel, 2006)
- Marvel Adventures: The Avengers #9-12 (Marvel, 2007)
- Wolverine: First Class #17 (Marvel, 2009)
- Uncanny X-Men: First Class #8 (Marvel, 2010)
- Batman: The Return of Bruce Wayne #4 (DC Comics, 2010)
- Batman Incorporated vol. 2 #2 (DC Comics, 2012)
- Happy! #2 (Image, 2012)
- Zero #6 (Image, 2014)
- Superman Unchained #5 (DC Comics, 2014)
- Black Market #1 (Boom! Studios, 2014)
- Batman/Superman #10 (DC Comics, 2014)
- Hack/Slash: Son of Samhain #1 (Image, 2014)
- Judge Dredd Megazine #349 (Rebellion, 2014)
- George Pérez's Sirens #1 (Boom! Studios, 2014)
- Supergirl vol. 5 #34 (DC Comics, 2014)
- Teen Titans vol. 5 #34 (DC Comics, 2014)
- Justice League United #5 (DC Comics, 2014)
- Captain Canuck vol. 2 #1 (Chapter House, 2015)
- Archie vol. 2 #1, 13 (Archie Comics, 2015–2016)
- Cry Havoc #1 (Image, 2016)
- Ms. Marvel vol. 4 #8-12 (Marvel, 2016)
- The Unbelievable Gwenpool #1 (Marvel, 2016)
- Civil War II: Choosing Sides #5-6 (Marvel, 2016)
- All-New Wolverine Annual #1 (Marvel, 2016)
- Star Wars: Poe Dameron #5 (Marvel, 2016)
- Klaus and the Witch of Winter #1 (Boom! Studios, 2016)
- Old Man Logan #31 (over John Buscema) (Marvel, 2018)
- Penthouse Comix #2 (2024)
