= Chris Burnham =

Comic book artist (born 1977)

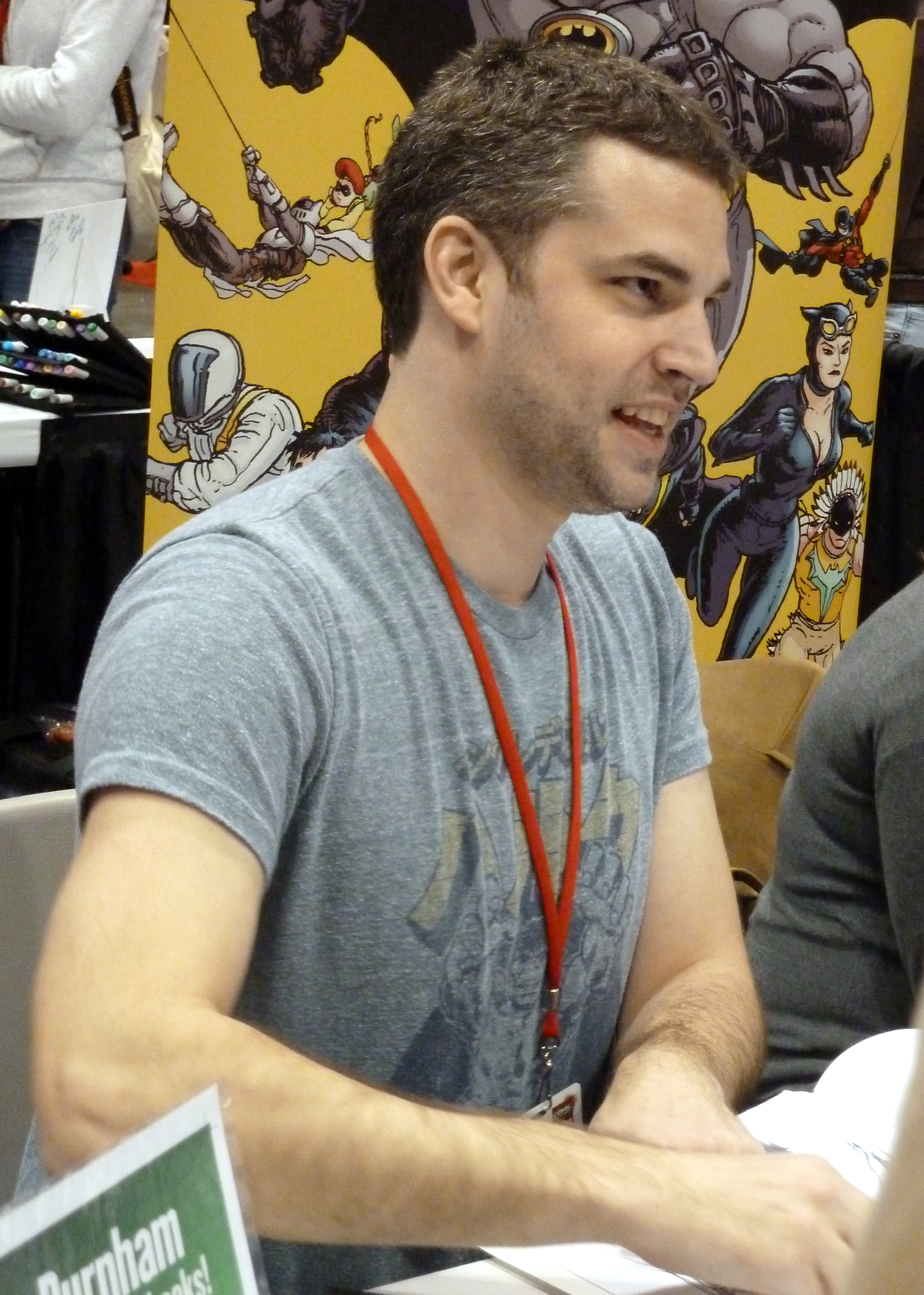
- Chris Burnham at C2E2, in April 2013
- Born: Christopher Burnham; November 9, 1977 (age 49)
- Area: Artist
- Notable works: Officer Downe; Batman, Inc.

Chris Burnham is a comic book artist known for his work on Batman Incorporated with Grant Morrison, as well as the creator-owned books such as Officer Downe and Nixon's Pals, which were published by Image Comics.

== Early life ==
Born in Connecticut, Burnham grew up in Pittsburgh, Pennsylvania, where he first discovered comics. He studied at George Washington University.

== Career ==
In 2002 Burnham moved to Chicago, where he started to work as a graphic designer. Since then he has produced work for DC Comics, Marvel, Image, Boom! Studios and Moonstone Books. A film called Officer Downe, based on Casey's comic, was released on November 18, 2016.

== Bibliography ==
Interior comic work includes:

- Kolchak (with Dave Ulanski, Moonstone Books):
  - Tales of the Night Stalker #3: "More Creatures of Habit" (anthology, 2003)
  - Black & White & Red All Over (framing sequence, one-shot, 2005)
- Moonstone Monsters (anthology one-shots, Moonstone Books):
  - Sea Creatures: "Croaked" (with Ben Raab, 2003)
  - Witches: "The Witch in the Woods" (with William Messner-Loebs, 2004)
- Valentine: The Safecracker's Tale (with Nathan Allen, webcomic, The House Theatre of Chicago, 2005)
- Boston Blackie: Bloody Shame: "Inside Out" (with Stefan Petrucha, graphic novel, Moonstone Books, 2005)
- Comiculture Anthology Volume 2: "Suffer the Salt" (script and art, anthology graphic novel, Mad Science Media, 2005)
- Ten Ton Studios' Jam Comic #1: "pages thirteen and twenty-five" (script and art, webcomic, Ten Ton Studios, 2005)
- Mystery Manor: Haunted Theatre #2-3: "Suicide Shift" (script and art, anthology, Silver Phoenix, 2006–2007)
- I Have 24 Hours to Live! (script and art, 24-hour webcomic, Ten Ton Studios, 2007)
- Elephantmen (with Richard Starkings, Image):
  - "Silent Running" (in #9, co-feature, 2007)
  - "Dark Heart" (in #16, 2009)
- Nixon's Pals (with Joe Casey, graphic novel, Image, 2008)
- Fear Agent #21: "A Mammoth Undertaker" (script and art, co-feature, Dark Horse, 2008)
- X-Men: Divided We Stand #2: "Idée Fixe" (with Duane Swierczynski, anthology, Marvel, 2008)
- X-Men: Manifest Destiny #1: "Boom" (with James Asmus, anthology, Marvel, 2008)
- Marvel Mystery Comics 70th Anniversary Special: "Project: Blockbuster!" (with Tom DeFalco, one-shot, Marvel, 2009)
- Days Missing #2: "September 12, 1815" (with David Hine, Archaia Studios, 2009)
- Hack/Slash (Devil's Due):
  - "Nightmare & Sleepy" (with Tim Seeley, in #29, co-feature, 2009)
  - "Butterface" (script, art by Stephen Molnar, in Trailers #2, anthology, 2010)
- Monster Truck (script and art, webcomic, self-published, 2009)
- Munden's Bar pages 45-52: "100 Years of Puberty" (with John Ostrander, anthology webcomic, ComicMix, 2010)
- The Amory Wars: In Keeping Secrets of Silent Earth 3 #1-7 (with Peter David and Claudio Sanchez, Boom! Studios, 2010)
- Officer Downe: "Tough Shit" (with Joe Casey, one-shot, Image, 2010)
- Snake Punch (script and art, 24-hour webcomic, Ten Ton Studios, 2010)
- Batman and Robin #16: "Black Mass" (with Grant Morrison, Cameron Stewart and Frazer Irving, DC Comics, 2011)
- Crack Comics #63: "A Matter of Some Gravity" (script and art, anthology, Image, 2011)
- Batman Incorporated (with Grant Morrison, DC Comics):
  - "Nyktomorph" (in vol. 1 #4 and 6-7, 2011)
  - Leviathan Strikes! (with Cameron Stewart, one-shot, 2011)
  - "Demon Star" (in vol. 2 #1-6, with Andres Guinaldo (#6), 2012–2013)
  - "Brand Building" (plot; dialogue by Grant Morrison, art by Frazer Irving, in vol. 2 #0, 2012)
  - "Most Wanted" (in vol. 2 #7-10 and 12-13, with Jason Masters (#7-10) and Andrei Bressan (#10), 2013)
  - "Interlude: A Bird in the Hand" (script, art by Jorge Lucas, in vol. 2 #11, 2012)
  - "Rending Machine" (script and art, in Batman Incorporated Special anthology one-shot, 2013)
- Heavy Metal #264: "Milk Run" (script and art, anthology, Metal Mammoth, 2013)
- 2000 AD Free Comic Book Day 2014: "Judge Dredd: The Badge" (with Matt Smith, anthology, Rebellion, 2014)
- The Savage Dragon vol. 2 #200: "Conquering Heroes!" (with Erik Larsen, co-feature, Highbrow Entertainment, 2014)
- Nameless #1-6 (with Grant Morrison, Image, 2015)
- Secret Wars: E is for Extinction #1-4 (co-writer with Dennis Culver, art by Ramon Villalobos, Marvel, 2015)
- Black Light District: "Bizarro" (with Will Knox and Jesse Blaze Snider, anthology webcomic, 2016)
- Detective Comics vol. 2 #50: "The Eleven Curious Cases of Batman" (with Peter Tomasi, among other artists, co-feature, DC Comics, 2016)
- The Mighty Thor #700 (with Jason Aaron, among other artists, Marvel, 2017)
- God Hates Astronauts: 3-D Cowboy's 2-D Spectacular!: "Criminowl Activity Fun!" (with Ryan Browne, anthology, Kickstarter, 2018)
- Die!Die!Die! #1-14 (with Robert Kirkman and Scott M. Gimple, Skybound, 2018–2021)
- Batman: Pennyworth RIP #1 (with Peter Tomasi, DC Comics, 2020)
- Detective Comics #1027 (with Grant Morrison, DC Comics, 2020)
- Justice League Incarnate #4 (with Joshua Williamson and Dennis Culver, DC Comics, 2022)
- Dark Crisis: Worlds Without a Justice League - Superman #1 (with Tom King, DC Comics, 2022)
- Batman: Urban Legends #18-20 (DC Comics, 2022)
- Unstoppable Doom Patrol 1-7 (with Dennis Culver, DC Comics, 2023)

=== Covers only ===
- The Amory Wars: In Keeping Secrets of Silent Earth 3 #8-12 (Boom! Studios, 2011)
- Batman Incorporated #8 (DC Comics, 2011)
- Batman and Robin #26 (DC Comics, 2011)
- Batman vol. 2 #5 (DC Comics, 2012)
- Action Comics vol. 2 #7 (DC Comics, 2012)
- Sword of Sorcery vol. 2 #3 (DC Comics, 2013)
- Batman: Li'l Gotham #1 (DC Comics, 2013)
- Zero #1 (Image, 2013)
- Liberator #4 (Black Mask Studios, 2013)
- Batman and Robin vol. 2 #23.1, 35 (DC Comics, 2013)
- Detective Comics vol. 2 #23.2, 27 (DC Comics, 2013–2014)
- Superman Unchained #4 (DC Comics, 2013)
- Damian: Son of Batman #2 (DC Comics, 2014)
- Batman: The Dark Knight vol. 2 #26-27 (DC Comics, 2014)
- The Multiversity #1 (DC Comics, 2014)
- God Hates Astronauts #3 (Image, 2014)
- Deadpool's Art of War #1 (Marvel, 2014)
- 2000 AD #1950, 2000 (Rebellion, 2015–2016)
- Klaus #1 (Boom! Studios, 2015)
- New Avengers vol. 4 #3 (Marvel, 2016)
- Deathstroke vol. 3 #16 (DC Comics, 2016)
- Lake of Fire #1 (Image, 2016)
- Jeff Steinberg: Champion of Earth #1 (Oni Press, 2016)
- Teen Titans vol. 6 #1-7 (DC Comics, 2016–2017)
- Future Quest #7 (Hanna-Barbera, 2017)
- The Dark Knight III: The Master Race #7 (DC Comics, 2017)
- All-Star Batman #9 (DC Comics, 2017)
- Batman/The Shadow #2 (DC Comics, 2017)
- The Flintstones #11 (Hanna-Barbera, 2017)
- Darkseid Special #1 (DC Comics, 2017)
- Old Man Logan #32 (Marvel, 2018)
- Superman vol. 4 #39 (DC Comics, 2018)
- Cable #157 (Marvel, 2018)
- Mighty Morphin Power Rangers: Shattered Grid #1 (Boom! Studios, 2018)
- Burnouts #1-5 (Image, 2018–2019)
- The Walking Dead #48 (Skybound, 2018)
- Hit-Girl vol. 2 #10 (Image, 2018)
- Night Moves #1-5 (IDW Publishing, 2018–2019)
- Batman vol. 3 #64-65 (DC Comics, 2019)
- The Flash vol. 5 #64-65 (DC Comics, 2019)
