= The Other Side (comics) =

- The Other Side #1 (December 2006), art by Cameron Stewart.

Publication information
- Publisher: DC Comics
- Schedule: Monthly
- Format: Miniseries
- Publication date: December 2006 - April 2007
- No. of issues: 5

Creative team
- Written by: Jason Aaron
- Penciller(s): Cameron Stewart
- Inker(s): Cameron Stewart
- Colorist(s): Dave McCaig

The Other Side is a five-issue 2006 Vietnam War-themed comic book miniseries published by American company DC Comics as a part of its Vertigo imprint. It was written by Jason Aaron and illustrated by Cameron Stewart. Stewart travelled to Vietnam to do extensive visual research.

== Plot ==
The comic tells parallel stories of an American Marine, PFC Bill Everette, and a North Vietnamese soldier, Vo Binh Dai, as they join their respective armies. As they fight for their countries, the horror of the war wears upon their soul and sanity.

== Collection ==
The Other Side was reprinted in a hardcover collection by Image Comics in 2017.

== Awards ==
The Other Side received 2007 Eisner Award nomination for Best Limited Series.
