= Grant Morrison =

Scottish comic book writer and playwright (born 1960)

Grant Morrison MBE
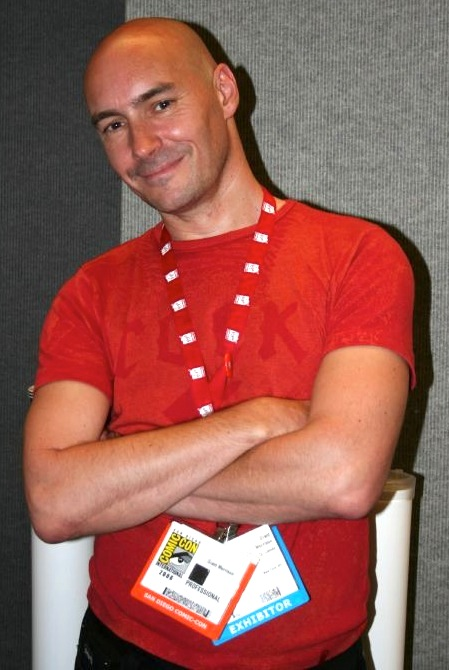
- Grant Morrison in 2009
- Born: 31 January 1960 (age 66) Glasgow, Scotland
- Area: Writer
- Notable works: Zenith; Animal Man; Doom Patrol; Arkham Asylum; The Invisibles; Flex Mentallo; JLA; New X-Men; The Filth; Seaguy; We3; Seven Soldiers; All-Star Superman; 52; Batman R.I.P.; Final Crisis; Batman and Robin; Batman Incorporated; Action Comics; The Multiversity
- Awards: Eagle Awards (1990, 2000, 2006, 2011, 2012); Eisner Awards (1990, 2006, 2007, 2009); Harvey Awards (1990, 2009); Inkpot Award (1990); MBE (2012); National Comics Award (1998, 2002)

Grant Morrison (born 31 January 1960) is a Scottish comic book writer, screenwriter, and producer. Their work is known for its nonlinear narratives, humanist philosophy and countercultural leanings. Morrison has written extensively for the American comic book publisher DC Comics, penning lengthy runs on Animal Man, Doom Patrol, JLA, Action Comics, and Green Lantern as well as the graphic novels Arkham Asylum, JLA: Earth 2, and Wonder Woman: Earth One, the meta-series Seven Soldiers and The Multiversity, the mini-series DC One Million and Final Crisis, both of which served as centrepieces for the eponymous company-wide crossover storylines, and the maxi-series All-Star Superman. Morrison's best known DC work is the seven-year Batman storyline which started in the Batman ongoing series and continued through Final Crisis, Batman and Robin, Batman: The Return of Bruce Wayne and two volumes of Batman Incorporated. They also co-created the DC character Damian Wayne.

Morrison's creator-owned work, the bulk of which was published through DC Comics' Vertigo imprint, includes Flex Mentallo and We3 with Scottish artist Frank Quitely, Seaguy with artist Cameron Stewart, The Filth with Chris Weston, and the three-volume series The Invisibles. At Marvel, Morrison wrote a three-year run on New X-Men and created Marvel Boy for the publisher's Marvel Knights imprint.

Between 2016 and 2018, Morrison served as the editor-in-chief of Heavy Metal magazine.

Morrison's work has drawn critical acclaim. They have won numerous awards, including Eisner, Harvey, and Inkpot awards. In 2012, Morrison was appointed Member of the Order of the British Empire (MBE) for services to film and literature.

== Early life ==
Grant Morrison was born in Glasgow, Scotland, in 1960. They were educated at Allan Glen's School where their first portfolio of art was rejected by their careers guidance teacher, who encouraged them to work in a bank. Their first published works were Gideon Stargrave strips for Near Myths in 1978 (when they were about 17), one of the first British alternative comics. Their work appeared in four of the five issues of Near Myths and they were suitably encouraged to find more comic work. This included a weekly comic strip, Captain Clyde, an unemployed superhero based in Glasgow, for The Govan Press, a local newspaper, plus various issues of DC Thomson's Starblazer, the science fiction counterpart to that company's Commando title.

== Career ==
=== 1980s ===
Morrison spent much of the early 1980s touring and recording with their band The Mixers, occasionally writing Starblazer for D.C. Thomson and contributing to various UK indie titles. In 1982, Morrison submitted a proposal involving the Justice League of America and Jack Kirby's New Gods entitled Second Coming to DC Comics, but it was not commissioned. After writing The Liberators for Dez Skinn's Warrior in 1985, Morrison started work for Marvel UK the following year. There they wrote comic strips for Doctor Who Magazine, the final one a collaboration with a then-teenage Bryan Hitch, as well as a run on the Zoids strip in Spider-Man and Zoids. 1986 also saw publication of Morrison's first of several two- or three-page Future Shocks for 2000 AD.

Morrison's first continuing serial began in 2000 AD in 1987, when they and Steve Yeowell created Zenith.

Morrison's work on Zenith brought them to the attention of DC Comics, who asked Morrison to work for them. They accepted Morrison's proposals for Animal Man, a little-known character from DC's past whose most notable recent appearance was a cameo in the Crisis on Infinite Earths limited series, and for a 48-page Batman one-shot that would eventually become Arkham Asylum: A Serious House on Serious Earth.

Animal Man put Morrison in line with the "British Invasion" of American comics, along with such writers as Neil Gaiman, Peter Milligan, Jamie Delano, and Alan Moore, who had launched the "invasion" with his work on Swamp Thing.

After impressing with Animal Man, Morrison was asked to take over Doom Patrol, starting their surreal take on the superhero genre with issue No. 19 in 1989. Morrison's Doom Patrol introduced concepts such as dadaism and the writings of Jorge Luis Borges into the first several issues. DC published Arkham Asylum: A Serious House on Serious Earth in 1989 as a 128-page graphic novel painted by Dave McKean. Comics historian Les Daniels observed in 1995 that "Arkham Asylum was an unprecedented success, selling 182,166 copies in hardcover and another 85,047 in paperback."

While working for DC Comics in America, Morrison kept contributing to British indie titles, writing St. Swithin's Day for Trident Comics. St. Swithin's Day's anti-Margaret Thatcher themes proved controversial, provoking a small tabloid press reaction and a complaint from Conservative Member of Parliament (MP) Teddy Taylor. The controversy continued with the publication of The New Adventures of Hitler in Scottish music and lifestyle magazine Cut in 1989, due to its use of Adolf Hitler as its lead character. The strip, unfinished when Cut folded, was reprinted and completed in Fleetway's 2000 AD spin-off title Crisis.

Two plays staged by Oxygen House at the Edinburgh Fringe had scripts by Morrison. Red King Rising (1989) concerned an imagined relationship between Lewis Carroll and Alice Liddell. The other, Depravity (1990) concerned the British occultist Aleister Crowley. The plays won between them a Fringe First Award, the Independent Theatre Award for 1989 and the Evening Standard Award for New Drama.

=== 1990s ===
Morrison returned to Batman with the "Gothic" story arc in issues 6–10 of the Batman title Batman: Legends of the Dark Knight. The early 1990s saw Morrison revamping Kid Eternity for DC with artist Duncan Fegredo, and Dan Dare, with artist Rian Hughes. Morrison coloured Dare's bright future with Thatcherism in Fleetway's Revolver.

In 1991 Morrison wrote Bible John-A Forensic Meditation for Fleetway's Crisis, based on an analysis of possible motivations for the crimes of the serial killer Bible John. Covering similar themes to Alan Moore and Eddie Campbell's From Hell, the work utilised cut-up techniques, a Ouija board and collage rather than conventional panels to tell the story.

In 1993 Morrison, fellow Glaswegian comic writer Mark Millar and John Smith were asked to reinvigorate 2000 AD for an eight-week run called "The Summer Offensive". Morrison wrote Judge Dredd and Really and Truly, and co-wrote the controversial Big Dave with Millar.

DC Comics launched its Vertigo imprint in 1993, publishing several of Morrison's creator-owned projects, such as the steampunk mini-series Sebastian O and the graphic novel The Mystery Play. 1995 saw the release of Kill Your Boyfriend, with artist Philip Bond, originally published as a Vertigo Voices one-shot. In 1996 Morrison wrote Flex Mentallo, a Doom Patrol spin-off with art by Frank Quitely, and returned briefly to DC Universe superheroics with the short-lived Aztek, co-written with Mark Millar.

In 1996, Morrison was given the Justice League of America to revamp as JLA, a comic book that gathered the "Big Seven" superheroes of the DC universe into one team. This run was hugely popular and returned the title to best-selling status. Morrison wrote several issues of The Flash with Mark Millar, as well as DC's crossover event of 1998, the four-issue mini-series DC One Million, in addition to plotting many of the multiple crossovers.

With the three volumes of the creator-owned The Invisibles, Morrison started their largest and possibly most important work. The Invisibles combined political, pop- and sub-cultural references. Tapping into pre-millennial tension, the work was influenced by the writings of Robert Anton Wilson, Aleister Crowley and William Burroughs, and Morrison's practice of chaos magic in Thee Temple ov Psychick Youth. In 1998 Morrison published the prose piece "I'm A Policeman" in Sarah Champion's millennial short story collection Disco 2000; though no explicit connection to The Invisibles is made, there are strong thematic links between the two works. At DisinfoCon in 1999, Morrison said that much of the content in The Invisibles was information given to them by aliens that abducted them in Kathmandu, who told them to spread this information to the world via a comic book. They later clarified that the experience they labelled as the "Alien Abduction Experience in Kathmandu" had nothing to do with aliens or abduction, but that there was an experience that they had in Kathmandu that The Invisibles is an attempt to explain. The title was not a huge commercial hit to start with. (Morrison actually asked their readers to participate in a "wankathon" while concentrating on a magical symbol, or sigil, in an effort to boost sales). When the title was relaunched with volume two, the characters relocated to America. Volume three appeared with issue numbers counting down, signalling an intention to conclude the series with the turn of the new millennium in 2000. Due to the title shipping late, its final issue did not ship until April 2000.

The 1999 film The Matrix has numerous elements which have been attributed by critics to the influence of Morrison's The Invisibles. Morrison was immediately struck by the similarities to their own work upon first seeing the film.

=== 2000s ===
In 2000, Morrison's graphic novel JLA: Earth 2 was released with art by Frank Quitely. It was Morrison's last mainstream work for DC for a while, as they moved to Marvel Comics. While at Marvel, Morrison wrote the six-part Marvel Boy series, and Fantastic Four: 1234, their take on another major superhero team. In July 2001, they began writing the main X-Men title, renamed New X-Men for their run, with Quitely providing much of the art. Again, Morrison's revamping of a major superhero team proved to be a commercial success, with the title jumping to the No. 1 sales spot and established Morrison as the kind of creator whose name on a title would guarantee sales. Their penultimate arc "Planet X" depicted the villain Magneto infiltrating and defeating the X-Men in the guise of new character Xorn and developing an addiction to the power-enhancing drug "Kick".

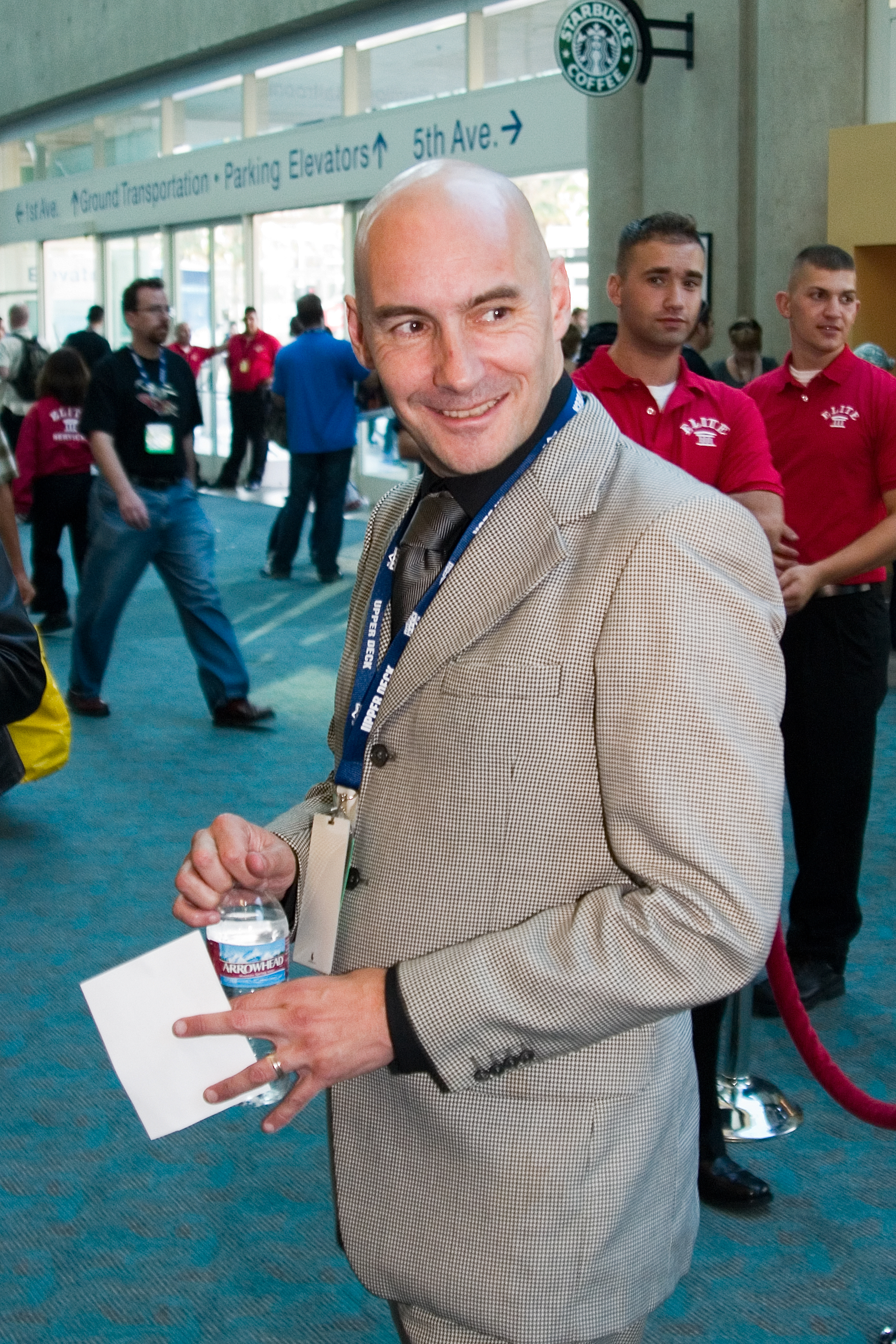
Morrison at the 2008 San Diego Comic-Con

In 2002, Morrison launched their next creator-owned project at Vertigo: The Filth, drawn by Chris Weston and Gary Erskine, a 13-part mini-series. That same year, Morrison sold the screenplay Sleepless Knights to DreamWorks with Guillermo del Toro attached to direct. Around the same time, Morrison was working on the script for the sequel to the Marvel Boy mini-series, but the project ultimately failed to materialize. In 2004, Vertigo published three Morrison mini-series. Seaguy, We3, and Vimanarama. Morrison returned to the JLA with the first story in a new anthology series, JLA Classified.

In 2005 Morrison wrote Seven Soldiers, which featured the Manhattan Guardian, Mister Miracle, Klarion the Witch Boy, Bulleteer, Frankenstein, Zatanna and Shining Knight. The series consists of seven interlinked four-issue mini-series with two "bookend" volumes – 30 issues in all. Dan DiDio, the editorial vice president of DC Comics, was impressed with Morrison's ideas for revitalising many of DC's redundant characters. Giving them the unofficial title of "revamp guy", DiDio asked them to assist in sorting out the DC Universe in the wake of the Infinite Crisis. Morrison was one of the writers on 52, a year-long weekly comic book series that started in May 2006 and concluded in May 2007.

Starting in November 2005, DC published All-Star Superman, a twelve-issue story arc by Morrison and Frank Quitely. Not so much a revamp or reboot of Superman, the series presents an out-of-continuity "iconic" Superman for new readers. All-Star Superman won the Eisner Award for Best New Series in 2006, the Best Continuing Series Eisner Award in 2007 and several Eagle Awards in the UK. It won three Harvey Awards in 2008 and the Eisner Award for Best Continuing Series in 2009. In the same year, Morrison and Quitely worked on pop star Robbie Williams' album Intensive Care, providing intricate Tarot card designs for the packaging and cover of the CD.

Morrison provided outline story and script work for two video games, Battlestar Galactica (2003) and Predator: Concrete Jungle (2005), both by Vivendi Universal. In 2006, New Line Cinema optioned We3 as a film project with Morrison attached as screenwriter. The following year, Morrison wrote the adaptation of the video game Area 51 home console game for Paramount in development with CFP Productions producing.

In 2006 Morrison was voted as the No. 2 favourite comic book writer of all time by Comic Book Resources. That same year, Morrison began writing Batman for DC with issue No. 655, reintroducing the character of Damian Wayne and signalling the beginning of a seven-year-long run on the character across multiple titles. They wrote relaunches of The Authority and Wildcats, with the art of Gene Ha and Jim Lee respectively, for DC's Wildstorm imprint. WildC.A.T.S. went on hiatus after one issue, The Authority was discontinued after two. The scheduling of The Authority conflicted with 52 and Morrison was unhappy with the reviews: "And then I saw the reviews on issue one and I just thought 'fuck this'." It eventually concluded without Morrison's involvement in Keith Giffen's The Authority: The Lost Year.

At the 2007 San Diego Comic-Con, DC Comics announced that Morrison would write Final Crisis, a seven-issue mini-series slated to appear in 2008 with J. G. Jones handling the art. Morrison announced that 2008 would see publication of the follow-up to 2004's Seaguy called Seaguy 2: The Slaves of Mickey Eye, the second part of a planned three part series.

At the 2008 New York Comic Con, Morrison announced they would be working with Virgin Comics to produce "webisodes" (short animated stories) based on the Mahābhārata; it would not be a direct translation but, "Like the Beatles took Indian music and tried to make psychedelic sounds... I'm trying to convert Indian storytelling to a western style for people raised on movies, comics, and video games." In August 2009, Morrison and Frank Quitely launched the Batman and Robin series.

=== 2010s ===
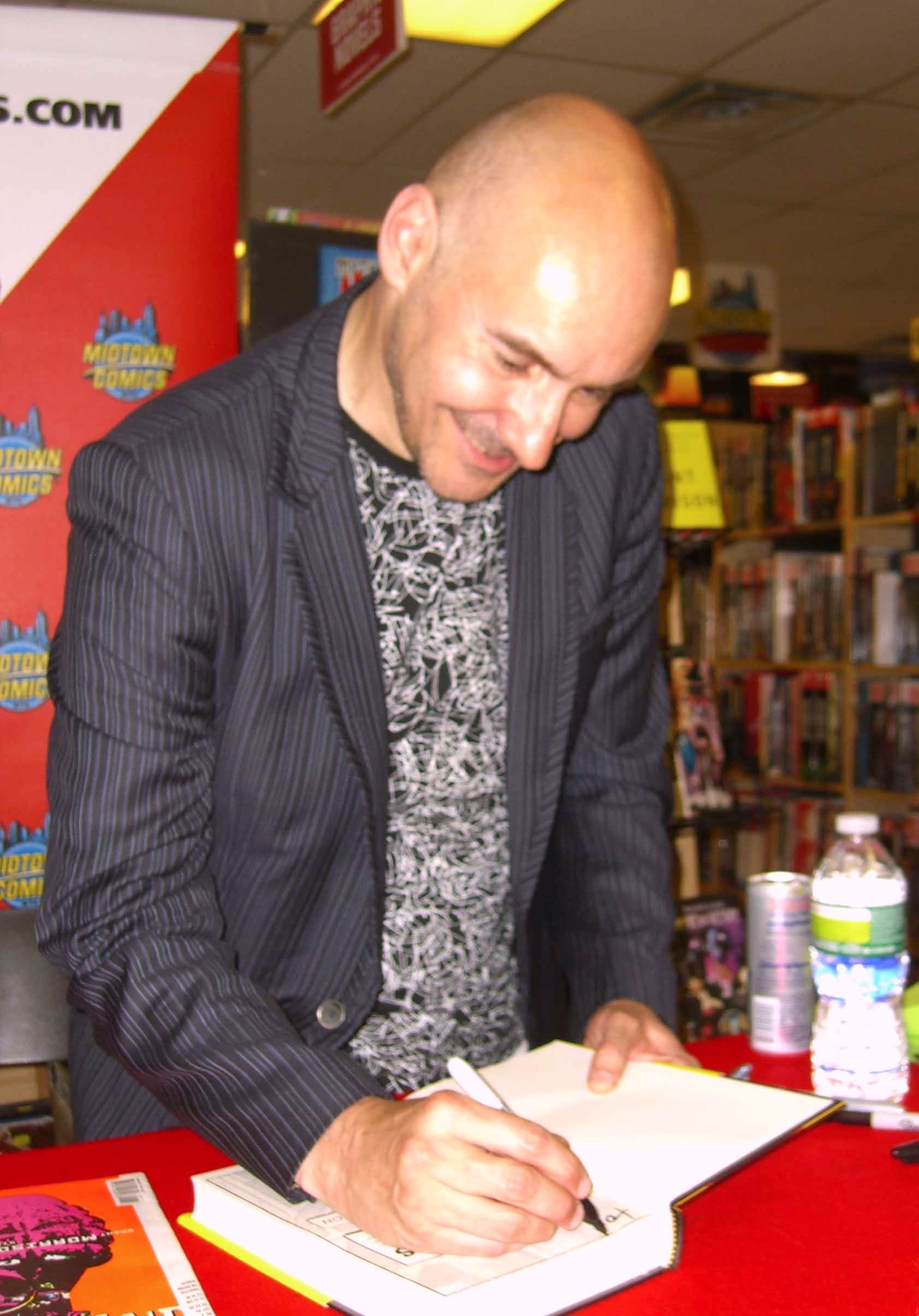
Morrison signing copies of their 2011 superhero analysis, Supergods, at Midtown Comics in Manhattan, 19 July 2011

Batman No. 700 (Aug. 2010) saw the return of Morrison to the title and a collaboration with an art team that consisted of Tony Daniel, Frank Quitely, Andy Kubert, and David Finch. The separate stories tied together to illustrate that the legacy of Batman is unending, and will survive into the future. At San Diego Comic-Con in 2010 it was announced that Grant Morrison would be leaving Batman and Robin with No. 16 and launching a new series entitled Batman Incorporated with revolving artists starting with Yanick Paquette. A more team-oriented Batman book inspired by the Batman: The Brave and the Bold animated series, Batman Incorporated builds on Morrison's work dating back to "Batman and Son" and Final Crisis, with Bruce Wayne creating an international Batman franchise all over the world. The series suffered from slow scheduling and was ended after eight issues while the DC Universe was rebooted in 2011; to bridge the gap a prestige book was released that featured two issues together along with a synopsis that recapped the story so far. In mid-2012, a second volume of the comic was launched with Chris Burnham on artwork, scheduled for 12 issues. Morrison left the Batman titles in 2013. They killed the Damian Wayne character in Batman Incorporated No. 8 (April 2013) and their final issue was No. 13 (Sept. 2013).

Morrison returned to creator-owned work in 2010 with the eight issue Vertigo series Joe the Barbarian, launched in January with artist Sean Murphy. Originally a six issue series, Morrison felt that the story would benefit from an extra two issues. The titular Joe is a diabetic young boy who begins to hallucinate a fantasy world populated with his toys and other fantasy characters when he stops taking his medication.

Following the closure of Virgin Comics, Dynamite Entertainment and Liquid Comics announced a partnership to publish a hardcover of illustrated scripts of Grant Morrison's Mahābhārata-based, animated project 18 Days with illustrations by artist Mukesh Singh, that was released in August 2010. They are the subject of a feature-length documentary titled Grant Morrison: Talking with Gods. The documentary features extensive interviews with Morrison as well as a number of comic artists, editors and professionals they have worked closely with. Talking with Gods was produced by Sequart Organization and was released in 2010 at San Diego Comic-Con.

Another 2010 project was Bonnyroad, a science fiction television series pitched by Morrison to the BBC Morrison pitched with director Paul McGuigan and Stephen Fry.

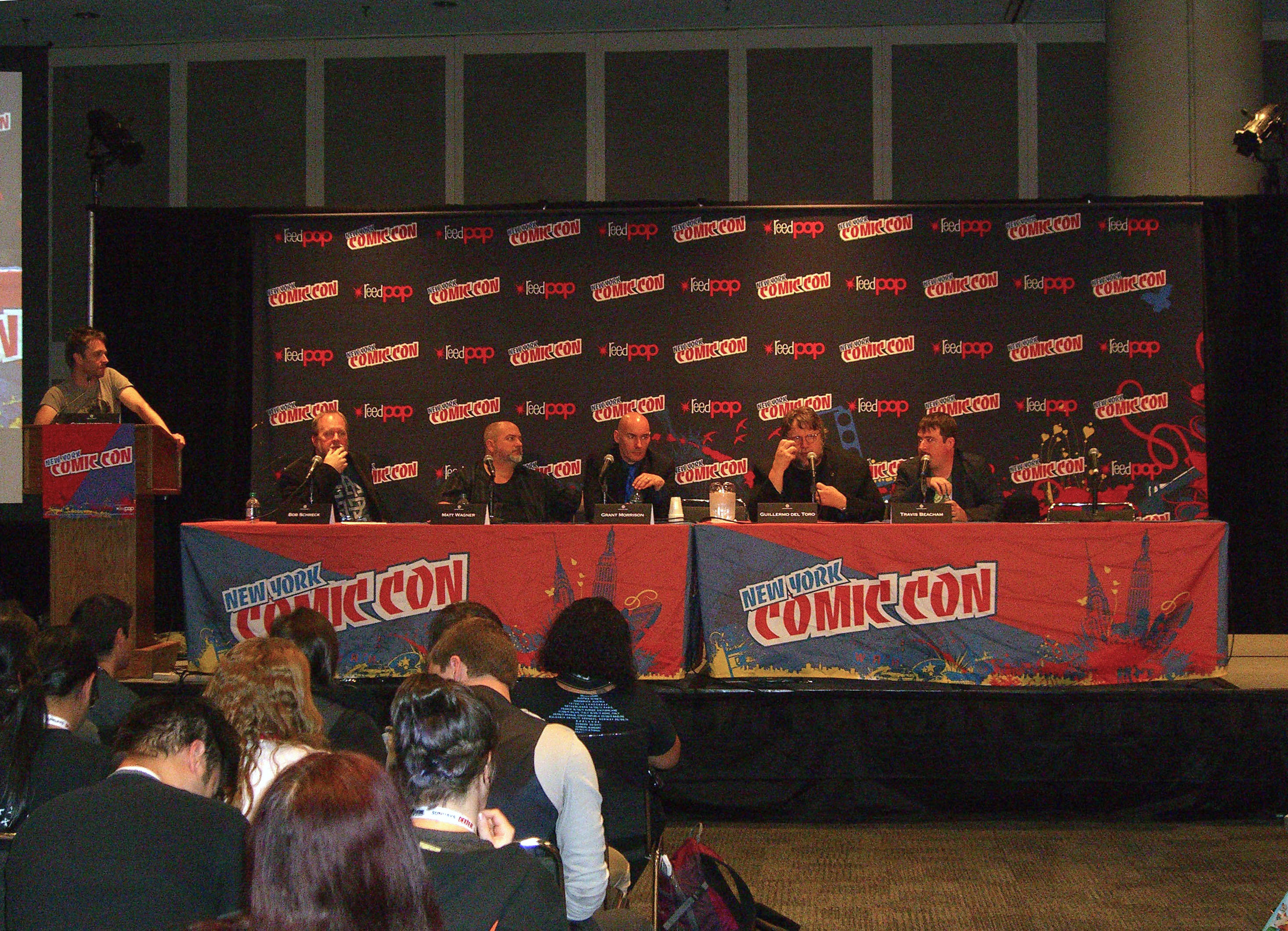
Morrison (fourth from left) at the Legendary Comics panel at the 2012 New York Comic Con. Also on stage, from left to right: Bob Schreck, Matt Wagner, Guillermo del Toro and Travis Beacham.

In June 2011, as part of DC Comics' massive revamp of its entire superhero line, Morrison was announced as the writer on the new Action Comics No. 1, teaming with artist Rags Morales, marking Morrison's return to the Superman character after the end of All-Star Superman.

In July 2011, Morrison's analysis of superheroes, Supergods: Our World in the Age of the Superhero, was published by Random House Spiegel & Grau in the United States and Jonathan Cape in the UK.

Morrison wrote a screenplay for a film named Sinatoro. In 2011 they worked on the screenplay Dinosaurs vs Aliens for Sam Worthington's production company, Full Clip Production, and said they planned to work with them again on a screenplay based on the 2000 AD story "Rogue Trooper".

Morrison was appointed Member of the Order of the British Empire (MBE) in the 2012 Birthday Honours for services to film and literature.

In September 2012, Morrison published their first ever Image Comics creator-owned work: Happy! with Darick Robertson. In the same month, MorrisonCon was held at the Hard Rock Hotel and Casino (Las Vegas). This small-scale convention, curated by Morrison, featured a number of comics industry guests, including Robert Kirkman, Darick Robertson, Jason Aaron, Jim Lee, Gerard Way, Jonathan Hickman, Frank Quitely, J. H. Williams III, and Chris Burnham.

In September 2014, as part of Legendary Comics' big foray into the industry, Morrison launched another key creator-owned book: Annihilator with Frazer Iving. A six-issue mini-series, Annihilator was informed by the writings of Thomas Ligotti, and other nihilistic philosophers, and played with the idea of the satanic archetype. A work of cosmic horror, it stars a monstrous Hollywood screenwriter named Ray Spass in his attempts to finish the script for the next tentpole blockbuster, while coming into contact with the character he's writing about: the diabolical Max Nomax, The Devil himself.

In February 2015, Morrison's second Image project ever launched in the creator-owned title Nameless, with frequent collaborator Chris Burnham. A tale of apocalyptic cosmic horror, Nameless sought to approach the genre from a new lens, with different influences, rather than lean to its iconic founder H.P Lovecraft, drawing on everything from the Tarot to The Qlippoth.

In November 2015, Morrison began their biggest creator-owned project of the decade, collaborating with BOOM! Studios for the very first time to do Klaus with Dan Mora and Ed Dukeshire.

Morrison's The Multiversity project for DC was published in 2014 and 2015. A metaseries of nine one-shots set in some of the 52 worlds in the DC Multiverse, it included the main Multiversity title which involves the return of President Calvin Ellis, the black Superman from Earth 23 originally seen in Action Comics vol. 2 No. 9, which was the framing for the whole series. Other issues include The Society of Super-Heroes a pulp version of the DC characters; The Just – set on a world of celebrity youngsters; Pax Americana, drawn by Frank Quitely, Thunder World – a Captain Marvel book; the Multiversity Guidebook; Mastermen – which includes a fascist version of the Justice League. and Ultra Comics.

In 2016, Morrison became editor-in-chief of the comics anthology Heavy Metal. Their involvement lasted until 2018. During the period, they penned such strips as Industria, The Rise and Fall of Empires, both with frequent collaborator and old friend Rian Hughes. Other strips included The Smile of the Absent Cat with artist Gerhard, as well as Mythopia, Beachhead, Option 3, Nihilophilia, Ten Sounds That Represent a Kind of Person: A Historical Parody, The House of Heart's Desire, and Beyond the Word and the Fool, with many others. Morrison also penned several editorials for the magazine during this period, whilst writing occasional prose stories for Ahoy Comics backup features.

In 2017, Morrison co-created the Syfy TV series Happy!, which starred Christopher Meloni and Patton Oswalt. It commenced its second season in 2019.

In November 2018, Morrison and artist Liam Sharp launched the series The Green Lantern for DC Comics. Following the success of that book's "first season", a second season was announced, to be published in 2020, after a Blackstars miniseries, debuting in November 2019, that dealt with the ending of Season One.

=== 2020s ===
"Season Two" of Morrison's Green Lantern series with Liam Sharp began in 2020 and completed in March 2021 alongside the release of their third and final volume of the Wonder Woman: Earth One series.

Morrison co-created and worked as a writer and producer on the 2020 TV series Brave New World for the Peacock Streaming Service, having developed it for adaptation.

In early 2021, it was announced that a new comic called Proctor Valley Road would be released, developed by Morrison in partnership with NBCUniversal. NBCUniversal's UCP, a division of Universal Studio Group, will also adapt the series for television. The first issue was published by Boom! Studios in March 2021.

In March 2021 it was announced that Morrison would write a four-issue series entitled Superman and The Authority, illustrated by Mikel Janin, to be published by DC in late 2021.

In a 2022 newsletter, Morrison revealed they had pitched ideas for Series 8 of Doctor Who to series showrunner Steven Moffat. These included a story featuring a child version of the Doctor, as well as a new potential villain. None were commissioned, though the BBC offered to buy the rights to Morrison's villains. (The latter declined). Later that year, Morrison published Luda, their debut prose novel.

In May 2025, it was announced that Morrison would be penning the crossover one-shot Batman/Deadpool. The one-shot, illustrated by Dan Mora, would mark the first time Marvel and DC's characters would properly crossover with each other since JLA/Avengers. It was published by DC on November 19, 2025. It was accompanied by another one-shot, published by Marvel, entitled Deadpool/Batman, written by Zeb Wells and illustrated by Greg Capullo.

== Personal life ==
In a 2011 interview, Morrison stated that they and their wife Kristan had no children. When asked if they regretted this, Morrison replied, "Slightly but I don't know. Every time I think of it I think of the reality of it. I really like kids and I get on with them and it's that aspect of it but I see people with actual kids. The trauma and the trouble. And if I'm worried that my cat is sick it's the thought of everyday worrying about a kid would be even more hellish."

Morrison is a believer and practitioner of chaos magic. They have claimed to have been abducted by aliens in 1994 in Kathmandu, having traveled there with the intent of being abducted.

Morrison uses singular they pronouns. In a 2020 interview with Mondo2000, Morrison mentioned that they "had been non-binary, cross-dressing, 'gender queer'", from the age of 10 years old but didn't have the vocabulary to describe how they felt at the time. Speaking later of the article, Morrison said that they hated being perceived as only recently coming out: "I'm 62 years old—I had my sexuality shit figured out a long time ago!" Morrison later said they rejected labels and that "I can't live in a box. I'm going to let down anyone who sticks a label on me. It will drop off quite naturally." They later wrote that though they do not use the label non-binary, they acknowledge that, depending on the definition, "perhaps the shoe fits after all". They also wrote that while they never requested to be referred to by they/them pronouns, they have come to prefer them. However, they do not mind being referred to with he/him pronouns.

== Appearances in media ==
Grant Morrison first appeared as a comics character in cameos in Animal Man Nos. 11 and 14. They made a full appearance at the end of issue No. 25 in 1990, and spent most of issue No. 26 in a lengthy conversation with the comic's title character. The character appeared the next year in Suicide Squad No. 58, written by John Ostrander, as a character named Writer who was one of several minor characters killed in one of the series' trademark suicide missions. Writer returned in the 2025 crossover comic Batman/Deadpool, written by Morrison, where the character encounters Batman, Deadpool and Morrison's own creations Damian Wayne and Cassandra Nova. Morrison was also depicted in an issue of Simpsons Comics, fighting with fellow X-Men writer Mark Millar.

In Morrison's 2005–2006 Seven Soldiers miniseries and its tie-ins, Morrison appears as the renegade member of eight "reality engineers" and transforms into Silver Age character Zor, then back into a character resembling Morrison in a magician's costume, though with dark hair and a beard. After the renegade's defeat, Morrison, wearing a DC Comics-logo tie clip, becomes the narrator for the final chapter. The miniseries Tales of the Unexpected features Morrison along with their 52 co-writers Geoff Johns, Greg Rucka and Mark Waid. In Darwyn Cooke's DC: The New Frontier, Morrison was the physical model for Captain Cold.

Morrison also appeared as themself in the ninth episode of the fourth season of Titans, titled "Dude, Where's My Gar?"

== Adaptations of Morrison's work ==
Film and television adaptations of Grant Morrison comics
Year	Title	Notes
2010	Justice League: Crisis on Two Earths	Animated film Based on JLA: Earth 2
2011	All-Star Superman	Animated film Based on All-Star Superman
2014	Son of Batman	Animated film Based on Batman and Son
2017–2019	Happy!	Live-action series Based on Happy!
2019–2023	Doom Patrol	Live-action series Based on Doom Patrol
2024–present	X-Men '97	Animated series Based in part on New X-Men
2025	Superman	Live-action film Based in part on All-Star Superman

== Awards ==
- Inkpot Award
- Order of the British Empire (MBE)

== Bibliography ==
Preceded by n/a	Animal Man writer 1988–1990	Succeeded by Peter Milligan
Preceded by Paul Kupperberg	Doom Patrol writer 1989–1993	Succeeded by Rachel Pollack
Preceded by Gerard Jones (Justice League America); Christopher Priest (Justice League Task Force); Robert Washington III (Extreme Justice)	JLA writer 1997–2000	Succeeded by Mark Waid
Preceded by Mark Waid; Brian Augustyn	The Flash writer 1997–1998 (with Mark Millar)	Succeeded by Mark Waid; Brian Augustyn
Preceded by Scott Lobdell (X-Men vol. 2)	New X-Men writer 2001–2004	Succeeded by Chuck Austen
Preceded by James Robinson	Batman writer 2006–2009	Succeeded by Judd Winick
Preceded by Robbie Morrison	Wildcats writer 2006	Succeeded by Christos Gage
Preceded by Ed Brubaker	The Authority writer 2006–2007	Succeeded by Christos Gage
Preceded by n/a	Batman and Robin writer 2009–2010	Succeeded by Paul Cornell
Preceded by Tony Daniel	Batman writer 2010	Succeeded by Tony Daniel
Preceded by Paul Cornell	Action Comics writer 2011–2013	Succeeded by Greg Pak
Preceded by Robert Venditti (Hal Jordan and the Green Lantern Corps); Dan Jurgens (Green Lanterns)	Green Lantern writer 2019–2021	Succeeded by Geoffrey Thorne (Green Lantern vol. 6)
