= Seaguy =

Comic book series published by DC Comics

- The cover of the first Seaguy trade paperback.

Publication information
- Publisher: Vertigo
- Schedule: Monthly
- Format: Limited series
- Publication date: July 2004 - current
- No. of issues: 6 (two 3-issue miniseries)

Creative team
- Created by: Grant Morrison; Cameron Stewart
- Written by: Grant Morrison
- Artist: Cameron Stewart
- Colorist(s): Peter Doherty; Dave Stewart

Collected editions
- Seaguy: ISBN 1-4012-0494-5

Seaguy is a three-volume comic book miniseries written by Grant Morrison with art by Cameron Stewart and published by the Vertigo imprint of DC Comics. The first volume of Seaguy was released in three issues beginning on May 19, 2004. The second volume, Slaves of Mickey Eye, was released in three issues beginning on April 1, 2009. The third and final volume, Seaguy Eternal, is yet to be published.

The story revolves around Seaguy, an unpowered superhero in a scuba suit, and his best friend and sidekick Chubby Da Choona, a talking, cigar-smoking tuna.

== Publication history ==
Morrison has expressed on various occasions that Seaguy represents a deliberate effort to move away from conventions of the current era of comics: "I had the idea to develop Seaguy into a weapon I could use to fight back against the trendy and unconvincing 'bad-ass' cynicism of current comics, most of which are produced by the most un-'bad-ass' men you can possibly imagine". Morrison believes that in this fashion the work represents a new vanguard in the development of comics. Morrison expressed similar sentiments about Zenith, one of the earliest series they worked on, when they said that it "was a reaction against torment superheroes".

Seaguy was planned as a trilogy, the second and third volumes were to be entitled "The Slaves of Mickey Eye" and "Seaguy Eternal" respectively, but due to the lower-than-expected sales of the comic, it was thought that the sequels were unlikely to be published. In 2006, a fan reported to a comics rumor column that Morrison was holding DC Comics' 52 weekly limited series for ransom. They reportedly offered to help write the series as long as they allowed him to go forward on the Seaguy sequel.

In April 2008, Morrison said that both sequels would go ahead and gave an overview of the ideas they have about the different parts:

I originally thought about it as three books. The first book was his childhood. And it's the idea that you're quite ignorant and you just want to have adventures. And you have all your talking pals and imaginary friends. So that was the child Seaguy. This is the teenage version of Seaguy. It's quite dark and gloomy and glossy and weird but it's quite funny, as well. And the final one is a mature adult, so it's a different version again. But it's basically just this guy growing up and finding out the truth about things.

The first sequel, Seaguy: The Slaves of Mickey Eye, was released on April 1, 2009 by DC Comics/Vertigo.

Morrison has expanded on the broader themes:

By the time we get into the third book, it's quite a serious superhero story. This is my Watchmen, really. This is where I'm really getting to talk about the idea of the superhero. It's kind of a conspiracy story. It's something like The Prisoner. We're starting to see more and more about what actually happens. This series is a transition from the world we're living in today into the world of Seaguy, which is taking place maybe 50 or 70 years in the future. So believe it or not, it's actually quite realistic in the end in the sense that it's going to explore how the world got that way and why it got that way and the real piece of crap that's behind it all. It's a big superhero book. The thing that it's closest to of my previous work is All-Star Superman.

== Plot ==
Seaguy is a super-hero who has never really had an adventure and spends his days in New Venice playing chess with Death, watching Mickey Eye (a cartoon show about an all-seeing, all-knowing, psychopathic eye, and an obvious spoof on Mickey Mouse) and going to the Mickey Eye amusement park. He constantly expresses his wish to go on adventures and impress a beautiful bearded warrior woman named She-Beard, but he never seems to get around to it because he's told the world doesn't need heroes anymore. When Seaguy and Chubby discover that a new food staple called Xoo is sentient, they decide to protect it from evil forces and bring it home.

Seaguy exists in a seemingly perfect world in which all the super-heroes no longer save lives or do much of anything except ride the rides at the Mickey Eye amusement park. It is public knowledge that all the evil in the world was finally destroyed after a powerful entity called the Anti-Dad was destroyed by all the super-heroes, effectively leaving the heroes without jobs. The style of the book is equal parts dark tragedy and light-hearted whimsy as the main character travels from one adventure to the other, but with each adventure becoming more tragic than the one before it, until Seaguy discovers the secret history of the moon.

== Collected editions ==
The first volume has been collected into a trade paperback:

- Seaguy (104 pages, 2005, ISBN 1-4012-0494-5)
