= Sin Titulo =

2007 mystery webcomic

- Cover
- Author: Cameron Stewart
- Current status/schedule: Complete
- Genre: Mystery

Sin Titulo is a mystery webcomic by Cameron Stewart, following the supernatural experiences of protagonist Alex Mackay. Launched in 2007, the webcomic completed its run in 2012 and got a Dark Horse Comics print publication in 2013. Sin Titulo won a Joe Shuster Award in 2009 and an Eisner Award in 2010.

== Content ==
The webcomic Sin Titulo follows protagonist Alex Mackay, who, at the start of the story, discovers a photograph of an unfamiliar woman in his grandfather's possessions and feels compelled to hunt her down. This leads him to an underworld populated by mysterious and strange concepts, such as an eerie laboratory and a femme fatale. Lauren Davis of ComicsAlliance described Sin Tutilo as a "noir fantasy": though it suggests the existence of science fiction concepts such as interdimensional travel and "shared cognitive space", many of its visuals are akin to those of a detective novel.

== Development ==
Sin Titulo was launched by Cameron Stewart as a webcomic in 2007 and eventually finished in 2012. Stewart did the writing, illustrations, lettering, and coloring for the work all on his own. The webcomic started as an "exercise in improvisation", its ambiguous title Sin Titulo literally meaning "Without Title" in Spanish. Many ideas for the story coalesced halfway through, when Stewart got a stronger grasp of what the webcomic was about. In 2011, Sin Titulo went on hiatus for almost a full year, keeping its readers in suspense.

Stewart told Davis of ComicsAlliance at the New England Webcomics Weekend in 2009, when Sin Titulo was still fairly young, that the webcomic is inspired by a disquieting experience he had as a child; one he's never been able to explain. He told Davis that he did not want Sin Titulo to turn out like the television series Lost, which was still airing at the time and which disappointed him for not answering all of the questions it set up. Though Stewart did not intend for it to be an autobiographical work, many aspects of the webcomic are based on his own experiences, including the sudden death of a neglected grandfather.

A strong influence of Sin Titulo is the work of David Lynch. In an interview with Newsarama, Stewart stated that he admires Lynch for his ability to provoke a sense of horror through surrealistic imagery that, to him, feels deeply honest. Stewart said that "I find his work so terrifying because on some primal level I feel like its revealing some dark and indescribable truth with complete sincerity." This is a quality he attempted to emulate in his webcomic.

On September 25, 2013, a print edition of Sin Titulo was released by Dark Horse Comics. Though the webcomic was still available for free online, the comic book compilation became a best-selling album.

== Reception ==
Lauren Davis praised Sin Titulo in 2012 for how it weaved its story threads together at the end and for its "slightly disorienting" style, allowing its readers to experience Alex' trials alongside him. Hillary Brown of Paste Magazine noted that the webcomic's atmosphere and moments of fear provoke stronger emotions than the mechanics of its plot. Brown praised Stewart for his ability to capture the feeling of being unsure whether you're awake or asleep, but criticized the manner in which he set up and eventually resolves the mysteries in Sin Titulo, stating that "doesn’t quite do them justice."

Stewart won a Joe Shuster Award in 2009 in the category "Webcomics" for his work on Sin Titulo. The following year, Stewart won an Eisner Award in the "Best Digital Comic" category.
