= Batman: The Return of Bruce Wayne =

American superhero comics

- Cover of Batman: The Return of Bruce Wayne deluxe edition, art by Andy Kubert.

Publication information
- Publisher: DC Comics
- Schedule: Monthly
- Format: Limited series
- Genre: Superhero
- Publication date: May – November 2010
- No. of issues: 6
- Main character: Bruce Wayne/Batman

Creative team
- Written by: Grant Morrison
- Penciller(s): Chris Sprouse; Frazer Irving; Yanick Paquette; Georges Jeanty; Ryan Sook; Lee Garbett
- Inker: Karl Story
- Letterer: Jared K. Fletcher
- Colorist: Guy Major
- Editor(s): Mike Marts; Janelle Siegel

Collected editions
- Deluxe edition: ISBN 1-4012-2968-9
- Paperback: ISBN 1401233821

Batman: The Return of Bruce Wayne is a 6-issue American comic book limited series published by the publishing company DC Comics beginning in May to November 2010, written by Grant Morrison and featuring a team of rotating artists starting with Chris Sprouse and Frazer Irving.

The series picks up from Final Crisis #6 but also from Batman #702 (Time and the Batman/RIP The Missing Chapter). The series detailed the journey Bruce Wayne takes through the timestream of the DC Universe after being deposited in the distant past by Darkseid in Final Crisis. Wayne has to overcome amnesia and "history itself" in order to make his way back to present-day Gotham City and retake his rightful place as Batman. The series ran for six issues, each covering a different time period. The time periods are prehistory, the witch hunts, pirates at sea, the Wild West, 20th-century Gotham just a few months after Thomas and Martha Wayne were murdered, and the present day, and usually depict the Batcave or Wayne Manor. Bruce Wayne also visits "the end of time".

== Publication history ==
In an interview announcing the series in USA Today, writer Grant Morrison describes The Return of Bruce Wayne as "...the latest chapter in the long-running, 'definitive' Batman epic I've been trying to pull off since 2005". Branching out of Batman and Son, The Black Glove, and Batman R.I.P., as well as Final Crisis, with connections to Batman and Robin, Morrison purports that the return of Bruce Wayne to Gotham City and the DC Universe will "[have] a mystery and an apocalyptic countdown going on, there are some major twists and reveals, and it sets up big changes to the Batman universe status quo". Morrison also said that the title is mostly related to the Dark Knight for the majority of 2010: "I'm doing at least another year of stories with Dick Grayson and Damian Wayne in the Batman and Robin book before that book starts to dovetail with Return and we rush headlong and screaming into the next big, earth-shattering, game-changing twist in the life of Batman".

Morrison described the vastly different time periods in each issue: "The first episode is set in the Late-Paleolithic Era, the second is in Pilgrim-era Gotham Village, and we also get to see Gotham in Western or noir style. Each of the stories is a twist on a different 'pulp hero' genre — so there's the caveman story, the witchhunter/Puritan adventurer thing, the pirate Batman, the cowboy, the P.I. — as a nod toward those mad old 1950s comics with Caveman Batman and Viking Batman adventures. It's Bruce Wayne's ultimate challenge — Batman vs. history itself!"

As far as his artistic collaborators on the limited series, Morrison explained "...each issue is drawn by a different artist, so that side of it has barely got underway. I know Chris Sprouse is penciling the first one, so I'm fairly confident it'll be the best comic set in the Late Paleolithic Era that you'll have seen for a very long time. I'm a huge fan of Chris' work, so I'm keen to see what he's done. I think Frazer Irving might do the second one, cementing his reputation as the comic world's most prominent Puritan Goth Adventure artist". Irving's involvement in the second issue was confirmed by Batman title solicitations released through DC's blog, "The Source". Yanick Paquette did the art on the third version featuring pirates: "I was with my family at Disney when they asked me to do it. So I spent an extra ride in Pirates of the Caribbean, because I knew I was going to do a Batman pirate".

The writer-artist team of Dan Jurgens and Norm Rapmund released a companion series titled Time Masters: Vanishing Point that stars Rip Hunter, Booster Gold, Superman, and Hal Jordan. The series follows the heroes' journey to find Batman who was lost in time following Final Crisis.

Artist Cameron Stewart didn't handle the art duties on the fourth issue and was replaced by artist Georges Jeanty.

The final issue was released in November 2010, with Ryan Sook sharing art duties with Pere Perez on his issue.

== Plot ==
Bruce Wayne stranded in the Paleolithic Era on the cover of Batman: The Return of Bruce Wayne #1. Art by Andy Kubert.

After being blasted by Darkseid's Omega Beams, an amnesiac Bruce Wayne is cast back in time to the dawn of history. Nearly killed by a tribe of Neanderthals led by the immortal caveman who will become Vandal Savage, Bruce is rescued by a younger human, who returns his utility belt to him. Operating more on instinct than actual knowledge, Bruce dons the pelt of a giant bat and uses the tools in his belt against the cavemen, but is eventually forced to flee by jumping over a waterfall. When he recovers at the bottom, he finds he has jumped further forward in time, arriving in Puritan times.

His first act in this new era is to save a woman named Annie from a monstrous, tentacled creature, after which he tries to build a life for himself in the small colony of Gotham. Calling himself "Mordecai", he joins the ranks of the local witch-hunters alongside his own ancestor Nathaniel Wayne, and uses his forensic skills to solve crimes that might otherwise be blamed on witchcraft. When Annie is revealed to be a witch and claims responsibility for summoning the monster, Bruce is unable to stop her being hanged by Nathaniel. Unaware that the man she promised to love "Until the end of time" is a Wayne himself, Annie curses the Wayne family before she dies. Bruce again finds himself catapulted forward in time.

Bruce appears in the 18th century, where he is confronted by legendary pirate Blackbeard. Blackbeard believes Bruce is the fabled Black Pirate, and demands he lead him to one of the most famous treasures he is known to have stolen—that of the Miagani, a primitive tribe of "Bat-People" descended from the cavemen that Bruce encountered, who immortalized his prehistoric exploits as the god "Barbatos". Blackbeard's other captive, a boy named Jack Loggins, confides in Bruce that he is the grandson of the Black Pirate. Jack then helps Bruce stage a deception that disposes of Blackbeard and all but one of his crew. Afterward, the Miagani guide Bruce to the deepest part of their caves, where he finds his own cape and cowl, left hanging there after his arrival in prehistory. The cape stirs Bruce's memories, and before they fade once more, he instructs Jack to write an account of these events, and place it in a box marked with a bat symbol to be entrusted to the Wayne family. At dawn, Bruce disappears into the timestream once more, moving forward to the late 19th century, and the Wild West.

In this new time period, Bruce fashions an identity for himself as a masked "gunfighter" (though he still has a "no killing" and a "no guns" policy), targeting the operations of Vandal Savage. Savage hires bounty hunter Jonah Hex to deal with Bruce, while he conspires with another of Bruce's ancestors, cultist Thomas Wayne, to steal the box from the Wayne family. Bruce rescues the current holder of the box from the villains, who recognizes him as the box's true owner; after recovering Jack Valor's journal from within, he is shot by Jonah Hex and falls off a dock into the waters of what will one day be Gotham Bay. Following this encounter, the newly founded Wayne family (Bruce's ancestors) build Wayne Manor on a nearby cliffside, and hide the box in the caves below it: the same caves the Miagani used to occupy, which will one day become the Batcave.

Bruce emerges in the 20th century (the exact time is intentionally vague; the clothes and cars suggest the 1930s, but Bruce is told that "retro is big this year") and is taken to the hospital to recover from the gunshot wound, where he meets a woman named Marsha. It transpires that Bruce has arrived in Gotham not long after the deaths of his own parents, and that Marsha was a friend of his mother's who believed his father, Thomas Wayne, had her murdered and faked his own death. She hires Bruce to investigate her theories, but when the suspicious Bruce tracks her to a graveyard, it is revealed that she is a member of the devil-worshipping Black Glove organization, who intend to sacrifice him to Barbatos (unaware that he is responsible for the myth itself) to gain immortality. The ritual involves a time machine created by Professor Carter Nichols, but Bruce disrupts the proceedings by stealing the machine and escaping through time once more.

Bruce materializes at Vanishing Point, the vast archive of all history that exists at the end of time, moments before the death of the universe. Here, Bruce's memories return, and the entire truth comes out: Darkseid never intended to kill him with the Omega Sanction, but instead relied on him to survive, building up destructive "Omega Energy" within his body every time he jumped through history, which would eventually destroy reality upon his return to the 21st century. To prompt these jumps, Darkseid sent a servant, a hyper-dimensional monster known as the Hyper-Adapter, to follow Bruce through time, which has followed him to Vanishing Point.

While all of this has been going on, Bruce's allies in the Justice League of America have realized that he is still alive, and have been searching for him. Superman, Rip Hunter, Hal Jordan and Booster Gold have been traveling through time (events chronicled in the companion miniseries, Time Masters: Vanishing Point), constantly one step behind Bruce, and now arrive at Vanishing Point just as the final step of Bruce's plan goes into motion. Merging with the robotic Architects that maintain Vanishing Point, he has had his memory wiped once more and allows the Hyper Adapter to possess his body, so that he can bring it back to the present day 21st century using the Time Sphere that his allies arrive in. Per Bruce's plan, the combined might of the Justice League defeats the creature, rips it from his body and hurls it back into the Time Sphere, catapulting it backward through time, defeated. The threat of the Omega Energy remains, however, and so the Justice League medically stop Bruce's heart, inducing death and allowing the energy to dissipate. Before his heart is restarted, the comatose Bruce experiences one final vision of Darkseid and Metron, the former inviting him to embrace Anti-Life, and the latter urging him to dispel Darkseid by facing "the first truth of Batman". Bruce recalls the night he first conceived of the identity of Batman, as seen in Batman: Year One, when Alfred Pennyworth saved his life by suturing fatal wounds, and speaks the truth: as much as he has attempted to claim it all during his crimefighting career, the Batman has never been alone. Bruce awakens from the coma, purged of the radiation, and dons his cape and cowl once again, commenting that Gotham's disease has spread beyond its borders and that once again, Batman is needed.

=== Epilogue ===
The story is followed by the events in Bruce Wayne: The Road Home, and then continues directly into issue #16 of Batman and Robin, in which Batman unites with Dick Grayson and Damian Wayne to stop Simon Hurt, who is revealed to be possessed by the Hyper-Adapter after it was sent back in time. Bruce accepts the current situations after the villains' defeat. The plotline then carries on into Batman Incorporated, where Bruce's realization that he is not alone inspires him to expand his crimefighting operation and train new Batmen in countries all around the world.

== Collected editions ==
The series has been collected into an individual volume:

- Batman: The Return of Bruce Wayne (collects Batman: The Return of Bruce Wayne #1–6, 232 pages, deluxe edition hardcover, February 2011, ISBN 1-4012-2968-9; paperback, January 2012, ISBN 1-4012-3382-1)
- Batman by Grant Morrison Omnibus: Volume 2 (hardcover, May 2019 ISBN 978-1-4012-8883-9)

== In other media ==
Several references in "The Return of Bruce Wayne" are featured in the Batman: The Brave and the Bold episode "Time Out for Vengeance!".
