= Klaus (comics) =

2015–19 series by Grant Morrison and Dan Mora

Publication information
- Publisher: Boom! Studios
- Format: Limited series
- Publication date: 2015 – 2019
- No. of issues: 7 + 4 one-shots

Creative team
- Created by: Grant Morrison
- Written by: Grant Morrison
- Artist(s): Dan Mora
- Letterer(s): Ed Dukeshire
- Editor(s): Eric Harburn; Matt Gagnon

Collected editions
- Klaus: ISBN 978-1608869039

Klaus is a superhero created by writer Grant Morrison and artist Dan Mora. Debuting originally in a seven-issue comic book mini-series published in 2015 and 2016 by Boom! Studios, the character has gone on to star in a number of other stories since. The original miniseries is styled as a sprawling superhero origin story, akin to Batman: Year One, re-imagining Santa Claus as a wild shaman of the winter in the 16th century. Drawing on folklore, westerns, and epic fantasy, Morrison and Mora intended to craft a brand-new sexy Santa for the modern age. The origin chronicles Klaus, a wild man of the winter and the forests on his mission with his pet white wolf Lilli, to restore joy to the sacred holiday of Yuletide. Set in the totalitarian town of Grimsvig, wherein joy is forbidden and Yuletide is outlawed, the series casts Santa Claus as a V for Vendetta and Robin Hood-esque figure, fighting its fascistic Lord Magnus, and the greater demonic force behind him.

Following the publication of the mini-series, Morrison and Mora have subsequently returned every December, around Christmas season, with a brand new over-sized one-shot, modeled after Doctor Who Christmas Specials. Four one-shots have been published to date: Klaus and The Witch of Winter in December 2016, Klaus and The Crisis in Xmasville in December 2017, Klaus and The Crying Snowman in December 2018, and Klaus and The Life and Times of Joe Christmas in December 2019.

Klaus is an immortal mystical barbarian of joy, gifts, and runes, operating a cosmic sleigh to sail the space-ways. A member of the legendary League Of Santas, Klaus was a participant of the mythic Lunar Civil War between The Kobolts and The Moondogs.

== Concept and creation ==
Klaus began as an idea during the late 2000s, while Morrison was working on All-Star Superman and Batman, while also working as a screenwriter in Hollywood.

== Plot ==
=== Part One ===
In medieval times, an independent trapper named Klaus enters the walled town of Grimsvig to trade furs and hides, and is distressed to find it much changed since the last time he was there. The town is ruled by the tyrannical Lord Magnus, who has conscripted nearly all of the town's men to labor in the nearby coal mine, and has instructed his guardsmen to systematically deprive the townspeople of joy, including canceling the annual Yuletide celebration and confiscating any toys or musical instruments to give to his spoiled young son, Jonas. Magnus himself rarely leaves his castle, shut in with his unhappy wife, Dagmar, and Jonas.

Declaring that they do not trust strangers, the guardsmen confiscate Klaus's wares. At first he does not protest, but is outraged when one of the guardsmen strikes a nearby child, and is badly beaten when he tries to stop it. Marched outside the walls to be executed, he is saved by his pet white wolf, Lilli. Making camp in the forest, he falls asleep and is visited by the spirits of the forest. When he wakes up, he is stunned to see he has carved a large bag of wooden toys in his sleep.

=== Part Two ===
Despite the walls and sealed gates, Klaus slips into Grimsvig at night and distributes the toys among the children of the poorest families, and defacing a portrait of Magnus. Seeing the children playing in the streets, an outraged Magnus has his guards confiscate the toys, claiming that Jonas is dangerously ill and needs them more than the other children. When he demands to know who the mysterious intruder is, one child responds, "it was the Julernisse... the Yuletime Spirit."

Jonas is furious when the confiscated toys fail to give him any joy, and smashes them in a rage. His mother, Dagmar, notes one's resemblance to a carved bird from her childhood, which she has kept hidden, and realizes who the mysterious man is.

When night falls again, Klaus tries to reach the gates, knocking out several guards (and building one into a snowman as a joke), before he is cornered by a pack of hunting dogs.

=== Part Three ===
The dogs are driven off by Lilli, allowing Klaus to escape the town. The guardsmen begin to whisper that the intruder is a ghost or a shape-shifter, while the children begin writing wishes on pieces of paper. Magnus orders his men to guard the doors of every house, so the children burn these wishes in their fireplaces, hoping they will reach "The Santa" through the chimneys.

Magnus takes a grimoire from his library and enters the deepest part of the coal mine, alone, saying he has followed "the voice"'s instructions and soon it will be free.

=== Part Four ===
In flashback, Klaus's story is told: as an infant, he was discovered in the forest, clutched in the arms of his mother, who had frozen to death, but miraculously alive himself. He was adopted by Grimsvig's guard commander, Karl, who named him "Klaus", "Victory of the People." As a boy, he befriended the lord's daughter, Dagmar, giving her a wooden toy bird to replace her deceased pet. They grew up together as best friends, while the young Magnus looked on jealously.

Later, while the young Klaus was a captain of the town guard, Magnus poisoned the lord and put the blame on him, driving him outside the walls to die, but he was saved by Lilli, whose life he had spared while she was still a cub.

In the present, Klaus enters Dagmar's window and confronts her, asking her how she could have thought him guilty of poisoning her father, or how she could have chosen Magnus over him. She has no answer, but he gives her a single toy for Jonas. At first, Jonas wants to smash it, but she sits down and encourages him to tell a story with it, and soon the two of them are playing happily, before Magnus interrupts them. He has a plan to trap "the Santa", using Jonas to write a wish letter.

=== Part Five ===
Jonas admits to Dagmar that Magnus frightened him into writing the letter by showing him the grimoire from the library. Before she can find it for herself, Magnus walks in on her, half-crazed, believing he is surrounded by enemies, in spite of everything he has done to make himself powerful and thus make life better for her and Jonas.

Jonas's letter lures Klaus into a trap laid by Magnus's men, and he is barely able to escape the walls, wounded by a poisoned arrow.

=== Part Six ===
A young boy from the town, with Lilli's help, drags Klaus to his cabin in the woods, where he treats his poisoned wound, but Magnus and his guards follow them there, burning down the cabin and leaving Klaus staked to the surface of a frozen lake, expecting him to die of exposure.

In preparation for a visit from the King, Magnus has the children of the town rounded up and herded into a room in the castle, where they are offered sweets to stuff themselves with. On the same night, a coal miner finally cracks the cell, releasing a huge demon. The demon enters the main hall of the castle, demanding its promised "feast" - the captive children.

Outside Grimsvig, Klaus is visited again by the forest spirits and "changed," imbued with new strength and told to "make [things] better."

=== Part Seven ===
The boy who helped Klaus earlier leads the other captive children out of their cell and through the castle. In the main hall, Magnus's joy at the demon's arrival turns to horror when it attacks Jonas. He opens the grimoire to find the spell to command the demon, only for the demon to laugh and tell him that it used him to gain its freedom, and he has no power over it. Dagmar distracts the demon with an arrow and tells Jonas to run. Jonas meets the other fleeing children before they are all cornered by the Krampus. Before it can devour any of them, Klaus appears on a flying sleigh pulled by eight white wolves, Lilli leading, and wielding a great sword.

Klaus subdues the demon, but is stabbed from behind by Magnus, who demands that Krampus fulfill its half of their bargain: giving him the kingship, and the love of his family and the people. Dagmar, finally admitting to herself that Magnus murdered her father, tells him that all the evil and misery in Grimsvig is his doing alone, and walks away from him with Jonas. Unhinged, Magnus screams at the demon to give him what he deserves - which it does by breathing fire and incinerating him.

The demon seizes Jonas and converts Klaus's sleigh into a dark chariot pulled by hellhounds, and flies into the sky, declaring that "all bad children belong to me!"

Klaus arises, telling Dagmar that the forest spirits have made him immortal. He leaps to a rooftop and jumps onto the chariot, declaring that "there are no bad children!" As the chariot flies into the upper atmosphere, the demon tries to burn Klaus, but its fiery breath doesn't ignite in the thin air, and with his trademark "Ho Ho Ho", Klaus beheads it. The demon's body plummets back to earth, and Klaus returns, in his now-restored sleigh, with Jonas. Dagmar promises the King that, with Klaus as her advisor, she will act as regent of the town, and undo her husband's wickedness.

The Yuletide festival is held every year from then on, and the town recovers its joy, even Jonas, who abandons his old selfishness and learns to play with other children.

As the years pass, Dagmar ages, but Klaus remains the same. After her funeral, Jonas, now middle-aged and the new lord of the town, sees Klaus preparing to depart in his sleigh to bring joy to the rest of the world, but promising to return once every year, when things are at their darkest.

== Collected editions ==
Title	Material collected	Publication date	ISBN
Klaus: How Santa Claus Began	Klaus #1- #7	HC: 22 Nov. 2016 PB: 19 Sept. 2019	HC: 978-1608869039 PB: 978-1684153930
Klaus: The New Adventures of Santa Claus: Volume 2	Klaus and The Witch of Winter Klaus and The Crisis in Xmasville	HC: 1 Nov. 2018 PB: 18 Feb. 2021	HC: 978-1684152391 PB: 978-1684156665
Klaus: The Life & Times of Santa Claus: Volume 3	Klaus and The Crying Snowman Klaus and The Life and Times Of Joe Christmas	HC: 4 Feb. 2021	HC: 978-1684156429
