= Batman and Son =

2006 DC comic book story arc

- Cover of the collection of the story arc, art by Andy Kubert.
- Publisher: DC Comics
- Publication date: September – December 2006
- Genre: Superhero
- Title(s): Batman #655–658
- Main characters: Batman; Damian Wayne; Robin; Talia al Ghul; League of Assassins; Joker

Creative team
- Writer: Grant Morrison
- Artist: Andy Kubert
- Editor: Peter Tomasi
- Batman and Son hardcover: ISBN 1-4012-1240-9

"Batman and Son" is a 2006 comic book story arc featuring the DC Comics character Batman. Written by Grant Morrison and drawn by Andy Kubert, the story was published in four parts in the comic book Batman starting in #655 and ending in #658. The story was the beginning of Morrison's run in the Batman comic as well as their long-term take on the character of Batman through multiple titles over the next seven years. The arc introduced Batman's son, Damian Wayne, bringing him into the mainstream continuity of the DC Universe.

Morrison was hired by DC editors to give their take on Batman after having recently given their definitive take on the character of Superman in All-Star Superman. In writing the arc, they took ideas from past Batman stories, especially the 1987 story Batman: Son of the Demon. Morrison brought back the idea of a son, Damian, being born from a love affair between Batman and Talia al Ghul, the daughter of his nemesis, Ra's al Ghul. The boy had been trained from birth by the League of Assassins and was sent by Talia to live with Batman in a plot to disrupt his crime-fighting and distract him. It also includes the use of sometime Batman adversary, Dr. Kirk Langstrom, and the serum he uses to become the creature Man-Bat.

The arc served as the beginning of Morrison's Batman run and was followed by a prose story about the Joker in Batman #663 and then the fan-named story arc The Three Ghosts of Batman (Batman #664–666). These two arcs and the Joker story were ultimately collected together in trade paperback form since many elements introduced in the first arc were used and expanded upon in the second arc. The story had a lasting impact on the DC Universe, introducing the character of Damian who would go on to co-star in two on-going monthly series for DC and appear in other comic books frequently.

== Background ==
The character of Batman was created by writer Bill Finger and artist Bob Kane. He was introduced in the anthology comic book series Detective Comics #27 in May 1939 published by National Allied Publications (later renamed DC Comics), though at the time was referred to as "The Bat-Man". The character was quickly deemed a success, and followed Superman's lead with the debut of a second on-going self-named title. Batman #1 premiered in spring 1940. The two titles quickly added new characters to the Batman mythos, including the Detective Comics #38 debut of a sidekick for Batman, Robin. Super-villains and other nemeses for the duo were created as well, with Talia al Ghul introduced in Detective Comics #411, and her father, Ra's al Ghul in Batman #232.

The cast of characters in Batman expanded over the years as characters evolved and left for their own comic books. The original Robin left to become his own character, Nightwing, in 1984, and new characters took over the secret identity of Robin throughout the years. In 2005, the character of Tim Drake was Robin. In that year, the miniseries Infinite Crisis was released. The series was a crossover event of all of the characters of the DC Universe, and had universe-changing consequences. At the end of the series, Batman decides that he needs to focus on keeping his family safe and close, so leaves Gotham City with Nightwing, Robin, and his butler Alfred Pennyworth for a year. After his return, he adopts Tim Drake, formally making him his son in the storyline Batman: Face the Face.

Batman also had many interactions with the al Ghul family through the years. Early in their interactions it was established that Talia would be a love interest for Batman even against her father's wishes. Ra's eventually decides that Batman is the perfect mate for his daughter, and after a test where Batman saves her from apparent kidnappers, he considers the two married despite Batman's objections. This idea was later explored in 1987's Batman: Son of the Demon, where the two have a child, Damian. Though the story was never in continuity, themes and plot points from it would be used in other stories. In the 2003 story, Batman: Death and the Maidens, Ra's is apparently killed and Talia psychologically tortured until she disavows her love of Batman. After the story, Talia was portrayed more as Batman's enemy than his lover.

== Production ==
Senior editor at DC Comics, Peter Tomasi, was the editor of the Batman books in 2006. He was supposed to be the editor of Grant Morrison's Superman story, All-Star Superman, but when that changed and he was exclusively on Batman, he decided to work with Morrison. Tomasi spoke with DC's executive editor, Dan Didio and convinced him to hire Morrison for the main Batman book. Morrison had previously worked with the character of Batman in the graphic novel Arkham Asylum: A Serious House on Serious Earth, where they explored the psyches of Batman and a number of his enemies, and in the storyline, Batman: Gothic, where they created a story about the past of Gotham City and Batman himself, coupled with their modern re-defining of Batman in their lengthy JLA run. Morrison would use these previous stories to conceive their new Batman arc which would eventually lead into, as well as become Batman R.I.P.. Morrison told Didio what they were working towards, and when Didio agreed to their ideas, Morrison used Batman and Son to start to work towards this story.

After Morrison was chosen as writer, an artist was needed. It was decided that they would be paired with Andy Kubert, who had started his career at DC Comics and had just signed a three-year exclusive contract with the company.

== Plot ==
Cover from Batman #658, the concluding issue of Batman and Son, art by Andy Kubert.

The story begins in medias res as the Joker has managed to poison Commissioner Gordon and is crouched over what appears to be a bloody and beaten Batman. As Joker gloats over his "victory", the beaten Batman pulls out a handgun and manages to shoot the Joker in the face. At that moment, the real Batman appears and captures the Joker, throwing him into a dumpster. When he later visits a recovering Gordon in the hospital, he learns that in his short time back in Gotham, he has managed to rid the city of supercrime.

In the Batcave, Alfred tells Batman that he has been so focused on his war on crime that he has started to lose touch with his Bruce Wayne identity. Robin states that he believes a vacation away from Gotham could be beneficial, so Batman decides to attend a charity event at the London Pop Art museum where he can spend time rejuvenating the playboy Bruce Wayne identity. Although he is troubled by a quick meeting by Dr. Kirk Langstrom, the former Man-Bat, he attends the party talking with a myriad of women. One woman that intrigues him is millionaire Jezebel Jet, former supermodel and newly named leader of a small African country. They chat for a while before she claims that she does not want to be one of Bruce Wayne's conquests.

Meanwhile, Langstrom is confronted by Talia al Ghul, who threatens that if he does not give his Man-Bat serum to the League of Assassins she will poison his wife Francine, rendering her blind and crippled. While Bruce is at the party, Kirk and Francine are thrown out the back of a van in front of Alfred. He asks them what is wrong, and Kirk tells him that Talia now has the Man-Bat serum. Inside, the party is interrupted as an army of ninja Man-Bats attacks. Bruce changes to his Batman costume and faces down the army in an effort to save the attendants of the gala until he is rendered unconscious. When he awakens, he finds himself in front of Talia, who explains to him that he is the father of her son Damian.

Batman and Damian return to Gotham City where the Dark Knight introduces his son to the Batcave, Alfred, and his adopted son, Tim. Damian is immediately hostile towards Tim, as he believes he alone is truly Batman's son and rightful heir. His petulant attitude gets him locked up in one of Wayne Manor's many rooms, but he easily escapes. Later, Tim is searching for Alfred (who has been locked in a room by Damian) in the Batcave when he comes across Damian, armed with a sword that Batman had taken from him. Suspicious, Tim tries to befriend Damian when the younger child reveals that he went out and beheaded a criminal known as the Spook, and placed a grenade in his mouth. Shocked, Tim yells at Damian that killing is not their way. Damian responds by tossing the head in the air, which explodes when it hits the ground. The two spar until Tim helps Damian off the snapping Tyrannosaurus rex jaws. Damian then punches out Tim and takes Jason Todd's displayed Robin costume with him. Later, the Bat-Signal is lit and Batman finds Damian wearing the costume. Batman asks how he got out of the Batcave without being seen and then asks what he has done with Tim.

Back at the cave, Batman cares for Tim and reluctantly agrees to take Damian with him to stop Talia and save the British Prime Minister's wife, when Damian reveals he has worked out that Talia wishes to trade her hostage for control over Gibraltar. Batman wants to keep Damian under his control, as he realized that Talia sent him with Batman to cause havoc in his life. The two soon reach Gibraltar where they confront Talia. Damian appeals to both of them that he wants them all to be a family, but Britain's Royal Navy bomb the ship on where they are fighting. Batman escapes, while Talia and Damian vanish in an explosion.

== Aftermath ==
After the four-issue interlude Batman: Grotesk, Morrison returned with the prose story "The Clown at Midnight" in Batman #663. The story was acclaimed and called one of the definitive Joker stories. Den of Geek called it one of 10 essential Joker stories, and it was revealed that Heath Ledger read the story to help him become the character for the film, The Dark Knight. Many of the plot points in the story were used later in Morrison's run during the story arc Batman R.I.P. when the Joker would return.

Morrison's next three issues have been called by the title of the first one, in Batman #664, The Three Ghosts of Batman. The ghosts referred to in the title were three individuals who wear variants of Batman's costume and take his crime fighting to the extreme. The first was the fake Batman who shot the Joker in Morrison's first issue. Later in that issue, he had been revealed to be an ex-cop who had become a vigilante. The second ghost showed up in #664 when a pimp that had been supplying an ex-policeman who lived on an abandoned facility with prostitutes told Batman that the women turned up dead. Batman tracked him down and was severely beaten by the man, who was dressed in a mixture of Batman's and Bane's costumes. Batman suspected the imposter had used Hugo Strange's monster serum and daily Venom shots to gain his size and strength. Batman is able to stop this ghost with Robin's help. He tells Alfred of a vision he had of three ghost Batmen who had taken his crime-fighting to the extreme limits. He had written of these visions in The Black Casebook and knew after these encounters that he may have to revisit the strange cases in the book. The third Batman was introduced in a future story in Batman #666. The story is presented as a possible future where Damian has taken over the job as Batman. Police Commissioner Barbara Gordon blames him for the death of Dick Grayson and wants him arrested while Damian is pursuing the third ghost, who claims to be the Antichrist. Damian eventually kills the man by snapping his neck, after battling him at the Hotel Bethlehem.

In Morrison's next story arc, Batman takes Robin with him to the Island of Mister Mayhew where he learns that the organization Black Glove is out to kill him. After a two-issue interlude in the Batman title crossover The Resurrection of Ra's al Ghul, the true history of the three ghosts is revealed. The third ghost showed up at police headquarters looking for Commissioner Vane and killed a number of officers. Batman, who had started a love affair with Jezebel Jet as Bruce Wayne, was attacked by the ghost on the roof of the headquarters. His heart stopped and he had visions of old cases of his which had many unexplained phenomena as well as a vision of Joe Chill, the thief who had murdered his parents when he was a child. When he awoke from the visions, he was a captive of the ghost. As the man talked to him, Batman remembered from where the ghosts had come. What Batman thought was a hallucination turned out to be a forgotten memory in which three men were chosen from the police force to train with Batman to replace him should anything ever happen to him. During the test, Batman had himself isolated so that Simon Hurt could study what drives him. When the three replacement Batmen came in to challenge him, Batman took them down easily. Hurt decided that the three Batmen needed to be driven by rage and sorrow to become like Batman. The first, Josef Muller, was an ace marksman as a cop, but had both hands broken by Batman in their fight causing him to have to retire. Hurt killed the family of the third man, whose name was Lane, and began adding Venom and monster serum to the diet of the second man, Branca, until he was driven to kill his own family in rage. Hurt put hypnotic suggestions into Batman's head to help him forget the whole experience and dismiss it as a nightmare. The three replacement cops were hidden away to await the day they would return. Batman is eventually able to escape, but Lane warns him that Hurt is after him and his luck would soon be gone.

Lane was later revealed to be Michael Lane. He became the new Azrael, the agent of the Order of Purity, a splinter group of the Order of St. Dumas, in Azrael: Death's Dark Knight #1. In keeping with his imitation of Batman, he wears the "Suit of Sorrows" given to Bruce Wayne by Talia al Ghul during Batman: The Resurrection of Ra's al Ghul. Lane accepts the Order's offer to become Azrael as a way of atoning for his perceived role in the demise of Batman. As Azrael, his mission is to spread "God's justice" through Gotham City in the chaos resulting from the absence of Bruce Wayne as Batman.

== Collected editions ==
The story has been collected into a single volume in both hardcover and softcover formats. This volume includes the "Three Ghosts of Batman" arc as well as the prose Joker story. It covers issues 655-658 and 663-666 of Batman.

- Batman and Son (200 pages, hardcover, August 2007, ISBN 1-4012-1240-9, softcover, July 2008, ISBN 1-4012-1241-7)
- Batman and Son - an expanded edition was released in 2014, collecting Batman issues #655-658, 663-669 and 672-675 (384 pages, softcover, February 2014, ISBN 1-4012-4402-5)
- Absolute Batman and Son - an oversized edition was released in 2024, collecting Batman issues #655-658, 663-669 and 672-675, and Batman Incorporated volume 2 issue #5, and featuring "a new cover, an introduction from Andy Kubert, and other extras" (456 pages, hardcover with slipcase, July 2024, ISBN 1-77952-736-5)
- Batman & Son: DC Compact Comics Edition (200 pages, softcover, August 2026)

== In other media ==
The DC Universe Animated Original Movies' film Son of Batman was inspired by the story arc. The film differs from the comic in many points, making Deathstroke the main antagonist and severely downplaying Talia's and Damian's negative traits. Much of Talia's role in the story arc is adapted to Deathstroke in the film.

== Impact and legacy ==
Morrison's first run in Batman has had generally positive reviews, but the first arc has been called weaker than the second. The issues of Batman and Son were given a B+ grade by Batman-On-Film saying that though the first two issues were well paced and interesting, it suffered from too fast an ending. Tor.com, however, claimed the story began an epic ultimate definition of Batman. In IGN's review of the three issues of The Three Ghosts of Batman arc, they called #672 great, #673 awesome, and #674 awesome. The storyline was not universally praised, with it being called inconsistent, frustrating, and disjointed.

The story had a lasting impact on Batman stories as well as the DC Universe as a whole with the introduction of the character of Damian Wayne and the set-up of plot elements in Morrison's stories. Damian would eventually become the fifth Robin and co-star in Morrison's on-going Batman and Robin title since. He has also appeared in other titles, especially those set around Gotham City. Morrison knew that the character was hated from the start, but was glad that people warmed to the character and he appeared in other books. The plot points introduced in the story would be continued throughout Morrison's run on Batman and their continuation in the other Batman titles of which Morrison is the head writer.
