= Batman and Robin (comic book) =

American comic book ongoing series

- Variant incentive cover for Batman and Robin #1 (summer 2009), art by J. G. Jones.

Publication information
- Publisher: DC Comics
- Schedule: Monthly
- Format: Ongoing series
- Genre: Superhero
- Publication date: August 2009 – August 2011
- No. of issues: 26
- Main character(s): Batman (Dick Grayson); Robin (Damian Wayne)

Creative team
- Created by: Grant Morrison; Frank Quitely
- Written by: Grant Morrison (#1-16); Paul Cornell (#17-19); Peter Tomasi (#20-22); Judd Winick (#23-25); David Hine (#26)
- Artist(s): Frank Quitely (#1-3); Philip Tan (#4-6); Cameron Stewart (#7-9, 16); Andy Clarke (#10-12); Frazer Irving (#13-16); Scott McDaniel (#17-19); Patrick Gleason (#20-22); Guillem March (#23-25)

Collected editions
- Volume 1 HC: ISBN 1-4012-2566-7
- Volume 2 HC: ISBN 1-4012-2833-X

Batman and Robin is an American comic book ongoing series, created by Grant Morrison and featuring Batman and Robin. The debut of the series followed the events of "Batman R.I.P.", Final Crisis, and "Battle for the Cowl" in which the original Batman, Bruce Wayne, apparently died at the hands of DC Comics villain Darkseid and features the winner of the "Battle for the Cowl" as the new Batman. The conclusion of Battle for the Cowl shows Dick Grayson ascending to the role of Batman, while Damian Wayne becomes the new Robin.

Morrison returned to writing the characters after being the ongoing writer on Batman from issues #655–658 and #663–683. While writing for this title, Morrison simultaneously wrote the miniseries The Return of Bruce Wayne and finished their run on the title with issue #16, before moving onto the next phase of their narrative in Batman Incorporated. Paul Cornell and Scott McDaniel created a three-issue arc before the new ongoing creative team, the former Green Lantern Corps duo of writer Peter Tomasi and artist Patrick Gleason, began their run with February 2011's issue #20.

Tomasi and Gleason launched a second volume of the series in conjunction with The New 52, a DC Universe line-wide relaunch in 2011 featuring Bruce Wayne as Batman and Damian Wayne as Robin. That series concluded after 40 issues and a series of other one-shots, as well as an annual. A third volume was launched in 2023 with Bruce and Damian Wayne as the lead characters in conjunction with the Dawn of DC initiative by writer Joshua Williamson and artist Simone Di Meo.

== Style and tone ==
In an interview with IGN before the release of the first issue, Morrison detailed that the tone of the series would be a "reverse" of the normal dynamic between Batman and Robin, with, "a more light-hearted and spontaneous Batman and a scowling, bad ass Robin". Morrison also divulged that this is a continuation of their previous work on the Batman character, although this is a different title than what they wrote previously: "This is the next book in what will be a 5-volume series beginning [with] Batman and Son, but it can be read on its own too. Batman and Robin welcomes new readers!" Morrison also said that even though the series deals with familiar identities, the series features all new villains and situations, but also revealed that some villains were glimpsed in Batman #666.

When asked if the series would deal with the new Batman being unable to fill Bruce Wayne's proverbial shoes, Morrison answered: "When I started out I had that in mind, and I thought we'd finally prove that nobody else could be Batman. But I do believe certain aspects of RIP were about how nobody but this guy could be Batman. I think with this, it's fun to start by seeing what happens when someone else tries. Sometimes it goes wrong, and sometimes it goes really well. Some of the things these guys do are things that Bruce Wayne would never have thought to do".

Morrison has cited the "bizarre, psychedelic feel" of the 1960s Batman TV series and the "bad dreamlike feeling of a Marilyn Manson video in the '90s, or (...) Chris Cunningham's video for 'Windowlicker'", as well as David Lynch, Twin Peaks, and Crank: High Voltage as influences on the series. Morrison also described the series as "psychedelic noir."

Unlike their previous collaborations in JLA Earth-2 and All-Star Superman, the writer asked artist Frank Quitely to choreograph the flow of the action in his own way, rather than through Morrison's normally heavily detailed scripts. Morrison also "asked [Quitely] to re-introduce the much-maligned sound effects to superhero comics, but in a way that integrates them more closely with the art". He also described Batman and Robin as, "a shorter, pacier collaboration so we've tried to keep it looser and more open than All-Star Superman". Morrison also stated that "All Star Superman is quite staged and formal, with repeated wide panels and an emphasis on plot rather than action. [The first arc of Batman and Robin] is very fast moving, with that kinetic hand-held camera feel."

Morrison described their take on Dick Grayson as "this consummate superhero. The guy has been Batman's partner since he was a kid, he's led the Teen Titans, and he's trained with everybody in the DC Universe. So he's a very different kind of Batman. He's a lot easier; He's a lot looser and more relaxed."

Following Quitely's run on the first three issues, Philip Tan became artist for the next three issues, an arc entitled "Revenge of the Red Hood", with Cameron Stewart as the artist for "Blackest Knight", the third arc, followed by Andy Clarke drawing the fourth arc titled "Batman vs. Robin" and Quitely coming back to the book sometime after. Frazer Irving took over for the fifth arc "Batman and Robin Must Die!" starting in issue #13.

In an interview with USA Today, Morrison outlined the future of the titles: "I'm doing at least another year of stories with Dick Grayson and Damian Wayne in the Batman and Robin book before that book starts to dovetail with Return and we rush headlong and screaming into the next big, earth-shattering, game-changing twist in the life of Batman".

Peter Tomasi and Patrick Gleason later took over the title after Grant Morrison, while Morrison went onto a different title. Dick Grayson continued his role as Batman concurrently with Bruce Wayne, and remained as the star of Batman and Robin.

== Continuity with "Batman: R.I.P.", Bruce Wayne ==
With this title being Morrison's primary work in the Batman world for nearly two years, the writer said that this is a direct continuation of their Batman work: "With the collections out, we've got "Batman and Son", we've got The Black Glove, we've got "Batman R.I.P.", and then we've got this one, Batman and Robin, and then, hopefully, there will be a final volume, a fifth volume".

In regards to the fate of Bruce Wayne, Morrison stated that they would be dealing with that in the future: "Bruce is still out there. Final Crisis revealed Bruce is still out there and he's got to make his way back in some way". Morrison also made the case for fans that disapprove of having a Batman that is not Bruce Wayne: "We're not really entertaining the notion that Bruce won't be back at some time. This isn't like Captain America with the Winter Soldier story and Cap's really gone. This is an ongoing story, another chapter in the life of Batman, so I think even people who are fans of Bruce and who think no one else can be Batman will be entertained by this. And be intrigued to see who it is".

Morrison eventually brought Wayne back in a miniseries in which the title promised the character's return, and as promised, dovetailed the conclusion of that series with their final issue of the Batman and Robin title, seeing Bruce Wayne create Batman Incorporated.

== Plot ==
=== Volume 1 (2009 - 2011) ===
The main story of the comic series was made up of a series of three-issue story arcs. The first one, "Batman: Reborn", was penciled by Frank Quitely. The second arc, "Revenge of the Red Hood", was penciled by Philip Tan. The third arc, "Blackest Knight", is penciled by Cameron Stewart on issues #7-9 of Batman and Robin (2010). The fourth arc, "Batman vs. Robin", is penciled by Andy Clarke and contains issues #10-12. The fifth arc, penciled by Frazer Irving, is titled, "Batman and Robin Must Die!", is the start of Batman: The Return of Bruce Wayne and the end of the arc started by Batman: Reborn. After Paul Cornell's run on issues #17-19, the next arc was written by Peter Tomasi and pencilled by Patrick Gleason, and was entitled "Dark Knight, White Knight".

==== "Batman: Reborn" (issues #1-3) ====
The new Batman and Robin take down a villain named Mr. Toad and deliver him to the police. Batman and Robin then set out to the police department after meeting up with Alfred to answer the Bat-Signal. Professor Pyg, a psychotic mutilation enthusiast in the guise of a pig, then tortures one of Toad's men, fixing him with a Dollotron mask. Pyg then expresses interest to doing the same to the man's daughter. Dick and Damian then fight the Circus of Strange; Dick fails Damian, who leaves to beat Pyg alone afterward. Damian then sees the man's daughter, promising to save her and her father, before being knocked out. Eventually Dick and Damian stop the gang, while the girl is saved by the Red Hood in a new uniform.

==== "Revenge of the Red Hood" (issues #4-6) ====
Dick correctly infers that the new Red Hood is Jason Todd. The girl that the Red Hood saved, fixed with an imperfectly placed Dollotron mask, has now assumed the vigilante guise of Scarlet and acts as Red Hood's sidekick. Red Hood and Scarlet tear through the streets of Gotham, killing criminals. Various crime lords of Gotham, fearing the recent escalation in crime fighting by Jason and Scarlet, approach a new villain named the Flamingo to help defeat them. The Flamingo arrives, and shoots Jason twice. The Flamingo begins to overpower Jason, even when Batman and Robin assist, paralyzing Robin in the process. Scarlet manages to cut the Flamingo's face open, allowing Jason to kill him. Batman arrives to see that Damian is paralyzed from the waist down, but will recover due to his mother's influence and ability to replace Damian's damaged organs with harvested ones and Commissioner Gordon arrives and arrests Jason, who asks why Talia had not put Bruce in the Lazarus Pit. Scarlet's Dollotron mask falls off, and she repents her actions, fleeing Gotham for greener pastures. Oberon Sexton receives a call from a man who tells him that their group is everywhere while Dick enters a mysterious tunnel in the heart of the Batcave. Saying the password "zur...en...arrh", it is revealed that Dick, after the conclusion of the Blackest Night storyline, moved the body of Bruce Wayne into the more secure location. Dick thinks about what Jason said to him about the Lazarus Pit.

==== "Blackest Knight" (issues #7-9) ====
Following the "Blackest Night" storyline, Dick takes Jason's suggestion into consideration and decides to check if Bruce's corpse is real. Dick enlists the aid of England's Squire and Knight to help him locate the last existing Lazarus Pit. After saving the Pearly Prince from destroying London, Dick believes that the Pearly King can give him information on the location of the Lazarus Pit. Pearly refuses to, however Knight has already found the pit. After arriving in the Pit they fight King Coal's men, who were already taken down by Knight. They encounter Batwoman, who is alerted that Dick is the new Batman, and she tells them that King Coal's men planned to sacrifice her to a new God of crime that is supposed to rise on that night. Dick remarks that there is no god of evil in the Pit, only the "real" Batman. The body is reanimated and rises from the Pit, but is unable to speak and begins attacking all that he sees. Dick sees that this being's rage is murderous, which conclusively proves that the body could not be Bruce Wayne's.

It is revealed by flashback that the body of "Batman" is a clone of Bruce Wayne created by Darkseid during Final Crisis. Most of the clones were euthanized due to being driven insane, but Darkseid claimed that one dead perfect clone of Batman could be useful to him. The dead clone is, in fact, the body recovered by Superman in the climax of Final Crisis after Darkseid sent the real Batman into the past with his Omega Sanction.

Outside, King Coal sets off explosions that cause the cave to implode around everyone. "Batman" escapes and flies to Gotham City, while Dick and a severely injured Batwoman are separated from Knight and Squire. Injured and paralyzed, Batwoman realizes that Dick is the new Batman and tells him that she is dying, but has a plan. Knight and Squire finally get to them, but Dick claims that Batwoman has died. Meanwhile, in Gotham, Alfred visits the vault in which "Bruce's" body was kept, finding that it was taken by Dick. Extremely worried, he meets a wheelchair-using Damian, returning from his spinal reconstruction. Alfred informs Damian that Dick has taken the body. Damian looks into Dick's files and finds the plan for resurrecting his "father" by use of a Lazarus Pit. At that moment, the door opens and "Batman" throws Alfred into the room, and confronts Damian. Being unsure of who he was seeing, Damian simply asks, "Father...?"

Dick explains that, due to the serious trauma that Batwoman has sustained, they decided they should let her die, then resurrect her in the Lazarus Pit. Batwoman overdoses on the morphine in Dick's medkit and, after being placed in the pit, is revived healthy. The cloned Batman is fended off by Alfred and an injured Damian, who is convinced it is not, in fact, his father. Damian lures the clone onto a patch of gasoline and ignites it, but the clone continues his attack.

Dick takes a plane suborbital, and is able to make it to Gotham in 25 minutes—just in time to catch Damian, who has been cast off the top of Wayne Towers by the cloned Batman. The cloned Batman is decaying, and Batwoman and Dick defeat it. Back in the Batcave, Dick apologizes for taking the mission on his own, stating that he did not want to get anyone's hopes up. He then states that Tim Drake was right, Bruce Wayne must still be alive.

==== "Batman vs. Robin" (issues #10-12) ====
There are strange troubles in Thomas Wayne's funds that Damian deals with. With the newfound knowledge that the corpse that Superman had recovered during the "Final Crisis" storyline, and which was later used in the "Blackest Night" storyline is not the corpse of Bruce Wayne, and that Bruce may truly be alive, Dick Grayson obtains knowledge from the Justice League of America that the "Omega Effect" Darkseid used on Batman may have sent him back through time, and Tim Drake is convinced that Bruce is using clues in the past to help his proteges and Alfred recover him. Talia is upset that Damian wants to stay with Dick and Alfred. Oberon Sexton is chased by hitmen and narrowly manages to escape.

Alfred discovers a new lair in the Batcave, while dismantling booby traps set up by Black Glove, and discovers portraits of Bruce's patrilineage. A "bat" theme is recurring in many of these portraits, causing Damian Wayne to suspect that if his father is truly in the past, one of the ancestors in the portrait may be Bruce himself. The story continues in Batman: The Return of Bruce Wayne.

Later, not knowing what he is doing, Damian attempts to slice Dick's head off. He then runs into a cemetery, only to be grabbed by Oberon Sexton, who is still being chased by hitmen.

Damian is revealed to be controlled by Talia al Ghul, using a device attached to his spine after the Flamingo's attack. Oberon Sexton single-handedly defeats all the assassins. Upon his interrogation of one of the assassins, Damian notes that Oberon Sexton's British accent is fake. After grouping that fact with his incredible battle skills, detective abilities, and stealth, asks if he is Bruce Wayne, the real Batman. Damian's question is ignored, and he is taken over by Deathstroke, who is using Talia's device to attack Dick.

Although he is in under the control of Slade Wilson, Damian manages to warn Dick Grayson that Deathstroke controls him. Dick incapacitates Damian and uses an electrical charge to shock Slade out of Damian's body. Dick and Damian make a trip to Talia's secret fortress. Talia threatens to disown Damian if he does not leave being Robin and come back to her. To back up her threat, she shows Damian a clone that she has made of him. The clone is an exact duplicate - except for the fact that the clone is 10 years younger than Damian. Damian, though hurt, refuses to go along with his mother and leaves with Dick, who was confronting Slade while Damian was with his mother. Back in the cave, Dick, Damian, and Alfred find a bat-totem that seems to confirm that Bruce is stuck in the past. With this information, Dick goes to confront Oberon Sexton, who is under police protection. Sexton then reveals himself to really be the Joker.

==== "Batman and Robin Must Die!" (issues #13-15) ====
The next story arc, "Batman and Robin Must Die!" begins with Simon Hurt holding Batman and Robin hostage. As Dick Grayson is beaten down and unmasked by Hurt's men, Hurt taunts him, asking whether Batman believes that a Grayson is superior to a Wayne. As Dick claims that Hurt has already been beaten, Hurt then shoots Dick in the back of the head while Robin watches.

A flashback of the events leading to this begins when Robin arrives at Oberon's apartment, where Dick has apprehended the Joker. As they begin questioning him, the Joker reveals that, since the death of "his Batman", he is no longer the "clown prince" that he once was and took on the identity of Oberon to gain the new Batman's trust. The Joker warns Batman that everyone will die unless Dick Grayson's Batman is as good as the last one.

Batman brings Gordon to the Batcave, where Batman theorizes that Pyg's virus might have been carried throughout a common cold as a Trojan virus. As Gordon shows signs of being infected, they receive an alert that the Joker has asked to see Robin alone. Batman and Gordon then rush to return to GCPD headquarters. Meanwhile, Robin (using a crowbar) is attempting to torture information out of the Joker. As Dick and Gordon race to stop Damian from killing the Joker, they are shot down mid-air by the Black Glove and Dick is knocked unconscious, leaving Gordon surrounded by an army of Dollotrons. At the same time, Professor Pyg is freed from Arkham by El Penitente's men.

The Joker then manages to escape GCPD headquarters by scratching Damian with Joker venom. Meanwhile, Batman and Commissioner Gordon are separated by the swarm of Dollotrons, who deliver Gordon to Professor Pyg and Doctor Hurt. Dick barely escapes when the new Batmobile self-destructs and wakes up in the Bat-Bunker. Dick attempts to contact Damian, but his com-link is answered by the Joker, who reveals his endgame: Batman and Robin, working for the Joker. Throughout the city, Pyg's infection has turned Gotham into a city of drug addicts, who are shown throwing the city into chaos.

Gordon is then showcased by Hurt to a group of crime lords, with Hurt declaring Gotham 'the new Capital of Crime'. Batman and Joker attack the event by incapacitating Pyg's Dollotrons and poisoning the audience with Joker venom, respectively. Dick, however, is taken prisoner by Hurt after an addicted Gordon knocks him out. The Joker (wearing his Oberon Sexton get-up and mask) is then seen preparing another attack on the Black Glove, implying that he intends to use a trussed-up Robin.

After sending Batman out after Hurt, Joker prepares to send Robin. Robin obeys in order to save Batman, whom the Joker claims is in 'the Devil's chopping block'. Meanwhile, Hurt (disguised as Thomas Wayne) returns and takes over Wayne Manor, addressing that he will save the city. Robin, meanwhile, manages to attack Professor Pyg, and frees a now-cured Gordon from the virus. Damian then advises the Commissioner (who guesses that enough rage can counter the virus) to take back the city, refusing Gordon's help. Robin, however, proves no match for Hurt's 99 Fiends gang, and is overpowered and delivered to Hurt, along with Batman.

The story then shifts to the present, with Hurt revealing that the shot to Batman's head is not fatal, but in 12 hours would result in a hematoma that would leave Dick incapacitated for life. In exchange for saving Dick, Hurt makes Robin promise to give up his soul, and assist him in resurrecting Barbatos through the box that Bruce Wayne encounters in Batman: The Return of Bruce Wayne. Before Robin can pledge his soul to Hurt, someone whistles the tune that opens the box, revealing a note with the word "Gotcha". Batman and Robin (who were actually stalling all the time) take down Hurt together. The Dynamic Duo then points Hurt out to someone behind the villain. The shadowed figure is revealed to be none other than Bruce Wayne himself, who simply says, "It's all over".

==== "Black Mass" (issue #16) ====
Serving as the conclusion of "Batman and Robin Must Die!", the issue begins with a flashback to the 18th century depicting Simon Hurt's encounter with Darkseid's hyper-adapter during his cult's attempt to summon the demon Barbatos in a seance. In the present, Hurt sics his 99 Fiends gang on the Dynamic Duo and the recently returned Bruce Wayne. The trio defeats Hurt's thugs in a matter of minutes, and subsequently splits up, with Bruce pursuing Hurt into the Batcave and Dick and Damian leaving to Gotham Square in order to defuse Professor Pyg's bomb. As Bruce sprints down to the Batcave, Hurt reveals that he has Alfred hostage underwater before trapping Bruce in the decommissioned interrogation room. Meanwhile, Dick and Damian confront Pyg and turn his Dollotrons against him. As Dick collapses from his head wound, Damian climbs atop Pyg's float and defuses the bomb with seconds to spare.

Back at the Batcave, Bruce escapes the interrogation chamber with ease and attacks Hurt. Batman reveals that Hurt is neither his father nor Satan, but a delusional maniac driven insane (but granted extended longevity) by an encounter with an extraterrestrial weapon, who was treated by the real Dr. Thomas Wayne in the years before Bruce's birth. Hurt makes his escape by forcing Bruce to choose between capturing him or saving Alfred from drowning. As Bruce dives into the Batcave's waters to retrieve his butler from a flooded cockpit, Hurt flees the manor, only to be poisoned and buried alive by the Joker outside. The Joker is shortly thereafter beaten into submission by Bruce.

The next day, Dick is recovering from his bullet wound while the Gotham quarantine is lifted. That night, Bruce announces to the world that he has been secretly financing Batman for years, and is taking the Bat-Family's fight against crime to the next level; Batman Incorporated.

==== "The Sum of Her Parts" (issues #17-19) ====
Batman and Robin investigate the disappearance the corpse of Una Nemo, one of Bruce Wayne's former girlfriends, who was shot in the head during Wayne's disappearance. After following a trail of clues involving the woman's empty grave, the return of Nemo's fake corpse, and an exploding fingernail serving as a trap, the Dynamic Duo head out to a church, where they find a seemingly brainwashed crowd playing out a fake wedding with a kidnapped technician. Fighting off the crowd, Batman and Robin rescue the technician, only to be trapped in the balcony above the church. Moments later, the technician flings himself down the crowd, removing the disguise to reveal Una Nemo, now calling herself the Absence.

Batman and Robin are shot down from their hiding place by the Absence, who orders her people to restrain the two. She then proceeds to relate her origin story, beginning with her break-up with Bruce Wayne, which hurts her terribly. During a cruise with her friend, Terri, a group of thugs hold up the ship. After seeing Terri shot dead, Una attempts to cut one of the thugs with her wine glass, only to be shot in the head and fall in the water.

Waking near the beach, she manages to return home and discovers she has Dandy Walker syndrome, which has allowed her to survive despite the gaping hole in her head. Disguising herself to attend her own funeral, she finds that none of the mourners cared for her very much, despite her status as a successful and kind businesswoman. The breaking point comes when she sees that Bruce Wayne failed to attend, and Una removes her bandages, her obsession with absence forged.

After telling her story to Batman and Robin, The Absence leaves, setting off an explosion in the church, saying: "Until [Bruce] notices I'm gone...I'll keep reminding him". Batman and Robin manage to escape the conflagration, and regroup in the Bat-Bunker, where Damian muses on his father's habit of pretending to like women as a disguise. After discussing the matter, Alfred decides to call Bruce, who talks with Dick about the matter. Bruce says that he is sorry, and warns Batman about what they both think the Absence will do next.

Meanwhile, Vicki Vale is attempting to write an article in her new apartment when she is confronted by the Absence, wielding a scissor and a bag of body parts belonging to Bruce's old girlfriends. Although the Absence manages to capture Batman and Robin, trapping them into a device that is set to drill holes in the middle of their heads, the drill bits prove to be fake. They escape the trap, but the Absence escapes.

==== "Tree of Blood" (issues #20-22) ====
Batman and Robin deal with the White Knight, a luminous villain whose modus operandi is to force family members of Arkham inmates to commit suicide in order to cut off their bloodlines, thus ending what he believes to be the insanity running through their veins. The White Knight possesses a tree containing totems of famous Arkham inmates (such as Victor Zsasz, the Mad Hatter, and the Man-Bat), with the names of their relations written on each totem. Dick, Damian and Alfred discuss Damian's choice to be Robin. After a showdown with in an illuminated Arkham Asylum, the White Knight's mechanical wings explode, fusing them to his body. It is revealed that Batman and Robin's new rogue is named Lewis Bayard, the son of a murdered Arkham guard. At his own Arkham cell, the White Knight begins a new Tree of Blood from a bonsai tree, hanging Batman and Robin's emblems from the limbs as the light goes out.

==== "The Streets Run Red" (issues #23-25) ====
After a conversation with Bruce Wayne, it is revealed that Jason Todd, the Red Hood, has requested for a transfer from Arkham Asylum. Bruce warns Batman and Robin to keep a close eye on Red Hood; meanwhile, Jason proceeds to cause havoc on the minimal prison he is incarcerated in. After a spree which ends with many people poisoned in the cafeteria, the warden of the prison returns Red Hood to Arkham. Before Batman and Robin can arrive at the scene, the convoy transporting Jason is ambushed, and he is sprung free by a group of mercenaries with features like that of animals.

Introducing themselves as the Menagerie (a group of mercenaries whom Batman and the Red Hood identify as working in South America), the team was assigned to deliver Red Hood to a mysterious woman acting as their financier. Red Hood attempts to fight the Menagerie off but remains on the verge of defeat until Batman and Robin arrive. A sarcastic Jason sighs: "Thank God. It's Batman and Robin". Batman and Robin take out the mercenaries and attempt to recapture Todd, who, during the fight, uses one of the Menagerie as a hostage against both parties. At that moment, the mysterious person who orchestrated Todd's escape tells the Red Hood that she holds his previous sidekick, Scarlet, in a similar predicament.

Todd is then forced to work with Batman and Robin in an attempt to free Scarlet. He sets up a meeting with the woman, pretending to have gone off Batman and Robin's radar. The two crash the meeting, thanks to the Batmobile's stealth mode and a tracer swallowed by Todd, after which Batman, Robin and the Red Hood fight off their opponents together. The Red Hood once again flees during the battle with Scarlet by his side, hijacking a helicopter and preventing Batman and Robin from taking chase by setting off a series of charges throughout Gotham, with the promise to set off more. Batman and Robin reluctantly take off to defuse the bombs, while Jason Todd and Scarlet head towards an unknown destination.

==== "Earthly Delights: Scenes From A Work in Progress" (issue #26) ====
In the last issue of Batman and Robin before the 2011 New 52 relaunch of all of DC Comics' monthly titles, the main story is intercut with sepia-like pages of the main villain's origin. In it, Dick Grayson and Damian Wayne team up with Batman Incorporated representative Nightrunner to stop a breakout in Le Jardin Noir (The Black Garden), which acts as the Parisian equivalent of Arkham Asylum. The three attempt to quell a riot at the Louvre, which was incited by four Black Garden inmates, led by the mysterious Son of Man (garbed after the famous Magritte painting). The Son of Man appears to be obsessed with surrealist themes, which the Black Garden inmates apply to the famous museum.

The Id (an empathic manipulator), Sister Crystal (who possesses a hand that can turn anything into glass), Skin Talker (a man who makes hypnotic suggestions through the skin), and Ray Man (an illusion caster) initially cause trouble for all three. They eventually appear to splice Batman in half, turn Robin into glass, and Nightrunner into a cloth-like boneless structure. After a moment, Batman shakes off what is revealed as an illusion and rallies his allies, enabling them to take down the inmates. The three realize that the entire fight was being watched by the Son of Man. Bursting into the Son of Man's headquarters, Batman, Robin and Nightrunner watch as the Son of Man presents his story through a giant screen. Moments after his birth and his mother's subsequent death, the Son of Man's father decided to turn his son into a work of art. It is revealed that the father mutilates his infant son's face, taking his inspiration from Victor Hugo's The Man Who Laughs.

The Son of Man (whose face is not shown throughout the course of the issue) reveals himself to be a red-haired lookalike of the Joker, after which he attempts to blow up the heroes using a remote-control device. Batman manages to stop him by using a riot foam dispenser he used against Sister Crystal. After his arrest, another surprise is revealed: the Son of Man, obsessed with the surreal, has managed to keep his father alive eternally by taking apart his body, encasing each part (including the organs) in a glass case. His father, now dismembered and arranged to form an art sculpture, is forced to watch the same sepia-colored home videos of his infant child in a continuous loop. The Son of Man's real name (Norman S. Rotrig) is a reference to the original writer of the series (as an anagram of his name).

== Volume 2 ==
Batman and Robin
- Cover for Batman and Robin (vol. 2) #1, art by Patrick Gleason.

Publication information
- Publisher: DC Comics
- Schedule: Monthly
- Format: Ongoing
- Publication date: September 2011 – March 2015
- No. of issues: 45 (#1–40, plus issues numbered #0 and #23.1 through 23.4), a Batman and Robin: Futures End one-shot, 3 Annuals, and 2 Prestige Format One-Shots (as of April 2015)
- Main character(s): Bruce Wayne/Batman; Damian Wayne/Robin

Creative team
- Created by: Peter Tomasi; Patrick Gleason
- Written by: Peter Tomasi
- Penciller: Patrick Gleason

Following the timeline-altering Flashpoint storyline, DC Comics cancelled all of their ongoing superhero titles and relaunched 52 new series, all starting with #1 issues in an initiative called The New 52. Among the relaunched series was Batman and Robin.

The relaunched DC Universe features several notable differences from its previous incarnation, making all of the established heroes roughly five years younger than their previous versions before the relaunch. While much of Batman's history from the previous DC Universe remains intact, Bruce Wayne is again the only hero serving as Batman and as such, he has replaced Dick Grayson in this title. Volume 2 features the exploits of Bruce and Damian, father and son, as Batman and Robin.

The team of writer Peter Tomasi and artist Patrick Gleason return to the title upon the relaunch, telling a story of a man from Bruce's past arriving in Gotham as both a vigilante and enemy of Batman, as well as trying to seduce Damian away from a form of crimefighting that defies his lethal and unpredictable skill and nature. The series takes place between Justice League International and Batman: The Dark Knight.

Damian Wayne discovers it harder to work with Bruce and reveals that he prefers to work with Dick. When Bruce subjugates Damian to lessons that he had his previous "sons" undertake, he ends up telling Damian that he does not trust him. Morgan Ducard then strains the relationship between Damian and Bruce and manages to sway Damian over to his side. Morgan then takes Damian to his base with a prisoner and Damian reveals their alliance to be a ruse and gives away their location to Bruce. When Bruce arrives, a brutal battle ensues which ends with Damian killing Morgan and passing out.

Following the death of Damian Wayne in Batman Incorporated #8, the series continued, being known as Batman and... Each issue is meant to symbolize Bruce Wayne/Batman going through one of the five stages of grief. Batman and Red Robin #19 introduced Carrie Kelley, the Robin from the graphic novel The Dark Knight Returns to continuity as a former acting teacher of Damian's who is distrustful of his disappearance and Bruce Wayne's unconvincing explanations. Batman and Red Hood #20 sees Batman sabotage his repaired relationship with former Robin Jason Todd as he grows increasingly fixated on resurrecting Damian. Batman and Batgirl #21 saw Batman continue to alienate Batgirl despite her desire to repair their relationship, even offering to take up the mantle of Robin. Batman and Catwoman #22 saw a turning point in Batman's attitude as he assisted Catwoman in saving a young hostage from a group of terrorists. The issue ends with a silent appearance by Two-Face, hinting at the franchise's next story arc. Batman and Nightwing #23 concluded the '5 Stages of Grief' story arc with 'Acceptance'. Batman, with the help of Nightwing and a computerized simulation, is able to prove that he could have saved Damian, thus allowing him to finally move on from Damian's death. However, it is discovered that Alfred has been harboring feelings of tremendous guilt as he allowed Damian to leave the house against Bruce's orders the night that he died. Bruce consoles a heartbroken Alfred as he shuts down the simulation.

In September 2013, for "Villains Month", Batman and Robin centers on Two-Face, the Court of Owls, Ra's al Ghul and Killer Croc, in four point-one issues. Issue #23.1 shows Two-Face as he dispenses justice with the flip of the coin now that there is no Batman to stop him. In issue #23.2, some of the history of the Court of Owls is seen, as well as teasing a future storyline in Talon. In issue #37, published in December 2014, Batman revives Damian using a Chaos Shard. Damian returns to the role of Robin after this, though he finds himself endowed with Kryptonian-like superpowers due to the nature of his revival. These powers disappeared soon after, and Batman and Robin temporarily parted ways.

== Volume 3 ==
Batman and Robin
- Cover for Batman and Robin (vol. 3) #1, art by Simone Di Meo.

Publication information
- Publisher: DC Comics
- Schedule: Monthly
- Format: Ongoing
- Publication date: September 2023 – February 2026
- No. of issues: 30 (plus 1 Annual)
- Main character(s): Batman; Robin

Creative team
- Created by: Joshua Williamson; Simone Di Meo
- Written by: Joshua Williamson (#1-13, 2024 annual); Phillip Kennedy Johnson (#14-30)
- Artists: Simone Di Meo (#1-4, 7, 9-10); Nikola Čižmešija (#5-6, 8-10); Juan Ferreyra (#11-13); Javier Fernández (#14-15, 17-19, 21-22); Carmine Di Giandomenico (#15-18, 21-22, 24); Miguel Mendonça (#16, 18, 20, 23-24); Fico Ossio (#25-27, 29-30); Stefano Raffaele (#28)

As part of the "Dawn of DC" initiative, a new Batman and Robin ongoing series was announced at MegaCon Orlando on March 31, 2023. Written by Joshua Williamson with artwork by Simone Di Meo, the series reunited Bruce Wayne and Damian Wayne as Batman and Robin following the events of Batman vs. Robin, Lazarus Planet, Knight Terrors, and "Gotham War". The first issue was published on September 12, 2023. Di Meo served as the primary artist for the opening "Father and Son" storyline (#1–7), while Nikola Čižmešija and Mikel Janín provided artwork for selected issues during the subsequent "Growing Pains" arc. Williamson remained the series' writer through issue #13 before departing the title in 2024. His run was collected in two trade paperbacks: Batman and Robin Vol. 1: Father and Son, collecting issues #1–6, and Batman and Robin Vol. 2: Growing Pains, collecting issues #7–13.

Bruce Wayne and Damian Wayne reunite as Batman and Robin, moving into a Gotham City brownstone in an effort to rebuild their relationship. As Damian adjusts to life as a high school student, Gotham's criminals are transformed into monstrous versions of themselves through a conspiracy orchestrated by the White Rabbit and the mysterious Shush, a masked woman with extensive knowledge of Bruce's past.

While Batman investigates the source of the mutations, Damian balances his duties as Robin with his attempts to adapt to ordinary teenage life. The pair uncover Shush's plot to exploit Batman's psychological vulnerabilities and use Gotham's mutated villains to weaken him. Although Batman and Robin thwart the scheme and defeat Shush's agents, Shush escapes, leaving her identity and larger plans unresolved. The storyline concludes with Bruce and Damian strengthening their partnership as father and son while continuing their efforts to restore normalcy to their lives.

== Collected editions ==
Title	Material collected	Pages	Published date	ISBN
Volume 1
Batman and Robin Vol. 1: Batman Reborn	Batman and Robin (vol. 1) #1-6	160	April 2010	1-4012-2566-7
Batman and Robin Vol. 2: Batman vs. Robin	Batman and Robin (vol. 1) #7-12	160	November 2010	1-4012-2833-X
Batman and Robin Vol. 3: Batman and Robin Must Die!	Batman and Robin (vol. 1) #13-16; Batman: The Return #1	168	May 2011	1-4012-3091-1
Batman and Robin Vol. 4: Dark Knight vs. White Knight	Batman and Robin (vol. 1) #17-25	208	January 2012	1-4012-3373-2
Absolute Batman and Robin: Batman Reborn	Batman and Robin (vol. 1) #1-16, Batman: The Return #1	488	November 2012	978-1401237370
Batman by Grant Morrison Omnibus Vol. 2	Batman and Robin (vol. 1) #1-16	760	June 2019	1-4012-8883-9
Volume 2
Batman and Robin Vol. 1: Born to Kill	Batman and Robin (vol. 2) #1-8	192	July 2012	1-4012-3487-9
Batman and Robin Vol. 2: Pearl	Batman and Robin (vol. 2) #0, #9-14	160	June 2013	978-1401242671
Batman and Robin Vol. 3: Death of the Family	Batman and Robin (vol. 2) #15-17, Batman (vol. 2) #17, Batman and Robin Annual #1	144	November 2013	978-1401242688
Batman and Robin Vol. 4: Requiem for Damian	Batman and Robin (vol. 2) #18-23	144	June 2014	978-1401246181
Batman and Robin Vol. 5: The Big Burn	Batman and Robin (vol. 2) #24-28, Batman and Robin Annual #2	176	December 2014	978-1401250591
Batman and Robin Vol. 6: The Hunt for Robin	Batman and Robin (vol. 2) #29-34, Robin Rises: Omega #1	256	June 2015	978-1401253349
Batman and Robin Vol. 7: Robin Rises	Batman and Robin (vol. 2) #35-40, Robin Rises: Alpha #1, Batman and Robin Annual #3	240	November 2015	978-1401256777
Batman and Robin by Peter J. Tomasi and Patrick Gleason Omnibus	Batman and Robin (vol. 1) #20-22, Batman and Robin (vol. 2) #0-40, #23.1, Batman and Robin Annual #1-3, Robin Rises: Omega #1, Robin Rises: Alpha #1, Secret Origins #4, Detective Comics (vol. 2) #27	1248	November 2017	978-1401276836
DC Comics The New 52 Villains Omnibus	Batman and Robin (vol. 2) #23.1–23.4 and Action Comics (vol. 2) #23.1–23.4, Aquaman (vol. 7) #23.1–23.2, Batman (vol. 2) #23.1–23.4, Batman/Superman #3.1, Batman: The Dark Knight (vol. 2) #23.1–23.4, Detective Comics (vol. 2) #23.1–23.4, Earth 2 #15.1–15.2, The Flash (vol. 4) #23.1–23.3, Green Arrow (vol. 6) #23.1, Green Lantern (vol. 5) #23.1–23.4, Justice League (vol. 2) #23.1–23.4, Justice League Dark #23.1–23.2, Justice League of America (vol. 2) #7.1–7.4, Superman (vol. 3) #23.1–23.4, Swamp Thing (vol. 5) #23.1, Teen Titans (vol. 4) #23.1–23.2, Wonder Woman (vol. 4)#23.1–23.2	1184	December 2013	978-1401244965
Futures End: Five Years Later Omnibus	Batman and Robin: Futures End #1 and Action Comics: Futures End #1, Aquaman: Futures End #1, Aquaman and the Others: Futures End #1, Batgirl: Futures End #1, Batman: Futures End #1, Batman/Superman: Futures End #1, Batwing: Futures End #1, Batwoman: Futures End #1, Birds of Prey: Futures End #1, Booster Gold: Futures End #1, Catwoman: Futures End #1, Constantine: Futures End #1, Detective Comics: Futures End #1, Earth 2: Futures End #1, Grayson: Futures End #1, Green Arrow: Futures End #1, Green Lantern: Futures End #1, Green Lantern Corps: Futures End #1, Green Lantern: New Guardians: Futures End #1, Harley Quinn: Futures End #1, Infinity Man and the Forever People: Futures End #1, Justice League: Futures End #1, Justice League Dark: Futures End #1, Justice League United: Futures End #1, New Suicide Squad: Futures End #1, Red Hood and the Outlaws: Futures End #1, Red Lanterns: Futures End #1, Sinestro: Futures End #1, Star Spangled War Stories Featuring G.I. Zombie: Futures End #1, Superboy: Futures End #1, Supergirl: Futures End #1, Superman: Futures End #1, Superman/Wonder Woman: Futures End #1, Swamp Thing: Futures End #1, Teen Titans: Futures End #1, The Flash: Futures End #1, Trinity of Sin: Pandora: Futures End #1, Trinity of Sin: Phantom Stranger: Futures End #1, Wonder Woman: Futures End #1, Worlds’ Finest: Futures End #1	912	December 2014	978-1401251291
Volume 3
Batman and Robin Vol. 1: Father and Son	Batman and Robin (vol. 3) #1-6, 2024 Annual	208	August 2024	978-1779527004
Batman and Robin Vo. 2: Growing Pains	Batman and Robin (vol. 3) #7-13	192	February 2025	978-1799500292
Batman and Robin Vol. 3: Memento	Batman and Robin (vol. 3) #14-19	160	July 2025	978-1799501008
Batman and Robin Vol. 4: The Gotham Cycle	Batman and Robin (vol. 3) #20-24	176	February 2026	978-1799507598
Batman and Robin Vol. 5: The Quiet Man	Batman and Robin (vol. 3) #25-30	152	July 2026	978-1799508427
