= List of The Books of Magic characters =

The Books of Magic is a four-issue mini-series published by DC Comics written by Neil Gaiman, later revived as an ongoing series written by John Ney Rieber (issues #1–50) and Peter Gross (issues #51–75). The comics told the story of Timothy Hunter, a teenager who was destined to grow up into his world's greatest magician. It finished after 75 issues, before being relaunched as Hunter: The Age of Magic by writer Dylan Horrocks.

== Family ==
Character	First appearance	Last appearance	Notes
Timothy Hunter	The Books of Magic Book One: The Invisible Labyrinth	Hunter: The Age of Magic #25 / Books of Magick: Life During Wartime #15	Timothy Hunter is a lead character in the series, a normal teenage boy with the destiny to be the greatest magician of his age. The Books of Magick series featured multiple worlds and alternate versions of established Vertigo characters and so it is uncertain if its Timothy Hunter was the original or not.
William "Bill" Hunter	The Books of Magic Book Two: The Shadow World	The Books of Magic #59: "Falling Apart"	Tim's father, who struggles to maintain a relationship with his son after retreating from the world when his wife died in a car accident. Bill was the driver, and lost an arm in the accident, torturing himself by keeping the wrecked car in his front garden until Tim had it removed by the Wobbly. His relationship with Tim was made worse when the boy discovered from his birth certificate that Mary Hunter was already pregnant when she met Bill and he had to admit that he wasn't Tim's biological father. Soon after, Bill was severely injured in a fire, but made such a complete recovery at the hands of Mister Vasuki that even his missing arm grew back: Vasuki was a demon, and caused Bill to turn into a ravenous monster on the occasion of his second marriage. Recovering from his experiences, and finding love again with Holly, helped him rebuild his relationship with his son, and the two enjoyed a much closer relationship despite not seeing much of each after Tim was enrolled in Bardsley boarding school. This lasted very short: following the death of his second wife, Bill fell apart and was about to be sectioned when Thomas Currie killed him in order to provide Tim the emotion trauma needed to allow the boy to subconsciously use his magic to escape his Other.
Mary Hunter	Died before the series began. Grave is first seen in The Books of Magic #5: "The Hidden School".	Died before the series began.	Mary Hunter is Tim's mother, who died when he was very young in a car accident. Throughout the series, the loss of her is said to have had a profound effect on Tim, and alternate versions of him living in universes where she didn't die are shown to be happy and unaware of magic. Seeds given to Tim by Death of the Endless were planted on her grave and produced strawberries that allowed anyone eating them to experience her memories. These were mostly being misused by people for selfish reasons, but Gwen collected some and made them into jam in the hope that Tim would one day get to taste them. Tim later discovered that a necklace his mother always wore was actually a glamour-stone, making her appear human.
Tamlin the Falconer	Arcana: The Books of Magic Annual #1	The Books of Magic #4: "Lost Causes"	Loyal human subject - and lover - of Titania, the Faerie Queen, who was revealed to be Tim's biological father, he has the ability to transform himself into a falcon. He kidnaps Tim and takes him to Faerie to make the boy aware of how the land is withering and dying, hoping that his raw magic can cure it. When Tim nearly dies from Manticore venom, Tamlin performs a magic ritual to allow him to die in his son's place. Tim meets a dream of Tamlin briefly when it wanders from the Dreaming, giving him a chance of pretending he had said goodbye.
Holly Ransome	The Books of Magic #14: "What Fire Leaves Us"	The Books of Magic #67: "A Day, A Night, and a Dream Part Two"	Mother of Cyril, she first meets William Hunter when he is returning from hospital after the fire and her son mistakes him for the invisible man: embarrassed, she offers to let William share her taxi home, and a relationship grows from there. She initially decided to give the relationship a chance after having to get an abortion when her previous boyfriend turned out to be married and deciding that she would have a better chance at a stable relationship if she ignored her instincts and went out with a man she didn't find attractive. She marries Tim's father as angels and demons are fighting over the boy's magic, but blames her hazy memories of the day on too much alcohol. She is shown to be a very kind woman, but feels increasingly awkward around Tim and thinks he needs discipline to stop him running wild: her solution is to enroll him in Bardsley, where Cyril is also a pupil, which Tim manages to fool her into thinking is working despite the fact that he stops attending to receive private tuition in magic from Thomas Currie. In an incidence of déjà vu, Holly is fatally injured when a car driven by Bill Hunter crashes after he unexpectedly sees Tim's Other at the side of the road. Tim meets her again briefly at the Inn Between the Worlds, where she has wandered from Death's domain and apologises to him for not trying hard enough before being collected by the Coach of the Dead.
Cyril Ransome	The Books of Magic #14: "What Fire Leaves Us"	The Books of Magic #75: "The Closing: Inner Child"	Holly's son and Tim's stepbrother, Cyril is shown to be spoiled, selfish, vain and extremely jealous of Tim. This often leads him into trouble, on one occasion nearly becoming the victim of a demon who seduced him by saying how clever and special he was, and on another happily being beatified by two angels and going on a rampage of destruction that led to the death of Tim's guardian angel, Araquel. He is also dangerously unhinged, having decided that since his mother said he had no father, he is the second Son of God sent to the Earth to be the God of the Dead. Despite this, he is extremely intelligent and is in Tim's year at Bardsley despite being the younger of the two. He remains adversarial towards Tim until the two eventually come to an arrangement: Tim pretends to attend Bardsley when in truth he is receiving instruction from Thomas Currie, and Cyril keeps Tim's secret in exchange for keeping the school all to himself. With the death of his mother and stepfather, however, he is expelled from Bardsley and runs away with Tim, unknowingly disguised as a troll after stealing a glamour from Thomas Currie. The two part company when Cyril gets stuck on a train track and Tim refuses to help free him, and narrowly escaping death Cyril sells information about the Opener to the demon Barbatos in exchange for the knowledge to use his glamour stone properly and a bot that brings the dead back to life. He lives in the cellar of Bardsley college with the reanimated corpse of his mother, until Tim comes seeking his hidden magic and destroys the pot, Holly's body and seemingly Cyril. A horribly disfigured Cyril survives and hides the extent of his injuries with his glamour stone, swearing revenge on Tim.

== The Trenchcoat Brigade ==
Character	First appearance	Last appearance	Notes
John Constantine	The Books of Magic Book One: The Invisible Labyrinth	The Books of Magic #52: "Homecoming"	A magician originally from Liverpool now active in London, he introduced Tim to the key players in the modern world of magic, and protected him from the Cult of the Cold Flame. John made an impression on the young boy, and was the only member of the Trenchcoat Brigade that Tim regularly used to think about and compare himself to. He made occasional appearances in the ongoing series - usually in flashback - and guest starred in the Hellblazer/The Books of Magic two-issue crossover. An alternate version of Constantine was a regular character in the Books of Magick series.
Doctor Occult/Rose Psychic	The Books of Magic Book One: The Invisible Labyrinth	The Books of Magic #6: "Sacrifices: Part 1 - Instruments"	A supernatural detective, Doctor Occult showed Tim the realms that exist alongside the real world, most significantly taking him on his first journey to Faerie. When Occult crossed into Faerie, "he" immediately became Rose, the woman who had in previous appearances been Occult's assistant. This was never explained until later appearances provided two contradictory but similar explanations, with the most recent being in the Justice Society Returns miniseries. Occult didn't appear again in the ongoing comic, save for a brief flashback to the battle to save Tim from the Cult of the Cold Flame.
The Phantom Stranger	The Books of Magic Book One: The Invisible Labyrinth	The Books of Magic #6: "Sacrifices: Part 1 - Instruments"	A mysterious figure of unknown origins, the Stranger showed Tim the history of magic from the creation of the universe up to the previous generation of fallen magicians. He was also the person who tricked Tim into learning about magic, telling the boy that he would choose whether to believe in magic after he had been taught about it when in truth the decision was made before his journey began. The Stranger didn't appear again in the ongoing comic, save for a brief flashback to the battle to save Tim from the Cult of the Cold Flame.
Mister E	The Books of Magic Book One: The Invisible Labyrinth	The Books of Magic #6: "Sacrifices: Part 1 - Instruments"	A devoutly religious magician, abused and blinded in his childhood by his father, E was tasked with showing Tim the possible futures nearest to them, but instead took him all the way forward to the end of the universe. Acutely aware of the possibility that Tim could be a force for evil as well as a force for good, he was of the opinion that the quickest way to resolve the matter would be to kill Tim: he was only stopped by the intervention of Death of the Endless, who returned Tim to his proper time and set E walking the long way back before she closed the universe for good. Mister E didn't appear again in the ongoing comic, save for a brief flashback to the battle to save Tim from the Cult of the Cold Flame.

== Children ==
Character	First appearance	Last appearance	Notes
Molly O'Reilly	The Books of Magic #5: "The Hidden School"	Hunter: The Age of Magic #25	Molly is a young girl with a troubled past who is nevertheless sensible, fun-loving and fearless, and is thought by some to be Tim's Other. She knows that she is in love with Tim, and sets out to make him her boyfriend. She succeeds, but the relationship hits problems very early on when she discovers that a possible future version of her Tim has spent many years abusing numerous versions of herself. Tim overhears her discussing the problem with Circe and Marya and subsequently runs away. Trying to get back to him, Molly ends up trapped in Faerie and cursed so that she can never eat human food again nor set foot on real ground: gaining Titania's sympathy, she is enchanted to float slightly above the ground and given a magic bag that will always give her Faerie food to eat. When she is reunited with Tim, he fails to notice her predicament and when Molly discovers that he has been keeping secrets from her, she breaks up with him and returns home. She makes a final attempt to talk to Tim but mistakenly meets his real Other instead, who manages to make her give up any hope of a reconciliation. She does, however, manage to release herself from her enchantment when she travels again to Faerie with Yarrow and is cured by a magic stone that makes her Faerie's guardian and protector. Following that, she attempts to regain some normality: she enrols in art college in Paris and gets a new boyfriend, meeting Tim again after her graduation and settling their differences. A The Books of Faerie story suggests that Molly was destined to become Queen of Faerie, although due to the nature of the story it is possible that this was an alternate version of the character. An alternate version of Molly also appears in the Books of Magick.
Daniel	Arcana: The Books of Magic Annual #1	The Books of Magic #21: "Heavy Petting"	A Victorian era chimney sweep and urchin who escaped to Free Country, where he developed an infatuation with Marya, he is expelled from Free Country when he kills another child, and decides to track down Marya, thinking that Tim has stolen her from him. Instead, he meets his old acquaintance the Reverend Slagingham, who magically transforms him into a creature partly made of dust and soot. He attacks Tim, Molly and Marya, but is eventually convinced to stop when Marya rejects him entirely. He makes one final attempt to force her to love him, attacking Marya and Molly as they talk with Circe: the mysterious tattooist stops him easily, and transforms him into the animal his soul most resembles - a stupid, affectionate and loyal dog.
Marya	Arcana: The Books of Magic Annual #1	The Books of Magic #21: "Heavy Petting"	Marya is a daughter of a servant to the Russian royal family who was chosen by "Empress Anna" (possibly Anastasia) to train as a dancer. Instead, she escaped to Free Country, where she remained until she returned to the real world to recruit Tim and didn't go back. She enrolls in a dance academy, where she becomes friends with fellow student Molly, and is overjoyed to discover that she knows Tim as well. When she meets the unicorn that has been following Tim since he freed it from the Manticore, she forms an immediate bond with it (implying that she is still a virgin) and it continues to appear with her throughout the series, protecting her from dangers such as Daniel. She repeatedly has to convince Daniel that she never had feelings for him, but once he is transformed into a dog she finds him cute and promises to take care of him.
Jimmy	Arcana: The Books of Magic Annual #1	The Books of Magic #43: "King of This"	A childhood friend of Tim's who ends up living rough on the streets, he is transformed into a plastic toy by the Reverend Slagingham, and ends up on the counter of a junk shop. Tim finds him there and buys him, hoping that he can reverse the magic that has transformed him. After a later meeting with Death of the Endless at the sea-side, Tim realises that he has to let go and move on: there is no bringing Jimmy back, and he hands him over to her. Jimmy's body is later recovered from the sea. He is seen again as his mother uses the strawberry's on Mary Hunter's grave to experience her memories of Jimmy and Tim as little children.
Davis Duvall	The Books of Magic #53: "The New School"	The Books of Magic #73: "Chasing Barbatos"	Tim's first friend at Bardsley, who initially lets him join his persecuted gang "The Lords of Bardsley" because of a confusion over Tim admitting that he might be "half-Faerie" and then offers him protection because "anyone [the bullies] hate as much as [Tim] has to be worth getting to know". He comes from a well-to-do family, and was shipped to Bardsley as something of an embarrassment, where he is ostracised because he is gay.

== The Fair Folk ==
Character	First appearance	Last appearance	Notes
Queen Titania of Faerie	The Books of Magic Book Three: The Twilight Kingdom	The Books of Magic #75: "The Closing: Inner Child"	The current queen of Faerie, a proud but dedicated ruler of her people who is nevertheless quick to anger and often cruel in her revenge. She first encountered Tim when he was brought to her realm by Rose. Titania attempted to trap him with her by giving him a key that would unlock any door, which she assumed had such value that the boy would be unable to repay her with a gift of similar worth and so would have to remain in her service until he could. On her unfortune, Tim had come into possession of a Mundane Egg - the seed of a new world - which he gave to her to repay his debt. She is married to King Auberon, her second husband, but the relationship is troubled by mutual infidelities and a belief that the other has fallen out of love: in truth, both still hold great affection for each other, but struggle to show it under the burden of the crown. For Titania, this is complicated by the fact that she is not a pureblood Faerie as her husband believes but a human sourceress disguised by a powerful glamour taken from the previous Queen, Mab. Her interactions with Tim are clouded by the fact that he could well expose her: one of her early affairs was with the falconer Tamlin and produced a fully human child that had to be spirited away to the Mundane World under the pretence that he had died in childbirth. Titania believes Tim Hunter to be this child, but when she meets a dream of Tamlin he taunts her by saying that his one true love was always the mother of his child, Mary Hunter: as this was a dream created by Tim, however, it may be that it didn't know the true nature of Tim's parentage. Titania swears never to have anything to do with Tim again after trying to return the Mundane Egg to him and being rejected.
King Auberon of Faerie	The Books of Magic #10: "The Artificial Heart: Book 2 - Bleak Houses Hard Times"	The Books of Magic #75: "The Closing: Inner Child"	A purebred Faerie and the rightful King of Faerie, Auberon left his trusted uncle in charge of the throne in his early life, whilst he searched for his missing sister. Due to the machinations of the Amadan, his uncle refused to relinquish the throne of Auberon's return and had to be defeated in the field of war. Upon his victory, Auberon attempted to heal the divide in his kingdom by marrying his uncle's wife, Queen Titania. This political expediency caused Titania to believe Auberon had no feelings for her, but he is shown to have great love and affection for her: despite Titania's accusations of his infidelity, the only person he is shown making love to is his wife, having to disguise himself and become her chambermaid just to be close to her. Becoming disenchanted with the Fair Kingdom, Auberon walked in the Mundane World, where he was tricked into surrendering his soul by Gwen. Although the soul was eventually returned, with the help of Tim, the time he spent as a mindless servant changed him, and caused him to devote himself even more to his duties as a husband and king.
The Amadan	The Books of Magic #1: "Tearing Down"	The Books of Magic #37: "Rites of Passage: Locked In"	The fool to the Seelie Court, the Amadan seems to be a small and fawning Flitling, but in truth is a master manipulator and dangerous enemy, so much so that at times even Titania seems wary of him. He began life as a human-sized Faerie who was the illegitimate and unrecognised son of the Faerie King Magnus and a hag, and the exact details of his transformation have yet to be explained. It was the Amadan's manipulation that led to the death of his father, the unseating of Queen Dymphna and the eventual succession of King Auberon and Queen Titania - a carefully laid series of manipulations that he carried out seemingly for no more reason than it amused him to know that he could. Reduction in size does not reduce his bitterness nor his taste for intrigue - it is the Amadan who brings Molly to Faerie and forces her to delay there, a course of action that ultimately nearly results in the complete destruction of the whole land. This causes the masses to turn against him, looking for revenge for the loss of their homes and livelihoods. He finds himself outwitted and displaced, ultimately, by a meek Flitling called Yarrow.
Yarrow	The Books of Magic #28: "Rites of Passage: Part Two - This Is Not About Chocolate"	The Books of Faerie - Molly's Story Book 4: The Importance of Being Evil	Yarrow is one of the breed of tiny fairies known as Flitlings, a nervous and quiet little thing who attends the Queen. She is one of those who flocks to watch Molly as she attempts the unheard of feat of growing vegetables in Faerie, which provokes Titania's jealousy and results in Molly being tricked and cursed. As Molly cuts a swathe across Faerie, Yarrow knows in her heart that the true blame lies with Titania, and tries to help Molly as best she can. Along the way, she manages to convince the Amadan that the only way to escape a hoard of Faeries baying for his blood is to turn himself into a statue and then beheads him when he complies and throws his head into the crowd. Taking his place as the Fool of the Forthing, Yarrow is tested by Huon the Leveller with all of Faerie hanging in the balance: when she passes, Yarrow ensures not just the survival of the land, but its rebirth as a new and brighter place.
Prince Taik	The Books of Magic #28: "Rites of Passage: Part Two - This Is Not About Chocolate"	The Books of Magic #38: "Rites of Passage Conclusion: A World of One"	Taik is the son of Auberon and Titania, and heir to the throne of Faerie, but he was given to the Lords of Hell as payment of the tithe on the land of Faerie, where he was part-possessed by a demon. He escaped and was transformed into a horse by his mother to disguise his true nature and prevent Hell seeking retribution from Faerie. Later, when he befriended Molly as a horse named Prince, it ultimately led to him being freed from his enchantment and Hell making war on Faerie. The demon that infected Taik attempted to kill Molly, but was held back by Auberon until Taik could best and destroy it himself. Following the rebirth of Faerie after the Leveller's visit, the land no longer owed tithe to Hell and the restored Prince Taik was free to remain in Faerie.

== Myths, legends and other creatures ==
Character	First appearance	Last appearance	Notes
Death of the Endless	The Books of Magic Book Four: The Road to Nowhere	Hunter: The Age of Magic	A cheerful goth girl who is also the personification of death, she first meets Tim at the end of the universe, saving him from Mister E and sending him home. She meets him again as he lies dying from the Manticore venom, and tries to get him to think clearly about what difference finding his true parents would make to him. She makes infrequent appearances, usually trying to help Tim learn something important, such as how to let go of his friend Jimmy and let him move on.
The Unicorn	The Books of Magic #2: "A Book of Leaves"	The Books of Magic #21: "Heavy Petting"	Tim first encountered the unicorn as a stuffed exhibition in the home of the Manticore, having been destroyed by the creature's unique form of magic: the Manticore managed to convince magicians and magical creatures that magic did not exist, literally reducing the unicorn itself to a moth-eaten stuffed horse with a horn badly sewn to its forehead. Tim's magic restores the unicorn, and it gores the Manticore before escaping its prison. It reappears later when Tim, Molly and Marya are being threatened by Daniel, and allows Marya to ride it to safety. It forms a bond with the young girl, and returns to protect her whenever she is threatened - goring Daniel, for example, to save her. Marya says that the unicorn comes when she calls "Apples", but she doesn't think that is actually its name.
Leah	The Books of Magic #6: "Sacrifices: Part 1 - Instruments"	The Books of Magic #75: "The Closing: Inner Child"	A young American girl who moves to Tim's school with her "father" Martyn: in truth he is a magician and the last surviving member of the Cult of the Cold Flame, and she is a succubus under his reluctant control. Alleatha (known as Leah) lives in a small wooden box most of the time, eating white doves and killing men at her master's command. He instructs her to seduce Tim, but she relents because his feelings for Molly stop him from responding, although she does consider the possibility that the boy was just too scared. When Martyn is killed, she tries to make Tim her new master but instead he sets her free: she travels to America where she becomes a model and is "hungry all the time" because she has given up eating living creatures. She meets Tim there when he is trying to reach Zatanna, and travels with him for a while, attempting to seduce him disguised as Molly before Tim admits that she didn't need the disguise to sleep with him. She is kidnapped by a dying mermaid and forced to become her replacement in another world to save Tim. Annoyed that Tim carries on his travels without even trying to look for her, she returns and forces him to live out a pseudo-lifetime trapped in her wooden box in the hope that he would learn something about himself and his connection to magic and the world.
Happy	The Books of Magic #8: "Sacrifices: Part 3 - Alters"	The Books of Magic #75: "The Closing: Inner Child"	A golem used by Martyn to protect his inner sanctum, "Happy" was rechristened by Tim when it grabbed him by the arm and wouldn't let go. Only Martyn should have been able to instruct it to release Tim, but as he was dead Tim had no choice but to use his magic to carve a smiley face on the golem and recreate it as his. Tim left Happy in Martyn's empty house, but took him as back-up when he and Tanger had to visit Hell to rescue Molly and Crimple. While they were there, Happy let Tanger sink his roots into its clay to prevent him from dying due to being "out of place".
Barbatos	The Books of Magic #5: "The Hidden School"	The Books of Magic #75: "The Closing: Inner Child"	A blue-skinned, baby-like demon who is fascinated by all the soul destroying things like advertising and junk food that humanity has created without any demonic intervention. He is intent on bringing these new inventions to the attention of Hell, and after gaining and selling a large number of Christian souls escaped from Hell, he has the finances to buy himself a Dukedom in Hell and the Ambassadorship to Earth. This brings him into contact with Tim's Other, whose raw power immediately makes the demon want to enslave him, but when Barbatos meets Cyril, he learns the truth about the Other and the true Tim, and steals the magic that Thomas Currie hid: Barbatos steals it, and when Tim comes to reclaim it, the demon manipulates the Opener into selling him a memory in exchange for help defeating the Other. The memory Barbatos takes is the memory of the creation of the Other, returning him and all the other Tims from the thousands of alternate worlds back to the original. Whole for the first time in his life, Tim has no time to enjoy it, as his soul is forfeit to Barbatos. The demon uses the boy for his own ends for forty years, tricking him into believing that he is the master who lives in the lap of luxury when in truth he is a homeless slave to Barbatos. But Barbatos has to come back to the past from 2012 when he realises that a younger Tim is the last boy in the multiverse who could grow up to be the boy who sold him his memory. When he faces up to Tim, he is defeated and trapped in an outskirt of the Dreaming. He manages to escape for a while when he finds a new master, a frog who he turns into a giant and promises a great pond to whilst enslaving the population of Faerie and selling them as dolls on Earth, but this time he crosses swords with Molly, and is trapped back in the Dreaming when she convinces his "master" to become just a frog again. After forty years, he is eventually released and discovers that Tim Hunter had tricked him all along: when the boy sold the memory to the demon, he hid his soul inside it leaving the body that Barbatos enslaved a soulless automaton. Tim's soul slowly takes control of Barbatos' body, eventually exorcising the demon from it completely and reshaping it to look like Tim as a fourteen-year-old.
Mister Vasuki	The Books of Magic #14: "What Fire Leaves Us"	The Books of Magic #48: "Slave of Heavens: Inconvenience, Be Not Proud"	Vasuki is a demon who poses as a doctor to magically cure Tim's father when he is badly burned. Later, when the demons go to war against the angels, he uses the power this gives him over William to transform him again into a ravenous beast. He attempts to blackmail Tim and Araquel into joining his side or watching Tim's father devour a nun, before being trapped along with the other demons and angels in Awn the Blink's angel and demon trapper.
Araquel	The Books of Magic #5: "The Hidden School"	The Books of Magic #49: "Slave of Heavens: When All Else Fails"	Araquel is Tim's guardian angel but he is fallen, chained between Heaven and Hell because he had a child with a Chaldean temple dancer. He is, however, tricked into breaking his chains by Barbatos, who gives him several unimportant errands to do to keep him away from Tim whilst the demon tries to enslave him. Although he is again fallen, instead of returning to his prison, he lives with his daughter and Khara for a while, content to ignore Tim and let him fend for himself. He is forced to intervene, however, when Tim releases his magic into the world and the angels and the demons both threaten Araquel's family to force him to join the war to claim the magic on one side or the other. Ultimately, Araquel joins neither, and instead finds Tim to help him set things right. This leads to Araquel's death at the hands of the beatified Cyril, who has him transformed into chocolate by one of his minions.
Nikki	The Books of Magic #5: "The Hidden School"	The Books of Magic #42: "The Bridge"	Nikki is Araquel and Khara's daughter, a half-angel little girl. She is looked after by Khara, until her father comes home to live with them both.
Khara	The Books of Magic #5: "The Hidden School"	The Books of Magic #42: "The Bridge"	Khara is the woman Araquel fell from grace for, and Nikki's mother, looking after the child whilst her father is chained. She often arrives to help Tim, and in particular helps him to remove the moth tattoo that contributed to him losing Molly. When she returns to Nikki, she finds that Araquel has gone on the mission that ultimately claimed his life, and breaks down to cry.

== Imaginary friends ==
Like many children, Tim had an active imagination as a child and invented a number of imaginary friends to play with, but because of his power as an Opener, these friends became real and continued to exist long after he had forgotten them. As he became more aware of his power, so too did he become aware of his lost friends.

Character	First appearance	Last appearance	Notes
Tanger and Crimple	Vertigo Rave #1	The Books of Magic #75: "The Closing: Inner Child"	Two wood sprites who lived in a tree on the edge of a wasteground near Tim's home, they are forced to remain there by strict rules that meant they would die if they ever left their rightful place. They are very close and affectionate with each other, with Tanger seeming the elder and more experienced whilst Crimple seems more reckless and nervous. Both show great courage, however, when Molly wanders off into the dangerous wasteland: Crimple chases after her to help protect her, whilst Tanger eventually leaves his place at the tree to help Tim find Crimple. The two sprites travel separately through Hell until they are reunited and returned home, both having found new ways to survive after leaving their place. Tanger suggests that the two of them only resemble wood sprites because that is how Tim imagined them, and that both have served numerous Openers previously, with their natures and appearances changing depending on the Opener's imagination.
The Wobbly	Vertigo Rave #1	The Books of Magic #75: "The Closing: Inner Child"	A terrifying creature that resembles a bird's skull inside a flapping black cape, the Wobbly exists to destroy the things that Tim has thrown away. Its nature, however, gradually alters as Tim introduces it to the concept of recycling to prevent it from killing Crimple and then convinces it to leave its place to collect the car that his father was driving when Mary Hunter was killed. The wobbly claims to truly understand Tim because of the unique function the boy bestowed upon him, but this doesn't translate into sentiment: the creature was perfectly willing to "recycle" Tim when he collapsed from starvation after running away from home, and had to be convinced that Tim hadn't thrown himself away but was suffering hardships on the road to self-discovery.
Awn the Blink	The Books of Magic #10: "The Artificial Heart: Book 2 - Bleak Houses Hard Times"	The Books of Magic #75: "The Closing: Inner Child"	A cyborg mechanic, Awn the Blink is an "unrepairman" who can break any machine and conversely has the ability to repair and rebuild them as well. He has no specific place that he is tied to, and pops up wherever Tim needs him. It was Awn who convinced the Reverend Slagingham that his schemes wouldn't work, and who saved Tim when he got trapped in the sewers of London - all the time telling anyone who cared to listen that it was Tim who was the brave and clever one, and would have resolved the situation easily if Awn hadn't beat him to it. Because whenever the TV at home was "on the blink" Tim's father paid more attention to him, the young Tim assumed that Awn the Blink must be his friend and so he was. Awn also helped stop the war between the angels and the demons who were intent on claiming Tim's magic, building a trap for both sides that would hold them until the fighting was over.
Thomas Currie	The Books of Magic #51: "A Thousand Worlds of Tim"	The Books of Magic #61: "All Things Timothy"	A serious academic, Thomas Currie is tracking the true Timothy Hunter from amongst the thousands of alternate versions of him made unknowingly by the original every time he made a wish as a child. Thomas is attempting to save the true Tim from one particular alternative: Tim's Other has become aware of his own nature, and is slowly killing every version of Tim he can find to claim their power for himself. Ultimately, he wants to destroy the true Tim and take his place, something that, for the good of everyone, Currie must prevent, even by killing the true Tim himself. He takes a job at Bardsley to get close to the real Tim, educating him about the nature of his power and the responsibilities of his life, and all the times keeps a diary of what he learns about Tim that he calls The Books of Magic. It is revealed that Currie himself is the creation of an alternate Tim Hunter, travelled over from the perfect world protected by the all-powerful and kind version of Tim. When the Other arrives in the true world, Currie finds that he cannot kill the true Tim because he cannot face knowing that he was created by such a flawed creature: instead, he kills Tim's father, which causes Tim to subconsciously try to create an alternate world. Currie diverts this act of creation, and uses the power to recreate his own alternate Tim, who fights the Other whilst the true Tim escapes to Faerie to better learn to wield his magic. Currie proudly dies with his own Tim, hoping that the true Tim can learn to become as great and as good as his creator.

== Adversaries and sort-of friends ==
Character	First appearance	Last appearance	Notes
Sir Timothy Hunter	The Books of Magic #5: "The Hidden School"	The Books of Magic #20: "Playgrounds Epilogue: The Knight, The Dragon & The Maiden"	Sir Timothy Hunter is a future version of Tim, who sold a memory to Barbatos the demon and became his slave. Sir Timothy was convinced that he lived in luxury and was master of his own destiny, when in reality he lived in a cardboard box and carried out the demon's bidding. Barbatos keeps Sir Timothy in line by providing him with his favourite distraction - a neverending series of young, docile Molly O'Reillies that he spends his life abusing and humiliating. When Barbatos brings Sir Timothy back in time to try and ensure that Tim grows up to be him, Sir Timothy comes into contact with a powerful magical object that restores his mind. Genuinely ashamed and self-pitying at what he has become, Sir Timothy falls in with a group of dragons who transform him into one of them. When the dragon meets with the real Molly, he has enough time to confess his full list of sins to her and beg that she doesn't let her Tim become him before he is slain by Tim's uncontrolled anger. It is later revealed that Sir Timothy was in fact the soulless remnant of Tim's original body, and that the true Tim's soul lived on by hiding in the body of Barbatos.
The Reverend Slagingham	The Books of Magic #9: "The Artificial Heart: Book 1 - Handmedowns of the Ragged School"	The Books of Magic #75: "The Closing: Inner Child"	Slagingham was a reverend in the Victorian era, where he got to know Daniel before the boy disappeared. He prolonged his life through steampunk cybernetics and recruited an army of the cities underclass to help him in his ultimate dream: he thinks that happiness is a finite resource, and so he builds a machine that will steal it from others so that he can have his fair share. He runs a number of scans to raise funds for his grand endeavour - transforming street children into plastic toys to sell cheap, capturing souls in magical devices to build a workforce of mindless slaves - but when he meets Awn the Blink, he is convinced by the unmechanic of the pointlessness of his scheme, which breaks his mechanical heart. He survives as a disembodied head, going quite mad and hearing the voices of angels and demons - which it turns out he actually can hear when the two forces come to Earth to do battle. He redeems himself by helping Tim to end the battle, with Awn the Blink transforming him into an angel and demon catcher, where both sides are trapped until they agree to stop.
Gwendolyn	The Books of Magic #10: "The Artificial Heart: Book 2 - Bleak Houses Hard Times"	The Books of Magic #43: "King of This"	Gwen is a young Victorian girl who uses magic to prevent herself aging, falling in with the Reverend Slagingham to help him steal souls for his workforce. Her prize possession is the Faerie King Auberon, whose soul she tricked away when he was feeling particularly melancholic. She has a change of heart, however, when the sewers that the workforce flood and they all drown: the only one she can save is Auberon, because - not being human - he doesn't need to breathe. She gets Tim's assistance in returning Auberon's soul, and in gratitude looks after him until his father comes home from hospital. She stays on for a while to look after William and Tim, but when William begins a serious relationship with Holly she decides it is time to move out.
Zatanna Zatara	The Books of Magic Book Two: The Shadow World	The Books of Magic #41: "Nothing Up My Sleeve"	Zatanna is the magician daughter of the great Zatara, whom Tim sees whilst visiting in the past with the Phantom Stranger. She looked after Tim at the request of John Constantine while the Trenchcoat Brigade fought the Cult of the Cold Flame. Later, when he realised that he needed a mentor to teach him about magic, Tim decided to find Zatanna and ask her to take the job. He and Molly stayed with her for a while, and she tried to teach him that there were more important things than magic: his girlfriend, for example. Despite it, Tim couldn't learn and eventually it was all Zatanna could do to help Molly return home.
Circe	The Books of Magic #13: "Small Glass Worlds Part 2: Transparent Lies"	The Books of Magic #75: "The Closing: Inner Child"	Circe is a mysterious, powerful tattooist who sees it as her duty to protect women from worthless men. When she first meets Molly and hears about Tim, she thinks she has found another and captures him to study at her leisure. The amount of raw power he has scares her, and she looks into his soul to find out the truth about him: inside, she finds that most men are really animals, and turns them into whatever animal they might be. Tim, however, has no animal in him: he is just a frighteningly normal human boy. Still wishing to protect Molly, but unable to do anything without Tim's permission, she offers to give him a tattoo that will ensure he never hurts Molly. Tim agrees, and Circe gives him a tattoo that ultimately ensures that Tim is unable to connect to the world and pushes Molly away from him. She later feels regret about her actions. When she finds the Reverend Slagingham's head and learns of the war between the angels and the demons, she finds Tim and ultimately helps him to defeat both sides.
The Other	The Books of Magic #51: "A Thousand Worlds of Tim"	The Books of Magic #74: "The Closing: Being Mr. Wrong"	The Other is an alternative version of Tim created by the original's instinctive childhood use of magic: he lived on a world where both Tim's parents survived, but focused more on their careers than their son. The Other never came into contact with magic until he met the demon Barbatos, who revealed both the existence of magic and this Tim's nature as one of a number of alternate Tims. The Other dedicated himself to learning magic, and found a way to travel to another alternate world where he met another version of Tim: when this Tim died, the Other found that he absorbed all of his magic and feelings as the world he lived in was destroyed. Trying to return home, the Other discovered that his own world had also vanished as soon as he left it. He then starts hopping from world to world, killing each version of Tim he finds and stealing their power, gradually losing his humanity as he does. Ultimately, he reaches the real world with the intention of killing the true Timothy Hunter and usurping his power and his life - but when he thinks that he has, he finds the real world almost impossible to acclimatise to after years of wandering and killing. He is ultimately subsumed by the true Tim when Barbatos takes away the memory of the Other's creation, making it impossible for him to exist any more.
