= Faerie (DC Comics) =

Fictional place in the DC Comics uiniverse

- Timothy Hunter and Rose Psychic entering Faerie Market from The Books of Magic #3, artist Charles Vess.
- First appearance: The Books of Magic #3 (January 1990)
- Created by: Neil Gaiman (writer); Charles Vess (artist)

In-universe information
- Races: Sidhe, Elves, Brownies, Flitlings, Gnomes, Trolls, Goblins
- Locations: Avalon, Elvenhome, Dom-daniel, Goblin Market
- Publisher: DC Comics

Faerie, The Fair Lands or The Twilight Realm is one of two fictional otherdimensional homelands for the Faerie, as published by DC Comics. The Vertigo Comics realm of Faerie is an amalgam of the mythological realms of Álfheimr, Otherworld, the Fortunate Isles, Tír na nÓg and Avalon. This mix is heavily influenced by Shakespeare's play A Midsummer Night's Dream. It is home to the faeries and other mythical races, ruled over by the Seelie Court and King Auberon and Queen Titania. Faerie debuted in The Books of Magic #3, and was created by Neil Gaiman and Charles Vess.

== Publication history ==
As part of his comic The Sandman, writer Neil Gaiman planned a small arc involving William Shakespeare entering a deal with the Dream King to write plays that would live on after him. Having introduced Shakespeare, Gaiman then decided to tell the story of the first play that the writer wrote for Dream in payment of the bargain. He turned to his favourite of Shakespeare's plays, A Midsummer Night's Dream creating analogues of the play's main otherworldly characters and inventing the fiction that Shakespeare wrote the play to Dream's instructions to ensure that humans never forgot Faerie and its rulers. Having created her, Gaiman used Queen Titania as a recurring character throughout the series, and when he was asked part way through his run on The Sandman to write a four-issue miniseries to introduce DC's magical characters to a new audience he gave her a guest role in one of the issues of that as well. The Books of Magic miniseries showed Titania in her kingdom, meaning Gaiman had to create the realm of Faerie in more depth than he had previously shown it.

Gaiman showed a land known as the Fair Lands, Avalon, Elvenhome, Dom-daniel, the Land of Summer's Twilight or Faerie, based very much on classical representations of the fairy kingdom: faeries tempted children to live with them in the Twilight Country, with even Titania being waited on by Shakespeare's son Hamnett having tempted him to come with her at their first meeting. The realm is governed by strict rules of bartering, with the giving of gifts requiring the receiver to give a gift of equal value in return or forfeit their property or life to the giver; good manners are paramount. Nothing ages or dies, but nothing truly lasts either; the food available in the realm is extremely dangerous to the incautious and if eaten will make it impossible for the eater to consume real food again, forcing them to remain in Faerie forever. But Gaiman also acknowledged that his Faerie was a fiction, a land where metaphor was made real but also remained metaphor: when Timothy Hunter was taken to the land by Doctor Occult, the mystic admitted that in some ways the two of them were still sitting in a field exploring only their inner landscapes. Gaiman also showed an ambiguous section that was interpreted by some to suggest that Queen Titania was the mother of the comic's main character, Timothy Hunter, which ensured that the realm of Faerie was further explored when the mini-series became an ongoing series.

When he was chosen to replace Gaiman as the writer of the ongoing The Books of Magic series, John Ney Rieber discovered that a gaming guide to the DC universe had listed Titania as Hunter's mother: he also knew that a key part of the character's appeal was that he was a normal teenaged boy. Instead of simply denying the possibility of Tim being part Faerie, Rieber decided to use the idea as one of his ongoing storylines, whilst gently debunking it. This meant utilizing Titania and her cuckolded husband Auberon as supporting characters for most of his run on the comic, which in turn meant frequent visits and explorations to Faerie: the first storyline in the book showed Tim visiting a forgotten corner of the realm and introduced the idea that the land was slowly dying since it had been cut off from the Earth, and later storylines delved deeper into Faerie's past and present to build up a clearer picture of the Twilight Kingdom. Such was the importance of Faerie to Rieber's version of The Books of Magic that when its popularity caused DC to release a spin-off miniseries, they decided that a three issue mini-series about the early history of the kingdom (and Titania's rise to power) would be most suitable. Three volumes of The Books of Faerie were eventually published, each giving more detail and colour to DC's version of Faerie, and at one point there were even plans for an ongoing series to be set there. The series was never published, and Faerie's appearances in the DC universe have been brief since then.

== Fictional history ==
The faerie race was born and lived in the Mundane World for many centuries until frosty relationships with the growing race of men caused them to leave the world forever some time before the 16th century. Upon leaving the realm of their birth, the nine rulers of faerie led them on a search for a new world to call their own. The band of refugees were met by Lucifer, who offered them a corner of Hell to have as their own in exchange for the payment of a tithe. Lucifer claimed he was moved by sympathy for the faeries, having been forced to leave his own birth-realm, but when the faeries agreed to the deal the true nature of the tithe was revealed: eight of the nine rulers were taken to Hell to be tortured, leaving the last - Huon the Small - to remain as the first King of Faerie. In order to keep their land, Faerie was required to send nine of its fairest and best subjects to Hell every seven years, or risk war with the armies of Hell.

The faeries, unaware of the true price, settled into their new home; the land was transformed into lush world of happiness and nature, with the faeries maintaining links with the Mundane World and mortals often visiting the Twilight Kingdom. King Magnus came to the throne, instigating a dark time for the carefree realm: he believed in the innate superiority of pure-blood faeries and this led to the persecution of the other races, with Brownies becoming little more than slaves in the royal household. Magnus also discovered a worrying problem; a disorder in purebred faerie blood meant that it was extremely difficult for them to produce children naturally. He began secret experiments, trying to refresh the bloodline by interbreeding with mankind.

Ironically, Magnus' dalliances with other faeries did lead to a birth – an illegitimate and unrecognized son called the Amadan who grew to become Fool to the Seelie Court and mastermind of a thousand intrigues and manipulations. Magnus used to Amadan to provide contestants in gladiatorial games between the races, and was killed trying to prove the superiority of faeries fighting against a troll. This left a power vacuum in the Court that was eventually filled when Lord Obrey sought out the rightful heir to the throne, a young boy faerie called Auberon who was being looked after in the outskirts by his cousin Dymphna and brownie nursemaid Bridie.

Obrey helped Auberon to overcome challenges from rival Lords and succeed to the throne, but grew unhappy with his role as the Amadan's manipulations drove a wedge between him and the throne. Aware of the growing danger, the boy-king ran away from the Court to find his missing sister, leaving Obrey as his Regent to look after Faerie and her subjects. Obrey slipped into the role of king unchallenged, his own position made stronger by his marriage to Auberon's cousin Dymphna, and the two ruled for several years, reversing some of Magnus' more prejudiced practices to bring all the races of Faerie together.

Obrey, however, was also told of Magnus' discovery by the Amadan, and grew increasingly concerned for the survival of the faerie race. He adopted the same solution as Magnus, trying to promote interbreeding by encouraging human children to be enticed to stay in Faerie. One such child was the young girl Maryrose, who after being trapped in Faerie quickly became the favourite of Queen Dymphna. Assured by the Amadan that Maryrose would bear him a child, Obrey transformed Dymphna into a tree and took Maryrose as his new wife. Using a glamour stolen from the previous queen, Maryrose assumed the appearance of being a purebred Faerie and took the name Titania at her coronation.

When Auberon returned as a young man, Obrey refused to relinquish the throne and the Wars of Succession began. Shortly after his marriage, Obrey was killed in battle and - seeking to reunite the warring kingdom - Auberon took Titania as his wife as he reclaimed the throne. For political reasons, Auberon expected his wife to produce an heir as soon as possible. When she became pregnant, it was the result of an affair she had been having with a human falconer called Tamlin. When the child was born, it was clearly a purebred human, and Titania and her nanny conspired to convince Auberon that the child had been stillborn, with the nanny taking the child into the Mundane World to grow into adulthood.

Together, Titania and Auberon ruled Faerie through turbulent times: they made the final Severing between their world and Faerie and forbade their subjects to travel to other realms without their direct permission. This caused problems for the realm when it started to wither and die, forcing Titania and the Court to hide its true state behind powerful glamours. Eventually, the intervention of Tamlin brought an Opener (Timothy Hunter, who was possibly Titania's abandoned son) to the realm whose spilled blood restored its previous vigor. They also withstood a flitling rebellion, led by Briar Rose who was banished and transformed as a punishment. When Lucifer decided to quit his realm, Titania and Auberon hoped that they could convince the new owners to forfeit the tithe Faerie owed - their own son and heir Prince Taik having been claimed as payment - but this didn't come to fruition. The tithe was eventually annulled, however, when Huon the Small returned to the realm to judge its right to survive: thanks to the belief and loyalty of a flitling called Yarrow who was chosen as "The Leveller", the realm was recreated anew as the lush and fun-filled paradise it had always seemed to be with the connection to Hell severed forever.

Faerie faced further danger when the demon Barbatos used the magical gemstone called Twilight to bewitch a garden frog into a giant. Barbatos enslaved the faeries, forcing them to work themselves to death constructing a massive pond for the demon's "master". The intervention of Molly O'Reilly (ex-girlfriend of Timothy Hunter) released the faeries and banished Barbatos to an obscure corner of the Dreaming, and in return the gemstone Twilight chose her as its new owner and the chosen protector of Faerie and its peoples.

== The nature of faerie ==
Time moves different in Faerie than it does in the real world, and someone spending an hour there might find that they have been missing for weeks on their return. An example of this is that Titania's illegitimate son was born and taken to Earth shortly after her marriage, an unspecified amount of time before Auberon and Titania watched the first performance of A Midsummer Night's Dream on Earth sometime in the 1590s. Tim Hunter was born in 1983, and yet Titania has no difficulty in believing that he may be the same child.

== Inhabitants of Faerie ==
Faerie is home to a wide number of different races and creatures, some born on the Earth and escaping over to Faerie as man's influence grew, others coming from elsewhere and being tricked into staying, or deciding to settle of their own accord.

=== Notable residents ===
- Titania
- Auberon
- Faeries in The Sandman
- Faeries in The Books of Magic

=== Brownies ===
Brownies appear as small, leather-skinned humans and enjoy helping out with domestic chores around the home. They were particularly abused during the reign of King Magnus, whose prejudice towards them led to them being treated as little more than domestic slaves.

=== Flitlings ===
Flitlings are small, winged faeries who otherwise appear to be human, similar in appearance to the Cottingley Fairies. Flitlings are generally meek and unassuming, happy to flatter and fawn over the Seelie Court: Queen Titania has a small group of Flitling followers, and reacts jealously to anything that takes their attentions away from her. These roles, however, may be social rather than innate, as Flitlings have also shown great courage and strength: it was the Flitling Yarrow who stopped the riots following the "Burning Girl" attacks, and also ended the Faerie tithe to Hell, whilst the Flitling Briar Rose also led her race in rebellion against the condescension of the Seelie Court.

=== The Seelie ===
The dominant race of Faerie, also called the Theena Sidhe, seeming to be normal human beings save for certain cosmetic differences - horns, different coloured skin, or other minor differences. They can control their appearance through the use of magical glamours, and have a natural mastery of certain magics: they can escape from any prison, and some have the gift of prophesy. Their powers can be negated through the use of cold iron, and the metal is unwelcome in the Faerie realm. The Seelie find it particularly difficult to bear children with each other, and miscarriages and stillbirths are common. They are also able to interbreed with other races, such as humans. The Seelie Court rules over the other races of Faerie, modeled in the fashion of traditional European royalty.

=== The Unseelie ===
The wild and primal faeries of darkness, the Unseelie are seldom seen but are engaged in a perpetual war against the Seelie Court.

=== Trolls ===
Trolls are large creatures, exceptionally strong and usually with tusks. They are used in battle and for heavy lifting work, and are not often exceptionally intelligent.

== See also ==
- Gemworld
