= The Books of Faerie =

- Cover of the first The Books of Faerie collected edition, showing Queen Titania.

Publication information
- Publisher: DC Comics (Vertigo Comics)
- Format: Limited series
- Publication date: 1997–1999
- No. of issues: 10 full length issues 4 back-up strips
- Main character(s): Titania; Auberon

Creative team
- Created by: Neil Gaiman; Charles Vess
- Written by: Bronwyn Carlton; John Ney Rieber
- Artist(s): Peter Gross; Vince Locke; Ryan Kelly; Hermann Mejia
- Colorist(s): Gloria Vasquez; Danny Vozzo; Alex Sinclair

The Books of Faerie is a series of three miniseries spun off from Vertigo Comics' series The Books of Magic written by Bronwyn Carlton (two series) and John Ney Rieber (one series). It featured characters used predominantly in the parent series – Titania, Auberon and Molly O'Reilly – to tell stories set in the realm of Faerie prior to the start of The Books of Magic, and later in the present era.

== Background ==
The Books of Faerie was initially published as a spin-off when the ongoing The Books of Magic series written by John Ney Rieber proved to be popular with readers. Editor Stuart Moore approached writer Bronwyn Carlton to script the first three issue series: Carlton wrote a series which brought back some of the ambiguity around whether Timothy Hunter was Queen Titania's son that Reiber had attempted to dispel in his early issues on the parent title. The success of the series led to Carlton writing the next limited series, The Books of Faerie: Auberon's Tale, and a handful of back-up strips published in the main The Books of Magic monthly. These were well received by the audience.

In 1999, two new Books of Faerie projects were revealed, the first being a third miniseries called The Books of Faerie: Molly's Story starring the popular character of Molly O'Reilly and written by her creator, John Ney Rieber. The four issue mini-series was published at the end of 1999, and established a new status quo – and deep connection with Faerie – for the character that Vertigo planned to explore in an ongoing The Books of Faerie monthly series with Molly as the central character. The series would be written by Bronwyn Carlton, with Linda Medley inking her own pencils. Bronwyn Carlton also wrote four The Books of Faerie back-up strips, which were published in the regular The Books of Magic ongoing series in issues #57–59 and 62, to re-introduce the characters and concepts that she intended to use in the planned ongoing series.

The new series was intended to focus on Molly, Sturm the Troll and the Gyvv to tell stories of modern-day Faerie, but Vertigo reconsidered and decided to cut back the release from an ongoing monthly to a five issue mini-series instead. The Books of Faerie: Serpent's Tooth would have shown Molly undertaking "a quest to save the faerie realm from ultimate destruction" and discovering the true nature of her role as protector of Faerie, with one of the back up strip stories suggesting that the intention was to make Molly a future Queen of Faerie. The mini-series was initially planned for release in June 2000, before being canceled and indefinitely shelved.

== Storylines ==
=== The Books of Faerie ===
The first volume of The Books of Faerie details the fall of the Regent King Obrey and the journey to power of the ruler known as Titania. The story tells about human girl named Maryrose, dressed in rags, in "England, a long time ago". A cart full of bodies is visible in the background. Her "Gran" sends her for kindling, warning her not to follow the fairy lights, which of course she does. The lights turn into the childlike attendants of Queen Dymphna of Faerie, who she is brought to, who takes her in. Renamed Rosebud, she grows into young maidenhood in Faerie, a favorite of the Queen and apparently taken for a fairy by most. When King Obrey returns after many years away at war, the manipulator Amadan convinces him that he can at last sire true a fairy heir by Rosebud (fairies usually having a very hard time bearing children). He conspires with him to imprison Dymphna in an oak, whereupon he takes the girl as his very young bride. The Amadan, keeper of everyone's secrets, advises her to take the coronation name Titania.

As it turns out, Obrey is only the regent of Faerie, and dies in battle with his nephew, the true heir, Auberon: in returning to take the throne, he also takes Titania as his wife to reunite the two sides of the war, unaware of her origin. He is not unkind to her, and indeed gives her time to get used to him – a little too much time, as Titania travels back to the mundane world where she meets the falconer Tamlin and consummates an affair with him just as Auberon tells her it is time to produce an heir.

As The Amadan promised, Titania becomes pregnant, to the joy of all Faerie – especially Auberon, who immediately sends for his old brownie nanny Bridie to care for Titania and aid the birth. Titania goes into labor early, while the king is away, and though the baby boy lives, he is as pink as only a true human child would be. Bridie takes the child away to hide him, leaving Auberon wracked with guilt that his choice of nursemaid might have killed his son. It later becomes apparent that Titania believes the Opener Timothy Hunter to be the child that Bridie hid, although Tim is told by Auberon that he is not. Auberon said Timothy Hunter did not have "a drop of faerie blood in him", which, if he was the son of Tamlin and Titania, and if Titania was a human who had gone to Faerie, would be exactly right.

=== The Books of Faerie: Auberon's Tale ===
The second volume of The Books of Faerie jumps further back in time, showing the end of the reign of King Magnus and the rise of Auberon and his regent Obrey. King Magnus has become obsessed with the superiority of purebred faeries, and oppresses the other races of Faerie such as the flitlings and the brownies. He also organises games, where the other races fight to the death for the amusement of the Court, with the "contestants" being selected by the Amadan. The best fighter they have is a loyal troll called Sturm, who the King decides he will fight to show how superior the faeries are: Sturm is too loyal to fight back, but is confused and goaded into striking back and killing the King by a disembodied voice (hinted at belonging to the Amadan).

Sturm flees, leaving the Court facing the prospect of another war as Magnus died without heirs. As the two main candidates vie for support, Lord Obrey is approached by the Amadan who tells him of another solution: there is a distant member of Magnus' family still living on the borders of Faerie who holds the direct line of succession and could unite the two opposing sides. Obrey rushes to collect the boy-king Auberon before his opponents learn of him and have him killed, finding him being raised by his cousin, a faerie called Dymphna who Obrey once loved and lost, and a brownie called Bridie. The four return to the Court, and with Obrey's wise and steady guidance Auberon is crowned King and defeats his opponents on the field of battle.

Obrey is widely seen in the Court as positioning himself as the power behind the throne, something not helped when he marries Dymphna after the two rekindle their old love: Dymphna is also Auberon's cousin, and if the young king was to die Obrey would enjoy a strong claim on the throne. Obrey, however, is truly loyal to the king, until the Amadan tricks Auberon into publicly slighting Lord Obrey, driving a wedge between them and leading Obrey to think that he might as well take power for himself. Before he can do anything drastic, Auberon runs away from the Court to try to find his missing sister, proclaiming Obrey's right to rule as Regent until his return. One of the later back-up stories suggested that Auberon also left because he was aware of the danger he was in, and struck up a romantic relationship with an Elf Lord's daughter whilst searching for his sister.

=== The Books of Faerie: Molly's Story ===
The third The Books of Faerie story jumped forward from the previous volumes, telling a story in the modern era and reintroducing the character of Molly O'Reilly, cursed by Queen Titania and so unable to eat human food and left floating an inch above the ground. This brings her to the attention of the local media, and she is proclaimed a living saint by the Church, something which only adds to her black mood. As she tries to escape, she passes a toy shop which is selling a new range of fairy toys, one of which she recognises as the flitling Yarrow and releases. Yarrow tell Molly that she was accompanying King Auberon to the edge of Faerie to find the gemstone Twilight in the hope of undoing the wrong his wife did to Molly when they were attacked, and she ended up in the toystore. Reluctantly, Molly agrees to go to Faerie to help free Auberon, taking her cat Fithy with her.

Along the way, they meet another faerie called Briar Rose who offers to help them, but abandons Yarrow when she is captured by a demon. When Molly is accidentally transformed into a flitling, she discovers that Rose intends to kill her, Auberon and Titania once they are all found: fortunately, Molly escapes when Filthy magically grows wings and carries her away. Molly manages to free Yarrow from the demon, discovering that it learnt its power from the demon Barbatos.

They discover Queen Titania captured by Barbatos, who has a new "master", which is a giant green frog-like creature that the demon is forcing the faeries to build a lake for. A disguised Auberon is one of the workforce, and he and Titania are singled out by Rose for execution: she is in fact a flitling grown to human size as punishment for leading her kind in a rebellion, something which she intends to do again once she has had her revenge. Molly foils her plans by convincing Barbatos' master to relinquish Twilight, which has transformed him from a common frog, leaving the demon powerless. He is returned to his imprisonment in the Dreaming, and the faeries freed. All that remains is for Twilight to choose a new master so that it can protect Faerie for all time: the stone chooses Molly, curing her numerous enchantments and returning her home to resume her normal life again, until Faerie has need of her.

=== Back up strips ===
The first back-up strip story reintroduced the troll Sturm, telling a tale set in his youth of how he met a beautiful lady and returned her "silver treasure" – actually a snake that had caused the death of his two older brothers – to her. In return for his kindness, Sturm has his two brothers returned to him, and is gifted a wristlet that lets him walk under water without harm. The second told a tale of young Auberon being attacked by monsters in the night, but saved by a creature called the Gyvv that he has befriended that Bridie his nursemaid eventually identifies as a mythical creature called a Fotch. The third tale told of a young girl called Bryony who is seduced by a Kelpie, a male sea-dwelling creature that seduces young girls and drowns them once it has grown bored of them. She distrusts the creature, but eventually believes its protestations that this time is different and ends up dead on the beach within days.

The final tale showed the Gyvv and an unnamed woman discussing the history of Faerie once its time had ended, "setting the stage for the new ongoing series". The history ran from Faerie's first ruler Huon the Small, to mad Magnus and his rejection of his illegitimate son the Amadan, to the modern day of Faerie. The history revealed some snippets of information about Molly, suggesting that she became a queen of Faerie after marrying the unnamed woman's son, and worked with the Gyvv and Sturm to defeat numerous threats to Faerie, such as the woman with the "silver treasure" and the Wild Hunt. The tale closed with the woman and the Gyvv resolving to "cast the spell that will spin out the realm of Faerie once again", suggesting that the events seen in the history might belong in an alternate, previous version of the realm.

== Collected editions ==
Two collected editions of The Books of Faerie have been published, collecting the first two mini-series. Each includes one of the annuals from The Books of Magic, meaning that the annuals' author John Ney Rieber is co-credited as writer on the collected editions. The second collection also includes the first two of the back-up stories from the ongoing series The Books of Magic, which sometimes causes people to assume that the entirety of those issues of the ongoing series are reprinted in the collection.

The collections were:

1. The Books of Faerie
  1. The Books of Faerie by Bronwyn Carlton
  2. Arcana: The Books of Magic Annual #1 by John Ney Rieber
2. The Books of Faerie: Auberon's Tale
  1. The Books of Faerie: Auberon's Tale by Bronwyn Carlton
  2. The Books of Magic Annual #1 by John Ney Rieber
  3. Sturm and the Silver Treasure by Bronwyn Carlton
  4. Auberon Finds a Friend by Bronwyn Carlton

The remaining issues are uncollected.

== See also ==
- List of The Books of Magic characters
