= Titania (DC Comics) =

- Titania, shown in childhood through to her disguised appearance as a pure-born faerie, from The Books of Faerie.

Publication information
- Publisher: DC Comics
- First appearance: The Sandman (vol. 2) #19 (September 1990)
- Created by: Neil Gaiman (writer); Charles Vess (artist)

In-story information
- Species: Fae
- Place of origin: Earth
- Team affiliations: Seelie Court
- Notable aliases: Maryrose, Queen Mab
- Abilities: Vast magical abilities

Titania is a fictional character, a comic book faerie published by DC Comics. She first appeared in The Sandman (vol. 2) #19 (September 1990), and was created by Neil Gaiman and Charles Vess. She is inspired by and implied to be the same Titania as the faerie queen in William Shakespeare's play A Midsummer Night's Dream.

== Publication history ==
As part of his comic The Sandman, writer Neil Gaiman planned a small arc involving William Shakespeare entering a deal with the Dream King to write plays that would live on after him. Having introduced Shakespeare, Gaiman then decided to tell the story of the first play that the writer wrote for Dream in payment of the bargain. He turned to his favourite of Shakespeare's plays, A Midsummer Night's Dream creating analogs of the play's main otherworldly characters and inventing the fiction that Shakespeare wrote the play to Dream's instructions to ensure that humans never forgot Faerie and its rulers, Lord Auberon and Lady Titania. Having created her, Gaiman used Titania as a recurring character throughout the series, and when he was asked part way through his run on The Sandman to write a script to introduce DC's magical characters to a new audience, he gave her a guest role in the resultant mini-series, The Books of Magic.

One ambiguous scene written by Gaiman was interpreted by some to suggest that Titania was the mother of protagonist Timothy Hunter, which ensured that the character would return when the mini-series became an ongoing series. Chosen as Gaiman's replacement, John Ney Rieber discovered that a gaming guide to the DC universe had made this assumption, and worried that a key part of the Tim Hunter character - that he was a normal teenage boy - might be lost if this was true. Instead of simply denying the possibility of Titania being Tim's mother Rieber decided to use the idea as one of his ongoing storylines, while gently debunking it. This meant utilizing Titania and her husband Auberon as supporting characters for most of his run on the comic, which in turn meant frequent visits and explorations to Faerie. Such was the importance of Titania to Rieber's version of The Books of Magic that when its popularity caused DC to release a spin-off miniseries, they decided that a three-issue miniseries about her rise to power would be most suitable - one that reignited the possibility of her being Tim's mother.

The character later returned for brief appearances in Dylan Horrocks' Hunter: The Age of Magic and Si Spencer's Books of Magick: Life During Wartime, before author Mike Carey brought her back in the graphic novel God Save the Queen. The graphic novel also introduced the character of Queen Mab, a name which The Sandman had established that Titania sometimes used as an alias.

=== Appearance ===
In her first appearance, Titania was depicted as a regal woman who looked almost entirely human save for pointed ears. While her physical appearance remained consistent regardless of the artist depicting her during her time in The Sandman, her skin color varied from green back to normal human tones and then back to a consistent green whenever she appeared in The Books of Magic. The Books of Faerie established that Titania's true appearance was constantly hidden by a magical glamour, which may explain her changing skin tone.

== Fictional character biography ==
Titania was born a normal human girl called Maryrose living in poverty with her grandmother during the 11th century. When she was collecting wood in a nearby forest, she was tempted by a group of Flitlings to return with them to Faerie. Once there, she became a favorite of Queen Dymphna, earning the nickname Rosebud to protect her true name: she also caught the eye of King Obrey, who - spurred on by his jester, the manipulative Amadan - magically transformed his wife into a tree and took Maryrose as his second wife. Maryrose took a gemstone glamour from Dymphna and used it to appear a pure-blood faerie at her coronation, taking the name Queen Titania.

Titania seemed truly flattered by the love and attention of the king, but this was short-lived: Obrey was killed in battle by the rightful King of Faerie, Lord Auberon. Seeking to reunite the warring factions, Auberon took Titania as his wife when he reclaimed the throne, and urged her to quickly set about the work of producing an heir to make the union secure. Titania felt slighted by the loss of a loving husband and his replacement with one whose only interest in her appeared to be political, and soon began the first of many affairs with the human falconer Tamlin. Titania's infidelity later became notorious - even one of her lesser subjects was able to comment on how fitting it was that Auberon wore horns - and she is rumoured to have had an affair with Dream of the Endless (called "Lord Shaper" by the faeries) and was seen casually bedding her female servant Selwyn - unaware that the maid was Auberon in disguise. Perhaps because of her infidelity, Titania was quick to assume that Auberon was equally unfaithful, although no evidence of this was ever shown, and conversely Auberon was shown to maintain strong affection for his wife even in the face of her reputation, even regularly disguising himself as a maid to be with his queen without enduring her scorn.

Titania was shown to be a jealous lover, demanding unconditional adoration from her lovers even though she rarely returned the feelings herself: her affair with Tamlin ended when he realised what she was truly like and she was noticeably annoyed when Dream sent no secret message for her with a servant who returned to Faerie from his realm. She, however, has also shown genuine affection and emotion, even if she tries to hide it: when her affair with Tamlin leaves her with a human son, she is devastated to have to send him to Earth to keep the secret of her nature and her affair from the King and risks sending her realm to war against Hell to protect her son with Auberon from being kept in Hell as payment of Faerie's tithe to the demons.

Titania was acutely aware of her status as queen, and the respect and attention she felt she was due because of it. She nearly destroyed her entire realm by cursing Molly O'Reilly to turn into the "Burning Girl" for no other reason than her attendants' fascination with the girl's efforts to grow real vegetables, and frequently grew enraged at Timothy Hunter's casual disregard for the possibility that she might be his mother. Rarely, she can show something like humility, for example apologising to Molly for the trouble she caused the girl and acknowledging that she had done wrong. Despite her faults, Titania was a strong and able queen, whether riding out to face down the forces of Hell at the head of her army or subtly politicking to ensure that Faerie's best interests were met in the wider worlds.

== See also ==
- Titania (Fairy Queen)
