= Hermann Mejía =

Venezuelan–American painter and sculptor (born 1973)

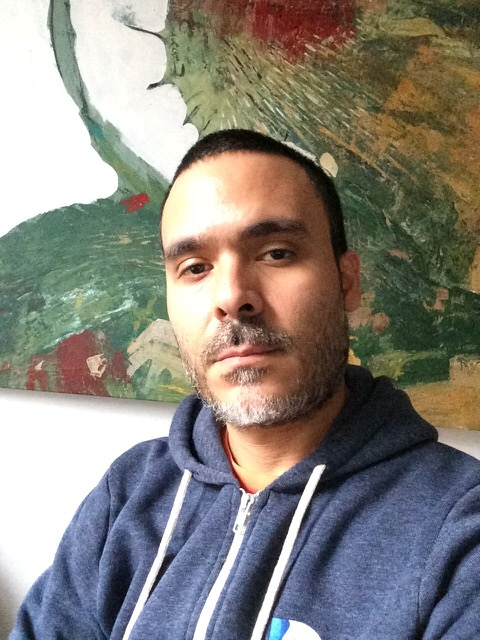
- Born: April 25, 1973 (age 53) Caracas, Venezuela
- Area: Artist

Hermann Mejía (born 1973) is a Venezuelan–American painter and sculptor known for his work for Mad magazine. He was named by HuffPost as "one of 15 famous Venezuelan artists to know".

== Early life ==
Hermann Mejía started drawing at a young age. He started collecting comics at age 13 and received his first artist's commission at 15, painting promotional graffiti for musical acts in Caracas. He studied illustration and painting at the Caracas Design Institute. After graduating, he started his career in fine arts with numerous exhibitions in his native Venezuela, both collective and solo. Growing recognition as a vanguard artist landed him a commission to design a series of Venezuelan postage stamps commemorating Pope John Paul II in 1996.

== Career ==
Mejía is a prolific artist with a long career of solo and collective exhibitions of both paintings and sculptures, mostly in South America but also in the U.S. His style and technique have been linked to many influences including Francis Bacon, Lucian Freud, the surrealists, and street art. In addition to his artistic career, he has successfully ventured into comic art and commercial art.

Upon having won the first prize in a sequential art contest, Mejia was awarded a trip to New York City, where he met artist George Pratt, who had been one of the judges of the contest. Pratt took Mejía to the offices of DC Comics, where Mejía was offered a job almost instantly. Through DC, Mejía met Charlie Kochman, publishing editor for DC, which included the satirical humor magazine Mad. Mejía received his first assignment for the April 1997 issue.

Woman's Head – 2012 – Acrylic on canvas 33" x 38"

Mejía worked for the New York-based Mad magazine while still living in Venezuela during the next two years. In 1999, Mejía moved to the United States. He received a "Best in Magazine Feature" Reuben Award from the National Cartoonists Society in 2003.

Mejia works in his studio in Gowanus, Brooklyn, New York.

== Selected exhibits ==
- 1995 Buen Provecho. La Paninoteka. Caracas, Venezuela
- 1996 Ángeles. Ateneo de el Hatillo. Caracas, Venezuela
- 1998 Venarte. Torre Consolidado. Caracas, Venezuela
- 2002 That Smell of Beauty. Consulate of Venezuela. New York City
- 2002 Design. Consulate of Venezuela. New York City
- 2003 Amazonas, Consulate of Venezuela. New York City
- 2003 L Factor. Exit Art. New York, NY-USA
- 2003 Latin-Art Digital Diaspora. Studio Soto. Boston, USA
- 2004 Clear and Present Danger. Galou Gallery. Brooklyn, USA
- 2004 Spanglish. Solar Gallery. East Hampton, USA
- 2005 Comic Reality. Katzen Arts Center at American University, Washington DC, USA
- 2008 Art Auction – Step by Step. Durba Segnini Gallery. Miami, USA
- 2010 Solo show. Rocketship, Brooklyn, USA
- 2012 Winter Salon Exhibition. Brooklyn Artist Gym. Brooklyn, USA
- 2012 Studio La Perla – Collective Show (20 years after). Excideuil Castle. Dordgne, France
- 2012 All Together Now: A Tribute To The Beatles. Nucleus Gallery. Los Angeles, USA
- 2013 In TRansition, Ambush Gallery. Sydney, Australia
- 2013 Summer Salon, Trestle Gallery. Brooklyn, USA
- 2014 Contemporary Landscapes and Other Fantasies, The Modern Barn, East Hampton, USA
- 2014 Eyesight is Insight, One Art Space Gallery. New York City
- 2014 Fonzo Miami, Curator's Voice Art Proyect. Miami, USA
- 2015 Small Works, Trestle Gallery. Brooklyn, USA
- 2016 Recent Works, Museo de Arte Contemporaneo de Caracas
- 2016 (In) Between, Filser & Gräf Gallery. Munich, Germany
- 2017 WITHIN, Gallery Elena Shchuckina, Mayfair, London, UK

== Selected art works ==
- "Transmutación" – 1988 – acrylic on illustration board 11" x 18"
- "Bala-Huevo" – 1989 – acrylic on illustration board 20" x 14"
- "Polen" – 1994 – acrylic on illustration board 20" x 14"
- "Fruta, Mono y Sombras" – 1998 etching – print on paper 15" x 14"
- "Mono 2" – 2001 – acrylic on paper 53" x 68"
- "El Chigüire" – 2001 – acrylic on canvas 50" x 57"
- "Amazonas" – 2003 – acrylic on canvas 28" x 40"
- "The Rubber Man" (collaboration with Lucia Pizzani) – 2003 (installation) Dragon Skin silicone rubber, c-prints and rubber bands 69" x 16" x 0.8"
- "Las FAN" – 2004 – acrylic on canvas 60" x 40"
- "Amazonas Loop" – 2004 – Video (1 minute)
- "Madera" – 2009 – acrylic on canvas 35" x 45"
- "Deer Hunt" – 2012 – acrylic on canvas 56" x 118"
- "Yellow" – 2012 – watercolor / acrylic on paper 23" x 36"
- "Hunter" – 2012 – acrylic on canvas 83" x 60"
- "Woman's Head" – 2012 – acrylic on canvas 33" x 38"
- "Frontier" – 2012 – acrylic on canvas 38" x 33"
- "Garden" – 2012 – acrylic on canvas 42" x 40"
- "Waiting Room" – 2012 – acrylic on canvas 36" x 36"
- "Suit 1" – 2012 – watercolor on paper 30" x 22"
- "Suit 2" – 2012 – watercolor on paper 22" x 30"
- "Cicada" – 2012 – watercolor / silkscreen on paper 12" x 16"
- "Entangled" – 2013 – Acrylic on canvas, 48" x 72"

== Selected commercial works ==
- The Books of Magic Annual No. 1, cover only (1997, DC Comics)
- The Books of Faerie #1–3, covers only (Mar–May 1997, DC Comics)
- The Books of Magic No. 58, "Auberon Finds a Friend" (March 1998, DC Comics)
- The Books of Faerie: Auberon's Tale #1–3, covers only (Aug–Oct 1998, DC Comics)
- The Books of Faerie: Molly's Story #1–3 (Sept–Nov 1999, DC Comics)
- Lobo: Fragtastic Voyage
- Mad: Preview of the Walking-Dead-Satire
