= The Children's Crusade (comics) =

DC comic book series

- Cover of Children's Crusade #1 (December 1993), art by John Totleben.
- Publisher: Vertigo Comics (imprint of DC Comics)
- Publication date: 1993–1994
- Genre: Horror, superhero; Crossover
Title(s)
Animal Man Annual #1
Arcana Annual #1
Black Orchid Annual #1
Children's Crusade #1-2
Doom Patrol Annual #2
Swamp Thing Annual #7

"The Children's Crusade" is the overarching title of a seven-issue comic book crossover and limited series, and specifically the two bookends thereof. It was published in 1993 and 1994 by DC Comics as a part of the Vertigo imprint.

The two bookends which open and close the crossover were written by Neil Gaiman and Alisa Kwitney, with the middle five issues being the newly created or resurrected Annuals from the then-on-going Vertigo titles (bar the Arcana Annual, which re-launched a new Books of Magic series). These were written by those titles' then-authors: Dick Foreman, Jamie Delano, Nancy Collins, Rachel Pollack and John Ney Rieber, respectively.

This storyline marked the first attempt by the then-brand-new Vertigo comic line to do a crossover within its titles. Its relative lack of success, and the subsequent retooling of the Vertigo imprint to feature comics that do not tend to share a universe, make it unlikely to be repeated in such a manner. Subsequently, therefore, while individual characters (in particular John Constantine) occasionally guest-star in other titles, such a wide-ranging crossover has not been attempted.

== Titles ==
In addition to the two Children's Crusade issues, the crossover ran through five newly created/resurrected Annuals. In reading order the event runs as follows: Children's Crusade #1, Black Orchid Annual #1, Animal Man Annual #1, Swamp Thing Annual #7, Doom Patrol Annual #2, Arcana Annual #1, and Children's Crusade #2.

== Collected edition ==
In 2015, Vertigo published the entire title in one collected edition Free Country: A Tale of the Children's Crusade, which includes the two issue miniseries, as well as a "brand-new middle chapter" written by Dead Boy Detectives writer Toby Litt and drawn by artist Peter Gross in place of the annuals of the original crossover.

=== Characters ===
Alongside Edwin Paine and Charles Rowland, the "Dead Boy Detectives", it focused on the children who played major roles in these books: Suzy, Maxine Baker, Tefé, Dorothy Spinner and Timothy Hunter respectively.

== Advertising ==
The crossover was advertised in the trade press, amongst them the fledgling Hero Illustrated. The advert featured a specially written five-panel strip in which Charles Rowland and Edwin Paine read the Vertigo press release advertising the "big crossover in October and November [1993] in some of the Vertigo Annuals".

The crossover's tagline was "The Children's Crusade, it's no Fairy Tale" and the author of the comic-strip-advert (likely Neil Gaiman, about whom it says "whoever he is") writes archly, through the character of Charles Rowland:

"It says here that the Vertigo Universe will never be the same again.
Of course, it was never the same before".

== Plot summaries ==
The story starts with the ghosts of two boys, Edwin and Charles (seen previously in issue #25 of The Sandman and later in The Dead Boy Detectives), who have set up shop as detectives for hire, with nothing but the knowledge of the great mystery novels and films. The two boys are approached by a young girl that finds their ad and enlists them to locate her brother who, along with several other children, disappeared from the small English hamlet they all live in, called Flaxdown.

It turns out that all the children of the village as well as all other children who have ever disappeared (in "The Children's Crusade" & "The Pied Piper of Hamelin") were taken to a place called "Free Country". Free Country is a place where children never grow old and are free from the abuse and tyranny of adults (child abuse is a recurring theme). Free Country is run by a council of various children who have existed there hundreds of years. The council is attempting to bring over all the children in the world, but Free Country is having trouble supporting them all. To help bolster Free Country's power they bring over five innately powerful children. As long as the children stay in Free Country they provide the place with power.

The comics include many references to the works of Robert Browning.

=== Arcana: The Books of Magic ===
Written by John Ney Rieber and with art by Peter Gross, the Arcana Annual reintroduced Timothy Hunter from Neil Gaiman's The Books of Magic miniseries. The story concentrated mostly on a young dancer called Marya, who leaves behind Free Country and an overly attentive admirer named Daniel to recruit Timothy Hunter to their cause. Tim is destined to be the greatest magician of his age, and his support would greatly strengthen Free Country, but before she can find him, the young magician is kidnapped "respectfully" by a falconer named Tamlin.

Tamlin is apparently working on behalf of an unnamed Queen implied to be Titania, but when he takes Tim to a dying corner of Faerie he admits that he has his own agenda: Faerie is dying, and the falconer thinks that Tim may be able to save it. He gives Tim a gift of a magical stone, and leaves him to find his own way back to the real world. When he does, Tim meets with Marya and agrees to go to Free Country to see if he can help there. Marya doesn't return with him, deciding to stay in the real world and fulfil her dream of becoming a dancer.

The Arcana Annual also acted as a prelude to a monthly The Books of Magic comic, which continued the stories of Tim and Tamlin, and Marya and Daniel.

Arcana: The Books of Magic Annual #1 was included in the collected edition of The Books of Faerie.

== Prose adaptation ==
In 2003, a prose adaptation of the crossover was released as part of the Books of Magic prose novels series. The Books of Magic: The Children's Crusade was written by Carla Jablonski.
