= Molly O'Reilly (character) =

- Portion of a panel from The Books of Magic: Reckonings, showing Molly in an embrace with Tim Hunter.

Publication information
- Publisher: DC Comics/Vertigo
- First appearance: The Books of Magic #5: "The Hidden School" (DC Vertigo, 1997)
- Created by: John Ney Rieber; Peter Gross

In-story information
- Abilities: Initially none, but ultimately gains a magical gem that makes her the protector of Faerie.

Molly O'Reilly is a fictional character created for the Vertigo comic-book series The Books of Magic by writer John Ney Rieber and artist Peter Gross. Although she was written out of the main series, she was brought back by popular demand in a limited series called The Books of Faerie: Molly's Story (which was to have led to her own series). This series was never produced, and Molly returned as a regular character partway through the short-lived Hunter: The Age of Magic series.

== Background ==
=== The Books of Magic ===
To capitalise on the success of The Books of Magic miniseries by Neil Gaiman, Vertigo turned the series into a monthly comic which would continue the story of teenaged magician Tim Hunter. Vertigo chose John Ney Rieber as writer for the series, which debuted with Arcana: The Books of Magic Annual #1 (part of the crossover series The Children's Crusade). Rieber expanded the character of Tim, using his own memories of teenage life to create a realistic picture of a young boy struggling to decide who he is going to be. As counterpoint to Tim's uncertainty Rieber created Molly O'Reilly (a young girl "who'd already figured out the best thing you could possibly do with your life was live it") to allow the series to explore the magical world and Tim's real life.

As the series progressed, Molly proved popular with readers. Rieber (who sometimes found the central character too close to his teenaged self for comfort) created Molly partly as wish-fulfillment: "Yes this is the perfect girlfriend, if you could have had a girlfriend like Molly at 13 oh my God". His artist for the series, Peter Gross, admitted that this sometimes caused Molly to eclipse Tim as the more-interesting character. This may have been particularly true during the extended Rites of Passage storyline which became Molly's swan song, with its focus on her enforced stay in Faerie ensuring that Tim was absent for entire issues of the comic.

When Rieber decided to leave The Books of Magic, he initially asked that the character of Molly be discontinued; he planned to write a story focused more on Molly, detailing how she lost her virginity before she met Tim and the effect that experience had on her. Although this request was later withdrawn, his replacement had already plotted a 25-issue run without her and decided not to include her (except for a one-issue story to give her closure with Tim). Despite this, such was the character's popularity that "almost everyone" writing to the comic's producers asked if (and when) she would return.

=== The Books of Faerie ===
In 1999, Vertigo announced that Molly would be returning in two projects. The first would be a third volume of The Books of Faerie called Molly's Story, written by the character's creator John Ney Rieber. The four issue mini-series was published at the end of 1999, and established a new status quo (and connection with Faerie) for the character; Vertigo planned to explore this in The Books of Faerie monthly series, with Molly as the central character. The series would be written by Bronwyn Carlton, who wrote two "well received" (according to editor Stuart Moore) The Books of Faerie collections, with Linda Medley inking her own pencils.

The new series was intended to focus on Molly, Sturm the Troll and the Gyvv (the last two characters introduced in previous The Books of Faerie comics) to tell stories of modern-day Faerie. Vertigo, however, reconsidered and decided to reduce the release from a monthly comic to a five-issue mini-series instead. The Books of Faerie: Serpent's Tooth would have shown Molly undertaking "a quest to save the faerie realm from ultimate destruction" (discovering the true nature of her role as protector of Faerie), with a preview of the series published in The Books of Magic suggesting that the intention was to make Molly a future Queen of Faerie. The mini-series was planned for release in June 2000, before being indefinitely shelved.

=== Final appearances ===
Molly eventually returned in Dylan Horrocks' Hunter: The Age of Magic, initially making brief guest appearances before becoming a supporting character shortly before the series was cancelled by Vertigo after 25 issues. An alternate version of the character appeared in Books of Magick: Life During Wartime, written by Si Spencer and co-plotted by Neil Gaiman.

== Character history ==
Molly grew up as the only daughter of a large Irish family on a farm in Crossmaglen, constantly having to assert herself against her brothers. She learned detailed, practical knowledge about magic and fairies from her "mad" paternal grandmother (who had second sight). For example, Molly knew her friend Marya would be able to ride a unicorn to escape an attack from Daniel because she was still a virgin (with her decision not to ride it herself implying that she was not); she also demonstrated knowledge of the danger of accepting gifts or eating Faerie food when she was trapped in the realm. This knowledge was not the only thing she inherited from her grandmother: Molly takes medication to prevent the auditory and visual hallucinations which run in her family. These are a version of her grandmother's "sight" when she is trapped in Faerie without her medicine.

When Molly's father moved the family to London they moved into the Ravensknoll estate, next to Tim Hunter and his parents. She developed a crush on Tim, pestering him at school and eventually claiming him as her boyfriend after helping him accept his father's disfigurement in a fire (although she did not tell Tim, who only found out when their mutual friend Marya announced that Molly's boyfriend was a magician). Tim also had feelings for Molly, and the two began a relationship.

Molly is level-headed and tough, standing up to assailants like Daniel (and Tim, when he needs her no-nonsense advice) as she stood up to her brothers. She has deep feelings for Tim; their first kiss transforms a corner of hell into a blossoming field and some mistake her for Tim's Other because of her importance to him, but when she discovers Tim might become abusive she carefully considers her options. When Tim heard her discussing those options with Marya, he ran away from home to protect his loved ones from further harm. Molly was shipped back to her grandmother's farm, and resolved that she owed it to Tim to discuss the situation honestly with him; this meant finding him.

With her grandmother's help Molly attracted the attention of the Amadan, hoping to win the fairy gift of her heart's desire: to see Tim. The conversation took an unexpected turn, however, and Molly accidentally challenged the Faerie to a contest to see which was the greatest fool. With the contest due to take place in Faerie, Molly is transported from the real world and left to fend for herself until it can be arranged. She knows that if she eats Faerie food, she will never be able to return home; touching the ground would wither her and eating real food would starve her, so she would be forced to stay in Faerie. Instead, she attempts to grow her own real food; her efforts attract the Faeries' attention, and her stubbornness the ire of Titania. The Queen tricks Molly into eating Faerie food by making her crops grow overnight. The trick backfires, though, as Molly's anger transforms her into "the burning girl", who cuts a swath of destruction across Faerie.

She finds a friend in a horse named Prince, who reveals himself to be Titania and Auberon's son Taik. He is enchanted by Molly and proposes to her, but is also possessed by a demon and attempts to kill her. The Queen's loyal fairy Yarrow helps Molly defeat Taik, and Tim and Molly are reunited. Titania tempers her curse as best she can; Molly's feet will not touch the ground and she will have Faerie food to eat, so she can return to the mundane world with Tim. Molly tells him about her adventures in Faerie, but Tim is more interested in learning magic from his new mentor Zatanna. He fails to notice that her feet no longer touch the ground, and when she discovers that Tim slept with the succubus Leah while Molly was trapped in Faerie her pragmatic nature comes to the fore. Although it breaks her heart, she breaks up with Tim and returns home to her family.

For a long time, Molly does not see Tim again; when she thinks she gave him a last chance to talk things through she was really talking to his Other, who convinced her that he was a lost cause. She remains with her family in London and tries to deal with her newfound celebrity; since her feet no longer touch the ground, she has been declared a saint. She finds life a struggle; unable to eat her normal comfort food, she gets over Tim as best she can. When passing a toy shop, Molly finds that Yarrow has been enchanted and sold as a toy; in rescuing her, she travels back to Faerie. The demon Barbatos is capturing the residents of Faerie and transforming them into a new range of toys; in defeating him, Molly is claimed by the magical gemstone Twilight as the new Protector of the Summerland (an "ancient obligation, to be worn by a person of honour, wisdom, dignity, wonder and courage"). She returns to earth with Titania's curse lifted; now ignored by the media, she appears to be a normal human girl again.

Molly leaves London, attends art school in Paris and finds a new boyfriend. Returning to London after graduation, she sees Tim again (denying that any of the strange things which had happened in her life were true). She is forced to admit the truth when she is sucked through a painting into an alternate world with Tim; although the two reconcile their differences, they do not resume their relationship.
