= Mister E =

DC Comics character

Publication information
- Publisher: DC Comics
- First appearance: Secrets of Haunted House #31 (December 1980)
- Created by: Bob Rozakis; Jack C. Harris

In-story information
- Alter ego: Erik
- Team affiliations: The Trenchcoat Brigade
- Abilities: Time manipulation

Mister E is a fictional character appearing in magazines published by DC Comics. Created by Bob Rozakis and Jack C. Harris, the character first appeared in Secrets of Haunted House #31 (December 1980) and was a recurring character for ten issues. He was then radically redesigned by Neil Gaiman for use in The Books of Magic, after which he appeared in his own mini-series and was a recurring character in Vertigo Comics titles owned by DC.

== Fictional character biography ==
As a young boy Erik was repeatedly beaten by his father. Erik tried to protect his sister Katarina from his father, but failed. One day Erik found degrading and perverted pictures of his mother and his sister hidden under his father's bed. His father found out that Erik knew his secrets, so he took out Erik's eyes with a sharpened spoon. His father believed humanity was inherently evil, and thought that by blinding his son he was saving him from temptation. These childhood experiences made Erik psychotic and a dangerous fanatic. He still had a deep love for his father, so he blocked out the reason his father maimed him, making up a fiction in his mind that his father did it because he caught Erik sneaking a peek at an adult magazine.

Erik moved to Boston and under the name Mister E he achieved some fame as both a historian and a vigilante who sought out and destroyed what he perceived to be evil. His forte was the supernatural, and he battled many magical beings over the years. At one point, he met "the Superman". He hired a young woman recently emigrated from Dublin named Kelly O'Toole to be his assistant after she helped him defeat her former employer, Judge Kobold, who was both a werewolf and a vampire who had sentenced numerous alleged witches to hang. Erik fought with false zombies, creatures built from corpses by mad scientists, and a leprechaun who had allowed Kelly's mother the financial opportunity to visit her in Boston. He assisted a young man, David Neu (Neu is Rozakis's wife's surname), who was researching manuscripts by Cotton Mather, to kill a hound that allegedly belonged to Salem witches, and also hired him on as an assistant. He guided the two into hanging another hound out the window. The three also fought a descendant of Mathew Maule who claimed to be Maule himself.

Mister E joined Doctor Occult, John Constantine and the Phantom Stranger to teach young Tim Hunter about magic. Tim was destined to become a powerful sorcerer, but Mister E believed that he would one day pose a threat to humanity. Mister E journeyed into the future with Tim, showing him a timeline in which Tim led the forces of evil against the world. Mister E then tried to kill Tim at the end of the universe, but was interrupted by Destiny and Death. Death sent Tim back to his own time, but did not help Mister E, so he had to go back in time one step at a time.

Mister E was determined to return and kill Tim, but he was sidetracked in time by the Temptress and the Shadower. These two mystic beings represented repressed parts of Mister E's own mind. In the end Mister E and the Shadower destroyed the Temptress.

On his walk back from the end of time E encountered Pyotr Konstantin, who tagged along with him back to the present day.

Mister E made the difficult decision to let Tim Hunter live in peace, thus breaking the cycle of abuse started by E's own father.

=== Attempt at normalcy ===
E attempted to live a normal life in New York City, going so far as to make friends and talk to women. He suffered from visions of a world eaten up by the Cancer God M'Nagalah, and knew that Pyotr Konstantin somehow caused it. In the dead of night E broke into the homes of Russian immigrants in an attempt to find Pyotr, and threatened them with his hammer and stakes. E's nighttime activities made the news, and John Constantine knew it had to be E, so he summoned the other members of the Trenchcoat Brigade to have a chat with him. E took the Trenchcoat Brigade on a trip to the possible future of his vision, where the only person left alive was Pyotr. E staked Pyotr through the chest, but it didn't kill him, and Pyotr summoned the Whining Ones to attack the Brigade. The Brigade won the fight and Pyotr told them they could avert the tragedy he caused if they took him back in time to the 17th century, so E complied. In the past Pyotr cast a spell to force the Brigade to confront and deal with each other's past failures and guilt while he set off to prevent his past self from setting off the chain of events that unleashed M'nagalah. The Brigade conquered each other's guilt and found Pyotr, who'd failed to stop his past self. E took the Brigade to the time of the Chernobyl nuclear disaster, when Pyotr's past self and Elliana of the Leshy, whose people had been destroyed by mankind, would bring M'nagalah to Earth. E took M'nagalah, who needed a mortal filled with guilt to allow him corporal existence on Earth, and allowed him into his body. E conquered his guilt and M'nagalah, preventing his vision of a cancer destroyed world from occurring.

Timothy Hunter would later magically try to contact Constantine, Stranger and Occult. His power sent the message to everyone, including E. He showed up with the others and tried to apologize to Tim for what had happened earlier.

=== The New 52 ===
In The New 52, E has cast an unknown spell that caused his eyes to bleed out. He appears as an enemy of Constantine. Constantine has described him as one of the most cruel and insane mages in the world. He speaks with a Southern accent and dresses in white.

== Character appearances ==
- Secrets of Haunted House #31 (December 1980): "The Twice-Cursed Man"
- Secrets of Haunted House #32 (January 1981): "Those Who Pass Judgment"
- Secrets of Haunted House #33 (February 1981): "Of Death and Life and Voodoo Drums"
- Secrets of Haunted House #34 (March 1981): "The Left Hand Never Knows"
- Secrets of Haunted House #35 (April 1981): "The Lair of Lady Frankenstein"
- Secrets of Haunted House #36 (May 1981): "Demon Spell"
- Secrets of Haunted House #37 (June 1981): "The Third Wish is Death"
- Secrets of Haunted House #38 (July 1981): "Conglomerate of Evil"
- Secrets of Haunted House #39 (August 1981): "The Witch-Hounds of Salem"
- Secrets of Haunted House #40 (September 1981): "The Were-Witch of Boston"
- Secrets of Haunted House #41 (October 1981): "The Blood-Curse of Maule's Well"
- The Books of Magic #1 (January 1991): "The Invisible Labyrinth"
- The Books of Magic #2 (February 1991): "The Shadow World"
- The Books of Magic #4 (April 1991): "The Road to Nowhere"
- Mister E #1 (June 1991): "At the End of Time"
- Mister E #2 (July 1991): "Master!"
- Mister E #3 (August 1991): "The Temptress"
- Mister E #4 (September 1991): "The Power"
- Doom Patrol (vol. 2) #53 (March 1992): "And Men Shall Call Him -- Hero!"
- Underworld Unleashed: The Abyss: Hell's Sentinel (December 1995)
- Arcana Annual #1 (January 1994): "Long Walks in Dancing Shoes"
- The Books of Magic (vol. 2) #6 (October 1994) 'Sacrifices, Part 1: Instruments'
- The Books of Magic (vol. 2) #51 (August 1998): "A Thousand Worlds of Tim"
- The Books of Magic (vol. 2) Annual #3 (1999): "A Thousand Deaths of Timothy Hunter"
- The Trenchcoat Brigade #1 (March 1999): "Mercy Killer"
- The Trenchcoat Brigade #2 (April 1999): "The Kindness of the Wolf"
- The Trenchcoat Brigade #3 (May 1999): "Eyes of the Blind"
- The Trenchcoat Brigade #4 (June 1999): "A Lingering Death"
- The Names of Magic #1 (February 2001): "Chapter One: Invocation"
- The Names of Magic #5 (June 2001): "Chapter Five: Truth"
- Constantine #2 (April 2013): "Dead In The Streets"
- Constantine #3 (May 2013): "Welcome Back to London, John..."
- Justice League Dark 2021 Annual #1 (December 2021)

== Powers and abilities ==
In spite of Mister E's originally unexplained blindness, his major power was the ability to "see" evil. He often carried weapons for fighting supernatural creatures (silver bullets, wooden stakes, crucifixes, etc.). Hints of his psychological disturbance were implied when he justified the executions of the Salem Witch Trials.

In the Books of Magic storyline Mister E was blinded as a child, when his deranged father gouged out his eyeballs for gazing at a woman of low moral character (his mother). He still has the mystical ability to see "what needs to be seen", but can now see the good and evil in the souls of others. He learned the ability to walk through time from his older self. Mister E also has dissociative identity disorder (formerly known as multiple personality disorder), swinging from a mild personality to a psychotic fundamentalist Christian.

In the New 52, E also has a staff that can tear a person's soul from their body.
