= The Trenchcoat Brigade =

Vertigo Comics comic book series

- The Trenchcoat Brigade #1, cover art by Glenn Fabry.

Publication information
- Publisher: Vertigo
- Schedule: Monthly
- Format: Limited series
- Publication date: March–June 1999
- No. of issues: 4

Creative team
- Written by: John Ney Rieber
- Artist: John Ridgway
- Letterer: Elle De Ville
- Colorist: Alex Sinclair
- Editor(s): Cliff Chiang; Stuart Moore

The Trenchcoat Brigade is a four-issue comic book limited series that was published in 1999 as a part of DC Comics' Vertigo imprint, featuring several mystic DC Universe characters.

The title references an offhand joke used by John Constantine in the earlier Books of Magic series to label a loose affiliation of mystics including himself, Phantom Stranger, Doctor Occult, and Mister E who share a preference for trenchcoats as their outdoor wear (Constantine was knowingly paraphrasing the title of Alfred, Lord Tennyson's famous "The Charge of the Light Brigade", about a reckless military event).

== Publication history ==
They first appeared together in Neil Gaiman's The Books of Magic series, in which they attempted to guide Tim Hunter through various realms of Magic in the DC Universe in order to teach him all of Magic's abilities and consequences.

The group would later re-unite in the five-issue miniseries The Names of Magic, before finally getting their own miniseries.

== Members ==
Character	Real name	First joined team	First appearance
John Constantine	John Constantine	The Books of Magic #1 (December 1990)	The Saga of the Swamp Thing #37 (June 1985)
Doctor Occult	Richard Occult	The Books of Magic #1 (December 1990)	New Fun Comics #6 (October 1935)
Mister E	Erik	The Books of Magic #1 (December 1990)	Secrets of Haunted House #31 (December 1980)
Phantom Stranger	various	The Books of Magic #1 (December 1990)	Phantom Stranger #1 (August–September 1952)
Rose Psychic	Rose Spiritus	The Books of Magic #3 (February 1991)	More Fun Comics #19 (March 1937)
