= The Books of Magic =

English-language comic book mini-series

- The Books of Magic #1 (Dec. 1990), cover art by John Bolton.

Publication information
- Publisher: DC Comics (Vertigo for volume 2 and the collected editions)
- Format: (vol. 1); Mini-series (vol. 2); Ongoing
- Publication date: (vol. 1); 1990–1991 (vol. 2); 1994–2000
- No. of issues: (vol. 1); 4 (vol. 2); 75
- Main character: Timothy Hunter

Creative team
- Created by: Neil Gaiman; John Bolton
- Written by: Neil Gaiman; John Ney Rieber; Peter Gross
- Artist(s): John Bolton; Scott Hampton; Charles Vess; Paul Johnson; Peter Gross; Jason Temujin Minor
- Letterer: Todd Klein

Collected editions
- The Books of Magic: ISBN 1-56389-082-8
- Bindings: ISBN 1-56389-187-5
- Summonings: ISBN 1-56389-265-0
- Reckonings: ISBN 1-56389-321-5
- Transformations: ISBN 1-56389-417-3
- Girl in the Box: ISBN 1-56389-539-0
- The Burning Girl: ISBN 1-56389-619-2
- Death After Death: ISBN 1-84023-333-8

The Books of Magic is the title of a four-issue English-language comic book miniseries written by Neil Gaiman, published by DC Comics, and later an ongoing series under the imprint Vertigo. The first issue came out in 1990. Since its original publication, the miniseries has also been published in a single-volume collection under the Vertigo imprint with an introduction by author Roger Zelazny. It tells the story of a young boy who has the potential to become the world's greatest magician.

== Miniseries ==
The Books of Magic began life when DC Comics decided to highlight some of their mystical characters across the range. They initially approached writer J. M. DeMatteis to script a prose book with illustrations from Jon J Muth, Kent Williams, Dave McKean and others, but when it reached the stage of confirming the artists' involvement, the suggested artists all declined to be involved. At that stage, DeMatteis also decided to step back, and DC instead approached popular writer Neil Gaiman and asked him to come up with a four-issue prestige-format series "about our magic characters". Drawing on a childhood spent working his way through the children's section in his local library and a childhood love of magic and fantasy stories such as T. H. White's The Once and Future King, Gaiman created an everyman character of a twelve-year-old boy, called Timothy Hunter, who would need to be given an extensive tour of the DC magical universe before being able to decide if he should embrace or reject his destiny as the world's greatest magician.

Gaiman used the four issues to formally split the structure of the story and allow for a different artist to draw each issue:

- In Book I: The Invisible Labyrinth (artwork by John Bolton), Tim is introduced to the history of the DC Universe by the Phantom Stranger.
- In Book II: The Shadow World (artwork by Scott Hampton), he is taken around the present world by John Constantine.
- In Book III: The Land of Summer's Twilight (artwork by Charles Vess) he visits Faerie, Gemworld, Skartaris, King Arthur's Camelot, Hell, and the other mystical realms with Doctor Occult.
- In Book IV: The Road to Nowhere (artwork by Paul Johnson) he travels to a possible future of the universe with Mister E.

This structure allowed Gaiman great scope to include various magical characters from across DC's ranges, as well as reintroducing characters that weren't currently in print. In his introduction to the collected edition, author Roger Zelazny also noted that the structure bore some similarity to the key story points of the mythic structure identified by Joseph Campbell's The Hero with a Thousand Faces, although he did allow that this might come from Gaiman's intimate knowledge of the same source material rather than a deliberate attempt to follow Campbell's guidelines. When the book was initially released over 1990/91, it proved very popular and led Vertigo executive editor Karen Berger to make it a regular ongoing series under editor Stuart Moore.

== Ongoing series ==
Tim Hunter made the ultimate choice to pursue magic in the Mister E miniseries by K. W. Jeter when he was forced to use magic to prevent Mister E from killing him. He was aided in this decision by The Phantom Stranger, Doctor Fate, and Zatanna.

Berger struggled to find a writer suitable for the project, however, with writers like Dick Foreman struggling to handle the character of Tim. Berger eventually approached John Ney Rieber after having seen some of his work, convinced that he would be able to meet the challenge of developing Tim into a fully rounded character. Rieber was asked to come up with a story outline for the proposed series, but these were rejected by Berger and DC. Still convinced that Rieber was the writer for the job, Berger asked him to persevere: he tried "several times to come up with something different, but it still didn't thrill anyone". At one point, Rieber himself tried to withdraw from the project, but Berger was still convinced that he could do it, and when the Vertigo The Children's Crusade event was being planned, she asked him to write one of the chapters to reintroduce Tim to the DC Universe.

The Arcana: The Books of Magic Annual was the sixth part of The Children's Crusade series, with artwork by Peter Gross. It introduced several characters created by Rieber that would be developed in the later ongoing series, such as Tim's biological father Tamlin, as well as starting off some of the ongoing book's storylines. The annual saw Neil Gaiman's first credit as "creative consultant" for The Books of Magic, a position which DC Comics paid him to carry out despite the fact that even when he did make comments on the script, he was told that it was too late for anything to be changed.

By the time the series launched, the name had returned to The Books of Magic and a regular rotating team of artists Gross, Gary Amaro and Peter Snejbjerg was put in place to provide artwork for alternating storylines. In early 1997, Rieber announced to Peter Gross that he was going to leave the comic. Gross attributed this to Rieber's growing dislike of the comic's central character, which Rieber seemingly confirmed in his "Afterward" for his final issue, saying: "I've found it difficult to like Tim now and then. Of course he gets on my nerves. He's a lot like someone I spent years learning not to be". Rieber's last issue was issue #50, coincidentally the point at which original co-creator Neil Gaiman decided that the time was right to stop "taking DC's $200 an issue and not doing anything" and resigned as creative consultant on the book.

With Rieber leaving, the series editor Stuart Moore championed Gross to take over scripting duties because "he got a great sense of story and character". Gross initially wrote a short memo detailing where he thought the series should go, hoping that it might influence the editors' choice of writer. Gross was then asked if he could expand his ideas into an actual story, and he plotted a six issue story that he thought might be used as a "filler" until a new writer could be found. DC encouraged him to think bigger until, by the time he started writing his first issue, he had plotted out a 23-issue-long story for the book. This soon expanded into plots for Gross' entire 25-issue run, despite Gross initially being nervous that his writing efforts would be unfavorably compared to those of Gaiman and Rieber by the series' fans.

As well as writing, Gross continued to provide artwork for the book, juggling this with a separate career teaching a class in Comic Illustration at Minneapolis College of Art and Design. Despite this, he still attempted to write full scripts for each issue, saying: "I like working that way so I can kind of forget about it before I sit down to draw. So when I draw it, I can think of it as something I didn’t write almost". This sometimes caused difficulties for Gross, and guest artists were used frequently to help lighten the load - and on one occasion, Peter Hogan was brought in to write a filler issue that gave Gross more time to catch up.

From the beginning of Gross' run, there were tentative plans for the comic to rest after it reached its 75th issue. Such a break would be used to allow the character of Tim Hunter to grow up a little before resuming his story - Gross had ideas for this later run to explore the character's relationship with the women in his life, through his relationship with his late mother. When the 75th issue was reached, however, Gross decided to move away from the book, and instead Dylan Horrocks continued Tim's story in a five-issue mini-series called The Names of Magic after a short break symbolizing Tim's readiness to face his destiny. The mini-series was followed by a new ongoing monthly series, titled Hunter: The Age of Magic.

== Storylines ==
=== Neil Gaiman ===
The original mini-series concentrated on Timothy Hunter's introduction to the world of magic by the Trenchcoat Brigade (the Phantom Stranger, Doctor Occult, Mister E, and John Constantine), who are aware that the boy has the potential to be the world's greatest magician but that his allegiance to good or evil is undecided. Equally, he could turn from the world of magic completely and be lost to either side. The Trenchcoat Brigade see it as their duty to resolve the uncertainty around Tim's fate one way or another.

They take him from the birth of the universe all the way through to its eventual death, ostensibly teaching him about the possibilities - and the price - of wielding magic before he decides whether to embrace his destiny. Along the way, Tim meets some of the DCU's more prominent magicians and fantasy characters, such as Merlin, Zatara, Doctor Fate, The Spectre, Madame Xanadu, Doctor Thirteen, Zatanna, Dream, John Constantine, Cain and Abel, Destiny, and Death, whilst his allies try to protect him from the machinations of the Cult of the Cold Flame. Following his misadventures, Tim decides that the price is too high, only to find that everything he has learnt from his supposed mentors has made it impossible for him to turn away from magic.

=== John Ney Rieber ===
==== Finding Tim's parents ====
As John Ney Rieber began the ongoing series, he used the stories to focus on telling Tim's story: he summed up his run later by saying "The Books of Magic aren't about Cool. They're about Tim". His first storyline, Bindings, for example ostensibly showed Tim discovering that since the realm of Faerie had cut itself off from Tim's world (the Mundane world) it was withering and dying, something that Titania hid from her people by using powerful glamours, but that Tim managed to permanently cure by "opening" the realm again to the Earth. This story, however, was merely the backdrop to a more personal story for Tim, as he discovered that the Falconer Tamlin (who kidnapped Tim during the events of the Arcana: The Books of Magic Annual) was actually his true father, and that the Faerie Queen Titania might be his mother: this revelation first appeared in a gaming guide to the DC Universe, possibly misinterpreting a scene in the original miniseries where Titania refers to Tim as "my son".

Bindings also brings Tim into conflict with a Manticore, who attempts to convince Tim of the non-existence of magic before hunting and killing him. Tim revives and releases a unicorn that has been similarly hunted, and destroys the Manticore, but not before he is poisoned by it. The boy nearly dies, until his father Tamlin performs a magic ritual which allows him to die in Tim's place. The boy recovers and returns to Earth with Titania's curses in his ears, having to come to terms with the revelation that the people he thought of as his parents - a mother who died in a car crash caused by his one-armed, grieving father - might be no relation to him at all.

Partly the Faerie storyline in Bindings was written to appease DC's desire for a "big" story to launch the new series with: Rieber's original starting point was to be the Summonings storyline instead, introducing Tim's first girlfriend Molly O'Reilly and demonstrating the writer's desire that the stories should be about "a realm that has never been mapped by the Royal Geographic Society and never will be. People who've lost touch with the place call it 'Adolescence'".

Rieber's run also contained several stories about the need to stay connected with the world that they live in. Several of his characters, including Tim, seek to avoid their problems in the real world by escaping into fantasy, but Rieber later explained that "wishing never solves anything in the Books. Have you noticed? At best, it gets you into trouble. About the only thing you can do in the Books that's more dangerous than wishing is surrendering to fantasies that others have constructed". The first of these characters living in another's fantasy is introduced in The Hidden School: playing on the suggestion in the original miniseries that Tim could grow to be a force for good or for evil, Rieber introduces a future version of the magician - Sir Timothy Hunter - who has tortured multiple versions of Molly all his life after coming under the sway of the demon Barbatos. Sir Timothy is under the mistaken impression that he is Barbatos' master and that he lives in grand luxury, when in truth Barbatos is manipulating him for his own ends and Sir Timothy lives in a cardboard box in a back alley.

Sir Timothy and Barbatos return to Tim's time from 2012 because Tim is the last boy in the multiverse who could possibly grow up to be Sir Timothy, and they intend to ensure that he does. Their plans are thwarted without Tim even being aware of them, as he has a guardian angel called Araquel who is chained between Heaven and Hell for having had a daughter called Nikki with Khara. Khara defeats Sir Timothy on Tim's behalf. The intervention doesn't mean that Tim is safe, however, as he has come to the attention of the last member of the Cult of the Cold Flame, a magician called Martyn.

Tim and his burnt father threatened by Martyn and Leah, from the cover to issue #7.

Martyn attempts to seduce Tim into becoming his servant using a succubus called Leah, using magic to make Tim's father spontaneously combust so that the boy is alone and vulnerable. Tim is saved once from Leah by the arrival of Molly, as the succubus is touched by the genuine love between the two, but in his grief and anger, Tim manages to push Molly away and cause Leah to think he is "just like all other men" and needs punishing. Tim's salvation from Martyn comes in an unlikely form when Sir Timothy and Barbatos kill the magician to protect their own interests in the boy. This leaves Leah without a master, a position that she attempts to make Tim fill before the young magician proves his worth by setting her free. She leaves England to see where her new freedom - and Martyn's car - will take her.

The next story arc followed on almost directly from the Arcana Annual, bringing back two of the children of Free Country: Daniel, the chimney sweep, and Marya, the girl who was sent to bring Tim to Free Country but decided to stay in the real world after she did. Marya has become friends with Molly, and gets invited on her and Tim's first date, but panics Tim when she tells Molly that her boyfriend is a magician, causing him to accidentally freeze them both with magic. He eventually manages to unfreeze them again, but fall prey to a monster of black, choking soot.

The monster is Daniel, expelled from Free Country and transformed by the Victorian era cyborg the Reverend Slagingham. Slagingham is collecting an army of down-and-outs, capturing their souls in magical contraptions: one of his minions, Gwendolyn, even manages to trick the Faerie King Auberon into surrendering his soul, leaving Titania's husband her helpless servant. The Reverend falls foul to Tim thanks to the intervention of one of his childhood imaginary friends made real, Awn the Blink, who has an amazing knack for fixing broken things. Daniel, meanwhile, gives up his attack when Marya rejects his affections. All that remains is for Tim to help return Auberon's soul to his body and return him, changed by his experiences, to his wife's side. For his trouble, Auberon tells Tim that Titania cannot possibly be his mother, since the boy has "not a drop" of Faerie blood in him. This is something never resolved in The Books of Magic themselves, and Auberon's observation proves nothing since The Books of Faerie series tells that Titania, herself, is actually human and not fairie.

==== Relationships and tattoos ====
Gwendolyn decides to stay and look after Tim while his father makes a miraculous recovery at the hands of the strange Mister Vasuki, eventually returning home after sharing a taxi with a young mother and her son Cyril.

Tim learns that he is an "Opener" and has unconsciously been making his fantasies real all his life—whether they be simple imaginary friends or entire worlds—Tim introduces Molly to some more of his imaginary friends made real, Tanger and Crimple, who live in a tree on some wasteland near Tim's house. The wasteland opens out into an entire magical world created unconsciously by Tim's childhood fantasies, but as Molly is exploring it with Crimple she ends up being kidnapped and taken to Hell.

Tanger and Tim head into Hell to rescue Molly and Crimple, who are being held by the strict governess Miss Vuall, the trainer of the multiple Mollies who are Sir Timothy Hunter's docile and dutiful companions. Sir Timothy, however, no longer needs the girls, as he has succeeded in releasing himself from Barbatos' control, only to be persuaded by a gang of dragons to become one of them because of his sadness and self-hatred. Molly and Crimple best Miss Vuall, and as Tim arrives the two children's love puts the finishing touches to her corner of Hell. Barbatos drags the children and the dragon Sir Timothy into another layer of Hell, where he attempts to salvage victory from defeat by trapping the two children in a fairy tale world where brave knights kill dragons.

Meeting the real Molly again, Sir Timothy is overcome with guilt and tells her his life story in the hope that she can prevent her Tim from becoming him. Tim, meanwhile, manages to see through all of Barbatos' attempts to trick him, and eventually brings the fairy tale world crashing down around their ears. Sir Timothy dies protecting Molly from the destruction unleashed by Tim, and the two children are reunited. As they return home, they leave Barbatos trapped in the ruins of the world he created, although he does briefly escape again.

Portion of the cover of issue #22, showing Tim's moth/scorpion tattoo.

Following Molly and Tim's disappearance, both find themselves grounded and banned from seeing each other. Molly manages to sneak out and ends up around a camp-fire discussing Tim with Marya and a mysterious tattooist who says she wants to help. The tattooist demonstrates her experience of both men and magic when Marya is again threatened by the arrival of Daniel: she removes the black soot that has transformed him, and changes him into the animal his soul most suits - a slow-witted but loyal puppy, that Marya happily adopts. Molly tells her companions about Sir Timothy Hunter, unaware that Tim has transformed himself into a cat and is listening in. The tattooist is aware, however: she traps Tim in his cat body long enough to take him to her home and thoroughly examine his soul, intending to do the same to him that she did with Daniel.

She has to change her plan when she is shocked to discover that Tim has no "inner animal" and that he is just a normal, healthy teenage boy. Instead, she offers to give him a tattoo that will stop him from ever hurting Molly: Tim agrees, and gains a moth/scorpion hybrid across his chest that stings him whenever he gets angry or performs magic. Soon after, Gwen decides it is time to move on when Tim's father begins a tentative relationship with Holly, the woman from the taxi. Almost immediately, Holly's son Cyril becomes a target of a demon's malign interest, and rescuing him helps Tim to decide that his presence is putting those he loves at risk. He runs away.

==== On the road ====
Molly, meanwhile, has been sent to visit her grandmother, a formidable old woman with a touch of second sight. Whilst up on Leanen Hill at her grandmother's suggestion, Molly learns that Tim has run away and resolves to find him again. She attempts to attract a fairy in the hope that they will grant her wish, but when she succeeds in drawing the Amadan to her, she accidentally challenges him to a contest to see who is the greatest fool. With the contest due to take place in Faerie, Molly is transported from the real world and left to fend for herself until it can be arranged. Knowing something of the Fair Folk from her grandmother, Molly knows that if she eats Faerie food she will never be able to return home: touching the ground would wither her and eating real food would starve her, so she would be forced to stay in Faerie. Instead, she attempts to grow her own real food, her efforts attracting the attention of the Faeries, and her stubbornness attracting the ire of Titania: the Queen tricks Molly into eating Faerie food by making her crops grow overnight. The trick backfires, though, as Molly's anger transforms her into "the burning girl", who cuts a swathe of destruction across Faerie with a horse named Prince.

Tim, meanwhile, is living rough on the streets when he is taken in by a homeless magician who knew his father. The magician provides the proper environment for Tim to let his tattoo come alive and leave him: it separates into its scorpion and moth parts and fights, with the moth destroying the scorpion. Tim is about to accept the moth back onto his heart when the magician distracts him, but the tattoo still manages to return to his arm. Following his experience, Tim decides that what he needs is a mentor to teach him about magic and sets off for America to find Zatanna.

At Los Angeles airport, he meets the succubus Leah who has moved to the city to become a model. She convinces Tim to travel with her, and accompanies him out into the desert on a camping trip. In the night, Leah disguises herself as Molly and tries to sleep with Tim: he sees through the deception but tells her that if she had come to him as herself, he wasn't sure what he would have done. Tim kisses Leah, and the two continue where they left off. In the morning, the two become trapped in the world of a dying mermaid and Leah has to take the mermaid's place to save Tim. Tim wakes in the real world and continues on his journey, without realizing what has happened to Leah.

Tim continues his travels across America, until he somehow ends up trapped on an island on the outskirts of Faerie. He manages to escape the island with the help of Huon the Small, the first King of Faerie. Huon and Tim travel into the heart of Faerie.

Molly and Prince have been joined by Titania's otherwise loyal flitling Yarrow, and have decimated the kingdom. Worse, Molly manages to unenchant Prince to reveal that he is in fact Titania's son and the heir to the throne: Prince has spent most of his life in Hell, given to the lords there in payment of a tithe originally agreed by Huon. In truth, Faerie is not a kingdom of its own, but part of Hell that Lucifer offered to the Fair Folk when they first left the Mundane World. Lucifer's will and belief created the realm. In revealing Prince's true nature - which Titania had attempted to hide to stop the Lords of Hell discovering that he had escaped home - Molly brings the armies of Hell to Faerie, demanding reparation or battle.

Tim watches Molly move away from him, on the cover of issue #42.

In the midst of all this, the fair folk have lost their own will, belief and reason for being in the Fairie. Without such belief, the realm and all who are in it start becoming undone by something known as "the Leveler". Battle is temporarily averted when the Lords of Hell learn of the Leveller's presence and seek to escape. The flitling Yarrow saves Fairie: her belief and loyalty cause it to be recreated in reality as exactly what it seemed to be - happy, natural and carefree - and with no tithe now owed to Hell. There is much celebration and as Tim and Molly are reunited, Titania tempers her curse as best she can: Molly's feet will no longer touch the ground and she will always have Faerie food to eat, so she can return to the mundane world with Tim.

Returning to Tim doesn't make Molly as happy as she hoped: instead of returning to London, Tim takes them to join Zatanna on tour and learn magic from her. His obsession with magic causes Tim to ignore everything else, including Molly's growing sadness and even the fact that her feet don't touch the floor. Zatanna tries to teach Tim to open his eyes, but in the end has no choice but to help Molly. As Molly learns of Tim's night with Leah - sad that he didn't think enough of her to tell her the truth - she breaks up with him, using a charm given to her by Zatanna to return home to her family. Tim reacts badly to Molly leaving, creating a whole world that he could mope in while toying with its natives' lives, until the demon Khara finds him. At first, she berates him for his inability to connect to the real world, until she spots his moth tattoo and realizes that it is preventing him from being able to connect so that he never has anyone close to him to get hurt. She encourages him to "open" himself and let the world in, which removes the tattoo and eventually leads Tim to decide that his magic belongs to the world and not him. He releases it into the universe and resolves that he will have nothing more to do with it.

==== Angels and visitations ====
Although Tim thinks he is finished with magic, magic is not finished with him. Returning home with the fallen angel Araquel — who had previously been tricked in to breaking his chains by Barbatos — Tim finds that the armies of Heaven and Hell are fighting each other to a standstill in the mortal world. The prize they are fighting for is the magic that Tim released into the world, which would give them the power to recreate the world to their own design.

Portion of cover to issue #49, showing Tim holding Araquel's body.

Tim's family find themselves caught in the crossfire of the battle when his father's wedding to Holly is interrupted by the groom transforming into a ravenous beast with a taste for angel-flesh. It transpires that Mister Vasuki, the surgeon who miraculously restored Mr Hunter to health after the fire, is in truth a demon hoping to force Tim to work for him. In retaliation, two angels elevate Tim's soon-to-be stepbrother Cyril to sainthood, and provide him with a foursome of living action-figures with dangerous powers. Araquel becomes their victim, turned into chocolate and smashed to pieces on the ground. Tim uses Awn the Blink and Reverend Slaggingham to trap all the angels and demons. In his anger, Tim throws an ice-cream at the leader of the angelic forces, only for her to merge with the leader of the demonic forces and reveal herself as Shivering Jemmy of the Shallow Brigade. She calls an end to the conflict having achieved her objective: to have "thrown in the face" ice cream.

Tim's new family try to settle back to normality, with Cyril and Tim's father returned to normal and his new stepmother blaming everybody's amnesia on too much wine at the reception. Tim is just enjoying his new freedom from magic when he finds the box that Leah used to live in: picking it up, he finds himself sucked inside it and trapped inside a small square of ground in a vast forest. He spends a lifetime there, talking to a tree that grew from a seed that fell inside his patch of ground. When a fire starts to destroy the forest, Tim's anger puts him back in touch with his magic as he tries desperately to save his one tree, but then finds himself returned outside the box, not a second older than the moment he was first trapped inside it.

Waiting for him is Leah, who trapped him in the box in the hope of teaching him an important lesson about his magic, but the lesson hasn't been learned in the way that she hoped, because of Tim's focus on the small scale: it wasn't the destruction of the forest that prompted him to reconnect with his magic, but the threat to the single tree. Exasperatingly, Leah cannot even decide if Tim is wholly wrong in thinking that way. Instead, she leaves Tim with the important reminder that he might try to throw away his magic, but he will never wholly succeed: it is a part of him, and always will be.

=== Peter Gross ===
Peter Gross explained in his 25 issue run on the book as being the story of Tim's "boy time", commenting that previously the book had often presented benevolent female characters but had been less successful at their benevolent male counterparts. His story was partly designed, then, to show Tim accepting his male side and learning how to be a boy, which is one of Gross' reasons for not using the character of Molly during his run. He did comment that if he had stayed on the book, Gross' next story would have shown Tim similarly exploring his feminine side and would therefore have reintroduced some of the established female characters such as Molly or Gwen.

He announced his run as going "in another direction" and not trying "to duplicate John's success". Consequently, his first issue laid down the background to his run, introducing Tim's "Other" (an alternate version of Tim created subconsciously when Tim was a child) and establishing that this Other was hunting through all the worlds Tim had unconsciously created during his life, trying to find the original and steal the original's power. Gross also showed a conscious break from exploring issues of Tim's parentage, having Titania announce that she would "never aid [Tim] again" after he refused to accept a precious - and potentially life-saving - gift from her. Molly, too, was to be less important to Gross' run — Tim is first warned to stay away from her by her protective brothers and then Molly herself decides to have nothing more to do with him after meeting his Other and mistaking him for Tim, thinking that he has broken his promise to never speak to demons and is well on the way to becoming Sir Timothy. Gross responded to "nearly everyone" asking if Molly was going to return by explaining that when he was asked to take over, John Ney Rieber had specifically asked for her not to stay in the comic and although this request was later withdrawn Gross thought it fitted the story he had plotted and made Tim more central to his own comic if she wasn't used. There was a spin-off ongoing series planned for her but was abandoned with the death of Vertigo editor Lou Stathis. Molly would return in the series Books of Magic during war times.

Gross' first story arc, then, dealt with Tim settling into Bardsley school and meeting Thomas Currie, a man who had traveled through various worlds searching for the true Tim to either prepare him to defeat his Other or kill him to prevent the Other stealing his power. Currie took advantage of the disappearance of a teacher at Bardsley so that he could take his place and interact with Tim, but this only caused problems for both as Tim's stepbrother Cyril saw the teacher die whilst potholing under the school and used the status he gained from controlling the other boys' access to the body to turn the school against the new teacher and Tim, although his influence only lasted until Tim and Currie removed the body and the teacher resigned. Tim makes a deal with Cyril to stay away from Bardsley in exchange for his stepbrother not telling Bill and Holly what Tim is really doing, getting private lessons in magic from Mr Currie to help him face his Other. Tim, however, is unaware that his Other has already arrived in the true world, causing a traffic accident that injures his father and Cyril and kills his stepmother, Holly.

This causes Currie to go onto a war footing: he kills Tim's father whilst he recovers in hospital to give Tim the emotional trauma he needs to subconsciously create another alternate world, and then manipulates the outburst of magic so that instead of a new world, Currie's version of Tim is recreated. The teacher then drains Tim's magic and hides it in a prearranged place: the true Tim leaves the world to learn how to control his magic and defeat his Other, whilst Currie and his alternate Tim remain to die in battle with the hope of convincing the Other that he has killed the true Tim. When the Other was convinced that he was triumphant, he used his power to open all the gateways between the worlds, allowing Tim to escape to the Inn Between the Worlds using his mother's glamor stone to disguise himself as a girl called Mary but also freeing the Wild Hunt, the god-killing band trapped for two-thousand years by a compact of rulers from Heaven, Faerie, Hell and other realms.

Sir Timothy Hunter, Tim's destiny, from the cover of issue #74.

Living as Mary and working at the Inn, Tim becomes best friends with a girl called Joh, but a relationship complicated when she sees him as Tim and falls in love with him, forcing Tim to admit the truth. The two are forced to flee, when the Wild Hunt are manipulated by a disguised Auberon into hunting Tim and destroying the Inn, a fate which Tim avoids only by challenging and defeating the leader of the Hunt. He then returns to Earth to reclaim his magic and defeat the Other to reverse the damage done in opening all the gates between the worlds.

In order to defeat the Other, Tim needs the help of the demon Barbatos, which can be achieved by selling a memory to the demon and sealing his fate as Sir Timothy Hunter. Tim faces up to his responsibilities, and sacrifices his future: Barbatos takes the memory of Tim's creation of his Other, making it impossible for the Other to exist separately from Tim and the many separate pieces of Tim are reunited for the first time in his life. Tim's soul is immediately forfeit to Barbatos, and he becomes his slave but sets in place the chain of events that eventually leads to the demon being defeated and trapped in the Dreaming. The final issue showed Barbatos released forty years later and allowed to return to hell. Once free, the demon discovered the true nature of Tim's apparent defeat: the boy had hidden his soul inside the memory Barbatos took and once inside the demon it slept, slowly taking complete control of Barbatos' body until Tim owned it completely, remodeling it with his magic to resemble his own at the age of fourteen. The final image of the issue, and The Books of Magic, showed Tim whole and complete, finally grown-up and ready to face whatever challenges the future held with "no more whining".

== Related works ==
=== Annuals ===
In addition to the mini-series and the ongoing series, Vertigo also produced four The Books of Magic annuals. The first, Arcana: The Books of Magic Annual, reintroduced Tim Hunter and launched the ongoing series. The second, actually titled The Books of Magic Annual #1 due to the change in name from "Arcana", told the story of Tim's encounter with a minor god's daughter who was one of Tamlin's cast-off conquests. Both these annuals were later included in the collected editions of The Books of Faerie and The Books of Faerie: Auberon's Tale respectively.

The third Annual is set during Tim's time in America, and sees him saving a child abuse victim from similar abuse at the hands of the Minotaur, transported to modern day America to hide in a nightclub called The Labyrinth. The final annual was the only one not to be written in its entirety by John Ney Rieber, coming part way into Peter Gross' run on the ongoing series. Gross used the annual to give some background to Tim's Other, showing his realization of the existence of other worlds and development into the ruthless character seen in the monthly series. The bulk of the annual was written by Gross, with contributions from John Ney Rieber and Mark Waid. Neither of these annuals have been republished in collected editions.

=== Vertigo Rave ===
An exclusive Books of Magic story, titled "The Lot" and written by Ney Rieber, appeared in Vertigo Rave #1, published in the fall of 1994.

=== The Books of Faerie ===
There were also three spin-off mini-series set in the Faerie realm, entitled The Books of Faerie. The first two volumes dealt with the rise to power of Titania and Auberon respectively, whilst the third documents the misadventures of Molly O'Reilly as she tried to come to terms with the curse placed upon her by Titania during the Girl in the Box storyline. There were also plans to create an ongoing The Books of Faerie series starring Molly O'Reilly, but these were eventually abandoned.

=== Hellblazer/The Books of Magic ===
In December 1997, a two-issue crossover with Hellblazer was published, with a script from the then current Hellblazer writer Paul Jenkins from a story written in collaboration with John Ney Rieber. The artwork was by artist Paul Lee.

The two issues showed Tim Hunter coming into possession of a time capsule that had been made by John Constantine as a child. The capsule contained all of Constantine's childhood innocence, placed there in one of his first acts of magic to rid himself of the perceived weakness. Tim attempts to return the box to its original owner, but Constantine wants nothing to do with it, until it falls into the hands of a demon called Kobal ("Master of the Infernal Theatre").

Tim and Constantine end up journeying to Hell, specifically Constantine's own Hell, described as much more dangerous than the fluffy monster Hell that Tim visited in the "Reckonings" storyline, where the younger magician manages to trick the demon into returning the box.

=== Winter's Edge ===
Vertigo published a number of winter specials under the title Winter's Edge, featuring short stories based on their current properties and featuring stories to preview upcoming series and one-shots. The Books of Magic featured in all three issues of Winter's Edge, with issue #1 containing "Thanks for Nothing" by John Ney Rieber and issues #2 and #3 featuring stories written Peter Gross. Issue #2 featured a story called "We Three Things", and issue #3 featured the Dead Boy Detectives in a tale set during Tim's time at one of the Inns Between the Worlds.

=== A Day, a Night and a Dream ===
As well as an abandoned The Books of Faerie ongoing series, Vertigo planned a prestige-format one shot called The Books of Magic: A Day, a Night and a Dream. The comic was to be written by Peter Gross and illustrated by Charles Vess, set during Tim's stay at one of the Inns Between the Worlds. The issue was intended to be an introduction to the ongoing series and the wider world of Vertigo, but was eventually incorporated into the main comic's storyline instead.

=== The Names of Magic ===
The depiction of Tim Hunter's life continued in a five-issue mini-series called The Names of Magic, in which Tim learnt his true name (Timothy Hunter; Tamar, son of Tamlin; the Opener; the Merlin; Magic) and was accepted into the school of magic, known simply as White School, which exists across the Multiverse of Worlds in DC.

=== Hunter: The Age of Magic ===
Another ongoing series called Hunter: The Age of Magic (25 issues) followed shortly after the end of this series. It ran from September 2001 to September 2003, and told of his graduation and what happened to him afterwards.

=== Books of Magick: Life During Wartime ===
Another series, Books of Magick: Life During Wartime began in July 2004 and lasted fifteen issues. This series depicts two Earths, both of which have a strong connection to an alternate version of Tim Hunter. On one of these worlds a war is going on between humans (known as the Bred) and the races of the Faerie (known as the Born). The world is ruled by the Born, but there is a resistance made up of both Born and Bred that features versions of Zatanna and John Constantine among others. The second world is one made by Tim Hunter as a place of safety where he can hide from his enemies.

== Collected editions ==
=== Paperback ===
The series have been collected into a number of trade paperbacks.

Title	Material collected	Publication date	ISBN
Four-issue prestige series (DC Comics)
The Books of Magic	Book I: The Invisible Labyrinth; Book II: The Shadow World; Book III: The Land of Summer's Twilight; Book IV: The Road to Nowhere	April 14, 1993	978-1563890826
Ongoing comic book series (Vertigo)
Book 1: Bindings	The Books of Magic #1-4: "Bindings: Prologue"; "Bindings", Parts 1–3	March 1, 1995	978-1563891878
Book 2: Summonings	The Books of Magic #5-13: "The Hidden School"; "Sacrifices", Parts 1–3; "The Artificial Heart", Parts 1–3; "Small Glass Worlds", Parts 1–2	May 1, 1996	978-1563892653
Book 3: Reckonings	The Books of Magic #14-20: "What Fire Leaves Us"; "Playgrounds", Parts 1–6	March 1, 1997	978-1563893216
Book 4: Transformations	The Books of Magic #21-25: "Heavy Petting"; "Needlepoint"; "Red Rover, Red Rover"; "And Sure in Language Strange She Said"; "Used to Bes"	September 1, 1998	978-1563894176
Book 5: Girl in the Box	The Books of Magic #26-32: "Rites of Passage: Prologue"; "Rites of Passage", Parts 1–6	August 1, 1999	978-1563895395
Book 6: The Burning Girl	The Books of Magic #33-41: "Rites of Passage", Parts 7–11; "Rites of Passage: Conclusion"; "Solitaire"; "The Motherless"; "Nothing Up My Sleeve"	July 1, 2000	978-1563896194
Book 7: Death After Death	The Books of Magic #42-50: "The Bridge"; "King of This"; "Slave of Heavens: Prologue"; "Slave of Heavens", Parts 1–4; "Slave of Heavens: Conclusion"; "The Box"	November 1, 2001	978-1563897405

Issues #51-75 of the ongoing The Books of Magic series remain uncollected in trade paperbacks.

Issues #1-5 of the Books of Magick: Life During Wartime series (with Dean Ormston) have been collected into a trade paperback (March 2005, ISBN 1-4012-0488-0).

=== Hardcover ===
Title	Material collected	Publication date	ISBN
The Books of Magic Omnibus vol.1	The Books of Magic (Series 1) #1-4; Mister E #1-4; The Children's Crusade #1-2; Arcana: The Books of Magic Annual #1; Vertigo Visions: Doctor Occult #1; "The Lot" from Vertigo Rave #1; The Books of Magic (Series 2) #1-32; The Books of Fairie: Auberon's Tale #1-3	December 8, 2020	978-1779504630
The Books of Magic Omnibus vol. 2	The Books of Magic (Series 2) #33-75; The Books of Magic Annual #1-3; The Books of Faerie #1-3; The Books of Faerie: Molly's Story #1-4; Hellblazer: Books of Magic #1-2; Vertigo: Winter's Edge #1-3	January 11, 2022	978-1779513205
The Books of Magic Omnibus vol. 3	The Trenchcoat Brigade #1-4; The Names of Magic #1-5; Hunter: The Age of Magic #1-25; Books of Magick: Life during Wartime #1-15.	November 22, 2022	978-1779517364

== Adaptations ==
=== Novels ===
In 2003, HarperCollins began publishing a series of Books of Magic young adult novels under the Eos imprint, adapted from the comics series, by Carla Jablonski. Each novel featured cover art by Christopher Moeller:

- The Books of Magic 1: The Invitation, May 2003, ISBN 0-06-447379-1
- The Books of Magic 2: Bindings, May 2003, ISBN 0-06-447380-5
- The Books of Magic 3: The Children's Crusade, August 2003, ISBN 0-06-447381-3
- The Books of Magic 4: Consequences, January 2004, ISBN 0-06-447382-1
- The Books of Magic 5: Lost Places, May 2004, ISBN 0-06-447383-X
- The Books of Magic 6: Reckonings, October 2004, ISBN 0-06-447384-8

The first book is based on the original miniseries. The subsequent books are based on story arcs in the second series; except The Children's Crusade, which is based on the Vertigo crossover event of the same name.

=== Films ===
A film version of The Books of Magic has been in development hell for many years. It was originally optioned "by Warner Bros. some years before the first Harry Potter book was published" (a series which has been frequently compared to this series (see Harry Potter influences and analogues)), with Neil Gaiman signing on as executive producer in 1998. After several years of drafting and redrafting, the script moved so far from the original concept that Gaiman and Paul Levitz advised the filmmakers that any audience seeing it expecting a film based on the comic would be disappointed, and decided to develop the film themselves. They worked with screenwriter Matt Greenberg, who had written early drafts of the original script, to come up with some closer to the original story. As yet, no adaption has been filmed or scheduled for release.

== References in other media ==
A section of Paul Cornell's Doctor Who spin-off novel Happy Endings features Death in a brief cameo, quoting her dialogue from the original The Books of Magic mini-series. The section was written by author Neil Penswick, as part of a chapter written in tandem by the authors of the previous 49 novels.

The faerie market in Gaiman's novel Stardust has many similarities to the one presented in the original miniseries. This may not be surprising as it's simply a case of Gaiman borrowing a portion of one work to use in the other.

In 2012, Timothy Hunter and the Books of Magic make a return in The New 52 series Justice League Dark where a reluctant Tim, having given up his magic, is reunited with John Constantine and Madame Xanadu to stop an old nemesis of Constantine's from getting his hands on the books.

== Reception ==
Maryanne Booth reviewed The Books of Magic: Summonings for Arcane magazine, rating it a 9 out of 10 overall. Booth comments that "although this is the third installment of the series, it's thankfully not essential to have already read the rest of the collection. Fortunately for those without masses of time on their hands, this graphic novel stands alone as a more than enjoyable read and comes highly recommended".

== See also ==
- List of The Books of Magic characters
