= John Ney Rieber =

American comic book writer

- Area: Writer
- Notable works: The Books of Magic; Captain America; G.I. Joe; Tomb Raider

John Ney Rieber is an American comic book writer.

== Career ==
John Ney Rieber's first professional work in comics was scripting over the finished pages of the graphic novel Tell Me, Dark, conceived by his late friend and mentor Karl Edward Wagner and artist Kent Williams. Initially, Williams approached Wagner with five pages of art asking him to write a story around that. Wagner agreed, and the pair signed a contract with DC Comics to release an 80-page hardcover graphic novel. At the beginning of production, the book's initial editor Karen Berger took an extended maternity leave. The replacement editors accepted Wagner's script, but as soon as Berger returned, she rejected the script and asked for rewrites, while Williams also changed some narrative elements as he saw fit. One year later, as the changes from all sides kept being made, Rieber, who at the time was working on the 4-issue prestige mini-series Shadows Fall for Disney Comics' failed Touchmark imprint, offered to rewrite the story using the finished pages after seeing the struggles that Wagner and Williams were going through:

It's a long story and not at all very fun to talk about, but the upshot of it all was that I ended taking the art that Kent had already done and generated a completely different story around it. DC had been unhappy about what they had gotten from Karl and they had pretty much decided that if they couldn't get revisions they would not publish the book. It meant among other things that Kent would have wasted a year of his life and a lot of beautiful art, so I gave Kent my script and an option of showing it to Karen Berger, if he felt like that was something he wanted to do, and eventually it was something he wanted to do.

After the collapse of Disney Comics, Art Young, Touchmark's Editor-in-Chief, went back to DC Comics and offered everyone he was developing projects with to continue working for DC's new imprint Vertigo. Rieber and his collaborator John Van Fleet agreed, and Shadows Fall was released as a 6-issue regular format mini-series from November 1994 to April 1995. Sometime between Tell Me, Dark and Shadows Fall, Rieber was approached by Berger to write an ongoing continuation of Neil Gaiman's The Books of Magic mini-series; despite having every proposal and outline rejected by editorial and even once trying to quit the idea, Rieber was still hired and wrote the book from issue #1 (May 1994) to 50 (July 1998), including various annuals, specials and spin-offs.

Rieber's next major project was a Captain America relaunch for the Marvel Comics' Marvel Knights imprint, first announced in August 2001. Commenting on the assignment, Rieber said he was hired "accidentally", after then-Marvel Knights editor Stuart Moore mentioned the book in a conversation, offered Rieber to write some samples and liked them enough to give him the book (despite "looking for a heavy hitter <...> like Frank Miller or Greg Rucka"; in a 2013 interview, Rucka confirmed he wrote some samples for that relaunch but was rejected in favor of Rieber.) In addition to the ongoing Captain America series, Rieber was supposed to write two mini-series starring the character: the out-of-continuity Captain America: Ice, which was announced in February 2002 by the artist Jae Lee and subsequently integrated into the main book as its third arc, and another one, unannounced, which was supposed to bridge the three-month gap between the previous volume and the Marvel Knights one (the writer of the eventual bridging mini-series Darko Macan later confirmed that it was Rieber who was supposed to be the original writer.)

The series itself was plagued by delays and controversy from the very beginning. According to Macan, who received the information from the outgoing Captain America editor Andrew Lis, Rieber had to back out of writing the bridging mini-series due to the September 11 attacks, supposedly, to rewrite whatever material he already had to reflect on the event. The first arc, titled "The New Deal" (February to November 2002), had Captain America questioning the American government, with the topic receiving worldwide coverage in the press. While Rieber's original outline for the series was supposed to start with "The Extremists", which became the title's second arc, he ended up leaving the assignment halfway into that storyline, with three issues finished out of five planned:

Probably the simplest way that I can describe what happened is that Joe Quesada has a very clear vision about what he wants Cap to be, and my Cap just wasn't quite what he was looking for. They liked a lot of my ideas, but some of the approaches that I had to storytelling and structuring things and the weighting of the character just wasn't meshing with his vision. In the end, I was doing lots and lots of rewriters of scripts, and it was slowing things down. We all reached a place where we realized that it might be better if someone else was doing the book. I guess that's the long way of saying that we had creative differences.

To finish both "The Extremists" and "Ice" (which, by the time Rieber left, had only one fully scripted issue), Marvel hired Chuck Austen who was also rejected at the launch in favor of Rieber but still agreed to bring his plots to a close.

== Bibliography ==
=== DC Comics ===
- Tell Me, Dark (with Kent Robert Williams, graphic novel, hc, 80 pages, 1992, ISBN 1-56389-032-1; sc, 1992, ISBN 1-56389-088-7)
  - The book is scripted by Rieber over pages of Williams' art, which were drawn for an earlier script written by Karl Edward Wagner.
  - For more information, see the Career section.
- Vertigo:
  - The Books of Magic:
    - Arcana Annual: "Long Walks in Dancing Shoes" (with Peter Gross, 1994) collected in The Books of Faerie (tpb, 144 pages, 1998, ISBN 1-56389-401-7)
    - The Books of Magic vol. 2 (with Gary Amaro, Peter Gross, Peter Snejbjerg, John Ridgway (#20) and Jill Thompson (#42), 1994–1998) collected as:
      - Bindings (collects #1–4, tpb, 112 pages, 1995, ISBN 1-56389-187-5)
      - Summonings (collects #5–13, tpb, 240 pages, 1996, ISBN 1-56389-265-0)
        - Includes "The Lot" short story (art by Gary Amaro) from Vertigo Rave (one-shot, 1994)
      - Reckonings (collects #14–20, tpb, 224 pages, 1997, ISBN 1-56389-321-5)
      - Transformations (collects #21–25, tpb, 128 pages, 1998, ISBN 1-56389-417-3)
      - Girl in the Box (collects #26–32, tpb, 192 pages, 1999, ISBN 1-56389-539-0)
      - The Burning Girl (collects #33–41, tpb, 192 pages, 2000, ISBN 1-56389-619-2)
      - Death After Death (collects #42–50, tpb, 224 pages, 2001, ISBN 1-56389-740-7)
    - The Books of Magic Annual:
      - The Books of Faerie: Auberon's Tale (tpb, 128 pages, 1999, ISBN 1-56389-502-1) includes:
        - "Dark as Day, My Lady, Bright as Night" (with Mark Buckingham, in #1, 1997)
      - "Horn" (with Jamie Tolagson, in #2, 1998)
      - "The Kite" (with Peter Gross, co-feature in #3, 1999)
    - Hellblazer/The Books of Magic #1–2 (co-written by Rieber and Paul Jenkins, art by Paul Lee, 1997–1998)
    - Winter's Edge #1: "Thanks for Nothing" (with Steve Parkhouse, anthology, 1998)
  - Shadows Fall #1–6 (with John Van Fleet, 1994–1995)
  - Mythos: The Final Tour #1–3 (with Gary Amaro (#1), Peter Snejbjerg (#2) and Teddy Kristiansen + Dean Ormston (#3), 1996–1997)
  - Weird War Tales vol. 2 #4: "Salvation" (with Danijel Žeželj, anthology, 1997)
  - The Trenchcoat Brigade #1–4: "Misery" (with John Ridgway, 1999)
  - The Books of Faerie: Molly's Story #1–4 (with Hermann Mejia and Ryan Kelly (#4), 1999)
  - Strange Adventures vol. 2 #4: "Perfect Stranger" (with Danijel Žeželj, anthology, 2000)
  - Sandman Mystery Theatre: Sleep of Reason #1–5 (with Eric Nguyen, 2007) collected as Sandman Mystery Theatre: Sleep of Reason (tpb, 128 pages, 2007, ISBN 1-4012-1454-1)

=== Other publishers ===
- Ray Bradbury Comics #5: "Picasso Summer" (with John Van Fleet, anthology, Topps, 1993) collected in The Best of Ray Bradbury: The Graphic Novel (tpb, 160 pages, iBooks, 2003, ISBN 0-7434-7476-7)
- Marvel:
  - Wolverine: Killing (with Kent Robert Williams, graphic novel, 48 pages, 1993, ISBN 0-7851-0001-6) collected in Wolverine: Inner Fury (tpb, 464 pages, 2020, ISBN 1-302-92390-0)
  - Captain America vol. 4 (with John Cassaday, Trevor Hairsine (#7–9) and Jae Lee (#12); issues #8–9 and 12 are scripted by Chuck Austen from Rieber's plots, Marvel Knights, 2002–2003) collected as:
    - The New Deal (collects #1–6, hc, 176 pages, 2003, ISBN 0-7851-0978-1; tpb, 2003, ISBN 0-7851-1101-8)
    - The Extremists (includes #7–9, tpb, 120 pages, 2003, ISBN 0-7851-1102-6)
    - Ice (includes #12, tpb, 128 pages, 2003, ISBN 0-7851-1103-4)
    - Marvel Knights: Captain America Volume 1 (includes #1–9 and 12, tpb, 408 pages, 2016, ISBN 0-7851-9633-1)
- Neil Gaiman's Wheel of Worlds #0 (anthology, Tekno Comix, 1995) collected in Neil Gaiman's Teknophage Volume 1 (tpb, 232 pages, Super Genius, 2015, ISBN 1-62991-277-8)
  - The entire issue is plotted by Rieber and Neil Gaiman, with various writers scripting each individual story:
    - The framing sequence, "Adam Cain", is written by Rieber and drawn by Shea Anton Pensa.
    - "Lady Justice" is written by C. J. Henderson and drawn by Michael Netzer.
    - "Mr. Hero" is written by James Vance and drawn by Ted Slampyak.
    - "Teknophage" is written by Rick Veitch and drawn by Bryan Talbot.
- Image:
  - Tomb Raider (with Randy Green, Gerardo Sandoval (#24 and 29), Michael Turner (#25), Scott Benefiel (#28), Tony Daniel (#30) and Pop Mhan (#31), Top Cow, 2002–2003) collected as:
    - Tomb Raider Compendium (includes #21–31, tpb, 1,280 pages, 2006, ISBN 1-58240-637-5; hc, 2008, ISBN 1-58240-803-3)
    - Tomb Raider Archives Volume 2 (includes #21–24 and 26–31, hc, 464 pages, Dark Horse, 2017, ISBN 1-5067-0352-6)
  - 24Seven (series of anthology graphic novels):
    - Volume 1: "The Pit" (with Chris Brunner, 224 pages, 2006, ISBN 1-58240-636-7)
    - Volume 2: "Cane" (with Ben Templesmith, 240 pages, 2007, ISBN 1-58240-846-7)
  - Comic Book Tattoo: "Winter" (with Ryan Kelly, anthology graphic novel, hc, 480 pages, 2008, ISBN 1-58240-965-X; sc, 2008, ISBN 1-58240-964-1)
- G.I. Joe (Devil's Due):
  - Transformers/G.I. Joe #1–6 (with Jae Lee, Dreamwave, 2003) collected as Transformers/G.I. Joe: Tyrants Rise, Heroes are Born (tpb, 168 pages, 2004, ISBN 0-9733817-9-5)
  - G.I. Joe Reborn (with Joe Bennett and Javier Saltares, one-shot, 2004) collected in G.I. Joe Reborn (tpb, 96 pages, 2004, ISBN 1-932796-02-9)
  - G.I. Joe Reloaded (with Javier Saltares, Eddy Barrows (#1), Ron Lim (#3), Jason Millet and Darryl Banks (#7), 2004) collected as:
    - In the Name of Patriotism (collects #1–6, tpb, 144 pages, 2005, ISBN 1-932796-23-1)
    - An Act of Treason (includes #7–9, tpb, 144 pages, 2005, ISBN 1-932796-22-3)
- Army of Two: Dirty Money (with Brandon McKinney, graphic novel, 112 pages, Prima Games, 2008, ISBN 0-7615-5744-X)
- Unknown 9 Archives Preview (with Jae Lee, digital mini-comic, Dark Horse, 2018)

Preceded by Neil Gaiman	The Books of Magic writer 1994–1998	Succeeded by Peter Gross
Preceded by Dan Jurgens	Captain America writer 2002–2003 (2003 with Chuck Austen)	Succeeded by Dave Gibbons
Preceded by Dan Jurgens	Tomb Raider writer 2002–2003	Succeeded by James Bonny
