= Tim Hunter (DC Comics) =

Publication information
- Publisher: DC Comics; Vertigo Comics
- First appearance: The Books of Magic #1 (January 1990)
- Created by: Neil Gaiman; John Bolton

In-story information
- Alter ego: Timothy Hunter; Tamar (birth name)
- Species: Human
- Place of origin: London, United Kingdom
- Team affiliations: Trenchcoat Brigade; Justice League Dark; The Wild Hunt
- Partnerships: John Constantine; Rose Psychic
- Notable aliases: The Merlin, The Opener, The Hunter, Lord of the Hunt
- Abilities: Untapped magical abilities with a god-level of mystic potential and highly intelligent

Tim Hunter is a fictional character appearing in American comic books published by DC Comics. He first appeared in The Books of Magic #1 (January 1990) and was created by Neil Gaiman and John Bolton. Appearing often as a protagonist within various Books of Magic series and related spin-offs under the Vertigo Comics imprint, the character is a seemingly unassuming English boy whose potential marks him among the most powerful magic users within the modern era, attracting factions such as the Trenchcoat Brigade and Cult of the Cold Flame alike as he is subjected to fantastical journeys and mystical adventures while having to choose whether his destiny lies with the forces of good or evil.

== Publication history ==
Tim Hunter was created by writer Neil Gaiman when DC Comics asked him to come up with a four issue prestige-format series "about our magic characters". Drawing on a childhood spent working his way through the children's section in his local library and a childhood love of magic and fantasy stories such as T. H. White's The Once and Future King, Gaiman created a character reminiscent of Wart except that instead of being destined to be King, Tim Hunter's destiny was to become the world's greatest magician.

Gaiman's story was structured to use different artists for each issue, and it was the artist for the first issue, John Bolton, who designed Tim's appearance, basing him on his own son. When The Books of Magic was initially released over 1990–91, it proved very popular and led Vertigo Comics executive editor Karen Berger to make it a regular ongoing series under editor Stuart Moore.

Initially, the editors had a difficult time finding someone to write the series, with Tim Hunter proving a tricky character to get right. Although he already appeared in a mini-series, the character's main function had been to bear witness to the past, present and future of magic in the DC universe and so did not offer a writer much detail to work with. Karen Berger eventually settled on writer John Ney Rieber to continue Tim's story. Rieber expanded Tim's character using his own memories of being 14, later saying: "I don't believe that my soul is likely to be shuffled off to Purgatory after I die. What would be the point? I've been fourteen already". Rieber utilized his own teenage confusion and delight in writing Tim, while introducing his first girlfriend, Molly, as a counterpoint. Molly was the opposite of Tim in nearly every way, someone "who'd already figured out the best thing you could possibly do with your life was live it".

While Rieber's personal connection to Tim gave the character a sense of realism, it also was a source of frustration for the writer. He later said: "I've found it difficult to like Tim now and then. Of course he gets on my nerves. He's a lot like someone I spent years learning not to be". This dislike led to a perceived decline in the quality of the book as Rieber wrote his final batch of issues, with the character of Tim often sidelined in the stories in favor of his girlfriend, Molly. This preference also affected Tim's character in other ways, as Rieber requested that Molly not be used in the book after his departure to allow him to develop his own projects using her, causing the in-story break up of the two young lovers that led to them not seeing each other for many years.

Rieber was replaced on the series by his main artist, Peter Gross, who decided that the character had been dominated by strong female characters and also had shown himself to be resistant to change and evolution, pulling away from other characters and situations that would require him to adapt. He resolved to concentrate on Tim's "boy time" and introducing the concept of the boy magician using his magic subconsciously to protect himself, separating painful emotions off into alternate worlds and alternate Tims: the 25 issue run told the story of Tim regaining all of those disparate pieces of himself, leaving him whole and more rounded for the end of the series.

It had always been the intention to have a clean break in the series after Gross' first 25 issues to allow the character time to grow up, with Gross having some ideas about where he would take the character next. When the time came, however, DC opted to relaunch the series as Hunter: The Age of Magic with writer Dylan Horrocks. Horrocks introduced the series with a five-issue miniseries, The Names of Magic, that ended with the character learning his true heritage and names and enrolling in a school of magic: this allowed Horrocks to show a more mature version of Tim in the ongoing series, set after Tim's graduation from the school, and deal with real-life issues that had not been previously covered in The Books of Magic, like bills and hangovers.

Horrocks was initially attracted to the concept of the original series, seeing a great connection with the character of Tim and the ability to tell fantasy stories using realistic, real-life characters. In particular, he relished the opportunity to write about Tim's love life (eventually reintroducing the character of Molly to the book) and also to approach issues of morality: he used the stories to resolve for Tim the question that was asked about him at the start of Neil Gaiman's miniseries — would he be good or evil. It also took Tim into the opening stages of the magical conflict mentioned in Gaiman's series that he was to play such a pivotal role in. The series was cancelled after 25 issues, and Vertigo decided to relaunch again, this time bringing back a Tim Hunter in Si Spencer's Books of Magick: Life During Wartime.

This series distanced itself from the previous iterations of the character and marketed itself towards a more adult audience, with the variation on the title's spelling intended as a signifier of that distance. Although the story featured Tim Hunter coping with a magical war, it was set on a world populated by alternate versions of Zatanna and John Constantine, though ultimately it implied that the John Constantine and Tim Hunter of that series had originated in the "standard" Vertigo universe.

Following the 2011 companywide DC reboot, Tim Hunter appeared in the non-Vertigo Justice League Dark title. His appearance in the mainstream DCU seems to only take into account the events of the original Books of Magic miniseries.

== Powers and abilities ==
Tim Hunter's wide breadth of potential originates from his status as an Opener, a magical being with high potential connected to a powerful source of magic (referred to as the Myrddin or Merlin) as a conduit. While possessing unfathomable potential, his power remains untapped due to having limited training, with powers such as being able to project bolts of mystic energy, portals to various worlds, warping the fabric of reality, creating entire dimensions, conjuration, reconstructing matter, telepathy, telekinesis, and his senses inclined towards the supernatural. He is also considered highly intelligent.

Hunter is assisted by several mystical artifacts, such as the Stone of Opening, supporting his abilities as an Opener, although due to its costly use, he eventually opts to no longer use it. He also possesses the Key of Worlds, independently allowing travel between other worlds. He is notably assisted by the Books of Magic, artifacts which he is prophesized to use safely and act as a guide to magic. Due to its use being limited to him, the book appears empty, and can warn him of danger. He also later enchants a magical screwdriver to act in place of a wand to focus his magic.

== Reception ==
=== Comparisons to Harry Potter ===
Since the 1997 publication (and subsequent success) of the first book in J. K. Rowling's Harry Potter series, fans of The Books of Magic have noted some similarities between the two protagonists: both are normal, bespectacled teenage boys who have lost their mothers, and discover that they are destined to become powerful magicians while gaining an owl as a pet. The similarity was noted by a journalist from The Scotsman newspaper, who asked Gaiman if he thought Rowling was aware of his 1990 comic, to which Gaiman replied that he "wasn't the first writer to create a young magician with potential, nor was Rowling the first to send one to school".

A story in the Daily Mirror reported that Gaiman had accused Rowling of plagiarism, and was repeated in the Daily Mail. Gaiman has stressed, "This is not true, I never said this", and when asked, repeats his belief that Rowling had not read The Books of Magic and that the similarities most likely result from both being inspired by similar works, in particular those of T. H. White. Hunter: Age of Magic author Dylan Horrocks has pointed out that neither Hunter nor Potter was truly an original idea, with another boy wizard preceding Hunter in comics, and they should be considered more as part of a genre:

The superficial similarities are striking - but no more so than any number of other stories in the genre. As Gaiman has repeatedly said, he and Rowling were merely drinking from the same well. In fact, there was even a story in 2000AD (called the Journals of Luke Kirby) which came out a few years before The Books of Magic, which was extremely similar to both the BoM and Harry Potter. This is a genre - and Gaiman and Rowling are both playing with the conventions of the genre, to different ends.

In the last issue of the ongoing (second) The Books of Magic series, writer/artist Peter Gross made several references to Rowling's stories: Tim's stepbrother Cyril (similar to Harry's cousin Dudley) accidentally finds one of Tim's artifacts, a glamour stone, which causes him to appear as Tim in a manner reminiscent of Polyjuice Potion. He is then shown walking through the wall between platforms 9 and 10 at a train station.
