= Peter Gross (comics) =

American comic book writer and artist

- Born: 1958 (age 67–68) St. Cloud, Minnesota, United States
- Areas: Writer, Penciller
- Notable works: The Books of Magic; Lucifer; The Unwritten

Peter Gross is an American comic book writer and artist known for such works as The Books of Magic, Lucifer and The Unwritten.

== Biography ==
Gross attended St. John's University and did graduate studies at the University of Wisconsin-Superior. He intended to make a living as a fine artist, but was drawn into comics, first doing some work for Marvel and then following it up with his originally-self-published series Empire Lanes.

== Bibliography ==
Comics work includes:

- The Books of Magic #4, 6–8, 18–19, 21–30, 39–41, 43–62, 64–75 (art and (from #51) script, with writer John Ney Rieber, ongoing series Vertigo, August 1994 – August 2000)
- Lucifer #5–8, 10–13, 15–19, 21–23, 25–27, 29–32, 34–40, 42–44, 46–49, 51–54, 56–57, 59–61, 63–65, 67–69, 71–72, 74–75 (with writer Mike Carey, ongoing series, Vertigo, October 2000 – August 2006) collected as:
  - Volume 2 Children and Monsters (collects Lucifer #5–13, Vertigo, 2001, ISBN 1-84023-391-5)
  - Volume 3 A Dalliance with the Damned (collects Lucifer #14–20, Vertigo, 2002, ISBN 1-84023-470-9)
  - Volume 4 The Divine Comedy (collects Lucifer #21–28, Vertigo, 2003, ISBN 1-84023-693-0)
  - Volume 5 Inferno (collects Lucifer #29–35, Vertigo, 2004, ISBN 1-4012-0210-1)
  - Volume 6 Mansions of the Silence (collects Lucifer #36–41, Vertigo, 2004, ISBN 1-4012-0249-7)
  - Volume 7 Exodus (collects Lucifer #42–44 & #46–49, Vertigo, 2005, ISBN 1-4012-0491-0)
  - Volume 8 The Wolf Beneath the Tree (collects Lucifer #45 & #50–54, Vertigo, 2005, ISBN 1-4012-0502-X)
  - Volume 9 Crux (collects Lucifer #55–61, Vertigo, 2006, ISBN 1-4012-1005-8)
  - Volume 10 Morningstar (collects Lucifer #62–69, Vertigo, 2006, ISBN 1-4012-1006-6)
  - Volume 11 Evensong (collects Lucifer #70–75, Vertigo, 2007, ISBN 1-4012-1200-X)
- Chosen (with writer Mark Millar, 3-issue mini-series, Dark Horse Comics, 2004, tpb, Image Comics, 72 pages, December 2008, ISBN 1-60706-006-X)
- The Unwritten (with Mike Carey, ongoing series, Vertigo, July 2009 - 2015)
