= Dusty – The Original Pop Diva =

Dusty
- The Original Pop Diva
- Melbourne premiere souvenir programme
- Music: Songs recorded by Dusty Springfield
- Book: John-Michael Howson; David Mitchell; Melvyn Morrow
- Productions: 2006 Melbourne (world premiere); 2006 Australian tour 2016 Melbourne; 2016–17 Adelaide

Dusty – The Original Pop Diva is an Australian jukebox musical based on the life of Dusty Springfield. The book of the musical was written by John-Michael Howson, David Mitchell and Melvyn Morrow. Dusty received its world premiere on 12 January 2006 at the State Theatre of the Victorian Arts Centre, Melbourne, Australia.

== History ==
Howson, Mitchell and Morrow had collaborated on SHOUT!, a successful Australian jukebox musical based on the life of Johnny O'Keefe. The book writers and SHOUT! producer Dennis Smith "wanted to produce another biographical musical based on the life of a major musical star, but this time [...] believed the star should be either English or American and someone who had enjoyed international and not just local fame." A number of singers were considered before Springfield was selected after Mitchell read Dancing with Demons, a biography co-written by former Springfield manager and confidante Vicki Wickham.

The first draft of the script was written by early 2002 and John Gilbert came forward as sole investor after which a workshop was held in March 2004. The workshop cast included Tamsin Carroll, Trisha Noble, Mitchell Butel and Todd Goddard, who all went on to appear in the world premiere production co-produced by Dennis Smith and John and Barbara Gilbert. The writers approached and received input to the script from Vicki Wickham (although the musical's book is not directly based on Wickham's book).

The Australian Broadcasting Corporation (ABC-TV) made a documentary series of 8 x 26-minute episodes titled "Dusty – Little By Little" which followed the creation of the musical from its genesis in 2004 to opening night in 2006. The series was first broadcast in Australia during March and April 2006.

=== Other stage versions of Dusty Springfield's life ===
Dusty – The Original Pop Diva is not the only time Springfield's life has been dramatised on stage and the musical should not be confused with other adaptations such as the 2005 American play with music A Girl Called Dusty by Susann Fletcher or the 2000 British musical Dusty: the Musical by Paul Prescott, or the 2018 production Dusty – The Dusty Springfield Musical to a book by Jonathan Harvey.

An earlier Australian dramatisation of Springfield's life, entitled I Only Wanna Be with You, was first performed in Melbourne in 1995. Written by Terry O'Connell, it incorporated 35 songs performed by Wendy Stapleton with three female back-up singers referred to as "The Stayawhiles". The show subsequently toured Australia, New Zealand and the United Kingdom. A cast recording, featuring fifteen songs from the show, has also been released. Stapleton, whose physical and vocal resemblance to Springfield is uncanny, has since portrayed her again in touring productions of Girls Girls Girls and Dusty, Doris & Me.

An Off-Broadway musical titled Forever Dusty played at New York's New World Stages in 2012. It was created by Kirsten Holly Smith and Jonathan Vankin and starred Smith as Ms. Springfield.

== Synopsis ==
In the 1950s, a star-struck, plain and dumpy London schoolgirl imagines she could become a glamorous movie idol. Her parents tell her that her fantasies will never come true and not to dream the impossible dream. But nothing deters her, and blessed with an amazing voice and talent, she sets out to become a singer and star. Soon, plain Mary O'Brien has transformed herself into the blonde pop icon, Dusty Springfield. But while Dusty, the gorgeous blonde star, is the image the world sees, it is an illusion behind which little Mary O'Brien still lives; the alter ego from which Dusty can never escape and who remains with her throughout her life.

In the 1960s, Dusty Springfield takes the entertainment world by storm with a score of hits, a top television show and a legion of fans. But the success she wanted is hollow and real happiness eludes her. Driven by her sense of perfection, Dusty takes on the world even as she discovers a desperate need to be loved in a way that could cause her career to crash. At the pinnacle of international success, with triumphs in Britain and America, Dusty finds the pressure unbearable. Unable to be what other people expect, and finding the spotlight's heat can burn, she retreats from the world into a dark place.

Finding strength in adversity, Dusty returns to soar to the top. With the world applauding again, she has one more battle to fight.

== List of musical numbers ==
Act I

- Overture
- "I Only Want to Be with You" – Dusty
- Yesterday When I Was Young – Dusty
- When the Midnight Choo Choo Leaves for Alabam' – Mary and Tom
- Dusty Springfield – Mary
- Mama's Little Girl – Mary and Dusty
- Little by Little 1 – Mary and The Lana Sisters
- Seven Little Girls Sitting in the Back Seat – Al Saxon and The Lana Sisters
- Little by Little 2 – Mary and The Springfields
- Springfields Medley – The Springfields
- Little by Little 3 – Dusty, Rodney and Peg
- Stay Awhile – Dusty
- Nothing Has Been Proved – Dusty and Company
- Dancin' in the Street – Reno and The Nevadas
- Dancin' in the Street (Reprise) – Dusty, Reno and Company
- Wishin' and Hopin' – Dusty and Reno
- My Generation – Company
- The Look of Love – Dusty
- Stay Awhile (Reprise) – Dusty and Company
- The Look of Love (Reprise) – Reno
- Who Can I Turn to? – Dusty and Mary

Act II

- In the Middle of Nowhere – Dusty
- I Just Don't Know What to Do with Myself – Dusty and Reno
- The Windmills of Your Mind – Dusty
- Son of a Preacher Man – Dusty
- I Close My Eyes and Count to Ten – Dusty and Reno
- Soft Core – Reno and Company
- My Colouring Book – Kay
- I Think It's Going to Rain Today – Dusty and Company
- Quiet Please, There's a Lady on Stage – Dusty and Girls
- What Have I Done to Deserve This? – Neil Tennant and Dusty
- Heart and Soul – Dusty, Rodney and Peg
- I Close My Eyes and Count to Ten (Reprise) – Reno
- All I See Is You – Dusty and Mary
- "You Don't Have to Say You Love Me" – Dusty and Company
- Dusty Megamix – Company

== Productions ==
The original production and Australian tour premiered on 12 January 2006 at the State Theatre of the Victorian Arts Centre, Melbourne, Australia. Seasons at the Lyric Theatre at Star City, Sydney and the Lyric Theatre at the Queensland Performing Arts Centre (from 29 August 2006) followed.

The Australian tour closed on 21 September 2006 after 253 performances with close to 400,000 audience members having attended the show.

Major cast members included:

- Dusty Springfield – Tamsin Carroll
- Rodney – Mitchell Butel
- Peg – Kay Tuckerman
- Kay O'Brien – Trisha Noble
- Mary O'Brien – Alexis Fishman
- Mr. O'Brien – Glenn Butcher
- Reno – Deni Hines

Major creatives included:

- Director – Stuart Maunder
- Set and costume design – Roger Kirk
- Choreography – Ross Coleman
- Musical arrangements, direction and supervision – Stephen 'Spud' Murphy
- Lighting design – Trudy Dalgleish
- Sound design – Michael Waters
- Executive producer – Sue Farrelly
- Producer – Dennis Smith

A production at the Australian Institute of Music, featuring the Music Theatre Students, opened on 3 September 2009.

Dunedin Operatic Society, in Dunedin, New Zealand, staged the New Zealand premier of 'Dusty' in April 2010.

In 2016 a tweaked version of the musical was produced by The Production Company, and staged at the Playhouse of Arts Centre Melbourne from 12 to 4 November 4 December. The cast starred Amy Lehpamer as Dusty, Baylie Carson as Young Dusty, Todd McKenney as Rodney, Virginia Gay as Peg, Tyler Coppin and Anne Wood as Dusty's parents, and Elenoa Rokobaro as Reno. The production then transferred to Adelaide, where it was staged at the Adelaide Festival Centre from 31 December 2016 to 22 January 2017. Chloe Zuel replaced Elenoa Rokobaro as Reno during the Adelaide run.

== Response ==
The original production of Dusty was nominated for seven 2006 Helpmann Awards, including two nominations in the "Best Female Actor in a Supporting Role in a Musical" category, and won four:

- Best Musical
- Best Direction of a Musical (Stuart Maunder)
- Best Musical Direction of a Musical (Stephen 'Spud' Murphy – winner)
- Best Sound Design (Michael Waters – winner)
- Best Choreography in a Musical (Ross Coleman – winner)
- Best Female Actor in a Musical (Tamsin Carroll – winner)
- Best Female Actor in a Supporting Role in a Musical (Deni Hines and Alexis Fishman)

== Recordings ==
The original production did not release a full cast album, just a four-track CD that was only available at the theatre. A compilation CD of 24 Dusty Springfield songs was also issued bearing the logo of the musical in 2006, reaching number 71 on the Australian ARIA Albums Chart.
