= Pym (novel) =

Novel by Mat Johnson

- Book cover
- Author: Mat Johnson
- Language: English
- Genre: Fiction
- Publisher: Spiegel & Grau
- Publication date: March 1, 2011
- Publication place: United States
- Pages: 336
- ISBN: 978-0-8129-8158-2

Pym is the third novel by American author Mat Johnson, published on March 1, 2011. A satirical fantasy inspired by The Narrative of Arthur Gordon Pym of Nantucket, Edgar Allan Poe's only novel, the book explores racial politics and identity in America, and Antarctica. The novel was written over a period of nine years and has been well received by critics, who have praised its lighthearted and humorous style of social criticism.

== Development history ==
Pym takes its title from Edgar Allan Poe's The Narrative of Arthur Gordon Pym of Nantucket, "a strange tale of shipwrecks, mutiny and a mysterious island inhabited by black-skinned people whose teeth are even black, and it ends abruptly at the South Pole with Pym facing haunting white figures". Poe's only novel, it is the favorite book of Johnson's protagonist, Chris Jaynes, an African-American professor of literature, and his obsession with it leads him on his own journey to Antarctica.

According to Johnson, creating the book involved "9 years of writing, 16 drafts, [and] 3 deletion attempts". While working on Pym, Johnson also finished four critically acclaimed graphic novels – Hellblazer: Papa Midnite (2005), Incognegro (2008), Dark Rain: A New Orleans Story (2010), and Right State. In an interview with Mike Emery, Johnson stated that there were many times when he thought that Pym "was taking too much of my time, and it was taking me in the wrong direction". He credits his wife, journalist Meera Bowman Johnson (to whom he dedicated Pym), and friends with persuading him to continue with the novel.

Johnson's website features a list of books by other notable writers inspired by Poe's open-ended novel since its publication in 1838, including Herman Melville's Moby Dick, H. P. Lovecraft's At the Mountains of Madness, and Jules Verne's An Antarctic Mystery – "the most pragmatic and literal sequel to The Narrative of Arthur Gordon Pym and also the worst sequel […] Come for the novelty, stay for the unbridled racism". The narrative of Pym also includes elements from Verne's and Lovecraft's Poe-inspired works.

In Pym, Johnson's protagonist named a course on Poe he was teaching in reference to Toni Morrison's 1992 collection of essays Playing in the Dark: Whiteness and the Literary Imagination, in which she explores the theory that for Poe, whiteness equaled perfection. Professor Jaynes's course, "Dancing With the Darkies: Whiteness in the Literary Mind", attempted to trace the roots of America's failure to become a post-racial society to classic white texts, with a focus on Poe.

== Synopsis ==
Chris Jaynes is the only African-American professor of literature at a liberal Hudson Valley college. Refusing to limit his teaching to the African-American canon and serve on the college diversity committee, he is denied tenure. His obsession with Poe's novel comes to a head when his ancient book dealer introduces him to a copy of The True and Interesting Narrative of Dirk Peters. Coloured Man. As Written by Himself., "an unpublished 19th-century manuscript that suggests Poe's novel, which was partially set in Antarctica, was drawn closely from truth." Jaynes assembles an all-black mining crew, and embarks on an expedition to the South Pole in search of Poe's fabled island of Tsalal, the "great undiscovered African Diasporan homeland ... uncorrupted by whiteness."

The quest is led by the protagonist's older cousin Captain Booker Jaynes, "the world's only civil rights activist turned deep-sea diver", who is planning on mining blocks of Antarctic ice to melt and sell as expensive bottled water. Garth Frierson, Jaynes's childhood best friend with a fondness for Little Debbie snack cakes, joins the team in the hope of finding landscape painter Thomas Karvel, "Master of Light" (a parody of Thomas Kinkade, "Painter of Light"), and in part, Pym is laid out as "a road story/bromance between Jaynes and his childhood pal." Other members of the expedition include water treatment engineers Jeffree and Carlton Damon Carter, a gay couple documenting the trip for their "Afro-adventure blog." Angela Latham, a lawyer and Jaynes's "much-pined-for" ex-wife, brings along her new husband Nathaniel, treating the venture as a honeymoon. But instead of the black inhabitants described by Poe, Jaynes and his friends come across a prehistoric world of giant white people, called Snow Honkies or Tekelians. They also find Pym, who is somehow still alive after nearly 200 years. The Tekelians enslave the humans; Garth is the only one spared since he trades his Little Debbie snack cakes for freedom but does not have enough to free the rest of the mining crew.

For a number of days, Jaynes is forced to labor for his master Augustus by cleaning his ice cave and kneading krakt (the Tekelian word for whale blubber). Augustus eventually gestures to Jaynes that he wants Little Debbie cakes by showing him an empty wrapper, which leads them back to the campsite and Garth. Jaynes and Garth then plot an escape plan for the enslaved crew as Augustus eats out of a bag of sugar and eventually falls ill and vomits. Jaynes and Garth drag the Tekelian back to the mouth of the ice caves, where they secretly plan to meet with the others. After returning, Augustus (who is translated by Pym) drunkenly announces to Jaynes that he has been sold to Sausage Nose, an abusive master who owns both Jeffree and Carlton. Jaynes realizes that he must escape with the crew soon or they will be enslaved forever. He attempts to convince Booker Jaynes to escape with him and Garth, but fails to persuade him as Booker is in an intimate relationship with his mistress, Hunka. Jaynes manages to escape by himself to the mouth of the cave, but sees that both snowmobiles have been destroyed by Pym. Garth and Jaynes tie Pym up and begin to walk away from the ice caves with a ration of seasoned krakt from Booker as their own source of food. Garth unfortunately eats it all and leaves everyone to starve.

Jaynes and Garth wake up in a saturated paradise and are greeted by Thomas Karvel, the Master of Light, and his wife, Mrs. Karvel. They are given a tour of the Biodome and are given three-fifths of a home, and the Karvels agree to let them stay only if they raise crops in the plot of land they are given.

Because the Biodome uses so much energy, the heat from its machinery is melting the ice caves of the Tekelians. Both Pym and Nathaniel arrive with all of the Tekelians and attempt to persuade the Karvels into using less energy and relinquishing Jaynes and Garth, as they are property of Sausage Nose. Mrs. Karvel invites the Tekelians to a feast, which takes place on the rooftop of the Biodome. The mining crew (except Nathaniel), Jaynes, and Mrs. Karvel cook all of the remaining instant food, and cover the dessert with rat poison, calling them "sprinkles".

During the feast, Mrs. Karvel asks Jaynes to bring out more dessert, and Sausage Nose and a child follow him inside the Biodome. The child dies in a river from the rat poison, and Sausage Nose realizes the trick that is being played on the Tekelians. He charges at Jaynes and is killed by a gardening hoe to the head, courtesy of Garth. To avoid suspicions of Sausage Nose going missing, Jaynes forces Garth into a robe and smears toothpaste on his face and hands. The Tekelians discover that something is amiss and that Garth is not Sausage Nose at all. The Tekelians begin to attack the humans when the Biodome's boiler explodes, causing an earthquake to occur, killing all except Jaynes, Garth, and Pym.

The novel then becomes a number of journal entries about the journey to Tsalal by raft, in which Pym dies. Jaynes covers Pym's face with a black cloth, and they arrive at Tsalal, which is not an island of blackness, as Poe describes, but instead a place of color and most notably of people with brown skin.

== Reception ==
Pym has been well received by critics, with Kirkus Reviews referring to it as "an acutely humorous, very original story that will delight lovers of literature and fantasy alike" and NPR's Maureen Corrigan calling it "loony, disrespectful, and sharp" and "a welcome riff on the surrealistic shudder-fest that is Poe's original."

According to Associated Press writer Jennifer Kay, Pym is a swiftly paced satire which "skewers Edgar Allan Poe, race in America, the snack-food industry, academia, landscape painting and abominable snowmen." She concluded, "A commentary on racial identity, obsessions and literature should not be as funny as Pym, but Johnson makes light work of his heavy themes." Adam Mansbach, writing for The New York Times, similarly stated, "It's no easy task to balance social satire against life-threatening adventure, the allegory against the gory, but Johnson's hand is steady and his ability to play against Poe's text masterly."

Michael Dirda, for The Washington Post, called the novel "exuberantly comic", concluding that "in its seemingly effortless blend of the serious, comic and fantastic, Johnson's Pym really shouldn't be missed". Maggie Galehouse, book editor of the Houston Chronicle, called Pym "… funny. And erudite, without condescension", stating that while there is "no shortage of thought and scholarship and experience underpinning Pym", reading it "is like opening a big can of whoop-ass and then marveling – gleefully – at all the mayhem that ensues." Joe M. O'Connell, in the Austin American-Statesman, called Johnson "a wizard", stating that the novel cast a "magical spell", and described it as "a rumination on America's ongoing problem of race, and an excellent modern picaresque sprinkled liberally with comic book action. Most of all, it's a sublimely written comic novel and a lot of fun." Publishers Weekly, in a starred review, described Pym as a "high-concept adventure" which provides "a memorable take on America's 'racial pathology' and 'the whole ugly story of our world'".

== Awards and honors ==
- 2011 Salon Book Award (Fiction)
- Houston Chronicle – Best books of 2011
- The A.V. Club – The best books we read in 2011
- The Seattle Times – 32 of the year's best books
- The Washington Post – Notable Fiction of 2011
- Vanity Fair – The Best Books of 2011 You Haven't Read
