= Risë (given name) =

Risë is a feminine given name. It is the Americanized version of the Danish name Rise in which the umlaut is to preserve the pronunciation (/ˈriːsə/), which itself is derived from Regitza, a variant of Richiza. Notable people with the name include:

- Risë Stevens (1913–2013), American operatic mezzo-soprano
- Risë Wilson, American community organizer
