= The Narrative of Arthur Gordon Pym of Nantucket =

1838 novel by Edgar Allan Poe

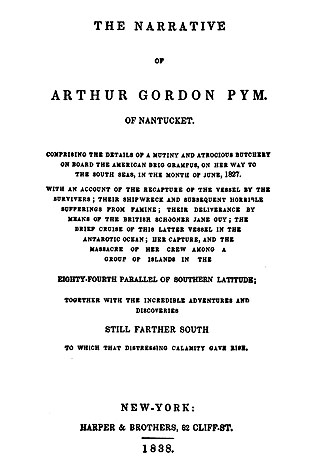
- Title page of the first book edition, Harper, New York (1838)
- Author: Edgar Allan Poe
- Language: English
- Publisher: Harper & Brothers
- Publication date: July 1838
- Publication place: United States

The Narrative of Arthur Gordon Pym of Nantucket, written and published in 1838, is the only complete novel by the American writer Edgar Allan Poe. The novel is set between 1827 and 1828 and relates the tale of the young Arthur Gordon Pym, who stows away aboard a whaler called the Grampus. Various adventures and misadventures befall Pym, including shipwreck, mutiny, and cannibalism, before he is saved by the crew of the Jane Guy. Aboard this vessel, Pym and a sailor named Dirk Peters continue their adventures farther south. Docking on land, they encounter hostile, black-skinned natives before escaping back to the ocean. The novel ends abruptly as Pym and Peters continue toward the South Pole.

The story starts out as a fairly conventional adventure at sea, but it becomes increasingly strange and hard to classify. Poe, who intended to present a realistic story, was inspired by several real-life accounts of sea voyages, and drew heavily from J. N. Reynolds and referenced the Hollow Earth theory. He also drew from his own experiences at sea. Analyses of the novel often focus on possible autobiographical elements as well as its portrayal of race and the symbolism in the final lines of the work.

Difficulty in finding literary success early in his short story-writing career inspired Poe to pursue writing a longer work. A few serialized installments of The Narrative of Arthur Gordon Pym of Nantucket were first published in the Southern Literary Messenger, though never completed. The full novel was published in July 1838 in one volume. Some critics responded negatively to the work for being too gruesome and for cribbing heavily from other works, while others praised its exciting adventures. Poe himself later called it "a very silly book". The novel later influenced Herman Melville, Jules Verne and H. P. Lovecraft.

== Plot summary ==
The book comprises a preface, 24 chapters, and a concluding note written in an unnamed editorial voice, with a total of around 72,000 words.

=== On board the Ariel (Chapter I) ===
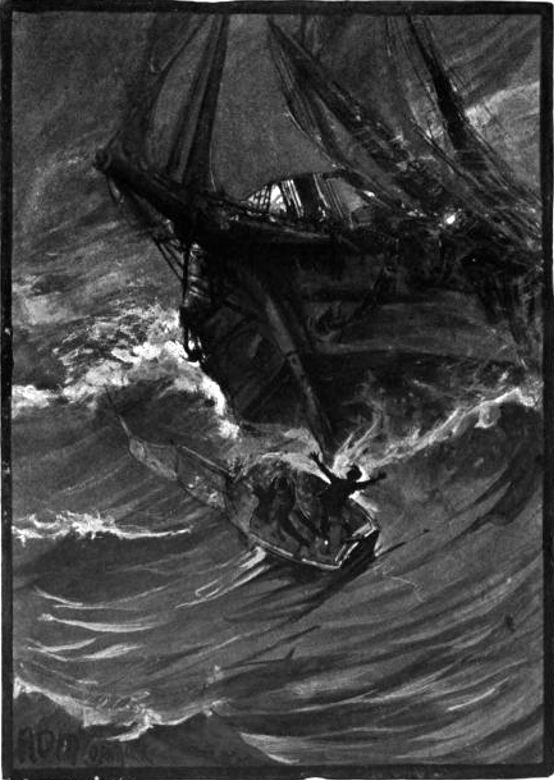
The first section of the novel features Pym's small boat being destroyed.

Arthur Gordon Pym was born on the island of Nantucket, famous for its fishing harbor and whaling. His best friend, Augustus Barnard, is the son of the captain of a whaling ship. One night, the two boys become drunk and decide, on Augustus's whim, to take advantage of the breeze and sail out on Pym's sailboat, the Ariel. The breeze, however, turns out to be the beginnings of a violent storm. The situation gets critical when Augustus passes out drunk, and the inexperienced Pym must take control of the dinghy. The Ariel is overtaken by the Penguin, a returning whaling ship. Against the captain's wishes, the crew of the Penguin turns back to search for and rescue both Augustus and Pym. After they are safely back on land, they decide to keep this episode a secret from their parents.

=== On board the Grampus (Chapters II – XIII) ===
His first ocean misadventure does not dissuade Pym from sailing again; rather, his imagination is ignited by the experience. His interest is further fueled by the tales of a sailor's life that Augustus tells him. Pym decides to follow Augustus as a stowaway aboard the Grampus, a whaling vessel commanded by Augustus's father that is bound for the southern seas. Augustus helps Pym by preparing a hideout in the hold for him and smuggling Tiger, Pym's faithful dog, on board. Augustus promises to provide Pym with water and food until the ship is too far from shore to return, at which time Pym will reveal himself.

Due to the stuffy atmosphere and vapors in the dark and cramped hold, Pym becomes increasingly comatose and delirious over the days. He can't communicate with Augustus, and the promised supplies fail to arrive, so Pym runs out of water. In the course of his ordeal, he discovers a letter written in blood attached to his dog Tiger, warning Pym to remain hidden, as his life depends on it.

Augustus finally sets Pym free, explaining the mysterious message, as well as his delay in retrieving his friend: a mutiny had erupted on the whaling ship. Part of the crew was slaughtered by the mutineers, while another group, including Augustus's father, were set adrift in a small boat. Augustus survived because he had befriended one of the mutineers, Dirk Peters, who now regrets his part in the uprising.

Peters, Pym, and Augustus hatch a plan to seize control of the ship: Pym, whose presence is unknown to the mutineers, will wait for a storm and then dress in the clothes of a recently dead sailor, masquerading as a ghost. In the confusion sure to break out among the superstitious sailors, Peters and Augustus, helped by Tiger, will take over the ship again. Everything goes according to plan, and soon the three men are masters of the Grampus: all the mutineers are killed or thrown overboard except one, Richard Parker, whom they spare to help them run the vessel. (At this point, the dog Tiger disappears from the novel; his unknown fate is a loose end in the narrative.)

The storm increases in force, breaking the mast, tearing the sails and flooding the hold. All four manage to survive by lashing themselves to the hull. As the storm abates, they find themselves safe for the moment, but without provisions. Over the following days, the men face death by starvation and thirst.

They sight an erratically moving Dutch ship with a grinning red-capped seaman on deck, nodding in apparent greeting as they approach. Initially delighted with the prospect of deliverance, they quickly become horrified as they are overcome with an awful stench. They soon realize that the apparently cheerful sailor is, in fact, a corpse propped up in the ship's rigging, his "grin" a result of his partially decomposed skull moving as a seagull feeds upon it. As the ship passes, it becomes clear that all its occupants are rotting corpses.

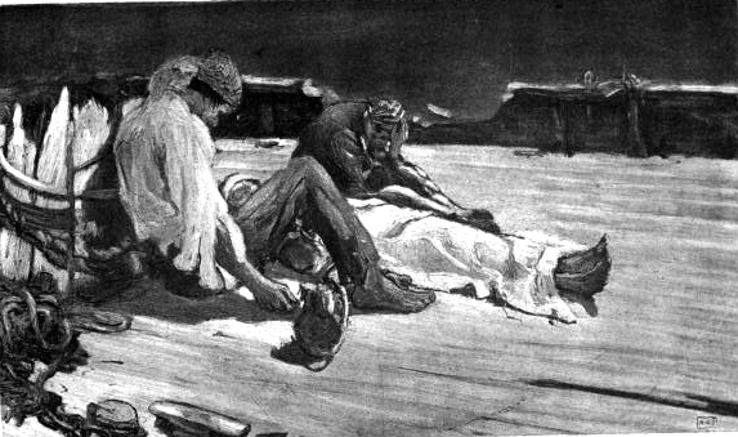
Illustration of the death of Augustus by Albert Sterner, 1895

As time passes, with no sign of land or other ships, Parker suggests that one of them should be killed as food for the others. They draw straws and Parker is sacrificed. This gives the others a reprieve, but Augustus soon dies from wounds received when they reclaimed the Grampus, and several more storms batter the already badly damaged ship. Pym and Peters float on the upturned hull and are close to death when they are rescued by the Jane Guy, a ship out of Liverpool.

=== On board the Jane Guy (Chapters XIV – XXII) ===
On the Jane Guy, Pym and Peters become part of the crew and join the ship on its expedition to hunt sea calves and seals for fur, and to explore the southern oceans. Pym studies the islands around the Cape of Good Hope, becoming interested in the social structures of penguins, albatrosses, and other sea birds. Upon his urging, the captain agrees to sail farther south towards the unexplored Antarctic regions.

The ship crosses an ice barrier and arrives in open sea, close to the South Pole, albeit with a mild climate. Here the Jane Guy comes upon a mysterious island called Tsalal, inhabited by a tribe of black, apparently friendly natives led by a chief named Too-Wit. The color white is alien to the island's inhabitants and unnerves them, because nothing of that color exists there. Even the natives' teeth are black. The island is also home to many undiscovered species of flora and fauna. Its water is also different from water elsewhere, being strangely thick and exhibiting multicolored veins.

The natives' relationship with the sailors is initially cordial, so Too-Wit and the captain begin trading. Their friendliness, however, turns out to be a ruse and on the eve of the ship's proposed departure, the natives ambush the crew in a narrow gorge. Everyone except Pym and Peters is slaughtered, and the Jane Guy is overrun and burned by the malevolent tribe.

=== Tsalal and farther south (Chapters XXIII – XXIV) ===
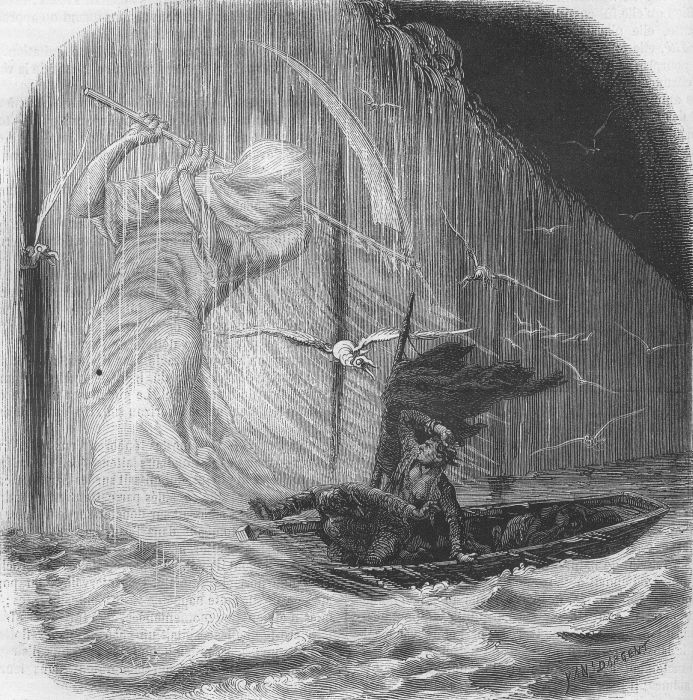
1864 illustration by Frédéric Lix and Yan' Dargent

Pym and Peters hide in the mountains surrounding the site of the ambush. They discover a labyrinth of passages in the hills with strange marks on the walls, and disagree about whether these are the result of artificial or natural causes. Facing a shortage of food, they make a desperate run and steal a pirogue from the natives, narrowly escaping from the island and taking one of its inhabitants prisoner.

The small boat drifts farther south on a current of increasingly warm water, which has become milky white in color. After several days they encounter a rain of ashes and then observe a huge cataract of fog or mist, which splits open to accommodate their entrance upon approach. The native dies as a huge shrouded white figure appears before them. The first English edition (London: Wiley and Putnam, October 1838) omitted the final diary entry for March 22 describing the death and the white figure.

Here the novel ends abruptly. A short post-scriptural note, ostensibly written by the book's editors, explains that Pym was killed in an accident and speculates his final two or three chapters were lost with him, though assuring the public the chapters will be restored to the text if found. The note further explains that Peters is alive in Illinois but cannot be interviewed at present. The editors then compare the shapes of the labyrinth and the wall marks noted by Pym to Arabian and Egyptian letters and hieroglyphs with meanings of "Shaded", "White", and "Region to the South".

== Sources ==
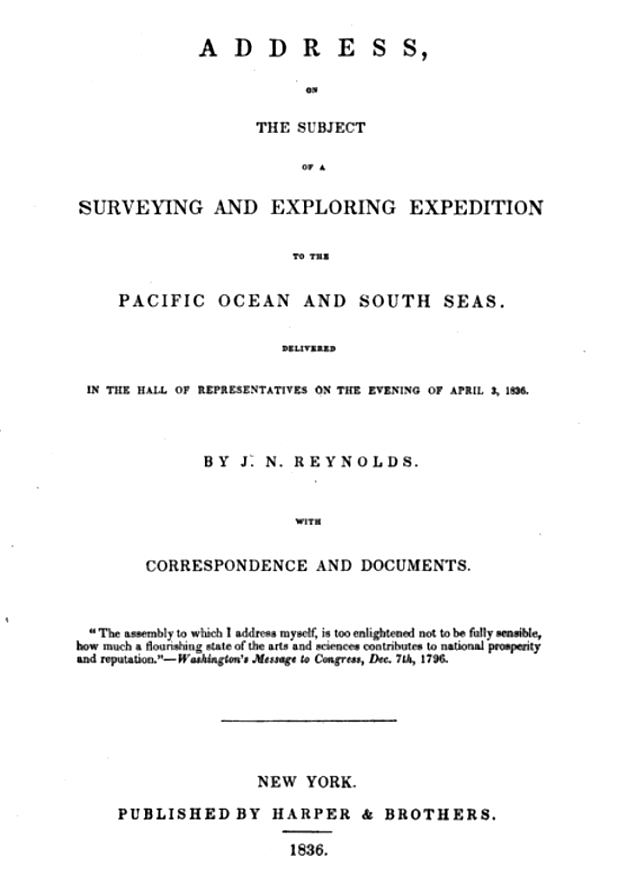
Address on the Subject of a Surveying and Exploring Expedition to the Pacific Ocean and the South Seas (1836) by explorer J. N. Reynolds was a heavy influence on Poe's novel.

In order to present the tale as an authentic exploration, Poe drew from contemporary travel journals. Poe's most significant source was the explorer J. N. Reynolds, whose work Address on the Subject of a Surveying and Exploring Expedition to the Pacific Ocean and the South Seas was reviewed favorably by Poe in January 1837. Poe used about 700 words of Reynolds' address in Chapter XVI, almost half the length of the chapter. In 1843, Poe also praised Reynolds in a review of A Brief Account of the Discoveries and Results of the United States' Exploring Expedition printed in Graham's Magazine. It is unknown whether Poe and Reynolds ever met. Shortly before Poe's mysterious death, he is said to have called out the name "Reynolds" in his delirium. If true, this may have reflected the influence of J. N. Reynolds.

In a footnote to Chapter XIII, Poe refers to the Polly, a wreck which drifted for six months across the Atlantic Ocean in 1811–1812. Poe probably read this history in an 1836 book by R. Thomas, Remarkable Events and Remarkable Shipwrecks, from which he quotes verbatim.

In Chapter XVI, Poe recounts Captain James Cook's circumnavigation of the globe aboard the Resolution that reached 70°10′ latitude. He also drew from A Narrative of Four Voyages (1832), an account by Benjamin Morrell that became a bestseller. A Narrative of Four Voyages may have given Poe the idea of the summarized title of his novel. Poe may have used these real-life accounts in an attempt to hoax his readers into believing the novel was an autobiographical narrative by Pym.

In addition to historical sources, Poe was influenced by fiction writers. The Rime of the Ancient Mariner by Samuel Taylor Coleridge was a general influence, and scenes of Pym and Dirk Peters in a cave echo scenes in Daniel Defoe's Robinson Crusoe, which many reviewers noted at the time, including London publications such as the Court Gazette and the Torch. The ship of corpses recalls the legend of the Flying Dutchman, a ship which is cursed and unable to return home. The more gruesome and psychological elements may have been drawn from Logan by John Neal, whom Poe considered "first, or at all events second, among our men of indisputable genius".

Poe also incorporated the theories of Reynolds and John Cleves Symmes Jr. on the Hollow Earth. The theory of these works was that a hole at the South Pole led to the interior of the planet, where undiscovered civilizations prospered. As Symmes wrote, the earth was "hollow, habitable, and widely open about the poles". This theory, which he presented as early as 1818, was taken seriously throughout the nineteenth century. Symmes' theory had already served Poe when he wrote, in 1831, "MS. Found in a Bottle", based partly on Symmes' Theory of the Concentric Spheres, published in 1826. "MS. Found in a Bottle" is similar to Poe's novel in setting, characterization, and some elements of plot. Other writers who later fictionalized this theory include Edgar Rice Burroughs and L. Frank Baum.

In describing life on a long sea voyage, Poe also drew from personal experience. In 1815, a six-year-old Poe along with his foster-parents traveled from Norfolk, Virginia to Liverpool, England, a journey of 34 days. During the difficult trip, young Poe asked his foster father, John Allan, to include him in a letter he was writing. Allan wrote, "Edgar says Pa say something for me, say I was not afraid of the sea." The family returned to the United States in 1820 aboard the Martha and docked in New York after 31 days. Closer to the time Poe wrote his novel, he had sailed during his military career, the longest trip being from Boston to Charleston, South Carolina.

== Analysis ==
The Narrative of Arthur Gordon Pym of Nantucket has defied a universally accepted interpretation. Scholar Scott Peeples wrote that it is "at once a mock nonfictional exploration narrative, adventure saga, bildungsroman, hoax, largely plagiarized travelogue, and spiritual allegory" and "one of the most elusive major texts of American literature." Biographer James M. Hutchisson writes that the plot both "soars to new heights of fictional ingenuity and descends to new lows of silliness and absurdity".

One reason for the confusion comes from many continuity errors throughout the novel. For example, Pym notes that breaking a bottle while trapped in the hold saved his life because the sound alerted Augustus to his presence while searching. However, Pym notes that Augustus did not tell him this until "many years elapsed", even though Augustus is dead eight chapters later. Nevertheless, much of the novel is carefully plotted. Novelist John Barth notes, for example, that the midway point of the novel occurs when Pym reaches the equator, the midway point of the globe.

Scholar Shawn Rosenheim believes that the use of hieroglyphs in the novel served as a precursor to Poe's interest in cryptography. The pictographs themselves were likely inspired by The Kentuckian in New-York (1834) by William Alexander Caruthers, where similar writing is the work of a black slave. Unlike the previous sea-voyage tales that Poe had written, such as "MS. Found in a Bottle", Pym is undertaking this trip on purpose. It has been suggested that the journey is about establishing a national American identity as well as discovering a personal identity.

Poe also presents the effects of alcohol in the novel. The opening episode, for example, shows that intoxicated people can sometimes seem entirely sober and then, suddenly, the effects of alcohol show through. Such a depiction is a small version of a larger focus in the novel on contradictions between chaos and order. Even nature seems unnatural. Water, for example, is very different at the end of the novel, appearing either colorful or "unnaturally clear."

=== Autobiographical elements ===
Elements of the novel are often read as autobiographical. The novel begins with Arthur Gordon Pym, a name similar to Edgar Allan Poe, departing from Edgartown, Massachusetts, on Martha's Vineyard. Interpreted this way, the protagonist is actually sailing away from himself, or his ego. The middle name of "Gordon", in replacing Poe's connection to the Allan family, was turned into a reference to George Gordon Byron, a poet whom Poe deeply admired. The scene where Pym disguises himself from his grandfather while noting that he intends to inherit wealth from him also indicates a desire for Poe to free himself from family obligation and, specifically, scorning the patrimony of his foster-father John Allan.

Dates are also relevant to this autobiographical reading. According to the text, Pym arrives at the island of Tsalal on January 19—Poe's birthday. Some scholars, including Burton R. Pollin and Richard Wilbur, suggest that the character of Augustus was based on Poe's childhood friend Ebenezer Burling; others argue he represents Poe's brother William Henry Leonard Poe, who served in South America and elsewhere as a sailor aboard the USS Macedonian. In the novel, the date of Augustus's death corresponds to that of the death of Poe's brother. The first chapter features Pym's sloop named the Ariel, the name of a character once played by Poe's mother Eliza Poe, and also the name of Percy Bysshe Shelley's boat, on which he died, originally named Don Juan in honor of Lord Byron.

=== Race ===
One thread of critical analysis of this tale focuses on the possibly racist implications of Poe's plot and imagery. One such plot element is the black cook who leads the mutiny on the Grampus and is its most bloodthirsty participant. Dirk Peters, a man of mixed white and Native American ancestry, is described as having a ferocious appearance, with long, protruding teeth, bowed legs, and a bald head like "the head of most negroes." The brilliant whiteness of the final figure in the novel contrasts with the dark-skinned savages and such a contrast may call to mind the escalating racial tensions over the question of slavery in the United States as Poe was writing the novel.

Additionally, the novel drew from prevalent assumptions during the time that dark-skinned people were inherently inferior. One critic of the use of race in The Narrative of Arthur Gordon Pym of Nantucket is Toni Morrison. In her 1992 book Playing in the Dark: Whiteness and the Literary Imagination, Morrison discusses how the Africanist presence in the novel is used as an "Other" against which the author defines "white", "free", and "individual". In her explorations of the depiction of African characters in white American literature, Morrison writes that "no early American writer is more important to the concept of American Africanism than Poe" because of the focus on the symbolism of black and white in Poe's novel. This possible racial symbolism is explored further in Mat Johnson's satirical fantasy Pym (2011).

=== Ending ===
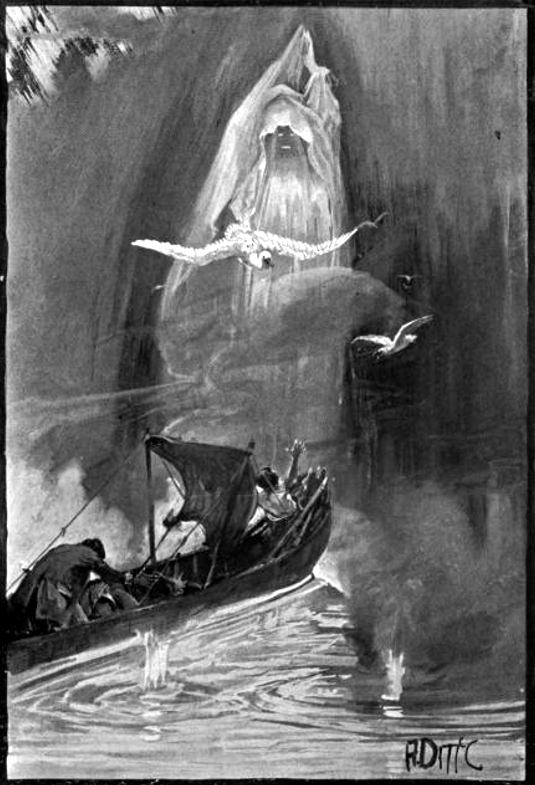
"There arose in our pathway a shrouded human figure", 1898 illustration by A. D. McCormick

The novel ends abruptly with the sudden appearance of a bizarre enshrouded figure having skin hued "of the perfect whiteness of the snow." Many readers were left unsatisfied by this ending because, as Poe relative and scholar Harry Lee Poe wrote, "it didn't match the kind of clear ending they expected from a novel." Poe may have purposely left the ending subject to speculation. Some scholars have suggested that the ending serves as a symbolic conclusion to Pym's spiritual journey and others suggest that Pym has actually died in this scene, as though his tale is somehow being told posthumously. Alternatively, Pym may die in the retelling of the story at precisely the same point he should have died during the actual adventure. Like other characters in works by Poe, Pym seems to submit willingly to this fate, whatever it is. Kenneth Silverman notes that the figure radiates ambivalence and it is not clear if it is a symbol of destruction or of protection.

The chasms that open throughout the sea in the final moments of the book derive from the Hollow Earth theory. The area closest to the Pole is also, surprisingly, warm rather than cold, as Symmes believed. Symmes also believed there were civilizations inside this Hollow Earth and the enshrouded figure who appears at the end may indicate one such civilization near the Pole.

== Composition and publication history ==
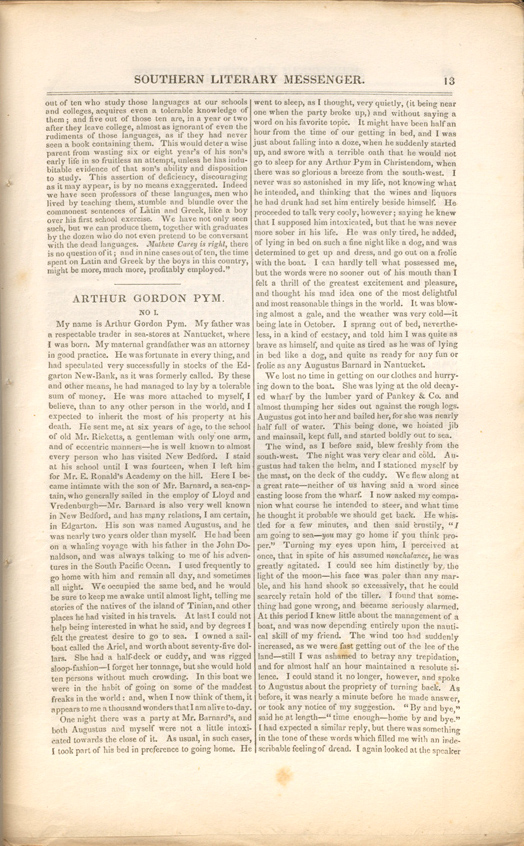
The first installment of a serialized version of The Narrative of Arthur Gordon Pym of Nantucket was published in the Southern Literary Messenger in January 1837.

Poe had intended to collect a number of his early short stories into a volume titled Tales of the Folio Club in the 1830s. The collection would be unified as a series of tales presented by members of a literary association based on the Delphian Club, designed as burlesque of contemporary literary criticism. Poe had previously printed several of these stories in the Philadelphia Saturday Courier and the Baltimore Saturday Visiter.

An editor, James Kirke Paulding, tried to assist him in publishing this collection. However, Paulding reported back to Poe that the publishers at Harper & Brothers declined the collection, saying that readers were looking for simple, long works like novels. They suggested, "if he will lower himself a little to the ordinary comprehension of the generality of readers, and prepare... a single work... they will make such arrangements with him as will be liberal and satisfactory." They suggested "if other engagements permit... undertake a Tale in a couple volumes, for that is the magical number." The response from Harper & Brothers inspired Poe to begin a long work and began writing The Narrative of Arthur Gordon Pym of Nantucket. Poe arranged with his boss at the Southern Literary Messenger to publish his novel in several serialized installments at a pay rate of $3 per page.

However, Poe retired from his role at the Messenger on January 3, 1837, as the installments were being published; some scholars suggest he was fired and this led him to abandoning the novel. His split with the Messenger began a "blank period" where he did not publish much and suffered from unemployment, poverty, and no success in his literary pursuits. Poe soon realized writing a book-length narrative was a necessary career decision, partly because he had no steady job and the economy was suffering from the Panic of 1837. He also set part of the story as a quest to Antarctica to capitalize the public's sudden interest in that topic.

After his marriage to Virginia Clemm, Poe spent the following winter and spring completing his manuscript for this novel in New York. He earned a small amount of money by taking in a boarder named William Gowans. During his fifteen months in New York, amidst the harsh economic climate, Poe published only two tales, "Von Jung, the Mystific" and "Siope. A Fable". Harper & Brothers announced Poe's novel would be published in May 1837, but the Panic forced them to delay.

The novel was finally published in book form under the title The Narrative of Arthur Gordon Pym of Nantucket in July 1838, although it did not include Poe's name and was instead presented as an account by Pym himself. Poe excused the earlier serialized version by noting that the Messenger had mistakenly adapted it "under the garb of fiction". Its full subtitle was:

Comprising the Details of Mutiny and Atrocious Butchery on Board the American Brig Grampus, on Her Way to the South Seas, in the Month of June, 1827. With an Account of the Recapture of the Vessel by the Survivers; Their Shipwreck and Subsequent Horrible Sufferings from Famine; Their Deliverance by Means of the British Schooner Jane Guy; the Brief Cruise of this Latter Vessel in the Atlantic Ocean; Her Capture, and the Massacre of Her Crew Among a Group of Islands in the Eighty-Fourth Parallel of Southern Latitude; Together with the Incredible Adventures and Discoveries Still Farther South to Which That Distressing Calamity Gave Rise.

The first overseas publication of The Narrative of Arthur Gordon Pym of Nantucket appeared only a few months later when it was printed in London without Poe's permission, although the final paragraph was omitted. This early publication of the novel initiated British interest in Poe.

== Literary significance and reception ==
Contemporary reviews for The Narrative of Arthur Gordon Pym of Nantucket were generally unfavorable. Fifteen months after its publication, it was reviewed by Lewis Gaylord Clark, a fellow author who carried on a substantial feud with Poe. His review printed in The Knickerbocker said the book was "told in a loose and slip-shod style, seldom chequered by any of the more common graces of composition." Clark went on, "This work is one of much interest, with all its defects, not the least of which is that it is too liberally stuffed with 'horrid circumstances of blood and battle.'"

Many reviewers commented on the excess of violent scenes. In addition to noting the novel's gruesome details, a review in Burton's Gentleman's Magazine (possibly William Evans Burton himself) criticized its borrowed descriptions of geography and errors in nautical information. The reviewer considered it a literary hoax and called it an "impudent attempt at humbugging the public" and regretted "Mr. Poe's name in connexion with such a mass of ignorance and effrontery". Poe later wrote to Burton that he agreed with the review, saying it "was essentially correct" and the novel was "a very silly book".

Other reviews condemned the attempt at presenting a true story. A reviewer for the Metropolitan Magazine noted that, though the story was good as fiction, "when palmed upon the public as a true thing, it cannot appear in any other light than that of a bungling business—an impudent attempt at imposing on the credulity of the ignorant." Nevertheless, some readers believed portions of Poe's novel were true, especially in England, and justified the absurdity of the book with an assumption that author Pym was exaggerating the truth. Publisher George Putnam later noted that "whole columns of these new 'discoveries', including the hieroglyphics (sic) found on the rocks, were copied by many of the English country papers as sober historical truth."

In contrast, 20th-century Argentine writer Jorge Luis Borges, who admitted Poe as a strong influence, praised the novel as "Poe's greatest work". He later included one of the species invented for the story in his dictionary of fantastical creatures, the Book of Imaginary Beings, in a chapter titled "an animal dreamt by Poe". H. G. Wells noted that "Pym tells what a very intelligent mind could imagine about the south polar region a century ago". Even so, most scholars did not engage in much serious discussion or analysis of the novel until the 1950s, though many in France recognized the work much earlier. In 2013, The Guardian cited The Narrative of Arthur Gordon Pym of Nantucket as one of the 100 best novels written in English, and noted its influence on later authors such as Henry James, Arthur Conan Doyle, B. Traven and David Morrell.

The financial and critical failure of The Narrative of Arthur Gordon Pym of Nantucket was a turning point in Poe's career. For one, he was driven to literary duties that would make him money, notably his controversial role as editor of The Conchologist's First Book in April 1839. He also wrote a short series called "Literary Small Talk" for a new Baltimore-based magazine called American Museum of Science, Literature and the Arts.

In need of work, Poe accepted a job at the low salary of $10 per week as assistant editor for Burton's Gentleman's Magazine, despite their negative review of his novel. He also returned to his focus on short stories rather than longer works of prose; Poe's next published book after this, his only completed novel, was the collection Tales of the Grotesque and Arabesque in 1840.

== Influence and legacy ==
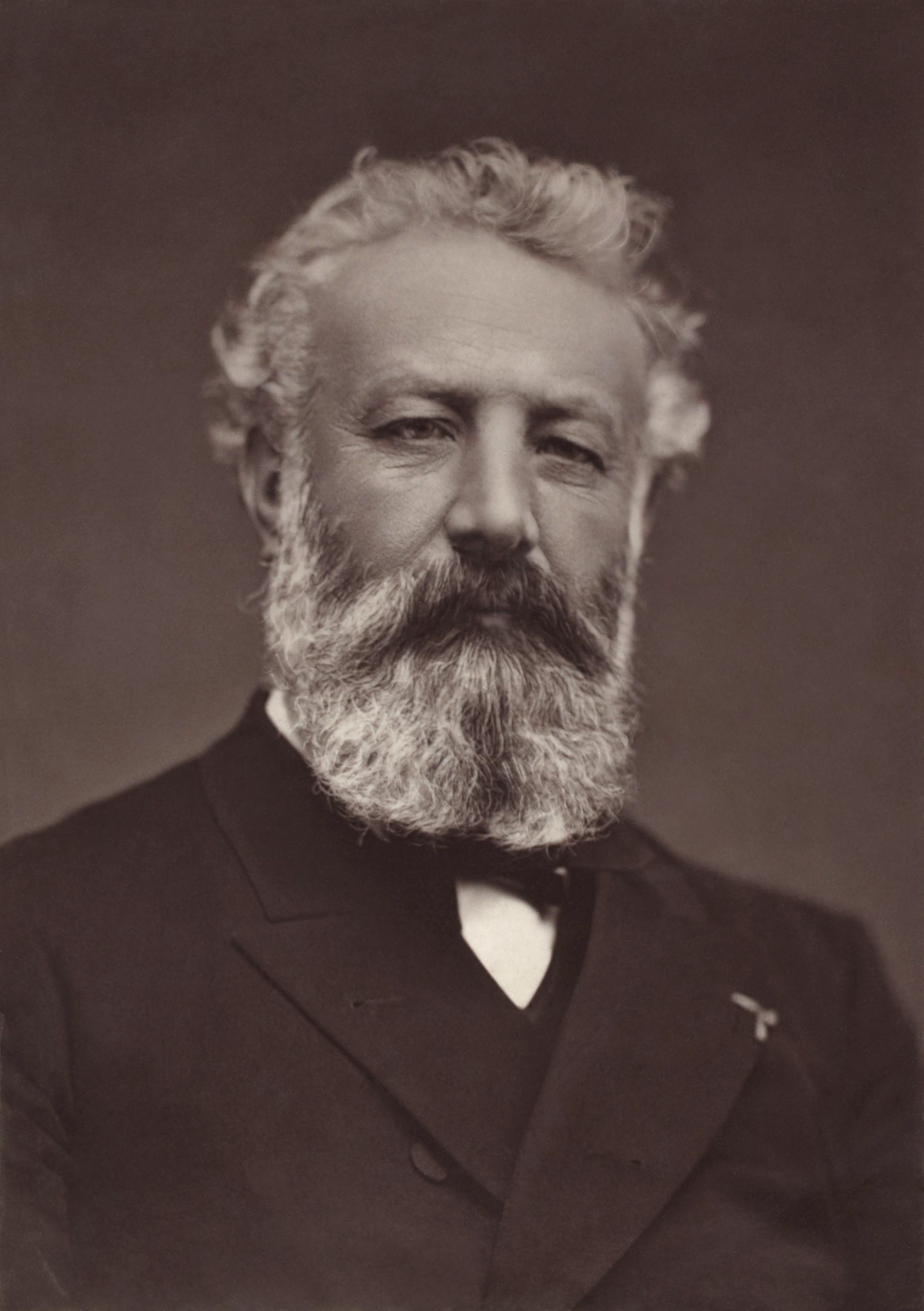
Poe's novel inspired later writers, including Jules Verne.

=== 19th century ===
Scholars, including Patrick F. Quinn and John J. McAleer, have noted parallels between Herman Melville's Moby-Dick and The Narrative of Arthur Gordon Pym of Nantucket and other Poe works. Quinn noted that there were enough similarities that Melville must have studied Poe's novel and, if not, it would be "one of the most extraordinary accidents in literature". McAleer noted that Poe's short story "The Fall of the House of Usher" inspired "Ahab's flawed character" in Moby-Dick. Scholar Jack Scherting also noted similarities between Moby-Dick and Poe's "MS. Found in a Bottle".

The Narrative of Arthur Gordon Pym of Nantucket became one of Poe's most-translated works; by 1978, scholars had counted over 300 editions, adaptations, and translations. This novel has proven to be particularly influential in France. French poet and author Charles Baudelaire translated the novel in 1857 as Les Aventures d'Arthur Gordon Pym. Baudelaire was also inspired by Poe's novel in his own poetry. "Voyage to Cythera" rewrites part of Poe's scene where birds eat human flesh.

French author Jules Verne greatly admired Poe and wrote a study, Edgar Poe et ses œuvres, in 1864. Poe's story "Three Sundays in a Week" may have inspired Verne's novel Around the World in Eighty Days (1873). In 1897, Verne published a sequel to The Narrative of Arthur Gordon Pym of Nantucket called An Antarctic Mystery. Like Poe's novel, Verne attempted to present an imaginative work of fiction as a believable story by including accurate factual details.

An informal sequel to The Narrative of Arthur Gordon Pym of Nantucket is the 1899 novel A Strange Discovery by Charles Romeyn Dake, where the narrator, Doctor Bainbridge, recounts the story his patient Dirk Peters told him of his journey with Gordon Pym in Antarctica, including a discussion of Poe's poem "The Raven".

=== 20th century ===
Poe's novel was also an influence on H. P. Lovecraft, whose 1936 novel At the Mountains of Madness follows similar thematic direction and borrows the cry tekeli-li or takkeli from the novel. Chaosium's role-playing adventure Beyond the Mountains of Madness (1999), a sequel to Lovecraft's novel, includes a "missing ending" of Poe's novel, in which Pym encounters some of Lovecraft's creatures at their Antarctic city.

Georges Perec's 1969 novel A Void, notable for not containing a single letter e, contains an e-less rewriting of Poe's "The Raven" that is attributed to Arthur Gordon Pym in order to avoid using the two es found in Poe's name.

On May 5, 1974, author and journalist Arthur Koestler published a letter from reader Nigel Parker in The Sunday Times of a striking coincidence between a scene in Poe's novel and an actual event that happened decades later: In 1884, the yacht Mignonette sank, with four men cast adrift. After weeks without food, they decided that one of them should be sacrificed as food for the other three, just as in Poe's novel. The loser was a young cabin boy named Richard Parker, coincidentally the same name as Poe's fictional character. Parker's shipmates, Tom Dudley and Edwin Stephens, were later tried for murder in a precedent-setting English common law trial, the renowned R v Dudley and Stephens.

In a 1988 Young All-Stars comic book written by Roy and Dann Thomas, Arthur Gordon Pym is a 19th-century explorer who discovered the lost Arctic civilization of the alien Dyzan. Pym goes on to become Jules Verne's Captain Nemo, eventually sinking the RMS Titanic. This story also uses elements of Edward Bulwer-Lytton's 1871 novel Vril.

=== 21st century ===
Yann Martel named a character in his Booker Prize-winning novel Life of Pi (2001) after Poe's fictional character, Richard Parker. Mat Johnson's 2011 novel Pym, a satirical fantasy exploring racial politics in the United States, draws its inspiration from The Narrative of Arthur Gordon Pym of Nantucket, and closely models the original.
