= Incognegro (disambiguation) =

Incognegro is an album by Ludacris.

Incognegro may also refer to:

- Incognegro (comics), a 2008 graphic novel by Mat Johnson and Warren Pleece
- Incognegro: A Memoir of Exile and Apartheid, a 2008 memoir by Frank B. Wilderson III

== See also ==
- Passing (racial identity)
