= Roland Wiggins =

American music theorist (1932–2019)

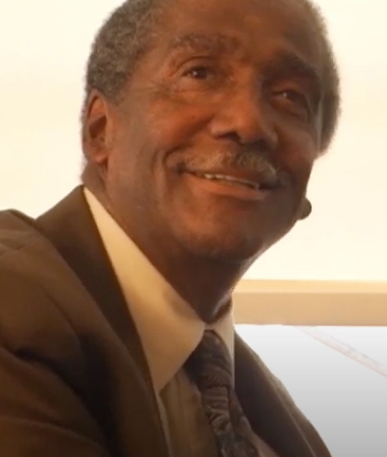

Background information
- Born: 15 April 1932; Ocean City, New Jersey, U.S
- Died: 20 November 2019 (aged 87) Charlottesville, Virginia, U.S
- Genres: Jazz
- Occupations: Musician; music theorist; logician
- Instrument: Piano
- Years active: 1940–2019

Roland Arlington Wiggins (April 15, 1932 – November 20, 2019) was an American music theorist and educator. His many students included John Coltrane, Thelonious Monk, Yusef Lateef, Sonny Fortune, Barry Harris, Archie Shepp, Buster Williams, Jimmy Owens, and Billy Taylor.

== Early life ==
Wiggins was born in Ocean City, New Jersey, on April 15, 1932, where he began studying piano at 8 years old. In 1949, he moved to Philadelphia where he continued his music studies. In 1950, he joined the Air Force, serving and playing with trumpeter Donald Byrd. He married his wife Muriel Dockery Wiggins on November 3, 1956, with whom he had three daughters, Rosalyn Cowell in 1957, Suzan Elaine in 1959, and Carol Melissa in 1966.

In high school, Wiggins studied at the Philadelphia Conservatory of Music, including studying with Vincent Persichetti, a classical composer, author, and Juilliard School of Music faculty member. Wiggins went on to study at the Combs College of Music, where after about a week he was invited to be a member of the faculty, and where he earned his doctoral degree in music. He then moved to New York where he studied with American composer and theorist Henry Cowell and in 1961 became an authorized instructor of the Schillinger System of Musical Composition.

== Later career ==
Wiggins moved to Massachusetts to be the director of the Center for the Study of Aesthetics in Education at the University of Massachusetts Amherst (1971–1973), and subsequently became an Associate Professor of Music at Hampshire College (1979–1986). In 1989, Hampshire College named a building after Wiggins, the Lebrón-Wiggins-Pran Cultural Center. In 1989, Wiggins moved to Charlottesville, Virginia where he was the director of the Luther P. Jackson Cultural Center at the University of Virginia.

== Music theory ==
Wiggins defined music theory as a combination of the study of syntax, semantics, and kinesthetics. Syntax covers the rules of Western tonal music in the categories of melody, harmony, and rhythm. Semantics is the emotional content and musical mood brought to music. Kinesthetics is the physical relationship to an instrument and the muscular ability to play the instrument. The focus of his teaching was on syntax. He wanted his students to understand the traditional rules of melodic motion, how notes are arranged, harmonic progression, and rhythmic structure, sometimes called "inside theory". Once the student fully understands inside theory, he or she can progress to "outside theory", which breaks the rules of "inside theory" in consistent and logical ways.

To emphasize the importance of understanding how syntax rules are applied and to encourage students to improve their approach to learning in general, he would also teach symbolic logic in his music theory classes. He was a member of the Association for Symbolic Logic. He was fond of saying that syntax was largely about sets of things and their behaviors, for example the set of active tones in a chord and the ways in which they can resolve.

He developed his own theory which he called the "atonal method". The atonal method is a theory based on consistently breaking the rules of Western tonal music, and draws on the work of Joseph Schillinger. In class, students sometimes got the opportunity to hear him apply his atonal method. He would demonstrate a principle of melodic motion or harmonic movement. He'd play on the piano a beautiful "inside" piece (usually a jazz standard) while telling students how he was following melodic and harmonic rules. Then he'd play the same piece "inside out". He would literally break all the rules he'd just demonstrated, but not randomly, always with consistency and applied logic.

He was fond of encouraging his students to get rid of their teachers and to become their own theorists. He would point out that most great musicians are their own theorists and that greatness is a realization of a tendency.

== Students ==
A video tribute to Wiggins titled, "The Music Within: Reflecting on the Innovation and Inspiration of Dr. Roland Wiggins" includes memories from some of his students and friends, including Randy Weston, Yusef Lateef, Sonny Fortune, Barry Harris, Archie Shepp, Jimmy Owens, and Billy Taylor. Archie Shepp speaks of how he asked Wiggins to teach some of his own classes, while Shepp sat in to listen and learn like the rest of the students. Barry Harris calls him the most important music theorist in America.

Yusef Lateef introduced Wiggins to John Coltrane in New York in the 1960s. After recording his album A Love Supreme, Coltrane called Wiggins to say that he was not too happy about some things he was doing which he thought were musical clichés. Wiggins replied saying, "John, they're yours". In other words, that by applying Coltrane's own musicality, his own syntax, semantics, and kinesthetics, to these things he thought were "clichés" they had instead become Coltrane's own. Wiggins also encouraged Coltrane to give himself credit for the mastery that he'd already developed and the contributions he'd already made to music. The theory discussion they had on that call influenced the direction of the later work of Coltrane, including his album Interstellar Space.

=== Doctoral dissertations by students of Roland Wiggins ===
- Bill Barron, 1975: Improvisation and related concepts in aesthetic education.
- Billy Taylor, 1975: The history and development of jazz piano : a new perspective for educators.
- Yusef Lateef, 1975: An over-view of western and Islamic education.

== Virginia House Joint Resolution ==
Following his death on November 20, 2019, the Virginia state legislature introduced on March 2, 2020 House Joint Resolution 419 to recognize and celebrate Wiggins's achievements.

== Personal life ==
Wiggins married Muriel Dockery (1932–2023) in 1956. They had three children, including author and scholar Rosalyn W. Berne.
