= Rosalyn W. Berne =

American scholar and author

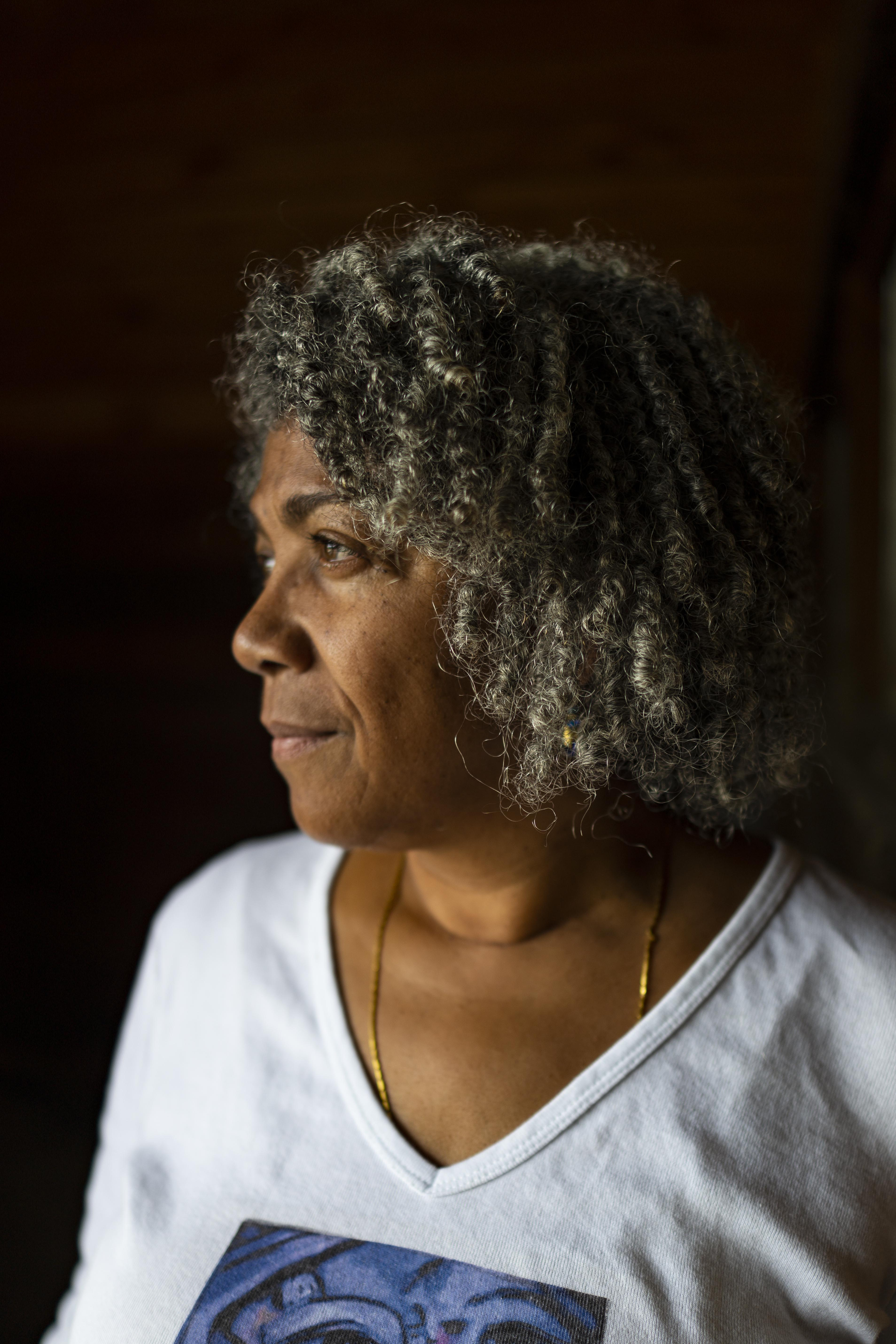
- Rosalyn W. Berne in 2016
- Born: New York, United States
- Scientific career
- Fields: Ethics in engineering, Science and new technologies
- Institutions: University of Virginia
- Thesis: Listening to their Voices: Meaning-Making and Liminality in Contemporary Adolescence
- Doctoral advisor: James C. Childress
- Website: https://engineering.virginia.edu/faculty/rosalyn-w-berne

Rosalyn W. Berne (née Wiggins) is an American scholar, author, and the Anne Shirley Carter Olsson Professor of Applied Ethics at the University of Virginia. Her research focuses on ethics in engineering, science, nanotechnologies and engineering education. She currently serves as the director of the Online Ethics Center for Engineering and Science.

== Biography ==
=== Early life ===
Rosalyn W. Berne was born in New York State, then moved with her parents to Philadelphia where she spent her childhood in a Quaker-founded residential community. Her father was Roland A. Wiggins.

=== Education ===
After receiving primary education at Greene Street Friends School, her family moved to Amherst, Massachusetts, where she attended Amherst Regional High School.

She then initiated studies at what was then Hampton Institute, before graduating with a B.A. and M.A. in Communication Studies, as well as a PhD in Religious Studies and Bioethics, all from the University of Virginia.

=== Works ===
Berne's research focuses on the intersections of emerging technologies, science, fiction, and myth, as well as the connections between the human and non-human worlds. Her research and writing interests include engineering ethics, biotechnology and nanotechnology, and engineering education ethics.

As an author, she has published academic and non-academic books on topics such as engineering ethics, science fiction as well as animal communication, notably relating to the equine world.

== Awards and honors ==
In 2021, Berne was appointed Anne Shirley Carter Olsson Professor of Applied Ethics, School of Engineering and Applied Sciences, at the University of Virginia. In 2018 and 2020, she was appointed Principal Investigator on research awards made to the National Academy of Engineering from the National Science Foundation (NSF) for her work related to the Online Ethics Center. In 2023, she received a NSF grant renewable to expand the Online Ethics Center to a community of practice. In 2002, Berne was awarded a Career Award: Ethics and Belief Inside the Development of Nanotechnologies by the American NSF.

She has also received awards for her books Waking to Beauty and When the Horses Whisper.

== Publications ==
=== Books ===
==== Academic works ====
- Berne, Rosalyn W. (31 August 2005). Nanotalk: Conversations with Scientists and Engineers About Ethics, Meaning, and Belief in the Development of Nanotechnology. Lawrence Erlbaum. ISBN 9780805848106.
- Berne, Rosalyn W. (19 December 2014). Creating Life from Life: Biotechnology and Science Fiction. Pan Stanford. ISBN 978-9814463584.

==== Non-academic works ====
- Berne, Rosalyn W. (2012). Waiting in the Silence. Spore Press LLC. ISBN 9780988192355.
- Berne, Rosalyn W. (2013). When the Horses Whisper: The Wisdom of Wise and Sentient Beings. Rainbow Ridge. ISBN 9781937907167.
- Berne, Rosalyn W. (2016). Waking to Beauty: Encounters with Remarkable Beings. Rainbow Ridge. ISBN 9781937907402.

=== Peer reviewed articles ===
- Berne, R.W. (2003, Spring). Human-Machine co-evolution: Recognizing mythology in visions of new technology. Technology and Society Magazine, Vol. 22, No. 1, pp. 34–39.
- Berne, R.W. (2003, April). Ethics, technology, and the future: An intergenerational experience in engineering education. Bulletin of Science, Technology, and Society. Vol. 23, pp. 88 – 94.
- Berne, R.W. (2004). Tiny ethics for big challenges - Calling for an ethics of nanoscale science and technology. IEEE Circuits and Devices Magazine. 20(3): 10–17, May–June, pp. 10–17
- Berne, R.W. (2004, October). Toward the conscientious development of ethical nanotechnology. Journal of Science and Engineering Ethics. Vol. 10, No. 4, pp 627–638.
- Berne, R.W. and Raviv, D. (2004, April). The Eight-Dimensional Methodology for innovative thinking about the case and ethics of the Mount Graham Large Binocular Telescope Project. Journal of Science and Engineering Ethics. (Special Issue: Proceedings of the Conference, Ethics and Social Responsibility in Engineering and Technology.) Vol. 10, No. 2. pp. 235–242.
