= Karen Berger =

American comic book editor (born 1958)

- Born: February 26, 1958 (age 68)
- Awards: "Best Editor" Eisner Award (1992, 1994 and 1995)

Karen Berger (/ˈbɜːrɡər/; born February 26, 1958) is an American comic book editor. She is best known for her role in helping create DC Comics' Vertigo imprint in 1993 and serving as the line's Executive Editor until 2013. She currently oversees Berger Books, an imprint of creator-owned comics being published by Dark Horse Comics.

== Biography ==
Berger majored in English literature and art history at Brooklyn College, and upon her graduation in 1979, she entered the comics profession as an assistant to editor Paul Levitz at DC. She later became Levitz's editor when he was writing Legion of Super-Heroes. More interested in horror comics, she soon became editor of House of Mystery, and was instrumental in nurturing Alan Moore's Swamp Thing book, taking over the editing from co-creator Len Wein. She also edited Amethyst, Princess of Gemworld. She later helped bring Neil Gaiman's work to a mass audience by having him write The Sandman.

The success of these titles, and her willingness to help the writers who worked with her push the envelope of what could be done in mass-circulation comic books, led to the creation of the mature-reader Vertigo line in 1993. Her critically and popularly successful titles under that imprint include Fables, Hellblazer, The Invisibles, 100 Bullets, Preacher, V for Vendetta, and Y: The Last Man.

Berger is married to Richard Bruning, who also formerly worked at DC.

In 2007, Berger was named supervising editor (along with Senior Editor Shelly Bond) of Minx, a new comic book imprint published by DC. Minx published comics and graphic novels aimed at teenage girls until they were cancelled in 2008.

On December 3, 2012, she announced that she would be stepping down from her post as Executive Editor & Senior Vice President of DC Entertainment's Vertigo imprint and that she would remain on through March 2013 to assist in the transition to a new editorial team.

The New York Times profiled Berger and her departure from Vertigo in an article entitled "Comics' Mother of 'The Weird Stuff' is Moving On".

In February 2017, Dark Horse Comics announced that Berger would be overseeing a new line of creator-owned comics published by Dark Horse under the imprint: Berger Books.

Berger Books' first print publication was Berger Books Free 2018 Preview, dated November 2017. Berger Books first full comic was Hungry Ghosts #1 (written by Anthony Bourdain and Joel Rose), on sale in comic book shops on January 31, 2018.

As of February 2019, Berger Books published several titles, including:

- Incognegro (10th anniversary edition) and a prequel Incognegro: Renaissance (February 2018) both written by Mat Johnson
- Mata Hari written by Emma Beeby (Feb–Sept 2018)
- She Could Fly written by Christopher Cantwell (July 2018) (with a sequel starting in April 2019)
- The Seeds written by Ann Nocenti (August 2018)
- Olivia Twist written by Darin Strauss (award-winning writer) and Adam Dalva (Sept 2018)
- LaGuardia written by Hugo Award winner Nnedi Okorafor (December 2018)

== Awards ==
- Inkpot Award in 1990
- Eisner Award for Best Editor (1992, 1994, 1995)
- Comics Buyer's Guide Fan Award for Favorite Editor (1997–2005)

== See also ==
- List of women in comics
- List of American comics creators
