= Greene Street Friends School =

Location
- 5511 Greene Street; Germantown, Philadelphia, Pennsylvania
- 40.03313°N 75.17469°W

Information
- Type: Private
- Established: 1855
- Head of school: Michelle Holland
- Grades: PreK–8
- Enrollment: 420
- Affiliation: Religious Society of Friends (Quaker)
- Website: greenestreetfriends.org

Greene Street Friends School is a coeducational school under the care of Green Street Monthly Meeting of the Religious Society of Friends. Located in Germantown, Philadelphia, Greene Street serves 320 students in grades Pre-K to 8.

== History ==
In December 2012, Greene Street purchased the property known as "the doctor's house" on the corner of Greene Street and West School House Lane. The building was demolished and the school hopes to add more green space to its campus. After demolition, Greene Street Friends built a porous, landscaped parking lot. They recently constructed a new building over their previously existing, non-porous parking lot. The new building includes a gym and music room and some new classrooms.

== Notable alumni ==
- Saul Perlmutter, Nobel Prize–winning astrophysicist./
- Holly Robinson Peete, actress
- Chris Dudley, basketball player and politician
- Mat Johnson, author
- Dylan Tichenor, film editor
- Lydia Artymiw, concert pianist
- Eugene Byrd, actor
- Rob Hardy, director
- Jaleel Shaw, jazz saxophonist
- Risë Wilson, activist
- Rosalyn W. Berne, author and scholar
