= Jonathan Vankin =

American author

- Areas: Writer, editor
- Notable works: The 80 Greatest Conspiracies of All Time

Jonathan Vankin is an American author, journalist and comic book writer/editor.

== Biography ==
Vankin is best known for his books Conspiracies, Cover-Ups and Crimes and, with co-writer John Whalen, the Greatest Conspiracies series, beginning in 1995 with The 50 Greatest Conspiracies of All Time. The latter has now been through four updated editions in addition to the original, the latest being The World's Greatest Conspiracies in 2010. In 2005 Vankin and Whalen co-authored a second book, Based on a True Story (But With More Car Crashes), a comparison of 100 films that purported to be "based on a true story," with the actual events that inspired the fictionalized screenplays.

Most recently, Vankin wrote the book Close To Zero: How Donald Trump fulfilled his apocalyptic vision and paid his debt to Putin with a devastating biological warfare attack on America, an account of Donald Trump's response to the COVID-19 pandemic. The Daily Kos said of the book "If that makes it seem as if this book is going to pull no punches, that's right. And it shouldn't. Because, as the contents make clear, Trump didn't just fail to provide for the nation in the face of a deadly pandemic, he deliberately failed. Making this the greatest crime in modern American history."

Vankin co-wrote the book for the Off Broadway musical Forever Dusty, based on the life of British pop star Dusty Springfield. His co-writer in this case was Kirsten Holly Smith who also performed the lead role of Dusty Springfield in the Off Broadway production.

Vankin has also written comic books. His graphic novel, Tokyo Days, Bangkok Nights was published in January, 2009. Also in 2009, he collaborated with co-writer and illustrator Arnold Pander on the graphic novel Tasty Bullet, published by Image Comics.

He wrote the Vertigo Comics series The Witching in 2004-2005 and the DC Comics series Brightest Day Aftermath: The Search For Swamp Thing in 2011. The latter series is notable for featuring the first appearance by Vertigo Comics character John Constantine outside of a Vertigo-branded comic since the early 1990s.

Again collaborating with Whalen, Vankin has written for the 1999 TV series The Crow: Stairway to Heaven.

Vankin was senior editor at Vertigo Comics, concentrating on original graphic novels from 2004 - 2011. He was responsible for the graphic novel The Quitter which brought Harvey Pekar to Vertigo Comics. He later edited two new volumes of Pekar's American Splendor series. He also acquired and shepherded the critically acclaimed graphic novel Incognegro written by Mat Johnson as well as The Green Woman written by renowned horror author Peter Straub and actor/writer Michael Easton.

Vankin, formerly a news editor of San Jose, California's Metro newspaper, is a graduate of Brandeis University.

== Bibliography ==
- Close To Zero: How Donald Trump fulfilled his apocalyptic vision and paid his debt to Putin with a devastating biological warfare attack on America Twilight of the Idols Inc., 2021, ISBN 9781-7369621-2-1)
- The Fifty Greatest Conspiracies of All Time: History's Biggest Mysteries, Coverups, and Cabals (with John Whalen, Citadel Press, 1994, ISBN 0-8065-1576-7)
- Conspiracies, Cover-Ups and Crimes (Illuminet, 1996, ISBN 1-881532-09-7)
- The Big Book of (with various artists, Paradox Press):
  - The Big Book of Scandal: Trashy but True Tales from the Tawdry Worlds of Celebrity, High Society, Politics, and Big Business! (1998, ISBN 1-56389-358-4)
  - The Big Book of Grimm (1999, ISBN 1-56389-501-3)
  - The Big Book of the 70's (2000, ISBN 1-56389-671-0)
- Tokyo Days, Bangkok Nights trade paperback (with artists Seth Fisher, Giuseppe Camuncoli & Shawn Martinbrough, Vertigo/DC Comics, January 2009, ISBN 978-1-4012-2189-8)
- The 80 Greatest Conspiracies of All Time (with John Whalen, Citadel Press, 2004, ISBN 0-8065-2531-2)
- The Witching #1-10 (with Leigh Gallagher, Vertigo, 2004–2005)
- Based on a True Story: Fact and Fantasy in 100 Favorite Movies (with John Whalen, Chicago Review Press, 2005, ISBN 1-55652-559-1)
