= Melvyn Morrow =

Australian playwright (born 1942)

- Born: 1942 (age 83–84); Melbourne, Victoria, Australia
- Occupations: Playwright; dramatist; screenwriter; theatre lyricist; English and drama teacher
- Family: Julian Morrow (son)

Melvyn Morrow (born 1942, in Melbourne, Australia) is an Australian playwright.

He co-wrote the jukebox musicals Shout! The Legend of the Wild One and Dusty - The Original Pop Diva with John-Michael Howson and David Mitchell. Earlier in his life he wrote material for The Mavis Bramston Show.

== Biography ==
He is a graduate of St Aloysius' College. He taught English and Drama at Stonyhurst College where he directed and wrote the libretto for the musical Frank Ass, based on the life of Francis of Assisi. The musical was also taken to the Edinburgh festival in 1974. He also taught at St Ignatius' College, Riverview, where he taught author Gerard Windsor, playwright Nick Enright, and entertainer Andrew O'Keefe. He is the father of comic Julian Morrow.

== Musicals ==
- When It Happens (With James Long)
- Vroom, Vroom (With Paul Coombes and Jim McCallum)
- Shout! The Legend of the Wild One State Theatre, Melbourne, (With John Michael-Howson and David Mitchell).
- Postcards from Provence Zenith Theatre, Sydney, 1993 (With John Mallord)
- Morality!
- Jack O'Hagan's Humdingers (With David Mitchell and Jack O'Hagan)
- I'm Not Henry Lawson's Mother (With James Long)
- Dusty - The Original Pop Diva Arts Centre, State Theatre, Melbourne (With John Michael-Howson and David Mitchell).
- Dare! The Musical - A musical celebrating 125 years of St Ignatius' College
- Dicken's Down Under
- The BIG MAKado or Three Little Maids From Schoolies - At St Aloysius College
