= Loving Day (novel) =

2015 novel by Mat Johnson

- Author: Mat Johnson
- Audio read by: J.D. Jackson
- Language: English
- Genre: Fiction
- Set in: Philadelphia, Pennsylvania
- Publisher: Spiegel & Grau
- Publication date: May 26, 2015
- Publication place: United States
- Media type: Print (hardback and paperback, e-book, and audiobook
- ISBN: 978-0812993455

Loving Day is a 2015 novel by Mat Johnson, published by Spiegel & Grau on May 26, 2015. It was named a best book of the year by numerous publications and won the American Book Award.

The novel's title refers to Loving Day, the anniversary of the U.S. Supreme Court decision in Loving v. Virginia, which nullified bans on interracial marriage.

== Plot ==
The novel, set in the Germantown section of Philadelphia, is about Warren Duffy, a comic book artist who inherits a dilapidated mansion from his recently deceased father. Warren's father was Irish-American and his mother was Black and had died long ago. Warren was married to a Welsh woman and managing a comic book shop in Cardiff, Wales; the marriage ended in divorce and the shop closed, so Warren returns to Philadelphia.

At a comic book convention, Warren meets his daughter, Tal, who was conceived after a romance he had in his teenage years. Tal, raised as a White girl, had been in the care of her Jewish grandfather, Irv. Warren is unaware of Tal's existence until he meets her.

Tal, who has been arguing with her grandfather, asks to finish high school while living with Warren. After first trying to enroll Tal in an all Black high school, Warren enrolls Tal in the Mélange Center, a school and social organization for mixed-race people. In order to pay Tal's tuition, Warren teaches drawing classes. He befriends Spider, a fellow teacher and a tattoo artist, and dates Sunita "Sun" Habersham, a comic book aficionado who is a member of the center.

As the novel progresses, Warren finds his views on race challenged and questioned. He argues with Sun, Tal, and Roslyn, the director at the Mélange Center, about whether embracing his mixed-race identity means rejecting his blackness. His old friend Tosha, who he reunites with after moving back to Germantown, believes he is rejecting his black roots.

After the police kick the Mélange Center off the land they were staying on because it was a public park, the center relocates to Warren's property. Tal is delighted with this, but Warren is not. He decides he cannot fix the house he inherited well enough to sell it, and begins to fantasize about burning it down and using the insurance money to send Tal to college and start a new life for himself. Meanwhile, the Mélange Center and other multi-racial organizations are planning for the annual celebration of Loving Day, the anniversary of the day interracial marriage was legalized in the U.S.

Warren, Tal, and Sun all see mysterious figures of a White woman and a Black man on the property. Warren thinks they are drug addicts, but Tal believes they are the ghosts of the first interracial couple. She records a video and the story of the ghost, the Mélange Center, and the upcoming Loving Day celebration is shown on local news.

Tosha and other members of the neighborhood are angry with Warren for letting the Mélange Center move in and accuse Warren of rejecting his Black community. Roslyn welcomes the attention. On Loving Day, Tosha and others protest outside the property, while the celebration itself is well attended. Warren, sick of everything, decides to burn the house down while everyone is distracted by the celebration. He accidentally sets his car on fire first, which causes an explosion and draws a crowd. He tries to run and is arrested by Tosha's husband George. The house then burns down.

Warren spends several days in jail. At first no one visits or calls him, but Sun eventually visits and tells him she forgives him. With help from George, all charges are dropped. Warren returns to his mostly empty property and reunites with Sun and Tal.

== Characters ==
- Warren Duffy, a biracial man who moves back to his hometown of Philadelphia following his divorce and his father's death
- Tal, Warren's daughter who he didn't know about until meeting her when she is 17
- Irv Karp, Tal's grandfather on her deceased mother's side
- Tosha, Warren's old friend who he reconnects with in Philadelphia
- George, Tosha's husband and a police detective
- Sunita "Sun" Habersham, a teacher at the Mélange Center who intrigues Warren
- Roslyn Kornbluth, the director at the Mélange Center
- Spider, a history teacher and tattoo artist at the Mélange Center

== Development ==
Like the main character of Loving Day, Johnson has an African-American mother and Irish-American father who divorced when he was young. Johnson described the book as "my coming out as a mulatto" and Baz Dreisinger of The New York Times described Loving Day as "a semi-autobiographical...extended literary metaphor about race and mixed-race in America".

In an op-ed for The New York Times Magazine, Johnson wrote about growing up struggling with his racial identity as "a black boy who looked like a white one" and wrote,

"My battle to prove my blackness ended in a truce in adulthood; I became “mixed.” Or rather, like many with my background, I embraced a multiracial approach to identity. I even celebrate Loving Day, the day that commemorates the 1967 Loving v. Virginia Supreme Court ruling legalizing interracial marriage nationwide. My mixed identity isn’t a rejection of my mother or of blackness — it’s an integration of blackness with the rest of who I am. But still, mixed with what?".

The novel is set in the Germantown neighborhood of Philadelphia, where Johnson grew up. In an interview with Fresh Air, Johnson said that he set the novel there because "Germantown was a physical representation of my ethnic identity and this contrast between European culture and African culture and this contrast between wealth and poverty and this overwhelming weight of history".

Johnson told Fresh Air that while he has thought about issues of race and identity his whole life, he saw Loving Day as "the funeral for having to talk about these issues. Like, I needed to say them. I needed to get them all out on paper. But I don't need to keep them with me forever."

== Reception ==
Reviews for Loving Day were generally positive. For The New York Times, Baz Dreisinger wrote, "the novel ultimately triumphs because it is razor-sharp, sci-fi-flavored satire in the vein of George Schuyler, playfully evocative of black folklore à la Joel Chandler Harris — yet it never feels like a cold theoretical exercise. Loving Day is that rare mélange: cerebral comedy with pathos". Jim Ruland in the Los Angeles Times wrote that Johnson's "unrelenting examination of blackness, whiteness and everything in between is handled with ruthless candor and riotous humor". In The Austin Chronicle, Wayne Alan Brenner said "Johnson delivers in the manner to which we've become accustomed: thoroughly, thoughtfully, and with the seriousness of the situation generously leavened with humor." Discussing how the novel changes after Duffy meets the members of the Mélange Center, Michelle Dean in The Guardian wrote, "what has heretofore been a funny, intelligent and self-aware account of a man’s agonized inner life is going to take a turn into high absurdity" and called the novel "a high-energy romp".

Loving Day was chosen as a best book of 2015 by numerous publications, including The New York Times, San Francisco Chronicle, NPR, Men’s Journal, Miami Herald, The Denver Post, Slate, The Kansas City Star, San Antonio Express-News, and Time Out New York.

Bucknell University chose the novel for the first year common reading for the Class of 2020.

Johnson was awarded an American Book Award for Loving Day in 2016.
