= Polly (brig) =

19th-century American sailing ship

History

United States
- Name: Polly
- Builder: Alden Briggs, Calvin Turner and Ichabod Thomas, Jr.
- Completed: 1791
- Fate: Swamped in storm 15 December 1811.

General characteristics
- Tonnage: 131 tons burden
- Propulsion: Sails
- Sail plan: Brig
- Crew: 7

Polly was an American brig that was swamped during a gale in late 1811 and spent the following six months adrift in the Atlantic Ocean. Edgar Allan Poe mentioned the saga of Polly in his 1838 novel The Narrative of Arthur Gordon Pym of Nantucket.

== History ==
Polly was a 131-ton brig constructed at Pembroke, Massachusetts in 1791, probably by shipbuilders Alden Briggs, Calvin Turner, and Ichabod Thomas, Jr. During her service life, the ship was home ported in Boston, Massachusetts.

== Shipwreck ==
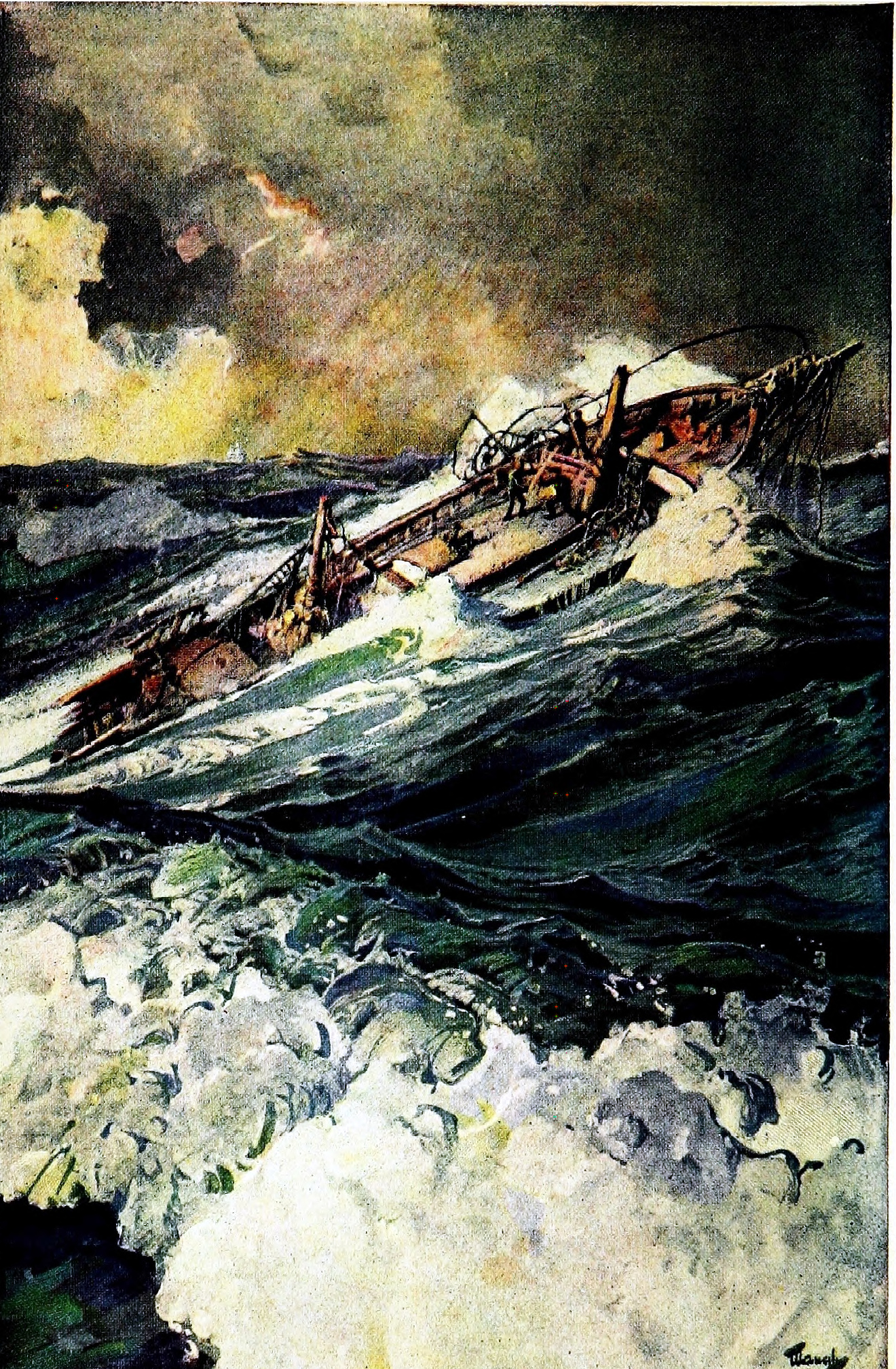
The wreck of Polly

On December 12, 1811, Polly departed Boston with a cargo of lumber and provisions (including salted meat) bound for the Virgin Islands. The ship was commanded by Captain Casneau, and carried eight others: the mate, four seamen, an Indian cook, a passenger named Mr. Hunt, and a 12-year-old African-American slave or servant girl belonging to Hunt.

Three days out, on December 15, Polly was caught in a severe gale. The storm capsized the ship and the masts were either carried away by the storm, or cut away by the crew. Relieved of the topweight, Polly rolled back onto an even keel. The ship was completely filled with water, but the cargo of lumber kept the ship afloat. However, two people, one of whom was Hunt, were lost during the storm, and the girl was badly injured.

The survivors began to salvage the wreck for usable items. Quantities of salted pork were recovered, and the survivors ate that raw until the cook managed to start a fire twelve days after the wreck, by using two sticks rubbed together. The supplies of salted pork ran out after forty days, and the survivors were forced to eat barnacles scraped off the hull, and the occasional shark and fish. The barnacles were exhausted by mid-April, but the survivors managed to catch additional fish. Stores of fresh water ran out after eighteen days, and water was subsequently obtained from a makeshift still made out of a tea kettle, a metal pot, and a pistol. Seawater was boiled in the pot, and condensation was captured in the tea kettle.

Over the next 191 days, Polly drifted across the Atlantic. The hulk was passed by over a dozen ships, but none offered assistance. Henry Howes, the first mate, was the first of the survivors to die, either 43 or 50 days after the wreck. Three other crewmen followed suit. By one report the remaining crew had begun to supplement their diet with cannibalism. Some references indicate the cook died at this time, while others indicate the cook survived the ordeal. By the 65th day, only two survivors remained.

On June 19, 1812, Captain Casneau and either the cook or a crewmember named Samuel Badger, were rescued by Captain Featherstone of the British ship Fame, en route to London from Rio de Janeiro. The crew were picked up 600 leagues (2,900 km) west of Marrakesh, having drifted over two thousand miles across the Atlantic. On July 9, the survivors were transferred to the brig Dromero and taken back to the United States.

The story of Polly is mentioned in an in-character footnote in Chapter 13 of Edgar Allan Poe's The Narrative of Arthur Gordon Pym of Nantucket. Poe's narrator, Arthur Pym, refers to the ordeal as similar to the one he experiences in the course of the narrative. Poe's source for the material may have been R. Thomas' Remarkable Events and Remarkable Shipwrecks, published in 1836.
