= Charles Romeyn Dake =

American writer and physician

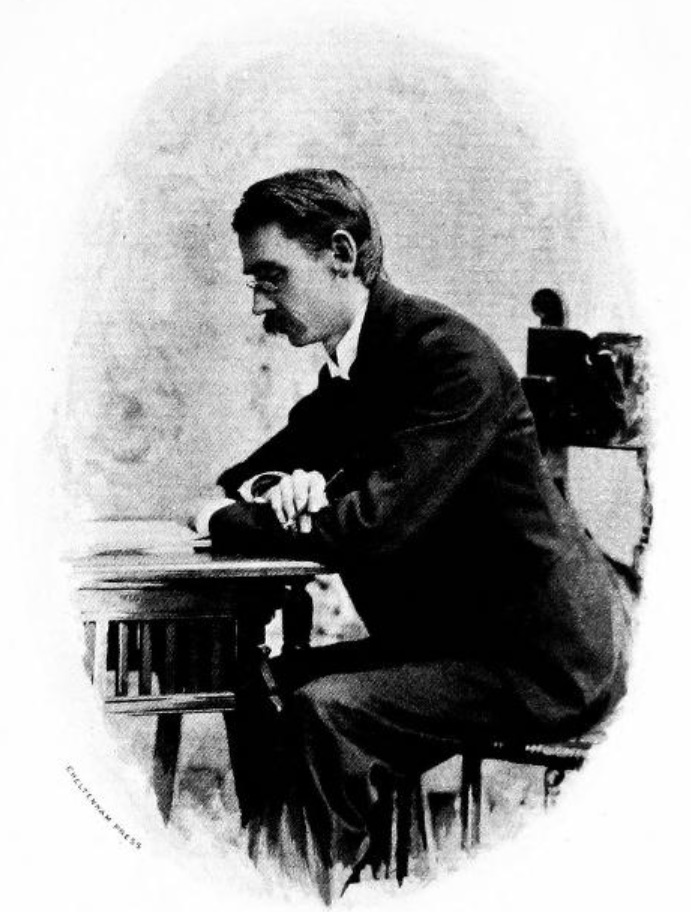
Dake in 1899

Charles Romeyn Dake (December 22, 1849 – April 23, 1899) was a 19th-century American homeopathic physician and writer. As an author, his name is sometimes spelled Charles Romyn Dake.

Dake's father and uncle were also homeopaths. He graduated from the Columbia University College of Physicians and Surgeons, and he practiced medicine in Belleville, Illinois. He served as the editor of a homeopathic journal. Dake published the novel, A Strange Discovery, a sequel to Edgar Allan Poe's The Narrative of Arthur Gordon Pym of Nantucket.

In 1899, Dake was diagnosed with lung cancer. In reaction, he committed suicide by shooting himself.

== Biography ==
Charles Dake was born in Pittsburgh, Pennsylvania to David Merit Dake and Mary Manule. His father and an uncle, J. P. Dake of Nashville, Tennessee, were also homeopaths. He had two daughters and at least one grandchild, Grace Bechtold.

He was an 1873 graduate of the Columbia University College of Physicians and Surgeons, and he practiced in Belleville, Illinois. In 1893 he became editor of the journal Homeopathic News.

Dake published two short stories and one novel, A Strange Discovery, which is a sequel to Edgar Allan Poe's The Narrative of Arthur Gordon Pym of Nantucket.

In early 1899 he discovered that he had lung cancer and committed suicide by shooting himself.

== Works ==
- Dake, Charles R. (December 1892). "The Limits of Imagination". Homoeopathic News. 21 (12). St. Louis, Missouri: F. A. Luyties. (translations also published in Germany and France)
- Dake, Charles R. (May 1893). "The Death and Resurrection of Gerald Deane". Homoeopathic News. 22 (5). St. Louis, Missouri: F. A. Luyties: 239–258.
- Dake, Charles Romyn (1899). A Strange Discovery. New York: H. Ingalls Kimball.
