= A Strange Discovery =

1899 novel by Charles Romeyn Dake

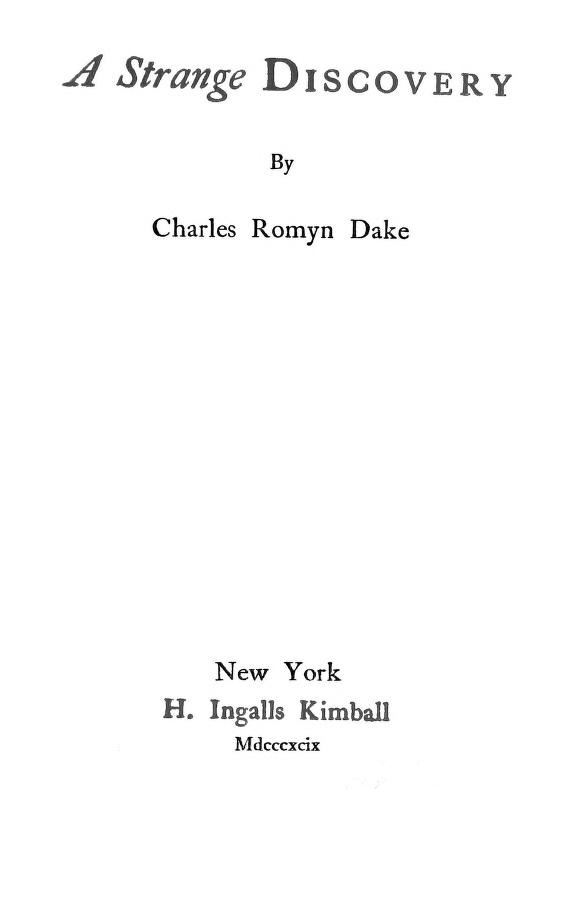
- Author: Charles Romyn Dake
- Language: English
- Genre: Adventure novel
- Publisher: H. Ingalls Kimball
- Publication date: 1899
- Publication place: United States
- Media type: Print (Hardback)
- Pages: 310
- Preceded by: The Narrative of Arthur Gordon Pym of Nantucket

A Strange Discovery is an 1899 novel by Charles Romeyn Dake and is a sequel to Edgar Allan Poe's The Narrative of Arthur Gordon Pym of Nantucket which was published in 1838. It follows the experiences of the narrator, an Englishman, during his stay in Bellevue, Illinois (see below), and his encounter with Dirk Peters, Pym's sailor companion in Poe's novel. On his deathbed, Peters relates the missing conclusion to Poe's tale.

== Plot ==
=== Part 1: How We Found Dirk Peters ===
The story is set in 1877, forty nine years after the events in Arthur Gordon Pym, and thirty-nine years after the publication of that book.

The narrator is an Englishman traveling in the United States to settle business interests in Southern Illinois. During his stay in Bellevue, Belleville, he makes acquaintance with two local doctors, an older man, Dr. George F. Castleton, and the younger Dr. Bainbridge. Dr. Castleton is an eccentric local character given to extravagant opinions, and the narrator mentions that he was later the Prohibition Party candidate for Governor of Illinois. During a discussion of Poe's works and Arthur Gordon Pym, Dr. Castleton reveals that Peters is a patient of his.

Much of the first section is given to the narrator's observations on American society and to discussions between him, Castleton, and Bainbridge on topics ranging from poetry and literature, to U.S. and European politics, to Christianity and agnosticism, to medical science.

Bainbridge describes his earlier discovery, at the Astor Library in New York, of a book written in 1594 and published in 1728, of a narrative purporting to tell the story of a sailor on Sir Francis Drake's voyage of circumnavigation. According to this book, Drake's ship was driven by a storm for two weeks, until, deep in the Antarctic, he arrived at a city which the author describes as comparable to Venice, but more beautiful than any European city of that time.

=== Part 2: The Story of Dirk Peters ===
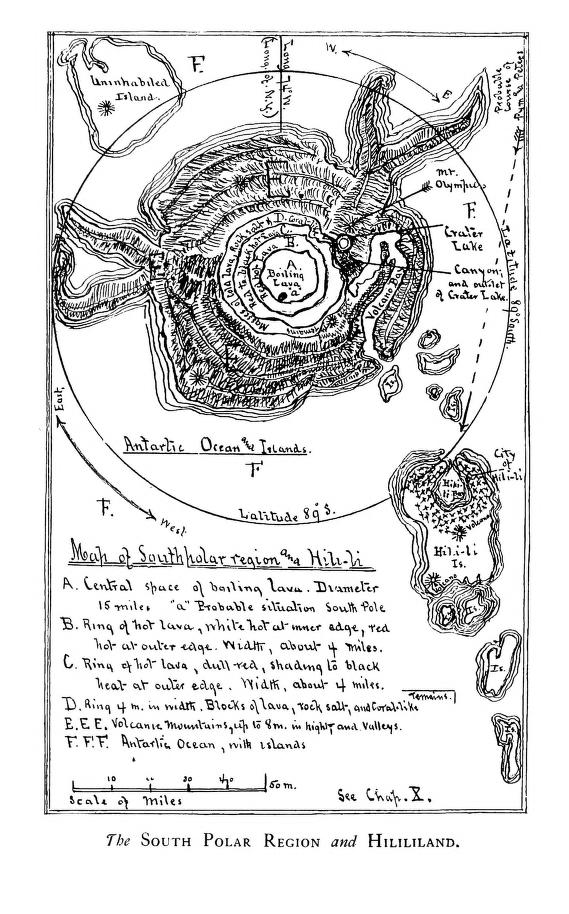
Map of South Polar region, according to Dake

Dr. Bainbridge visits Peters each day and elicits the story of his adventures with Pym a half-century earlier. Each night he visits the narrator in his hotel and relates, in episodic form, what he has learned from Peters. The narrator, in turn, passes on the essential points to Dr. Castleton as well as to Arthur, the hotel factotum.

After leaving the island of Tsalal, Peters and Pym voyage south through a curtain of fog into the area near the South Pole, which is warmed by volcanic activity. They come to the white figure mentioned by Poe at the end of his narrative. This turns out to be a great marble statue at the entrance to a harbor. Entering, they arrive in the city of Hili-li at 89°S latitude. Hili-li Island is one of over 200 islands in a great inland sea, surrounded by a ring-shaped continent. The continent consists of volcanic mountains and ice, making it impassable except for a 300-mile-wide gap, through which had come Francis Drake, Pym and his shipmates on the Jane Guy, and the occasional other castaway from the outside world.

The Hili-lites are a white race, descendants from a shipload of ancient Romans who left Rome and the Mediterranean fleeing from the barbarian invasions of the 4th century. Hili-li's 100,000 to 200,000 inhabitants are ruled by a Duke. There is also a reclusive, mystic old sage, Masusaelili, who claims to be a survivor of the original voyage from Rome.

Peters and Pym are treated hospitably, and Pym eventually falls in love with the Duke's niece, Lilima. The romantic interlude is interrupted when Lilima is abducted by her ex-lover Ahpilus. Ahpilus is one of a group of exiles who have been banished to the volcanic island at the pole for various offenses, mainly for engaging in forbidden sports or other physically dangerous activities. Ahpilus has gone mad as a result of his exile and unrequited love.

Peters, Pym, and the Duke's son Diregus lead a rescue expedition and catch up with Ahpilus on the slopes of the 8-mile-high "Mount Olympus", below the crater lake near its summit. Ahpilus threatens to throw himself and Lilima to their deaths in a gorge, but Peters, in a feat of astounding physical prowess, leaps across the gorge and incapacitates Ahpilus by breaking his back.

Returning to Hili-li, Pym and Lilima marry, but their happiness is short-lived. A rare meteorological event brings a period of intense cold and snow to Hili-li. Despite valiant efforts led by Pym, Peters, Diregus, and the returned Olympian exiles to fend off the cold, many of the Hili-lites succumb. Among these is Lilima.

The grief-stricken Pym is allowed to depart, along with Peters. They leave in December 1829, are picked up by a large schooner, and are deposited in Montevideo, Uruguay in February 1830. There Pym and Peters part company.

== Bellevue vs. Belleville ==
Although the setting of the story is identified as Bellevue, Illinois, details make it clear this is a reference to Belleville, Illinois, where the author worked as physician. The actual Bellevue is a small village, a suburb of Peoria, while the story explicitly takes place in a city in Southern Illinois, not far from St. Louis, Missouri. The book includes a photograph of the Loomis House hotel and a nearby hotel identified as one visited by Charles Dickens and described in his American Notes. Dickens indeed visited the Mansion House in Belleville during his 1842 trip and recounts his conversation with an eccentric physician he met there.

== Sir Francis Drake's lost log ==
Sir Francis Drake must have turned over the log of his 1577-1580 voyage to Queen Elizabeth, but because of the sensitive nature of his discoveries, it was probably kept secret, and no copy has ever surfaced. Nineteenth-century historians had to rely on the vague accounts supplied by his navigator, Nuna da Silva, to the Spanish Viceroy in 1579, and by John Wynter, commander of the ship Elizabeth, to the British navy. It was only in 1909 (ten years after the publication of A Strange Discovery) that Nuna da Silva's detailed log was discovered in the archives of Seville.

Based on the documents available to him at the time, Dake contends that "the story is that [Sir Francis Drake] once lost his 'bearings' for a month; in fact it is intimated that a hiatus of two months in his 'log' really did exist." During this hiatus, which occurred near Cape Horn, Drake's ship was supposedly driven all the way to Hili-liland.

== See also ==
- An Antarctic Mystery
