= Brookside Theatre =

Theatre in Romford, London Borough of Havering, England

Coordinates: 51.5761°N 0.1853°E

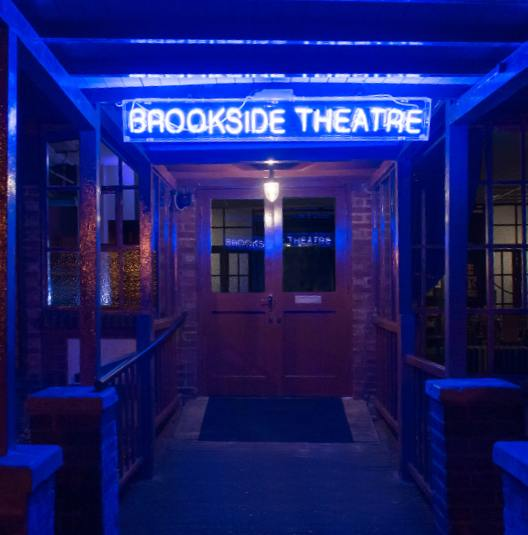
- The entrance to the Brookside Theatre
- Interactive map of Brookside Theatre
- Location: Romford, Greater London; United Kingdom
- Capacity: 194
- Public transit: Romford

Construction
- Opened: 2012; 14 years ago

Website
- brooksidetheatre.com

The Brookside Theatre is a 194-seat studio theatre situated in the centre of Romford in the London Borough of Havering, Greater London.

The theatre was established in 2012 and plays host to many full scale theatre productions; musicals and plays, tribute bands, live music, comedy and celebrity guests and has been heralded as "Romford's best kept secret".

== History ==
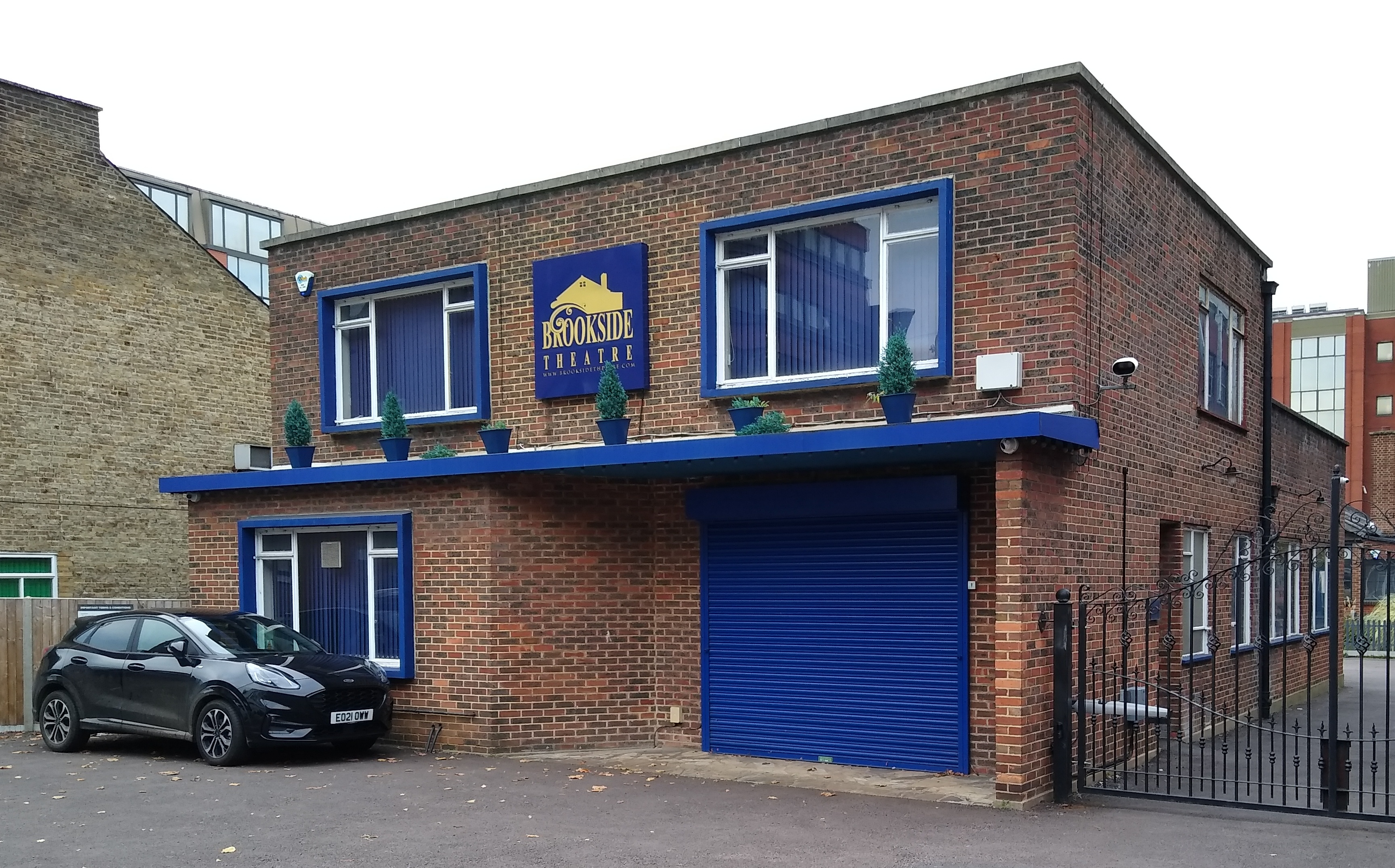
The outside of the Brookside Theatre

The Theatre staged its first production in 2012; Shout! The Mod Musical.

As well as producing in-house shows which have included Avenue Q, The Woman in Black, Sweeney Todd: The Demon Barber of Fleet Street, The Addams Family, Little Shop of Horrors, Peter Pan The Musical, and Hi-de-Hi!, the theatre now plays host to touring plays, top tribute acts, concerts, comedy evenings and celebrity guests appearances. The theatre has also produced a number of UK / world premieres including Forever Dusty, Life Could Be a Dream, When Rock n Roll Dreams Come True and Goodnight Sweetheart The Musical.

The theatre and the war memorial renovation is a completely self-funded project that relies on the generosity and kindness of local companies and organisations and the support of the local community as well as the dedication of its volunteers.

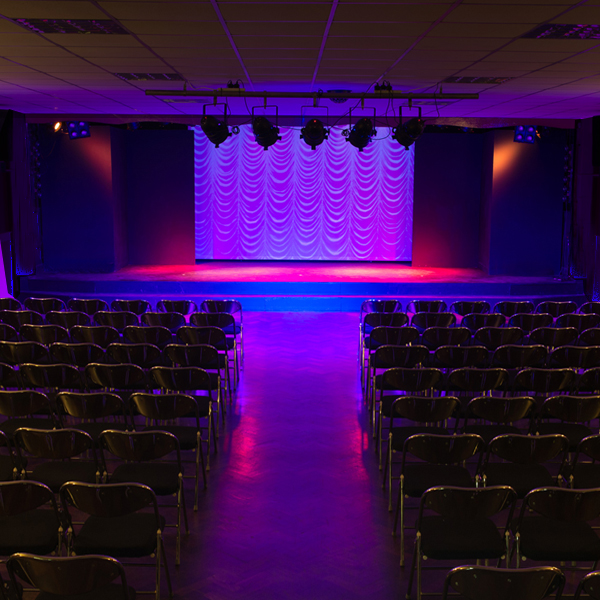
The Brookside Theatre Auditorium

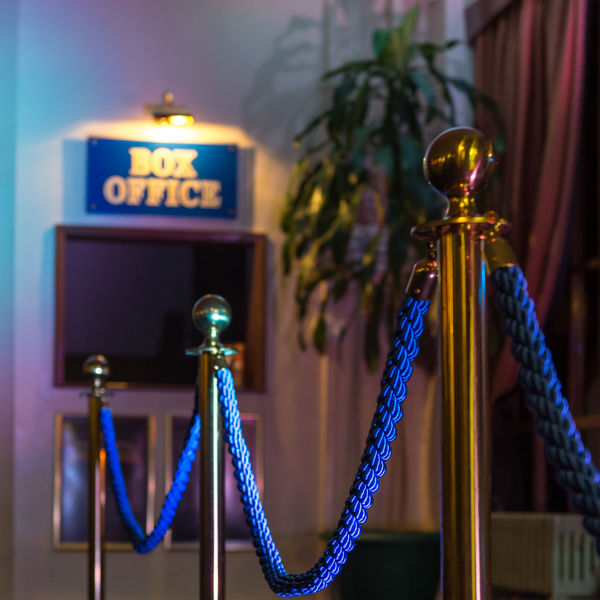
The Brookside Theatre Box Office

== Celebrity appearances ==
The following celebrities and bands have performed at the theatre:

- Derek Acorah
- Steve Brookstein
- Chesney Hawkes
- John Challis
- Beverley Craven
- Richard Digance
- Dominic Kirwan
- Anita Harris
- Chas Hodges
- Jeffrey Holland
- Jimmy Jones
- Joe Longthorne
- Hazel O'Connor
- Tony Stockwell
- T'Pau
- The Honeycombs
- Simon Day
- Bobby Davro
- Cheryl Baker
- Garth Marenghi aka Matthew Holness

== Alleged paranormal activity ==
The feature reached the international media's attention in 2014 following CCTV footage that allegedly showed possible paranormal activity.
