= The Witching =

Comic

Publication information
- Publisher: Vertigo
- Format: Ongoing series
- Publication date: August 2004 – May 2005
- No. of issues: 10

Creative team
- Written by: Jonathan Vankin
- Penciller(s): Leigh Gallagher
- Inker(s): Ron Randall
- Letterer(s): Phil Balsman
- Colorist(s): Brian Miller
- Editor(s): Shelly Bond; Mariah Huehner

The Witching is a comic book series written by Jonathan Vankin and Leigh Gallagher, with Tara McPherson creating the cover art. This comic was published in the United States by the DC Comics imprint Vertigo. A total of 10 monthly issues were released in 2004 and 2005. Issue #5 featured a guest artist, Mark Buckingham, best known as the regular artist on the Vertigo series, Fables.
