= An Antarctic Mystery =

1897 novel by Jules Verne

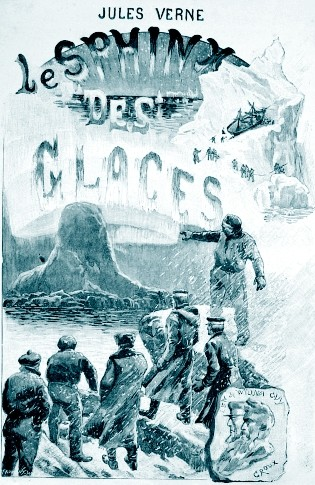
- Frontispiece of French edition
- Author: Jules Verne
- Original title: Le Sphinx des glaces
- Translator: Mrs. Cashel Hoey
- Illustrator: Georges Roux
- Language: French
- Series: The Extraordinary Voyages #44
- Genre: Adventure, Science fiction
- Publisher: Pierre-Jules Hetzel
- Publication date: 1897
- Publication place: France
- English publication date: 1898
- Media type: Print (Hardback)
- Preceded by: Clovis Dardentor
- Followed by: The Mighty Orinoco
- Original text: Le Sphinx des glaces at French Wikisource
- Translation: An Antarctic Mystery at Wikisource

An Antarctic Mystery (French: Le Sphinx des glaces, The Sphinx of the Ice Fields) is a two-volume novel by Jules Verne. Written and published in 1897, it is a continuation of Edgar Allan Poe's 1838 novel The Narrative of Arthur Gordon Pym of Nantucket. It follows the adventures of the narrator and his journey from the Kerguelen Islands aboard Halbrane.

Neither Poe nor Verne had actually visited the remote Kerguelen Islands, located in the south Indian Ocean, but their works are some of the few literary (as opposed to exploratory) references to the archipelago.

== Plot ==
=== Volume 1 ===
The story is set in 1839, approximately 11 or 12 years after the events in Arthur Gordon Pym, one year after the publication of that book.

The narrator is a wealthy American named Jeorling who, having entertained himself with private studies of the wildlife on the Kerguelen Islands, is now looking for a passage back to the United States. Halbrane is one of the first ships to arrive at Kerguelen, and its captain Len Guy somewhat reluctantly agrees to take Jeorling aboard as a passenger as far as Tristan da Cunha.

Underway, they find a stray iceberg with a dead sailor on it from the ship Jane. A note found with him indicates that he and several others including Jane's captain William Guy had survived an assassination attempt at Tsalal and the others are still alive.

Guy, who had talked to Jeorling earlier about the subject of Pym, reveals himself to be William Guy's brother. He decides to try to rescue Jane's crew. After taking on provisions on Tristan da Cunha and the Falklands, they head South with Jeorling still on board. They also take aboard a mysterious sailor named Hunt who is eager to join the search.

Extraordinarily mild early summer weather allows the Halbrane to make good progress and they break the pack ice barrier surrounding an ice-free Antarctic ocean. They first find Bennet's islet, where the Jane had made a stop, and finally Tsalal. But the island is completely devastated, apparently by a recent earthquake. All the inhabitants have died and evidence indicates they apparently died long before the earthquake. The crew finds the collar of Pym's dog, Tiger, but no trace of the Jane.

=== Volume 2 ===
At this point, Hunt is revealed to be Dirk Peters. He and Pym had become separated on their travel south of Tsalal and only Peters made it safely back to the States where he took on a new identity out of shame for having resorted to cannibalism on the wreck of Grampus. Pym's diary in his possession, he, not Pym, had instigated the publication of their voyage and the diary had apparently been significantly embellished by Poe.

Guy and Peters decide to push further south, much to the chagrin of a part of the crew led by one seaman Hearne, who feels they should abandon the rescue attempt and head home before the onset of winter.

Not much later, in a freak accident, Halbrane is thrown upon an iceberg and subsequently lost. The crew makes it safely onto the iceberg, but with only one small boat left, it is trapped. The iceberg drifts past the South Pole before the whole party is cast ashore on a hitherto unknown land mass still within the pack ice barrier. Hearne and his fellows steal the boat and try to make it to the open sea on their own, leaving the others to face the bleak prospect of wintering in the Antarctic.

However, shortly thereafter they see a small aboriginal boat drifting by. Peters swims out and secures it but finds within it Captain William Guy and the three surviving crewmen, semiconscious and nearly starved to death. Peters brings them ashore and the Halbrane crew nurse them back to life.

William Guy then recounts their story. Shortly after the explosion of the Jane (and presumably the departure of Pym's company), Tiger appeared again. Rabid, he bit and infected the natives who quickly fell victim to the new disease. Those who could, fled to the neighboring island where they died later in the earthquake.

Up to this point Guy and his men had lived fairly comfortably on Tsalal, which was now their own, but after the earthquake found their position untenable and made a desperate attempt to escape north by boat, where Peters found them.

The crews of the Halbrane and the Jane combine and decide to try to make it north in their newly acquired boat. They make good progress until they notice strong magnetic forces. They find the source of it is the Ice Sphinx, a huge mountain magnetically charged by the electromagnetic streams that converge on the Earth's poles.

Here, they find the remains of Hearne's team, which had come to grief when the Ice Sphinx's immense magnetic force attracted their boat's ferrous components and their iron tools and to it, smashing them on its rocks. The boat Joerling and the others were in escaped destruction because, being built by the natives, it contained no iron parts.

At the foot of the Sphinx, they also find Pym, who died the same way. Peters dies from grief on the same spot. The others embark again in their boat, finally reach the open ocean and are rescued.

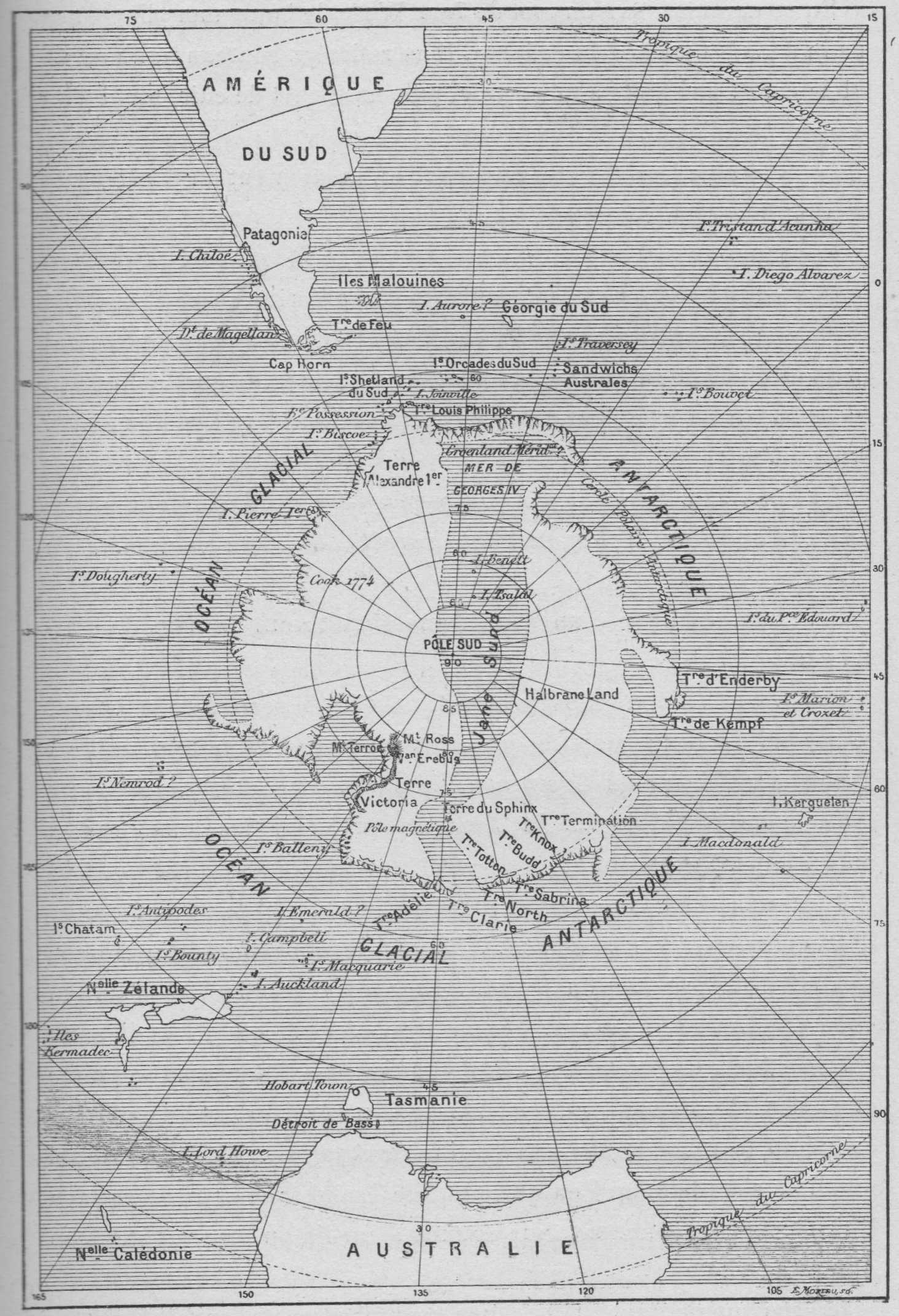
Verne's map of the Antarctic

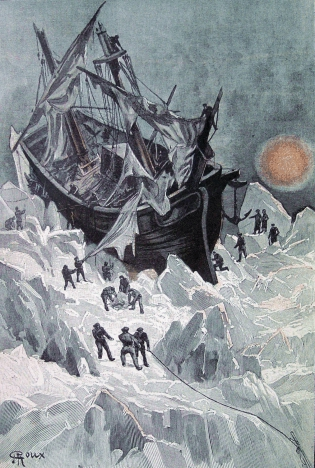
The wreck of the Halbrane

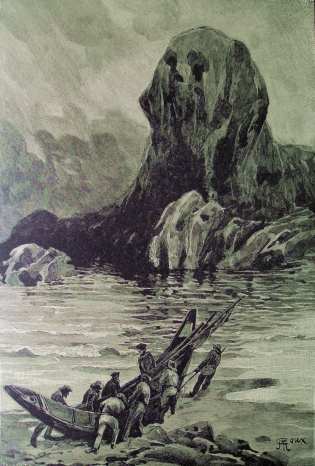
The Sphinx

== See also ==
- A Strange Discovery
- Port-Christmas
