= Risë Wilson =

Risë Wilson is a community organizer, activist, strategic planner, curriculum developer, non-profit consultant, and the current director of philanthropy at the Robert Rauschenberg Foundation, who lives and works in New York City. Founder of the Laundromat Project, she has been named one of the "worlds best emerging social entrepreneurs" in 2004. In 2015, she moderated the Creative Time Summit round table, entitled "My Brooklyn."

== Early life and education ==
Risë Wilson was born and raised in Germantown, Philadelphia in a mixed-income neighborhood in the northwest section of the city. She attended both Greene Street Friends School and Germantown Friends School before attending college. Also, before entering Greene Street Friends School she participated in Moore College of Art and Design's youth programs.

She attended Columbia University (1993–1997), where she earned a BA in African American Studies as a Kluge Scholar. She went on to earn an MA in Africana Studies from New York University (2004) as a MacCracken fellow.

== The Laundromat Project (LP) ==
Risë Wilson proposed The Laundromat Project in 1999 as a non-profit organization that combines art projects with community laundromats, and other public spaces like community gardens, within New York City. The origins of the project stemmed from Wilson's want for a studio to create her printmaking practice in, which is primarily linoleum and silkscreen. This inspired her to find spaces in her community for studio space. The organization itself was first funded in 2005 and aimed to build bridges between community members, amplify the sense of creativity in a community, and give ownership to communities. The LP creates partnerships with already existing laundromats to use their space for artwork and art making. The laundromats are located in places such as Bedford-Stuyvesant, Harlem, and Hunts Point and focus in low-income neighborhoods and in communities of color. The different spaces and locations offer workshops, potlucks, art shows, and dances for community members to attend and participate in. The LP started a "create change" initiative because of its belief that by using art to enact activism through community based programs. The values of the organization are to "creative catalysts, community centered, neighborly, people powered, active listeners and learners, collaboration and cross-pollination by design, and propelled by love." The audience members for this project range from artists, to children, parents, and general community members. Notable projects of this organization include field day, in which arts and culture come together in a block party celebration, which include open studio visits, free workshops, and creative walks. Workshops can range from card making, to collage making, to film making, and unlimited hands on activities. Other projects include an annual potluck in which food is provided and community members come up with workshop ideas for the upcoming months. The LP also holds an annual benefit titled "Soapbox" which includes a silent auction, live DJ, and fun art experiences that raise money for the organization.

In addition to community work, the LP also offers different types of artist development. This includes a fellowship program, which is for artists new to community work, a residence program, and a commission program, which allows for any alumni fellows to showcase work in the laundromat. The fellowship program was started in 2011, with a variety of artists from visual artists, to dancers, to comedians. These artist development programs give artists funds for creating, in addition to space for artworks. In addition, the project has an artist and community council which is made up of socially engaged arts professionals who work the communities that the laundromats are also located. These members serve as advisors to community events and represent the Laundromat Project.

== Leveraging Investments in Creativity (LINC) ==
In 2012-2013 Risë Wilson served as the program director for LINC. LINC was a ten-year initiative which aimed to effect change in support systems for artists in the United States. Wilson continued the work by creating cultural facilities that benefit artists and communities. Wilson was specifically hired to run their Space for Change Program which gave smaller community based arts organizations who were creating arts facilities support and monetary help. These facilities were used to help support both artists and communities.

== The Robert Rauschenberg Foundation ==
In 2013 Risë Wilson became the first director of philanthropy for the Robert Rauschenberg foundation. Her role is to support the philanthropy from the organization and redefine what it means to interact with social practice and the arts. One of her first projects included creating citywide discussions about climate change called the Marfa Dialogues/NY. Wilson partnered with Ballroom Marfa, a nonprofit center for contemporary art and culture, and the Public Concern Foundation which is a non profit foundation dedicated to creating dialogue and education around social issues, to create art events that brought about dialogue around climate change through artist and environmental activism and practice. The events that were planned ranged from panels, to an installation on the high line, to musical performances over two months in October/ November.

Wilson also heads the foundations SEED program which provides operating capital in the sum of $30,000 to start-up arts organizations in underrepresented areas of the United States. This program supports the organizations for three years towards their artistic goals. The organizations cannot apply for this grant, they must be nominated by a cultural leader from the community. In 2016 the organization donated $400,000 towards supporting artists and groups. Wilson also oversees the Artist as Activist initiative which started in 2013.

== Teaching and public events ==
Risë Wilson Wilson has also served as adjunct faculty for Parsons School of Design, teaching how to adapt product design classes to the public sphere.

Wilson was a moderator at the 2015 Creative Time summit round table entitled "My Brooklyn" where she introduced speakers who addressed a variety of issues that focused on the intersection of art and politics in the current United States school system.

She has also served as a consultant in the Media, Arts and Culture unit for the Ford Foundation in 2009.

== Selected awards ==
- Colombia Kluge Scholar (1993–1997)
- NYU McCracken Fellow (2004)
- The College Arts Association Professional Development Fellow (2002–2004)
- Echoing Green Fellow for Social Entrepreneurship (2004) for the Laundromat Project
- Ford Foundation Douglas Redd Fellow (2008)
