= Forever Dusty =

Forever Dusty The Dusty Springfield Musical
- Music: Various composers
- Book: Kirsten Holly Smith; Jonathan Vankin
- Productions: 2012, Off Broadway, 2017, London Fringe, UK Tour

Forever Dusty is a stage musical based on the life of British pop star Dusty Springfield. The musical numbers are all songs performed by Springfield during her career. The book of the musical was written by Kirsten Holly Smith, who also plays the lead role of Dusty Springfield in the originating production, and Jonathan Vankin. Forever Dusty opened on 18 November 2012 at New World Stages, an Off-Broadway venue in New York City. The UK Premiere opened on 3 May 2017 at Brookside Theatre, a London Fringe theatre as the start of a UK theatre tour.

== History ==
Smith originated the project at the University of Southern California in 2006, where she performed a workshop version of the piece as a one-woman show after receiving a Spectrum Arts Grant from USC.

Smith has said that her interest in Springfield's story was sparked by listening to the singer's Dusty in Memphis album. "That soulful, sultry, passionate yet vulnerable voice. I immediately identified with her and knew that I needed to explore the roots of Dusty’s voice. I felt like I knew exactly what she was feeling when she sang her songs, that maybe it was the same feeling I had when I sang," Smith said.

The one-woman musical moved in 2008 to the Renberg Theatre in West Hollywood, California. The theatre is part of the Lily Tomlin/Jane Wagner Cultural Arts Center at the Los Angeles Gay and Lesbian Center. The L.A. Gay and Lesbian Center co-produced the show, then entitled Stay Forever: The Life and Music of Dusty Springfield, with actress Jorja Fox (best known for her work on the TV series, CSI: Crime Scene Investigation ), Leslie Brockett and Jon Imparato as producers. Brockett was a producer of the USC workshop version as well.

The Off Broadway production of Forever Dusty is greatly expanded from the one-woman Stay Forever. The show became a full-scale book musical with the addition of co-writer Vankin. The cast now consists of five actors, each portraying multiple characters (with the exception of Smith, who plays Dusty Springfield only). The director of the production at New World Stages is Randal Myler, whose notable previous work includes the bio-musicals Love, Janis (about Janis Joplin) and Hank Williams: Lost Highway as well as the Tony and Drama Desk Award-nominated Broadway production It Ain’t Nothin' But The Blues.

Fox and Brockett stayed on as producers, joined by Jane Gullong and Sandalphon Productions. Helga Olafsson and Lawrence D. Poster came on as associate producers. Eva Price of Maximum Entertainment became the production's executive producer. Michael Thomas Murray served as musical director as well as associate producer.

On 13 February 2013, Forever Dusty played its 100th performance. The show marked the occasion with a "Sing Along Night," in which audience members were encouraged to sing along with the performers with lyrics being projected on the back wall of the set.

The United States west coast premiere of Forever Dusty was produced by Triangle Productions in Portland, Oregon, and ran from 2 February 2017, to 25 February 2017, at The Sanctuary at Sandy Plaza.

On 3 May 2017, Forever Dusty had its UK premiere at the Brookside Theatre, Romford, produced in conjunction with Strictly Theatre Entertainments Ltd. The run was the start of a UK theatre tour. The cast includes Katherine Ferguson in the role of Dusty Springfield.

== Show Description ==
Forever Dusty runs approximately 90 minutes without an intermission and contains 20 songs.

An "Author’s Note" included in the Playbill program of the New World Stages production states that the story of Springfield's life as told in Forever Dusty is true, but presented in "fictional form" for dramatic purposes, including composite characters and some alterations in "the time sequence of events."

The central plot line of the musical focuses on Dusty's relationship with "Claire," an African-American music journalist who becomes the singer's love interest. Events depicted in Forever Dusty include the origins of Springfield's career with her brother's group, The Springfields; her controversial arrest in and expulsion from apartheid South Africa for her refusal to perform to segregated audiences; her sponsorship of the first Motown revue in the United Kingdom; her troubled recording sessions for Dusty in Memphis; her public "coming out" as a lesbian; her comeback with The Pet Shop Boys; and her battle against breast cancer.

== List of musical numbers ==
- Wishin' and Hopin' (Burt Bacharach/Hal David)
- Seven Little Girls Sitting In the Back Seat (Bill Hilliard/Lee Pockriss)
- Island of Dreams (Tom Springfield)
- Tell Him (Bert Berns)
- I Only Want to Be With You (Michael Edwin Hawker/Ivor Raymonde)
- The Look of Love (Burt Bacharch/Hal David)
- Just a Little Lovin' (Barry Mann/Cynthia Weil)
- Love Power (Teddy Vann)
- People Get Ready (Curtis Mayfield)
- Willie and Laura Mae Jones (Tony Joe White)
- You Don't Have to Say You Love Me (Pino Donaggio/Vito Pallavicini /English lyrics by Vicki Wickham/Simon Napier-Bell)
- Son of a Preacher Man (John Hurley/Ronnie Wilkins)
- Little by Little (Buddy Kaye/Bea Verdi)
- Crumbs Off the Table (Ronald Dunbar/Edith Wayne/Sherrie Payne)
- I Just Don't Know What to Do With Myself (Burt Bacharach / Hal David)
- What Have I Done To Deserve This? (Allee Willis/Neil Tennant/Christopher Lowe)
- Brand New Me (Thom Bell/Jerry Butler/Kenny Gamble)
- Quiet Please There's a Lady On Stage (Peter Allen/Carole Bayer Sager)
- I Found My Way (Gil Slavin/Mike Soles)
- Don't Forget About Me (Gerry Goffin/Carole King)

== Cast ==
In order of appearance, for the Off Broadway production:

- Kirsten Holly Smith – Dusty Springfield
- Benim Foster – Jerry Wexler/Bob Thackeray/Assorted characters
- Christina Sajous – Claire/Assorted characters
- Coleen Sexton – Becky Brixton/Gini/Understudy for Dusty Springfield
- Sean Patrick Hopkins – Tom Springfield/Record Label Executive
- Ashley Betton – Understudy for Becky Brixton/Gini/Assorted characters
- Jonathan C. Kaplan – Understudy for Jerry Wexler/Bob Thackeray/Tom Springfield/Record Label Executive

Original UK Cast – London Fringe production:

- Katherine Ferguson – Dusty Springfield
- Jai Sepple – Jerry Wexler/Assorted characters
- Tash Thomas – Claire/Assorted characters
- Laura Hyde – Becky Brixton/Gini/Assorted characters
- Ben Ian Gordon – Tom Springfield/Record Label Executive/Bob Thackeray/Assorted Characters
- Isabel Gamble – Swing

== "Baby, It’s Cold Outside" ==
Though the song does not appear in the play itself, on 18 December 2012, Forever Dusty released a holiday video of Smith and Sajous performing the song "Baby, It's Cold Outside". The video was inspired by a 1978 television performance of the song by Springfield with Rod McKuen.
