= Kirsten Holly Smith =

American singer and actress

- Birth name: Kirsten Holly Smith
- Born: 21 September 1980 (age 44); Pittsburgh, Pennsylvania
- Genres: Alternative rock; indie rock; alt pop
- Occupations: Singer; musician; songwriter; writer; producer
- Instruments: Vocals; guitar
- Years active: 2021–present
- Labels: Wild Child Records

Kirsten Holly Smith is an American singer, actress, and writer. She is best known for her portrayal of Dusty Springfield in the musical Forever Dusty, which she co-wrote with Jonathan Vankin.

== Career ==
=== Dusty Springfield ===
She developed her characterization of Springfield beginning in 2006 with a workshop production of her one-woman biographical musical on Springfield, which she performed at the University of Southern California. She received a $6,700 grant from the university to stage the performance.

In 2008, Smith presented a revised version of her musical, then-entitled Stay Forever: The Life and Music of Dusty Springfield, at the Renberg Theatre in West Hollywood, California. The show received positive reviews from the Los Angeles Times, L.A. Weekly and other Los Angeles-area publications.

Smith continued to develop her Dusty Springfield piece over the next four years. During this time she revised her play into a full-scale, multi-character musical intended for the New York stage. In 2012, the new version of Smith's Dusty Springfield bio-musical, now entitled Forever Dusty, opened Off-Broadway at New World Stages in New York City. Smith again portrayed Springfield.

=== Other work ===
In addition to Forever Dusty, Smith has appeared on stage in plays including Of Mice and Men, Three Sisters and Twelfth Night as well as several films including the lead role in Isle of Lesbos.
