= Incognegro (comics) =

Book by Mat Johnson

- Cover to graphic novel
- Date: February 2008
- Publisher: Vertigo

Creative team
- Writers: Mat Johnson
- Artists: Warren Pleece
- Letterers: Clem Robins
- Editors: Mark Doyle; Jonathan Vankin
- ISBN: 1-4012-1097-X

Incognegro is a black-and-white graphic novel written by Mat Johnson with art by Warren Pleece. It was published by DC Comics imprint Vertigo.

== Publication history ==
The book was published by Vertigo in February 2008 as a hardcover (ISBN 1-4012-1097-X) and in June 2009 as a softcover volume (ISBN 1-4420-0200-X). Titan Books also released British versions, the softcover in June 2009 (ISBN 1848560974) and the hardcover in August of the same year (ISBN 1848560710).

The author, Mat Johnson, is an African-American who, due to his light skin, was able to be perceived as a white person. As a child he played games where he pretended to be an undercover black person investigating white hate crimes against blacks. He learned that Walter White, who served as the chief executive of the National Association for the Advancement of Colored People (NAACP), pretended to be a white person in order to investigate lynchings. In addition, he received inspiration from the birth of his twins in 2005, one of whom appears white and the other appears black.

== Plot synopsis ==
Zane Pinchback is a reporter for a black newspaper in the early 1930s New York City. He has built his career investigating lynchings while undercover as a white person, as he is light-skinned enough to pass for white. He is about to retire, but then fate intervenes as his brother is charged with the brutal murder of a white woman in Mississippi. Fearing that his brother will be lynched before given a chance to clear his name, Zane decides to go on one final investigation to free him, and brings along a friend who hopes to assume his job after he retires.

== Characters ==
- Zane Pinchback is an undercover reporter for the fictional black-owned newspaper The New Holland Herald newspaper based out of New York City. He takes undercover missions into the Southern United States to investigate lynchings which are ignored by newspapers owned by White Americans. Zane decides to quit these missions in favor of doing work based on the Harlem Renaissance but his editor asks him to take one more mission into Tupelo, Mississippi. George Gene Gustines of The New York Times described Zane as a "confident charmer".
- Carl is Zane's friend, who accompanies him in his mission to Mississippi. During his mission he pretends to be a baron from Europe. Gustines described Carl as "cocky and confrontational" and that "though his style ultimately lands him in dire trouble, Carl's method of jumping into the thick of things generates almost as much information as Zane’s restraint".
- Alonzo Pinchback is Zane's twin brother, who was accused of murdering Michaela Mathers, a local White woman. Alonzo, Michaela's boyfriend, had set up an illegal moonshine business with her. Gustines said that Alonzo "presumably has darker skin" than Zane. In the book, two characters see a resemblance between Alonzo and Zane only after being told that the two men are brothers.

== Reception ==
The book has received positive reviews in The New York Times, San Francisco Chronicle, and Seattle Times. George Gene Gustines of The New York Times wrote that Incognegro "proudly exemplifies the graphic novel". Nisi Shawl of the Seattle Times wrote that "with its savvy comments on racial politics and privilege, Incognegro is a valiant and successful effort to redeem the past without rewriting it". Charles Solomon of the San Francisco Chronicle wrote that Incognegro' "portrayal of a savage chapter in the history of race relations in the United States reflects the growing diversity and maturity of the graphic novel".

Tim Caron, author of "Representing Race in Incognegro: A Graphic Mystery", wrote that the book is perceived as discussing race with little public attention on its other themes and that the reviews discussed the racial "passing" but not the woman's "passing" as a man.

== Prequel ==
A prequel series Incognegro: Renaissance, also written by Mat Johnson, was published by Berger Books (imprint of Dark Horse Comics) from February to June 2018. A hardcover collection of the series was published in October of the same year.
