= Mat Johnson =

American fiction writer (born 1970)

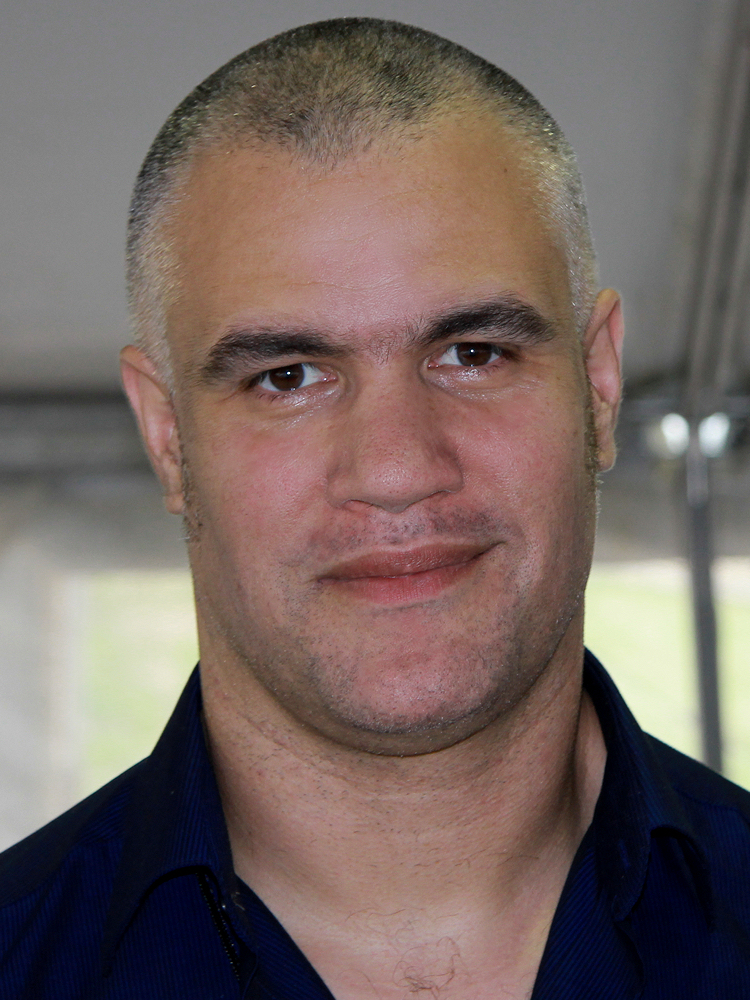
- Johnson at the 2011 Texas Book Festival
- Born: August 19, 1970 (age 56); Philadelphia, Pennsylvania, U.S.
- Education: Greene Street Friends School; West Chester University; University of Wales, Swansea
- Alma mater: Earlham College (BA); Columbia University School of the Arts (MFA)
- Writing career
- Notable works: Pym (2011); Incognegro (2008); Loving Day (2015)
- Website: matjohnson.info

Mat Johnson (born August 19, 1970, in Philadelphia, Pennsylvania) is an American fiction writer who works in both prose and the comics format. In 2007, he was named the first USA James Baldwin Fellow by United States Artists.

== Life and career ==
Johnson was born and raised in the Germantown and Mount Airy communities in Philadelphia.

His mother is African-American and his father is Irish Catholic. Johnson attended Abington Friends School, Greene Street Friends School, West Chester University, University of Wales, Swansea, and ultimately received his B.A. from Earlham College. In 1993 he was awarded a Thomas J. Watson Fellowship. Johnson received his M.F.A. from Columbia University School of the Arts in 1999.

Johnson has taught at Rutgers University, Columbia University, Bard College, and The Callaloo Journal Writers Retreat. He was a faculty member at the University of Houston Creative Writing Program. He is currently a professor at the University of Oregon's Creative Writing Program.

Johnson's first novel, Drop (2000), was a coming-of-age novel about a self-hating Philadelphian who thinks he has found his escape when he takes a job at a Brixton-based advertising agency in London, UK. The work was a Barnes & Noble Discover Great New Writers selection; Interview magazine named Johnson as a "Writer on the Verge"; and Drop was listed among "Best Novels of the Year" by Progressive Magazine.

In 2003, Johnson published Hunting in Harlem (2003), a satire about gentrification in Harlem and an exploration of belief versus fanaticism. Hunting in Harlem won the Zora Neale Hurston/Richard Wright Legacy Award for Novel of the Year in 2004.

Johnson made his first move into the comics form with the publication of the five-issue limited series Hellblazer Special: Papa Midnite (Vertigo 2005), where he took an existing character of the Hellblazer franchise and created an origin story that strove to offer depth and dignity to a character who was arguably a racial stereotype of the noble savage. The work was set in 18th-century Manhattan, and was based on the research that Johnson was conducting for his first historical work, The Great Negro Plot.

The Great Negro Plot is a creative nonfiction that recounts the New York Slave Insurrection of 1741 and the resultant trial and hysteria.

In February 2008, Vertigo Comics published Johnson's graphic novel Incognegro, a noir mystery that deals with the issue of passing and the lynching past of the American South. The work is illustrated by British artist Warren Pleece with cover artwork by Stephen John Phillips.

From 2006 to 2007, Johnson wrote the blog Niggerati Manor, which discussed African-American literature and culture.

== Awards ==
In 2004, Johnson's Hunting in Harlem won the Hurston/Wright Legacy Award.

Johnson was named a 2007 USA James Baldwin Fellow and awarded a $50,000 grant by United States Artists, a public charity that supports and promotes the work of American artists. On September 21, 2011, Johnson was awarded the Dos Passos Prize for Literature for his body of work focused on American themes and the human experience.

== Works ==
=== Comics ===
- Hellblazer Special: Papa Midnite (Vertigo, 5-issue limited series, 2005; tpb, 2006, ISBN 1-4012-1003-1)
- Incognegro (Vertigo, graphic novel, 2008, hardcover, ISBN 1-4012-1097-X)
- Dark Rain: A New Orleans Story (Vertigo, graphic novel, 2010, 160 pages, ISBN 978-1-4012-2160-7)
- Right State (Vertigo, graphic novel, 2012, 144 pages, ISBN 1-4012-2943-3)
- Incognegro: Renaissance (Vertigo, graphic novel, 2018, 128 pages, ISBN 978-1506705637)
- Backflash (Berger Books, graphic novel, 2024, 104 pages, ISBN 9781506745107)

=== Novels ===
- Drop (Bloomsbury USA, 2000)
- Hunting in Harlem (Bloomsbury USA, 2003)
- Pym (Random/Spiegel & Grau, 2011)
- Loving Day (Spiegel & Grau, 2015)
- Invisible Things (One World, 2022)

=== Nonfiction ===
- The Great Negro Plot (Bloomsbury USA, 2007)

=== Anthologies ===
- Gumbo: Anthology of African American Literature (Harlem Moon, 2002)
- Not Guilty: Twelve Black Men Speak Out on Law, Justice, and Life (Amistad Press, 2002)
- Mixed: An Anthology of Short Fiction on the Multiracial Experience (W. W. Norton, 2006)
- Black Cool: One Thousand Streams of Blackness (Soft Skull Press, February 2012)
