= Peter Milligan bibliography =

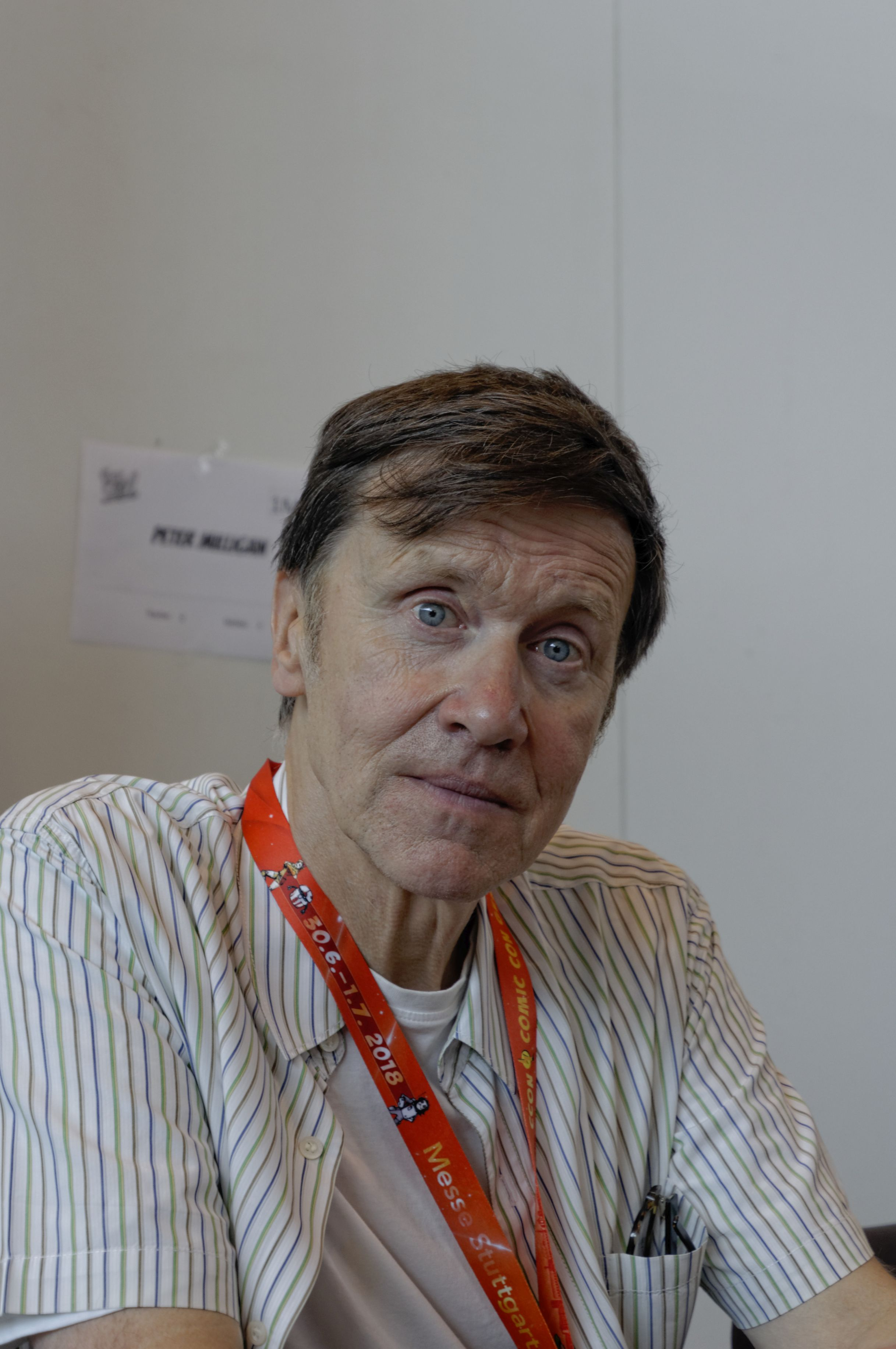
- Active period: 1978–present

Publishers
- 2000 AD: 1981–present
- DC Comics: 1989–present
- Vertigo: 1993–present
- Marvel Comics: 1996–present

This article is a bibliography of the British comic book writer Peter Milligan.

== UK publishers ==
Titles published by various British publishers include:

- Sounds: "The Electric Hoax" (with Brendan McCarthy, strip in the weekly music-themed newspaper, Spotlight Publications, 14 Oct 1978–24 Mar 1979)
  - Milligan joined McCarthy as the writer after the first few episodes; both creators were credited under various pseudonyms for most of the strip's run.
  - Six episodes were reprinted in The Best of Milligan and McCarthy (hc, 264 pages, Dark Horse, 2013, ISBN 1-61655-153-4)
- 2000 AD (anthology — published by IPC Media until 1986, Fleetway until 2000, and Rebellion since then):
  - Tharg's Future Shocks:
    - The Best of Tharg's Future Shocks (tpb, 160 pages, 2008, ISBN 1-905437-81-1) includes:
      - "The Man Who Was Too Clever" (with Brett Ewins, in #216, 1981)
      - "The Subterraneans!" (with Jose Casanovas, in #365, 1984)
      - "Bill Tompkins Meets... Bill Tompkins!" (with Jose Casanovas, in #371, 1984)
      - "Bad Timing" (with Massimo Belardinelli, in #375, 1984)
      - "The Castaway!" (with Geoff Senior, in #390, 1984)
      - "60 Hours that Shook the World!" (with Brendan McCarthy, in #391, 1984)
      - "Medusa!" (with Cliff Robinson, in #394, 1984)
      - "The Search for Spot" (with Jeff Anderson, in #398, 1984)
      - "Bad Maxwell!" (with Brendan McCarthy, in #402, 1985)
      - "Crazy War" (with Anthony Jozwiak, in #404, 1985)
      - "Extra! Extra!" (with Jose Casanovas, in #407, 1985)
      - "Nerves of Steel!" (with Will Simpson, in #408, 1985)
      - "But is It Art?" (with Eric Bradbury, in #409, 1985)
      - "Eggravation" (with Eric Bradbury, in #420, 1985)
      - "Grainger in Paradise!" (with Kev Hopgood, in #426, 1985)
      - "Car Wars" (with John Higgins) and "Speak No Evil" (with Eric Bradbury, in #434, 1985)
      - "The Long Sleep" (with Jeff Anderson, in #435, 1985)
      - "Project Salvation!" (with John Higgins, in #436, 1985)
      - "The War with the Slobb!" (with Barry Kitson, in #437, 1985)
      - "The Revenge of the Yallop Cringe!" (with Geoff Senior, in #438, 1985)
      - "Eric the Wild!" (with Anthony Jozwiak, in #439, 1985)
      - "Prisoner of Conscience!" (with Barry Kitson, in #440, 1985)
      - "Doing Time!" (with Robin Smith, in #441, 1985)
      - "It's the Thought That Counts!" (with Steve Dillon, in #442, 1985)
      - "The Armageddon Game" (with Anthony Jozwiak, in #462, 1986)
      - "The Possessed" (with Trevor Goring, in #375, 1984)
    - "The Ghost Outside the Machine!" (with Jose Casanovas, in #374, 1984)
    - "The Snikker Snack" (with Jeff Anderson, in #410, 1985)
    - Sooner or Later (tpb, 96 pages, 2016, ISBN 1-78108-428-9) includes:
      - "Breathless" (with Brendan McCarthy, in #420, 1985)
    - "Do You Copy?" (with Brendan McCarthy, in Sci-Fi Special '85, 1985)
  - Sooner or Later:
    - Sooner or Later (tpb, 96 pages, 2016, ISBN 1-78108-428-9) collects:
      - "Sooner or Later" (with Brendan McCarthy, in #468–496 and 498–499, 1986)
      - "Swifty's Return" (with Jamie Hewlett, in #614–617, 1989)
  - Rogue Trooper (with José Ortiz):
    - Rogue Trooper: Tales of Nu-Earth Volume 3 (tpb, 400 pages, 2012, ISBN 1-78108-068-2) includes:
      - "The Fanatics" (in Sci-Fi Special '86, 1986)
      - "Nort by Nortwest" (in Annual '87, 1986)
  - Bad Company:
    - The Complete Bad Company (tpb, 368 pages, 2011, ISBN 1-907519-46-7) collects:
      - "Bad Company" (with Brett Ewins, in #500–519, 1986–1987)
      - "Bad Company II: The Bewilderness" (with Brett Ewins, in #548–557, 1987–1988)
      - "Bad Company II: The Krool Heart" (with Brett Ewins, in #576–585, 1988)
      - "Young Men Marching" (with Brett Ewins, in Annual '89, 1988)
      - "Simply" (with Brett Ewins, in #601, 1988)
      - "Kano" (with Brett Ewins, in #828–837, 1993)
      - "Down Among the Dead Men" (with Brett Ewins, in Prog 2001, 2000)
      - "Bad Company 2002" (with Brett Ewins, in Prog 2002 and #1273–1277, 2001–2002)
    - "Ararat" (prose story with illustrations by Brett Ewins, in Annual '90, 1989)
    - "First Casualties" (with Rufus Dayglo, in #1950–1961, 2015) collected as Bad Company: First Casualties (tpb, 96 pages, 2016, ISBN 1-78108-442-4)
    - "Terrorists" (with Rufus Dayglo, in #2061–2072, 2017–2018)
    - "The Torture Farm" (with Cam Smith, in #2400, 2024) collected in Judge Dredd: Nordland Rising (tpb, 112 pages, 2026, ISBN 1-83786-852-2)
  - The Dead (with Massimo Belardinelli, in #510–519, 1987)
  - Freaks (with John Higgins, in #542–547, 1987)
  - Judge Anderson: "Dear Diary" (prose story with illustrations by Eddy Cant, in Annual '88, 1987) collected in Judge Anderson: The Psi Files Volume 3 (tpb, 304 pages, 2013, ISBN 1-78108-106-9)
  - Tribal Memories (with Tony Riot, in #585–588, 1988) collected in 2000 AD Presents: Sci-Fi Thrillers (tpb, 320 pages, 2013, ISBN 1-78108-177-8)
  - Bix Barton (with Jim McCarthy, in #663–668, Sci-Fi Special '90, Winter Special '90, 723–728, 737–741, 761–766, Yearbook '93, Sci-Fi Special '93, Winter Special '94 and 912–917, 1990–1994)
  - Shadows (with Richard Elson, in #672–681, 1990)
  - Hewligan's Haircut (with Jamie Hewlett, in #700–707, 1990) collected as Hewligan's Haircut (hc, 64 pages, 2003, ISBN 1-904265-06-5; tpb, 2011, ISBN 1-906735-98-0)
  - Judge Dredd: "Judge Planet" (with Shaky Kane, in Judge Dredd Mega-Special #4, 1991) collected in Judge Dredd: The Restricted Files Volume 3 (tpb, 288 pages, 2011, ISBN 1-907992-21-9)
  - Counterfeit Girl (with Rufus Dayglo, in #2000–2008 and 2010, 2016) collected as Counterfeit Girl (tpb, 64 pages, 2019, ISBN 1-78108-724-5)
  - The Devil's Railroad (with Rufus Dayglo, in #2352–2355 and 2357–2366, 2023–2024)
  - The Discarded (with Kieran McKeown, in #2463–2475, 2025–2026)
- Intergalactic Quest (series of gamebooks illustrated by an uncredited artist and published by Macdonald and Co.):
  - Cosmic Triangle (32 pages, 1986, ISBN 0-361-07241-4)
  - Doomed World (32 pages, 1986, ISBN 0-361-07242-2)
  - Kidnap in Space (32 pages, 1986, ISBN 0-361-07243-0)
  - Slavers of Devron (32 pages, 1986, ISBN 0-361-07244-9)
- IPC Media:
  - Battle Action Force #600: "The Fighting Magees" (with Francisco Solano López, anthology, 1986)
  - Eagle #242–258: "Clovis and Chowdhary: The Hard Men" (with Mike Western, anthology, 1986–1987)
- News on Sunday Extra: "Summer of Love" (with Brendan McCarthy, strip in the monthly newspaper supplement, 1987)
  - Seven episodes were published between April and November 1987; according to McCarthy, four more episodes were produced.
  - The seven published episodes were reprinted in The Best of Milligan and McCarthy (hc, 264 pages, Dark Horse, 2013, ISBN 1-61655-153-4)
- Deadline (anthology, Deadline Publications):
  - "Johnny Nemo" (with Brett Ewins and Steve Dillon (#6 and 12), in #1–12 and 50, 1988–1989 + 1993)
    - The Johnny Nemo feature in issue #5 is a four-page prose story with an illustration by Ewins.
    - The stories in issues #7–9 are reprints of the strips originally published in Strange Days #1–3 (Eclipse, 1984–1985)
    - The stories in issues #10–11 are reprints of the strip originally published in The Johnny Nemo Magazine #3 (Eclipse, 1986)
    - The reprint in issue #11 omits the last page of the original strip, and the story in issue #12 presents an all-new 8-page ending for it.
    - The stories from issues #1–4, 6–9 and 50 are collected in The Complete Johnny Nemo (hc, 160 pages, Titan, 2014, ISBN 1-78276-070-9)
  - "The Writer" (two-page prose story with an illustration by Shaky Kane, in #1, 1988)
  - "The Golem" (two-page prose story with an illustration by Brett Ewins, in #2, 1988)
  - "Nobody" (three-page prose story, in #3, 1988)
  - "The Christmas My Great Uncle Spent with Hemingway and the Joyces" (three-page prose story, in #14, 1989)
- A1 (anthology, Atomeka):
  - "The Hollow Circus" (with Brendan McCarthy, in #1, 1989) collected in The Best of Milligan and McCarthy (hc, 264 pages, Dark Horse, 2013, ISBN 1-61655-153-4)
  - "Big Death" (with David Lloyd, in #2, 1990)
  - "The Temple of Sweat" (prose story with illustrations by John Higgins, in the True Life Bikini Confidential one-shot, 1990)
  - "In the Penal Colony" (adaptation of the short story by Franz Kafka; script by Milligan, art by Brett Ewins, in #5, 1991)
- Fleetway:
  - Judge Dredd Annual '90: "Radical Cheek" (prose story with illustrations by Jamie Hewlett, co-feature, 1989)
  - Revolver #1–6: "Rogan Gosh: Star of the East" (with Brendan McCarthy, anthology, 1990)
    - Collected as Rogan Gosh: Star of the East (tpb, 80 pages, Vertigo, 1994, ISBN 1-56389-143-3)
    - The Vertigo collection was subsequently reprinted in The Best of Milligan and McCarthy (hc, 264 pages, Dark Horse, 2013, ISBN 1-61655-153-4)
  - The Comic Relief Comic (among other writers and artists, one-shot, 1991)
- Skin (with Brendan McCarthy, graphic novel, 48 pages, Tundra UK, 1992, ISBN 1-85809-000-8)
  - The story was initially slated to appear as a serial in Fleetway's Crisis anthology series, but ended up shelved due to its controversial subject matter.
  - The graphic novel was subsequently reprinted in The Best of Milligan and McCarthy (hc, 264 pages, Dark Horse, 2013, ISBN 1-61655-153-4)
- Titan:
  - The Complete Johnny Nemo: "The Make Over" (with Brett Ewins, Rufus Dayglo, Jock and Ashley Wood; story created for the collected edition, hc, 160 pages, 2014, ISBN 1-78276-070-9)
  - The Mummy: Palimpsest #1–5 (with Ronilson Freire, Hammer Comics, 2016–2017) collected as The Mummy: Palimpsest (tpb, 128 pages, 2017, ISBN 1-78585-978-1)
  - Dan Dare vol. 2 #1–4 (with Alberto Foche, 2017–2018) collected as Dan Dare: He Who Dares (tpb, 112 pages, 2018, ISBN 1-78586-147-6)
  - The Prisoner vol. 2 #1–4 (with Colin Lorimer, 2018) collected as The Prisoner: The Uncertainty Machine (tpb, 112 pages, 2018, ISBN 1-78585-915-3)
- Judge Dredd Megazine #378–379: "Judge Dredd: Psicho" (with Tiernen Trevallion, anthology, Rebellion, 2016–2017)
- The Spirit Centenary Newspaper (with Duncan Fegredo, untitled 1-page story in the tabloid-sized anthology, LICAF, 2017)

== US publishers ==
=== Early work ===
Titles published by various American publishers in the earlier part of Milligan's career include:

- Vanguard Illustrated (anthology, Pacific Comics):
  - "Freakwave!" (with Brendan McCarthy, in #1–3, 1983–1984)
    - The concept was initially developed by Milligan and McCarthy as a film pitch; further three episodes were published in Milligan/McCarthy/Brett Ewins' anthology series Strange Days.
    - First episode of the Vanguard Illustrated strip and the entire Strange Days serial are collected in The Best of Milligan and McCarthy (hc, 264 pages, Dark Horse, 2013, ISBN 1-61655-153-4)
  - "The God Run" (with George Freeman, in #6, 1984)
- Strange Days #1–3 (anthology, Eclipse, 1984–1985) featuring:
  - "Freakwave" (with Brendan McCarthy and Brett Ewins)
  - "Johnny Nemo: The Orb of Harmony" (with Brett Ewins)
    - A spin-off 3-issue limited series, written by Milligan and drawn by Ewins, was published as The Johnny Nemo Magazine (Eclipse, 1985–1986) featuring:
      - "Johnny Nemo: The Spice of Death" (in #1–2)
      - "Johnny Nemo: New London Pride" (in #3)
      - "Sindi Shade" (in #1–3)
    - In 1989, a reprint of "The Orb of Harmony" and an expanded version of "New London Pride" (with an additional 8-page chapter drawn by Steve Dillon) were published in black-and-white in the UK magazine Deadline.
    - The Johnny Nemo stories from The Johnny Nemo Magazine and the black-and-white version of "The Orb of Harmony" are collected in The Complete Johnny Nemo (hc, 160 pages, Titan, 2014, ISBN 1-78276-070-9)
  - "Paradax!" (with Brendan McCarthy)
    - An untitled 1-page Paradax strip, written by Milligan and drawn by McCarthy, was published in the UK anthology volume Strip AIDS (56 pages, Willyprods/Small Time Ink, 1987, ISBN 0-9512522-0-8)
    - A spin-off 2-issue limited series, consisting of an issue featuring three new short stories and an issue reprinting the Strange Days serial with new colouring by McCarthy, was published as Paradax! (Vortex, 1987)
    - The Strip AIDS strip, issue #1 of the Paradax! series and the Strange Days serial with the original colouring are collected in The Best of Milligan and McCarthy (hc, 264 pages, Dark Horse, 2013, ISBN 1-61655-153-4)
  - "Tales from the 4th Dimension" (with Brett Ewins, 1-page strip in #1)
  - "Krazy Foam" (with Brendan McCarthy, 1-page strip in #1)
  - "3 Wise Men" (with Brett Ewins and Brendan McCarthy, 1-page strip in #2)
  - "Tales from Eutopia" (with Tony Riot, 1-page strip in #3)
  - "Einstein's Blue Baby of the Month" (text for an illustration by Brett Ewins, in #3)
- Mister X Special: "Mister Insect X" (with Brett Ewins, one-shot, Vortex, 1990) collected in Mister X: The Brides of Mister X and Other Stories (hc, 320 pages, Dark Horse, 2011, ISBN 1-59582-645-9)

=== DC Comics ===
Titles published by DC Comics and its various imprints include:

- Skreemer #1–6 (with Brett Ewins, 1989) collected as Skreemer (tpb, 176 pages, Vertigo, 2002, ISBN 1-56389-925-6)
- Shade, the Changing Man vol. 2 #1–70 (with Chris Bachalo, Bill Jaaska (#10), Bryan Talbot (#14), Jan Duursema (#20), Brendan McCarthy (#22), Colleen Doran (#27–29, 31–32), Duncan Eagleson (#30), Glyn Dillon (#34, 38, 40–41, 45), Peter Gross (#36), Scot Eaton (#39), Philip Bond (#40, 43, 48), Steve Yeowell (#42), Mark Buckingham (#49–50, 54–57, 59–60), Sean Phillips (#51–53), Michael Lark (#56, 58–59), Richard Case (#61–63, 65–70), Andy Pritchett (#62) and Jamie Tolagson (#64 and 67); published under the Vertigo imprint starting with issue #33, 1990–1996) collected as:
  - The American Scream (collects #1–6, tpb, 168 pages, Vertigo, 2003, ISBN 1-84023-716-3)
  - The Edge of Vision (collects #7–13, tpb, 192 pages, Vertigo, 2009, ISBN 1-4012-2539-X)
  - Scream Time (collects #14–19, tpb, 176 pages, Vertigo, 2010, ISBN 1-4012-2768-6)
  - Shade, the Changing Man by Peter Milligan and Chris Bachalo Omnibus Volume 1 (collects #1–37, hc, 992 pages, DC Black Label, 2025, ISBN 1-7995-0030-6)
  - Shade, the Changing Man by Peter Milligan and Chris Bachalo Omnibus Volume 2 (collects #38–70, hc, 1,000 pages, DC Black Label, 2026, ISBN 1-7995-1052-2)
    - Includes "The Vision" short story (art by Mike Allred) from Vertigo Jam (anthology one-shot, 1993)
    - Includes the "One Girl's Crazy Story" short story (art by Mike Allred) from Vertigo X Anniversary Preview (promotional one-shot, 2003)
- Batman:
  - Batman #452–454: "Dark Knight, Dark City" (with Kieron Dwyer, 1990)
    - Collected in Batman: Dark Knight, Dark City (tpb, 192 pages, 2015, ISBN 1-4012-5127-7)
    - Collected in Batman: The Caped Crusader Volume 3 (tpb, 328 pages, 2019, ISBN 1-4012-9427-8)
  - Detective Comics (with Jim Aparo and Tom Mandrake (#633), 1991–1992) collected as:
    - Batman: Dark Knight, Dark City (includes #629–633, tpb, 192 pages, 2015, ISBN 1-4012-5127-7)
    - Batman: The Dark Knight Detective Volume 6 (includes #629–633, tpb, 320 pages, 2022, ISBN 1-77951-330-5)
    - Batman: The Dark Knight Detective Volume 7 (includes #638 and 643, tpb, 280 pages, 2023, ISBN 1-77951-330-5)
    - Batman: The Caped Crusader Volume 5 (includes #639–640, tpb, 248 pages, 2021, ISBN 1-77950-601-5)
      - Also collects Batman #472–473 (written by Milligan, art by Norm Breyfogle, 1991) as part of "The Idiot Root" inter-title crossover.
  - Catwoman Defiant (with Tom Grindberg, graphic novel, 48 pages, 1992, ISBN 1-56389-071-2) collected in Catwoman: Life Lines (tpb, 600 pages, 2024, ISBN 1-7795-2846-9)
  - New Year's Evil: Scarecrow (with Duncan Fegredo, one-shot, 1998) collected in Batman: Scarecrow Tales (tpb, 176 pages, 2005, ISBN 1-4012-0443-0)
  - Batman: The Resurrection of Ra's al Ghul (hc, 256 pages, 2008, ISBN 1-4012-1785-0; tpb, 2009, ISBN 1-4012-2032-0) includes:
    - Batman Annual #26: "Resurrection Shuffle" (with David López, 2007)
    - Robin vol. 2 #168–169: "The Resurrection of Ra's al Ghul, Parts 1 and 5" (with Freddie Williams II (#168) and David Baldeon (#169), 2008)
  - Detective Comics #842: "The Suit of Sorrows" (with Dustin Nguyen, 2008) collected in Batman: Private Casebook (hc, 160 pages, 2008, ISBN 1-4012-2009-6; tpb, 2009, ISBN 1-4012-2015-0)
  - Batman Confidential #31–35 (with Andy Clarke, 2009) collected as Batman: The Bat and the Beast (tpb, 128 pages, 2010, ISBN 1-4012-2794-5)
  - Batman: Legends of the Dark Knight vol. 2 #34–37: "Return of Batman..." (with Riccardo Burchielli, digital anthology, 2013)
    - First published in print as part of the twelfth and thirteenth issues of the Legends of the Dark Knight series in 2013.
    - Collected in Batman: Legends of the Dark Knight Volume 3 (tpb, 152 pages, 2014, ISBN 1-4012-4815-2)
- Animal Man #27–32 (with Chas Truog and Steve Dillon (#29), 1990–1991)
  - Collected in Animal Man: Born to be Wild (tpb, 288 pages, Vertigo, 2013, ISBN 1-4012-3801-7)
  - Collected in Animal Man by Tom Veitch and Steve Dillon Omnibus (hc, 688 pages, 2026, ISBN 1-7995-0790-4)
- Generation Hex (with Adam Pollina, one-shot, Amalgam, 1997)
  - Collected in Return to the Amalgam Age of Comics Volume 1 (tpb, 160 pages, 1997, ISBN 1-56389-382-7)
  - Collected in DC vs. Marvel: The Amalgam Age Omnibus (hc, 1,216 pages, 2024, ISBN 1-77952-326-2)
- JLA: Classified #37–41 (with Carlos D'Anda, 2007) collected as JLA: Kid Amazo! (tpb, 128 pages, 2008, ISBN 1-4012-1630-7)
  - The story was initially announced for a 2004 release in the form of an original graphic novel titled JLA: Kid Amazo (hc, 96 pages, ISBN 1-4012-0048-6)
  - The graphic novel was cancelled soon after the announcement; another delay occurred after the story was solicited to begin in JLA: Classified #26.
- The Programme (with C. P. Smith, Wildstorm, 2007–2008) collected as:
  - Volume 1 (collects #1–6, tpb, 144 pages, 2008, ISBN 1-4012-1815-6)
  - Volume 2 (collects #7–12, tpb, 144 pages, 2008, ISBN 1-4012-1998-5)
- Infinity, Inc. vol. 2:
  - Luthor's Monsters (tpb, 128 pages, 2008, ISBN 1-4012-1815-6) collects:
    - "Luthor's Monsters" (with Max Fiumara and Travel Foreman (#3), in #1–5, 2007–2008)
    - "Persona" (with Matthew Southworth, co-feature in #3–5, 2008)
  - The Bogeyman (tpb, 128 pages, 2008, ISBN 1-4012-1998-5) collects:
    - "The Influencing Machines of Metropolis" (with Matt Camp, in #6–7, 2008)
    - "The Bogeyman" (with Pete Woods, in #8–10, 2008)
  - "Schizomania" (with Javier Aranda, in #11–12, 2008)
- New Line Cinema's Tales of Horror: "The Texas Chainsaw Salesman" (with Tom Feister, co-feature in one-shot, Wildstorm, 2007)
- Flashpoint: Secret Seven #1–3 (with George Pérez (#1) and Fernando Blanco, 2011) collected in Flashpoint: The World of Flashpoint Featuring Batman (tpb, 272 pages, 2012, ISBN 1-4012-3405-4)
- Red Lanterns (with Ed Benes, Diego Bernard (#4–7), Jorge Jiménez (#8), Andres Guinaldo (#8 and 16), Tomás Giorello (#9), Miguel Sepulveda, Ardian Syaf (#0) and Will Conrad (#19–20), 2011–2013) collected as:
  - Blood and Rage (collects #1–7, tpb, 160 pages, 2012, ISBN 1-4012-3491-7)
  - Death of the Red Lanterns (collects #8–12 and Stormwatch vol. 5 #9, tpb, 144 pages, 2013, ISBN 1-4012-3847-5)
  - The Second Prophecy (collects #0 and 13–20, tpb, 272 pages, 2013, ISBN 1-4012-4414-9)
  - The New 52 Omnibus (includes #0–20 and Stormwatch vol. 5 #9, hc, 1,456 pages, 2026, ISBN 1-7995-0176-0)
- Justice League Dark (with Mikel Janín, Admira Wijaya (#7) and Daniel Sampere (#7–8), 2011–2012) collected as:
  - In the Dark (collects #1–6, tpb, 144 pages, 2012, ISBN 1-4012-3704-5)
  - The Books of Magic (includes #7–8, tpb, 224 pages, 2013, ISBN 1-4012-4024-0)
  - The New 52 Omnibus (includes #1–8, hc, 1,648 pages, 2021, ISBN 1-77951-313-5)
  - The New 52 Compendium (includes #1–8, hc, 1,624 pages, 2026, ISBN 1-79950-667-3)
- Stormwatch vol. 5 (with Miguel Sepulveda (#9), Ignacio Calero (#10–11), Eduardo Pansica (#11 and 16), Will Conrad, Julio Ferreira (#12 and 16) and Cliff Richards (#13–15), 2012–2013) collected as:
  - Enemies of Earth (includes #9–12 and Red Lanterns #10, tpb, 160 pages, 2013, ISBN 1-4012-3848-3)
  - Betrayal (collects #0 and 13–18, tpb, 176 pages, 2013, ISBN 1-4012-4315-0)
    - Includes the "Seoul Brothers" short story (art by Simon Bisley) from Young Romance: A New 52 Valentine's Day Special (anthology, 2013)
- Adventures of Superman vol. 2 #34–36: "The Demolisher" (with Agustín Padilla, digital anthology, 2013)
  - First published in print as the twelfth issue of the Adventures of Superman series in 2014.
  - Collected in Adventures of Superman Volume 3 (tpb, 160 pages, 2014, ISBN 1-4012-5330-X)

==== Vertigo ====
Titles published by DC Comics' Vertigo imprint include:

- Enigma #1–8 (with Duncan Fegredo, 1993) collected as Enigma (tpb, 208 pages, 1995, ISBN 1-56389-192-1; hc, 264 pages, Dark Horse, 2021, ISBN 1-5067-2069-2)
- The Extremist #1–4 (with Ted McKeever, 1993)
- Vertigo Voices (umbrella title for a series of one-shots):
  - Face (with Duncan Fegredo, 1995)
  - The Eaters (with Dean Ormston, 1996)
  - Bizarre Boys (unproduced one-shot — to be co-written by Milligan with Grant Morrison and drawn by Jamie Hewlett)
- Tank Girl:
  - Tank Girl: The Movie Adaptation (with Andy Pritchett, graphic novel, 64 pages, 1995, ISBN 1-56389-219-7)
  - Tank Girl: The Odyssey #1–4 (with Jamie Hewlett, 1995) collected as Tank Girl: The Odyssey (tpb, 104 pages, Titan, 2003, ISBN 1-84023-494-6)
- Egypt #1–7 (with Glyn Dillon (#1–2) and Roberto Corona, 1995–1996)
  - A collected edition was solicited for a 2016 release but subsequently cancelled: Egypt (tpb, 192 pages, ISBN 1-4012-6136-1)
- Vertigo Vérité: Girl #1–3 (with Duncan Fegredo, 1996) collected as Girl (tpb, 80 pages, DC Black Label, 2020, ISBN 1-77950-818-2)
- Weird War Tales vol. 2 #4: "War + Peas" (with Duncan Fegredo, anthology, 1997)
- The Minx (with Sean Phillips):
  - Vertigo: Winter's Edge #1: "Mazel Tov, Leo" (short story in the anthology, 1998)
  - The Minx #1–8 (1998–1999)
  - Vertigo: Winter's Edge #2 (framing sequence for the anthology, 1999)
- Heart Throbs vol. 2 #3: "The Death of a Romantic" (with Eduardo Risso, anthology, 1999)
- Human Target:
  - Human Target: Chance Meetings (tpb, 200 pages, 2010, ISBN 1-4012-2666-3) collects:
    - Human Target #1–4 (with Edvin Biuković, 1999) also collected as Human Target (tpb, 104 pages, 2000, ISBN 1-56389-693-1)
    - Human Target: Final Cut (with Javier Pulido, graphic novel, hc, 96 pages, 2002, ISBN 1-56389-889-6; sc, 2003, ISBN 1-56389-904-3)
  - Human Target vol. 2 #1–21 (with Javier Pulido (#1–5, 11–13, 18), Cliff Chiang (#6–10, 14–16, 19–21) and Cameron Stewart (#17), 2003–2005)
    - Issues #1–10 are collected as Human Target: Second Chances (tpb, 256 pages, 2011, ISBN 1-4012-3061-X)
- Weird Western Tales vol. 2 #4: "What a Man's Gotta Do" (with Duncan Fegredo, anthology, 2001)
- Vertigo Pop! London #1–4: "My Generation" (with Philip Bond, 2003)
- Hellblazer:
  - Hellblazer (with Eddie Campbell (#250), Giuseppe Camuncoli, Goran Sudžuka (#254–255), Simon Bisley (#259–260, 265–266, 271–274, 276, 282, 292) and Gael Bertrand (#280, 284, 291), 2009–2013) collected as:
    - John Constantine, Hellblazer Volume 22 (collects #250–260, tpb, 392 pages, 2020, ISBN 1-4012-9568-1)
    - John Constantine, Hellblazer Volume 23 (includes #261–266, tpb, 392 pages, 2020, ISBN 1-77950-305-9)
    - John Constantine, Hellblazer Volume 24 (includes #267–275, tpb, 352 pages, 2021, ISBN 1-77950-952-9)
    - John Constantine, Hellblazer Volume 25 (collects #276–291, tpb, 352 pages, 2021, ISBN 1-77951-029-2)
    - John Constantine, Hellblazer Volume 26 (collects #292–300 and Annual #1, tpb, 352 pages, 2022, ISBN 1-77951-498-0)
  - House of Mystery Halloween Annual (with Giuseppe Camuncoli):
    - "Letter from a Suicide" (co-feature in #1, 2009) collected in House of Mystery: The Beauty of Decay (tpb, 160 pages, 2010, ISBN 1-4012-2756-2)
    - "Bonfire Night" (co-feature in #2, 2010) collected in House of Mystery: Conception (tpb, 160 pages, 2012, ISBN 1-4012-3264-7)
- Greek Street (with Davide Gianfelice and Werther Dell'Edera (#12–14), 2009–2010) collected as:
  - Blood Calls for Blood (collects #1–5, tpb, 144 pages, 2010, ISBN 1-4012-2573-X)
  - Cassandra Complex (collects #6–11, tpb, 144 pages, 2010, ISBN 1-4012-2847-X)
  - Madea's Luck (collects #12–16, tpb, 128 pages, 2011, ISBN 1-4012-3280-9)
- Vertigo Crime: The Bronx Kill (with James Romberger, graphic novel, hc, 184 pages, 2010, ISBN 1-84856-418-X; sc, 2011, ISBN 1-4012-2631-0)
- Strange Adventures: "P•A•R•T•N•E•R•S" (with Sylvain Savoia, anthology one-shot, 2011) collected in Strange Adventures (tpb, 160 pages, 2014, ISBN 1-4012-4393-2)
- Time Warp: "She's Not There" (with M. K. Perker, anthology one-shot, 2013)
- Vertigo Quarterly (series of bimonthly themed anthologies):
  - CMYK #2: "The Shoe in the Attic" (with Rufus Dayglo, 2014) collected in CMYK (tpb, 296 pages, 2015, ISBN 1-4012-5336-9)
  - SFX #1: "Pop Psychology" (with Celia Calle, 2015) collected in SFX (tpb, 296 pages, 2016, ISBN 1-4012-6147-7)
- The Names #1–9 (with Leandro Fernández, 2014–2015) collected as The Names (tpb, 200 pages, 2015, ISBN 1-4012-5243-5)
- New Romancer #1–6 (with Brett Parson, 2016) collected as New Romancer (tpb, 144 pages, 2016, ISBN 1-4012-6351-8)

=== Marvel Comics ===
Titles published by Marvel and its various imprints include:

- A1 vol. 2 #2–4: "King Leon" (with Jamie Hewlett, anthology, Epic, 1992)
- X-Men:
  - Archangel: "Phantom Wings" (with Leonardo Manco, one-shot, 1996) collected in X-Men: The Road to Onslaught Volume 3 (tpb, 448 pages, 2015, ISBN 0-7851-9005-8)
  - The Further Adventures of Cyclops and Phoenix #1–4 (with John Paul Leon, 1996)
    - Collected as The Further Adventures of Cyclops and Phoenix (tpb, 112 pages, 1997, ISBN 0-7851-0556-5)
    - Collected in X-Men: The Rise of Apocalypse (tpb, 400 pages, 2016, ISBN 1-302-90069-2)
  - Magneto #1–4 (scripted by Jorge González from a plot by Milligan, drawn by Kelley Jones, 1996–1997)
  - X-Statix Omnibus (hc, 1,200 pages, 2011, ISBN 0-7851-5844-8) collects:
    - X-Force #116–129 (with Mike Allred, Darwyn Cooke (#124) and Duncan Fegredo (#129), 2001–2002)
      - Also collected as X-Force: Famous, Mutant and Mortal (hc, 288 pages, 2003, ISBN 0-7851-1023-2)
      - Also collected in X-Statix: The Complete Collection Volume 1 (tpb, 504 pages, 2020, ISBN 1-302-92403-6)
    - X-Statix (with Mike Allred, Paul Pope (#5), Philip Bond (#10) and Nick Dragotta (#20), 2002–2004) also collected as:
      - Good Omens (collects #1–5, tpb, 128 pages, 2003, ISBN 0-7851-1059-3)
      - Good Guys and Bad Guys (collects #6–10, tpb, 176 pages, 2003, ISBN 0-7851-1139-5)
        - Includes the 2-issue spin-off limited series Wolverine/Doop (written by Milligan, art by Darwyn Cooke, 2003)
      - Back from the Dead (collects #11–18, tpb, 192 pages, 2004, ISBN 0-7851-1140-9)
      - X-Statix vs. the Avengers (collects #19–26, tpb, 192 pages, 2004, ISBN 0-7851-1537-4)
    - I ♥ Marvel: My Mutant Heart: "How Love Works" (with Marcos Martín, anthology one-shot, 2006)
    - X-Statix Presents: Dead Girl #1–5 (with Nick Dragotta, Marvel Knights, 2006) also collected as X-Statix Presents: Dead Girl (tpb, 120 pages, 2006, ISBN 0-7851-2031-9)
    - Nation X #4: "Dooptopia" (with Mike Allred, anthology, 2010) also collected in Nation X (hc, 360 pages, 2010, ISBN 0-7851-3873-0; tpb, 2010, ISBN 0-7851-4103-0)
  - X-Men vol. 2 (with Salvador Larroca and Roger Cruz (#180–181), 2005–2006) collected as:
    - X-Men by Peter Milligan: Dangerous Liaisons (collects #166–176, tpb, 320 pages, 2019, ISBN 1-302-91650-5)
    - X-Men by Peter Milligan: Blood of Apocalypse (collects #177–187, tpb, 336 pages, 2022, ISBN 1-302-93090-7)
  - All-New Doop #1–5 (with David Lafuente, Jacopo Camagni (#3) and Federico Santagati (#4–5), 2014) collected as All-New Doop (tpb, 112 pages, 2014, ISBN 0-7851-9042-2)
  - Legion #1–5 (with Wilfredo Torres and Lee Ferguson (#4–5), 2018) collected as Legion: Trauma (tpb, 112 pages, 2018, ISBN 1-302-91162-7)
  - The X-Cellent: Hereditary-X (tpb, 152 pages, 2022, ISBN 1-302-91698-X) collects:
    - Giant-Size X-Statix: "Hereditary-X" (with Mike Allred, 2019)
    - The X-Cellent #1–5: "New Blood, New World" (with Mike Allred, 2022)
  - The X-Cellent vol. 2 #1–5 (with Mike Allred, 2023) collected as The X-Cellent: Unsocial Media (tpb, 112 pages, 2023, ISBN 1-302-91699-8)
- Elektra #1–13, -1 (with Mike Deodato, Jr., 1996–1997) collected in Elektra by Peter Milligan, Larry Hama and Mike Deodato, Jr.: The Complete Collection (tpb, 480 pages, 2017, ISBN 1-302-90433-7)
- Spider-Man:
  - Spider-Man's Tangled Web #5–6: "Flowers for Rhino" (with Duncan Fegredo, anthology, 2001)
    - Collected in Spider-Man's Tangled Web Volume 1 (tpb, 144 pages, 2002, ISBN 0-7851-0803-3)
    - Collected in Spider-Man's Tangled Web Omnibus (hc, 560 pages, 2017, ISBN 1-302-90682-8)
  - Venom vs. Carnage #1–4 (with Clayton Crain, 2004)
    - Collected as Venom vs. Carnage (tpb, 96 pages, 2004, ISBN 0-7851-1524-2)
    - Collected in Carnage Omnibus (hc, 1,168 pages, 2018, ISBN 1-302-91227-5)
    - Collected in Venomnibus Volume 3 (hc, 1,088 pages, 2020, ISBN 1-302-92632-2)
  - Toxin #1–6 (with Darick Robertson, 2005) collected as Toxin: The Devil You Know (tpb, 144 pages, 2005, ISBN 0-7851-1804-7)
- Punisher:
  - Wolverine/Punisher #1–5 (with Lee Weeks, Marvel Knights, 2004) collected as Wolverine/Punisher (tpb, 120 pages, 2004, ISBN 0-7851-1432-7)
  - The Punisher: Official Movie Adaptation #1–3 (with Pat Olliffe, 2004) collected as The Punisher: Official Movie Adaptation (tpb, 120 pages, 2004, ISBN 0-7851-1410-6)
  - The Punisher: Frank Castle #75: "Father's Day" (with Goran Parlov, co-feature, Marvel MAX, 2009) collected in Punisher MAX: The Complete Collection Volume 5 (tpb, 504 pages, 2017, ISBN 1-302-90274-1)
  - Punisher MAX: Happy Ending (with Juan José Ryp, one-shot, Marvel MAX, 2010) collected in Punisher MAX: The Complete Collection Volume 6 (tpb, 376 pages, 2017, ISBN 1-302-90739-5)
- Sub-Mariner: The Depths #1–5 (with Esad Ribić, Marvel Knights, 2008–2009) collected as Sub-Mariner: The Depths (hc, 120 pages, 2009, ISBN 0-7851-3329-1; tpb, 2009, ISBN 0-7851-3337-2)
- Moon Knight: Silent Knight (with Laurence Campbell, one-shot, 2009)
  - Collected in Moon Knight: The Death of Marc Spector (hc, 152 pages, 2009, ISBN 0-7851-3218-X; tpb, 2009, ISBN 0-7851-3298-8)
  - Collected in Moon Knight by Huston, Benson and Hurwitz Omnibus (hc, 1,184 pages, 2022, ISBN 1-302-93456-2)
- Thor: The Trial of Thor (tpb, 288 pages, 2017, ISBN 1-302-90795-6) includes:
  - Dark Reign: The Cabal: "Dinner with Doom" (with Tonči Zonjić, anthology one-shot, 2009) also collected in Siege Prelude (tpb, 264 pages, 2010, ISBN 0-7851-4310-6)
  - The Trial of Thor (with Cary Nord, one-shot, 2009)
  - Thor vol. 3 Annual #1: "The Hand of Grog" (with Tom Grindberg and Mico Suayan, 2009) also collected in Thor: Wolves of the North (tpb, 104 pages, 2011, ISBN 0-7851-5614-3)
  - The Rage of Thor (with Mico Suayan, one-shot, 2010)
- The Mystic Hands of Doctor Strange: "Melancholia" (with Frank Brunner, anthology one-shot, 2010) collected in Doctor Strange: The Flight of Bones (tpb, 192 pages, 2016, ISBN 1-302-90167-2)
- Daredevil: Black and White: "Second Sight" (with Jason Latour, anthology one-shot, 2010)
- 5 Ronin #1–5 (with Tomm Coker (#1), Dalibor Talajić (#2), Laurence Campbell (#3), Goran Parlov (#4) and Leandro Fernández (#5), 2011) collected as 5 Ronin (hc, 136 pages, 2011, ISBN 0-7851-5632-1; tpb, 2011, ISBN 0-7851-5101-X)
- Fear Itself: Home Front #1–4: "The Age of Anxiety" (with Elia Bonetti, anthology, 2011) collected in Fear Itself: Home Front (hc, 240 pages, 2012, ISBN 0-7851-6389-1; tpb, 2012, ISBN 0-7851-5667-4)
- Kiss Kiss Bang Bang vol. 2 (with Ramon Rosanas, unreleased 4-issue limited series intended for publication under the CrossGen imprint — initially announced for December 2011; postponed indefinitely in March 2012)
- All-New Miracleman Annual: "Seriously Miraculous" (with Mike Allred, co-feature, 2015) collected in Miracleman: Olympus (hc, 328 pages, 2015, ISBN 0-7851-5466-3)

=== Valiant Comics ===
Titles published by Valiant include:

- Shadowman: The Deluxe Edition Book Two (hc, 304 pages, 2017, ISBN 1-68215-107-7) collects:
  - Shadowman vol. 4 #13X, 13–16 (with Diego Bernard (#13X) and Roberto de la Torre, 2013–2014) also collected as Shadowman: Fear, Blood and Shadows (tpb, 112 pages, 2014, ISBN 1-939346-27-4)
  - Shadowman: End Times #1–3 (with Valentine De Landro, 2014) also collected as Shadowman: End Times (tpb, 104 pages, 2014, ISBN 1-939346-37-1)
  - Punk Mambo: "Mayhem and Revenge" (with Robert Gill, one-shot, 2014) also collected in Punk Mambo (tpb, 144 pages, 2019, ISBN 1-68215-330-4)
- Bloodshot vol. 3 #25: "The Glitch" (with Lewis LaRosa, 2014) collected in Bloodshot: The Glitch and Other Tales (tpb, 112 pages, 2015, ISBN 1-939346-71-1)
- Eternal Warrior: Days of Steel #1–3 (with Cary Nord, 2014–2015) collected as Eternal Warrior: Days of Steel (tpb, 104 pages, 2015, ISBN 1-939346-74-6)
- Britannia:
  - Britannia: The Deluxe Edition (hc, 320 pages, 2019, ISBN 1-68215-320-7) collects:
    - Britannia #1–4 (with Juan José Ryp, 2016) also collected as Britannia (tpb, 112 pages, 2017, ISBN 1-68215-185-9)
    - Britannia: We Who are About to Die #1–4 (with Juan José Ryp, 2017) also collected as Britannia: We Who are About to Die (tpb, 112 pages, 2017, ISBN 1-68215-213-8)
    - Britannia: Lost Eagles of Rome #1–4 (with Robert Gill, 2018) also collected as Britannia: Lost Eagles of Rome (tpb, 112 pages, 2018, ISBN 1-68215-291-X)
  - Britannia: The Great Fire of Rome (with Alvaro Papagiani, one-shot, 2024)
- Punk Mambo: The Punk Witch Project (with Andres Ponce, one-shot, 2024)
- X-O Manowar: Black, White and Gold #1: "Visigoth Therapy" (with Sebastián Cabrol, anthology, 2026) collected in X-O Manowar: Black, White and Gold (hc, 112 pages, 2027, ISBN 1-9622-0175-9)

=== Other ===
Titles published by various American publishers after Milligan became an established Big Two writer:

- Dark Horse:
  - Aliens vol. 2 #9–12: "Aliens: Sacrifice" (with Paul Johnson, strip in the magazine, 1993)
    - Collected by Dark Horse in Aliens Omnibus Volume 3 (tpb, 376 pages, 2008, ISBN 1-59307-872-2)
    - Collected by Marvel in Aliens: The Original Years Omnibus Volume 2 (hc, 1,032 pages, 2022, ISBN 1-302-92890-2)
  - Tomorrow #1–2 (of 5) (with Jesús Hervás, Berger Books, 2020)
    - The last three issues of the series were cancelled as a result of the COVID-19 pandemic.
    - The entire story was eventually published as a single volume titled Tomorrow (tpb, 128 pages, 2020, ISBN 1-5067-1803-5)
- The Dark Gate: "The Hunger Artists" (with Brett Ewins, anthology graphic novel, 64 pages, Cyberosia, 2004, ISBN 0-9742713-6-5)
- IDW Publishing:
  - Army of Two #1–6: "Across the Border" (with Dexter Soy, EA Comics, 2010) collected as Army of Two (tpb, 144 pages, 2010, ISBN 1-60010-739-7)
  - Kid Lobotomy #1–6 (with Tess Fowler, Black Crown, 2017–2018) collected as Kid Lobotomy: A Lad Insane (tpb, 152 pages, 2018, ISBN 1-68405-244-0)
  - Black Crown Quarterly #3: "Tales from the Raygun" (with Kristian Rossi, anthology, 2018) collected in Black Crown Omnibus (tpb, 240 pages, 2018, ISBN 1-68405-364-1)
- After Dark #0–3 (script by Milligan based on the concept by Antoine Fuqua and Wesley Snipes, art by Jeff Nentrup and Leonardo Manco (#2–3), Radical, 2010–2011)
  - A collected edition was solicited for a 2011 release but subsequently cancelled: After Dark (tpb, 168 pages, ISBN 1-935417-45-2)
- Image:
  - Madman 20th Anniversary Monster: "Tuning Up" (with Philip Bond, anthology graphic novel, 264 pages, 2011, ISBN 1-60706-472-3)
  - The Discipline #1–6 (with Leandro Fernández, 2016) collected as The Discipline (tpb, 160 pages, 2016, ISBN 1-63215-922-8)
  - Hit-Girl: Season Two #9–12: "India" (with Alison Sampson, 2019–2020) collected as Hit-Girl in India (tpb, 104 pages, 2020, ISBN 1-5343-1548-9)
- Terminal Hero #1–6 (with Piotr Kowalski, Dynamite, 2014–2015) collected as Terminal Hero: The Death and Life of Rory Fletcher (tpb, 144 pages, 2015, ISBN 1-60690-697-6)
- Ahoy Comics:
  - Edgar Allan Poe's Snifter of Terror Volume 1 (tpb, 192 pages, 2019, ISBN 0-9980442-3-7) includes:
    - Edgar Allan Poe's Snifter of Terror (anthology):
      - "The Fall of the White House of President Usher" (with Richard Case, in #5, 2019)
      - "William Wilson, Inc." (with Sarah Burrini, in #6, 2019)
  - Happy Hour #1–6 (with Michael Montenat, 2020–2021) collected as Happy Hour (tpb, 144 pages, 2021, ISBN 1-952090-05-9)
- AWA Studios:
  - American Ronin #1–5 (with Aco, 2020–2021) collected as American Ronin (tpb, 128 pages, 2021, ISBN 1-953165-04-4)
  - Absolution #1–5 (with Mike Deodato, Jr., 2022) collected as Absolution (tpb, 128 pages, 2023, ISBN 1-953165-42-7)
  - Sacrament #1–5 (with Marcelo Frusin, 2022) collected as Sacrament (tpb, 128 pages, 2023, ISBN 1-953165-43-5)
- Aftershock:
  - Out of Body #1–5 (with Inaki Miranda, 2021) collected as Out of Body (tpb, 120 pages, 2023, ISBN 1-949028-86-0)
  - God of Tremors (with Piotr Kowalski, one-shot, 2021) collected in Shock Treatment (tpb, 136 pages, 2022, ISBN 1-949028-92-5)
  - Dogs of London #1–5 (with Artecida, 2022) collected as Dogs of London (tpb, 128 pages, 2023, ISBN 1-956731-13-X)
- Bad Idea:
  - Pyrate Queen #1–4 (with Adam Pollina, 2021–2022)
  - The Lot #3: "Monsters in My Life" (with Sarah Burrini, co-feature, 2021)
  - Werewolf (with Robert Gill, one-shot — distributed directly by the publisher via mail order, 2021)
  - Burning Man #1 (of 2) (with Juan José Ryp, 2022)
    - The storyline was supposed to continue in several co-features published in other titles by Bad Idea before concluding in Burning Man #2.
    - Due to publishing delays and other undisclosed reasons, none of the further short installments or full issues of Burning Man eventually materialized.
- Human Remains #1–8 (with Sally Cantirino, Vault, 2021–2022) collected as Human Remains: The Complete Series (tpb, 192 pages, 2022, ISBN 1-63849-110-0)
- The Most Important Comic Book on Earth: "Humanity: Annual Report" (with Guillermo Ortego, anthology graphic novel, 352 pages, DK Publishing, 2021, ISBN 0-7440-4282-8)
- Profane #1–5 (with Raül Fernández, Boom! Studios, 2024) collected as Profane (tpb, 128 pages, 2025, ISBN 979-8892151085)
- Mad Cave Studios:
  - The Pale Knight #1–6 (with Val Rodrigues, 2025) collected as The Pale Knight (tpb, 152 pages, 2025, ISBN 1-5458-1260-8)
  - Liquidator #1–5 (with Piotr Kowalski, 2025–2026) collected as Liquidator (tpb, 120 pages, 2026, ISBN 1-9605-7873-1)
- Heavy Metal Magazine #5: "Sick Futures: The Man Who Once Was" (with Goran Sudžuka, anthology, Massive Publishing, 2026)
