= UK Comic Art Award =

Series of British awards

- Country: United Kingdom
- Hosted by: Glasgow Comic Art Convention (1991–1995); United Kingdom Comic Art Convention (1997)
- First award: 1990
- Final award: 1997

The UK Comic Art Award was a series of British awards for achievement in comic books. Winners were selected by an open vote among British comic book professionals (creators, editors, and retailers); the awards were given out on an annual basis from 1990 to 1997 for comics published in the United Kingdom the previous year. Award presentations were generally held at the Glasgow Comic Art Convention, usually in the spring.

The UK Comic Art Award took the place of the Eagle Award, a fan-voted award which had petered out by the end of the 1980s. The National Comics Awards took over for the UK Comic Art Award in 1997 (the National Comic Awards were themselves replaced by the rejuvenated Eagle Awards in the 2000s).

== History ==
The Awards were founded in 1990 by Rusty Staples (Frank Plowright, Hassan Yussuf, and Richard Barker), the company responsible for organizing the United Kingdom Comic Art Convention (UKCAC). The awards were generally sponsored by Penguin Books UK.

The 1991 awards presentation was held at the Glasgow Comic Art Convention (GlasCAC) in late March. The 1993 awards presentation was again held in March at GlasCAC, Glasgow City Halls. The fifth annual UK Comic Art Awards were presented at GlasCAC on Sunday, March 20, 1994. The 1997 awards were presented at the UKCAC, at the UCL Institute of Education, London, on Sunday, March 16.

== Awards ==
Winners listed by year; for some categories, other nominees are listed after the winner.

=== Best Writer ===
- 1990: Grant Morrison
- 1991: Peter Milligan
- 1992: John Wagner
- 1993: Peter David
  - Jamie Delano
  - Peter Milligan
- 1994: Peter Milligan (Shade, the Changing Man, Enigma, The Extremist)
- 1997: Garth Ennis (Hitman, Preacher, Saint of Killers)
  - Grant Morrison
  - Alan Moore

=== Best Artist ===
- 1990: Simon Bisley
- 1991: John Higgins
- 1992: Simon Bisley
- 1993: Colin MacNeil
  - John M. Burns
  - Simon Bisley
  - Sean Phillips
- 1994: Duncan Fegredo (Enigma, Shade covers)
- 1997: Steve Dillon (Preacher)
  - Adam Hughes
  - Mike Mignola

=== Best Ink Artist ===
- 1997: Mark Farmer (The Incredible Hulk, Legion of Super-Heroes)
  - Bill Sienkiewicz
  - Mark Buckingham

=== Best Cover Artist ===
- 1997: Glenn Fabry (Preacher)
  - Alex Ross
  - Jason Brashill

=== Best Writer/Artist ===
- 1990: Peter Bagge
- 1991: Kyle Baker
  - Moebius
- 1992: Frank Miller
  - Peter Bagge
  - Ted McKeever
- 1993: Frank Miller
  - Peter Bagge
  - Alan Davis
- 1994: Frank Miller (Sin City, writer on Man Without Fear)
- 1997: Mike Mignola (Hellboy)
  - David Lapham
  - Daniel Clowes

=== Best Newcomer ===
- 1991: Mark Millar (writer, Saviour and Insiders)
- 1993: Joe Quesada
  - Chris Halls
  - Travis Charest
- 1994: Frank Quitely (Shimura, The Missionary Man)
- 1997: Jim Murray (Judge Dredd)
  - Pop Mahn
  - Andy Pritchett

=== Best Auxiliary Contributor ===
- 1990: Paul Gravett
- 1991: Dave Elliott (editor, A1)
- 1993: Steve Oliff (colorist)
  - Tim Quinn (editor, Marvel UK)
  - Dave Elliott (publisher, Atomeka Press)
- 1994: Ellie DeVille (letterer)
- 1997: Matt Hollingsworth (colorist, Preacher)
  - Joe Chiodo
  - Ellie DeVille

=== Best Publisher ===
- 1990: DC Comics
- 1991: DC Comics
- 1993: DC Comics
  - Fleetway Publications
  - Dark Horse Comics
- 1994: DC Comics

=== Best Character ===
- 1990: Tank Girl (Deadline)
- 1991: Buddy Bradley (Hate)

=== Best Original Graphic Novel/One-Shot ===
- 1990: Arkham Asylum (Grant Morrison and Dave McKean)
- 1991: Elektra Lives Again (Frank Miller and Lynn Varley)
- 1992: Judgment on Gotham (John Wagner, Alan Grant, and Simon Bisley)
- 1993: Night Cries (Archie Goodwin and Scott Hampton)
  - Tell Me Dark (Karl Edward Wagner, John Ney Rieger, and Kent Williams)
  - Skin (Peter Milligan, Brendan McCarthy, and Carol Swain)
- 1994: Vendetta in Gotham (John Wagner, Alan Grant, and Cam Kennedy)
- 1996: Stuck Rubber Baby (Howard Cruse)
- 1997: The End of the Century Club (Ed Hillyer)
  - Preacher Special (Garth Ennis and Steve Dillon)
  - Suckle (Dave Cooper)

=== Best Graphic Novel Collection/Best Collection ===
- 1990: Ed the Happy Clown (Chester Brown)
- 1991: The Complete Alec (Eddie Campbell)
- 1992: Judge Dredd in America (John Wagner and Colin MacNeil)
  - Maus II (Art Spiegelman)
  - Eddy Current (Ted McKeever)
- 1993: Sin City (Frank Miller)
  - Killing Time (John Smith and Chris Weston)
  - The Sandman: Season of Mists (Neil Gaiman, et al.)
- 1994: Hugo Tate, O America (Nick Abadzis)
- 1997: Preacher: Gone to Texas (Garth Ennis and Steve Dillon)
  - Stray Bullets: Innocence of Nihilism (David Lapham)
  - The Invisibles: Say You Want a Revolution (Grant Morrison and Steve Yeowell)

=== Best Translated Graphic Novel ===
- 1990: Lea: The Confessions of Julius Antoine (Serge Le Tendre and Christian Rossi)
- 1991: Blueberry (Jean-Michel Charlier and Jean “Moebius” Giraud)
- 1992: Heart Throbs (Max Cabanes)

=== Best Ongoing Publication ===
- 1990: Viz
- 1991: Viz
- 1992: Judge Dredd Megazine
  - 2000 AD
  - Hate
  - Viz
- 1993: Judge Dredd Megazine
  - Eightball
  - 2000 AD
- 1994: Judge Dredd Megazine
- 1997: Preacher
  - 2000 AD
  - Acme Novelty Library

=== Best New Publication ===
- 1990: Bogey Man
- 1991: Revolver
- 1992: Blast!
- 1993: Archer & Armstrong
  - Red Dwarf (Fleetway)
  - The Heckler
  - Overkill
- 1994: Man Without Fear (Marvel)
- 1995: The Tale of One Bad Rat
- 1997: Kingdom Come
  - Girl
  - Superman Adventures

=== Biggest Influence on Comics ===
- 1990: Batman

=== Career Achievement Award ===
- 1990: Jack Kirby
- 1991: Steve Ditko
- 1992: John Wagner
- 1993: John M. Burns
  - Will Eisner
  - Brian Bolland
- 1994: Will Eisner
- 1997: Joe Kubert
  - Robert Crumb
  - Alex Toth

== See also ==
- Ally Sloper Award
- Eagle Award
- National Comics Awards
