= Duncan Fegredo =

British comic book artist (born 1964)

- Born: 1964 (age 61–62) Leicester, England
- Areas: Penciller, Inker
- Notable works: Enigma; Hellboy: Darkness Calls

Duncan Fegredo (/fəˈɡreɪdoʊ/; born 1964) is a British comic book artist.

== Career ==
Born in Leicester, Fegredo first managed to get into comics after showing his portfolio around UKCAC in 1987 and meeting Dave Thorpe. Together they worked on a strip for a short lived British magazine called Heartbreak Hotel. After this, Fegredo worked at Crisis for Fleetway before working on Kid Eternity at DC Comics with writer Grant Morrison. He then worked with writer Peter Milligan on Enigma, an eight-issue miniseries for DC's Vertigo imprint. At 2000 AD he worked on Judge Dredd and a couple of other titles.

Other work includes the comic-book versions of Kevin Smith's Jay and Silent Bob characters, Shade the Changing Man and Ultimate Adventures

For a few years, Duncan Fegredo was the regular artist on Dark Horse's Hellboy series. Fegredo's six-issue miniseries, Hellboy: Darkness Calls, was the first Hellboy miniseries that did not feature Hellboy creator Mike Mignola on art (Mignola plotted the book). Fegredo went on to do the art for the short story Hellboy: The Mole, the eight-issue miniseries Hellboy: The Wild Hunt, and the miniseries The Storm and The Fury (both three issues). The Fury was his final story as the regular artist, with Mike Mignola returning for the next miniseries.

On 9 April 2011, Fegredo was one of 62 comics creators who appeared at the IGN stage at the Kapow! convention in London to set two Guinness World Records, the Fastest Production of a Comic Book, and Most Contributors to a Comic Book. With Guinness officials on hand to monitor their progress, writer Mark Millar began work at 9am scripting a 20-page black and white Superior comic book, with Fegredo and the other artists appearing on stage throughout the day to work on the pencils, inks, and lettering, including Dave Gibbons, Frank Quitely, John Romita Jr., Jock, Doug Braithwaite, Ian Churchill, Olivier Coipel, Simon Furman, David Lafuente, John McCrea, Sean Phillips and Liam Sharp, who all drew a panel each, with regular Superior artist Leinil Yu creating the book's front cover. The book was completed in 11 hours, 19 minutes, and 38 seconds, and was published through Icon on 23 November 2011, with all royalties being donated to Yorkhill Children's Foundation.

== Awards ==
- 2001: Nominated for "Best Cover Artist" Eisner Award, for Lucifer
- 2007: Won "Favourite Colour Comicbook – American" Eagle Award, for Hellboy: Darkness Calls
- 2011: Nominated for "Comic Book Illustration" National Cartoonist Society for Hellboy: The Fury

== Bibliography ==
=== Interior work ===
- Repossession Blues (with Dave Thorpe, strip in Heartbreak Hotel, 1987–1988)
- Crisis (Fleetway):
  - New Statesmen (with John Smith, in #7–8, 1988)
  - Third World War: "Liat's Law" (with Pat Mills and Alan Mitchell, in No. 19 and 26, 1989)
- Kid Eternity #1–3 (with Grant Morrison, DC Comics, 1991)
- Enigma (with Peter Milligan, Vertigo, 1993)
- Vertigo Jam: "Kid Eternity: He Who Falls" (with Ann Nocenti, one-shot, 1993)
- Absolute Vertigo: "King Mob: Hexy" (with Grant Morrison, one-shot, Ver6-7tigo, 1995)
- Vertigo Voices: Face (with Peter Milligan, one-shot, Vertigo, 1995)
- Millennium Fever #1–4 (with Nick Abadzis, Vertigo, 1995–1996)
- Vertigo Vérité: Girl (with Peter Milligan, Vertigo, 1996)
- House of Secrets #6: "Meeting: An Other Rooms Story" (with Steven T. Seagle, Vertigo, 1997)
- The Batman Chronicles #9: "Photo Finish" (with Devin Grayson, DC Comics, 1997)
- Aliens: Havoc No. 1 (with Mark Schultz, among other artists, Dark Horse, 1997)
- Weird War Tales #4: "War & Peas" (with Peter Milligan, Vertigo, 1997)
- Vertigo: Winter's Edge #1: "Deck the Halls" (with Peter Hogan and Caitlín R. Kiernan, Vertigo, 1998)
- Scarecrow: "Mistress of Fear" (with Peter Milligan, one-shot, DC Comics, 1998)
- Jay & Silent Bob (with Kevin Smith, Oni Press, 1998–1999)
- The Dreaming (with Caitlín R. Kiernan, Vertigo):
  - "Restitution" (in No. 26, 1998)
  - "Restoration" (with Marc Hempel, Shawn McManus and John Totleben, in No. 50, 2000)
- Grendel: Black, White & Red #1: "Devil's Tongue" (with Matt Wagner, Dark Horse, 1998)
- Flinch #6: "Dead Woman Walking" (with William Messner-Loebs, Vertigo, 1999)
- V2K: Totems (with Tom Peyer, Richard Case and Dean Ormston, graphic novel, Vertigo, 2000)
- Judge Dredd Megazine vol. 3 #64: "Dead Ringer" (with John Wagner, Fleetway, 2000)
- Before the Fantastic Four: Reed Richards #1–3 (with Peter David, Marvel, 2000)
- 2000 AD #1227, 1240: "Judge Dredd" (with John Wagner, Rebellion Developments, 2001)
- Weird Western Tales #4: "What a Man's Gotta Do" (with Peter Milligan, Vertigo, 2001)
- Spider-Man's Tangled Web (Marvel):
  - "Flowers for Rhino" (with Peter Milligan, in #5–6, 2001)
  - "I was a Teenage Frog-Man" (with Zeb Wells, in No. 12, 2002)
- X-Force #129: "X-Storm!" (with Peter Milligan, Marvel, 2002)
- Ultimate Adventures (with Ron Zimmerman, Marvel, 2002–2003)
- Tom Strong #29–30: "The Terrible True Life of Tom Strong" (with Ed Brubaker, America's Best Comics, 2004–2005)
- Books of Magick: Life During Wartime No. 6 and 10: "Tumbling Dice" (with Si Spencer, Vertigo, 2005)
- Marvel Monsters: Monsters on the Prowl: "Good Monsters!" (with Steve Niles, one-shot, Marvel, 2005)
- Intersections (with Sean Phillips, Image, 2007)
- Hellboy (with Mike Mignola, Dark Horse):
  - Darkness Calls #1–6 (2007)
  - "The Mole" (in Free Comic Book Day one-shot, 2008)
  - The Wild Hunt #1–8 (2008–2009)
  - The Storm #1–3 (2010)
  - The Fury #1–3 (2011)
  - "An Unmarked Grave" (with John Arcudi, in Dark Horse Presents No. 8, 2012)
- Nelson: "Wednesday, September 11, 2002" (script and art, anthology graphic novel, Blank State, 2011)
- Thought Bubble Anthology: "Not So Secret Origins..." (script and art, one-shot, Image, 2011)
- MPH #1-5 (with Mark Millar, Image, 2014–2015)

=== Cover work ===
- Crisis No. 21, 24 (Fleetway, 1989)
- Third World War No. 1 (Fleetway, 1990)
- Judge Dredd Megazine vol. 1 No. 3, 5 (Fleetway, 1990–1991)
- Dredd and Buried: Necropolis No. 9 (Fleetway, 1992)
- Doom Patrol No. 62 (DC Comics, 1992)
- The Extremist No. 2 (Vertigo, 1993)
- Shade, the Changing Man #42–50, 54–63, 65–70 (Vertigo, 1993–1996)
- Hellstorm: Prince of Lies No. 21 (Marvel, 1994)
- Aliens vs. Predator: War tpb (Dark Horse, 1996)
- Aliens: Stronghold tpb (Dark Horse, 1996)
- Batman: Shadow of the Bat #56–58 (DC Comics, 1996–1997)
- Star Wars: Splinter of the Mind's Eye tpb (Dark Horse, 1996)
- Dark Horse Presents No. 117, 123 (Dark Horse, 1997)
- Aliens: Havoc No. 2 (Dark Horse, 1997)
- Star Wars: Tales of the Jedi – The Fall of the Sith Empire #1–5 (Dark Horse, 1997)
- Star Wars: Tales of the Jedi – The Golden Age of the Sith tpb (Dark Horse, 1997)
- Star Wars: Shadows of the Empire – Evolution #1–5 (Dark Horse, 1998)
- 2000 AD #1088, 1090, 1093, 1095, 1097, 1142, 1144, 1147–1148, 1178, 1265, 1281, 1290, Prog 2004 (Fleetway/Rebellion Developments, 1998–2003)
- Predator vs. Judge Dredd tpb (Dark Horse, 1998)
- The Sandman Presents: Love Street #1–3 (Vertigo, 1999)
- Legends of the DC Universe No. 19 (DC Comics, 1999)
- Judge Dredd Megazine vol. 3 No. 56 (Fleetway, 1999)
- Star Wars: Union #1–4 (Dark Horse, 1999–2000)
- Clerks: The Lost Scene No. 1 (Oni Press, 1999)
- Lucifer #1–14 (Vertigo, 2000–2001)
- The Crusades No. 5, 12 (Vertigo, 2001–2002)
- Books of Magick: Life During Wartime No. 8, 12–15 (Vertigo, 2005)
- Toxin No. 4, 6 (Marvel, 2005)
- Freakshow No. 14 (Atomic Diner, 2006)
- Demon Hunter X No. 1 (White Wolf, 2007)
- Tripwire Annual '07 (Tripwire, 2007)
- Turf No. 1 (Image, 2010)
- Judge Dredd Megazine No. 315 (Rebellion, 2011)
- B.P.R.D.: Hell on Earth – The Long Death #1–3 (Dark Horse, 2012)
- B.P.R.D.: Hell on Earth – The Devil's Engine #1–3 (Dark Horse, 2012)
- Falling Skies: The Battle of Fitchburg No. 2 (Dark Horse, 2012)
