= British Invasion (comics) =

Influx of British comic creators into the American comic book industry (1980s)

The British Invasion of American comic books is a term used to describe the influx in the late 1980s of British comic creators, especially writers. The creators initially worked in the employ of DC Comics, but in recent years many have also worked for Marvel Comics.

Characteristics of the British Invasion included a greater sensitivity to language, more mature storylines, and a move away from the superhero genre. The invasion led DC Comics to create the Vertigo imprint to target the mature audiences of these writers.

== History ==
Prior to the start of the British Invasion, DC Comics had imported several British artists from the early 1980s to work on their comic books. Brian Bolland was at the vanguard of this influx. Others that followed included Dave Gibbons, Brendan McCarthy, Glenn Fabry, Steve Dillon, and Philip Bond.

The British Invasion itself is often cited as occurring in the wake of Alan Moore's successful run on Swamp Thing and his Watchmen series. After Moore had a falling-out with DC and swore never to work for them again, DC editor (later Vertigo Group Editor) Karen Berger recruited many promising writers and artists from the UK. The names primarily associated with the invasion include Jamie Delano, who was approached by DC as the writer of the Swamp Thing spin off Hellblazer; Neil Gaiman and Dave McKean, who collaborated on the Black Orchid limited series, as well as the famous and acclaimed Sandman; Peter Milligan, who launched a new Shade, the Changing Man series; and Scottish creator Grant Morrison, whose pitch of an Animal Man series was approved. Later British creators to work on American comics include Mark Millar, Warren Ellis, Garth Ennis and Paul Jenkins.

== Characteristics ==
While some "British" writers such as Chris Claremont (Claremont was born in England but spent all of his adult life in the United States) had already worked for American comic companies prior to Alan Moore, they are not associated with the British Invasion. One of the chief characteristics of the British Invasion group of writers that set them apart from others was their greater sensitivity to language. Before the British Invasions, writers in the American comic book industry were known as "ace storytellers but mediocre wordsmiths" because the "actual text" of their comic books were generally subordinate to the plot and storytelling. With his work on Swamp Thing, Alan Moore revolutionised the American comic book industry through his use of "precise, naturalistic dialogue." Another characteristic of the British Invasion was a move away from the superhero genre, although in this regard Grant Morrison was an exception.

== Collections ==
- Marvel Masters: The British Invasion:
  - Volume 1 (by Neil Gaiman, Alan Davis, Mark Millar, Garth Ennis, Grant Morrison, Alan Grant, Paul Jenkins and Warren Ellis, 276 pages, Panini Comics, September 2007, ISBN 1-905239-63-7)
  - Volume 2 (by Dave Gibbons, Frank Quitely, Alan Davis, Bryan Hitch, Steve Dillon, John Bolton, Barry Windsor-Smith, Mark Buckingham, Paul Neary and Lee Elias, 276 pages, Panini Comics, September 2008, ISBN 1-905239-96-3)
