= Kid Amazo =

- The Frank Halloran incarnation of Kid Amazo as depicted in JLA Classified #39 (August 2007). Art by Carlos D'Anda.

Publication information
- Publisher: DC Comics
- First appearance: JLA Classified #37 (June 2007)
- Created by: Peter Milligan

In-story information
- Alter ego: Frank Halloran
- Abilities: Possesses all of the abilities of the core Justice League members: Wonder Woman, Superman, Martian Manhunter, Batman, Flash, and Green Lantern.

Kid Amazo is the name of two characters appearing in media published by DC Comics. Both are related to Amazo, with the first being a cyborg and the second being a human who wields Amazo armor.

== Fictional character biography ==
=== Android ===
Kid Amazo is an android created by Professor Ivo, who is pursuing vengeance against the Justice League of America. Believing that the original Amazo failed due to being entirely mechanical, Ivo makes Kid Amazo a cyborg, combining material from Amazo's body with human DNA.

Ivo sends Kid Amazo away to live with other humans and complete his instruction and programming. Kid Amazo is given the secret identity of Frank Halloran, a 21-year-old college student, student of existentialism and follower of the Übermensch concept. Frank forms a close relationship with Sara Shapiro, who, unbeknownst to him, is his "mother" (the donor of the human ova needed for his creation) and Ivo's daughter. As Frank is ignorant of his true past, he merely sees Sara as a confidant and believes he cannot pursue a relationship with her because her parents would disapprove of Frank's atheism.

Upon witnessing a battle between Amazo and the Justice League, Frank is forced to reconsider his assumptions when Amazo saves Sara's life. He becomes increasingly fascinated by superheroes and their ideals, where Sara responds only with cold detachment. Frank, still shaken up, is later confronted by Amazo itself. Amazo reveals to Frank the truth about his nature, and Frank convinces himself to join Amazo, whereupon he assumes the alias "Kid Amazo".

Eventually, Kid Amazo has a change of heart and decides to become a superhero, leaving Professor Ivo to wonder which will be stronger — Frank's human upbringing or his mechanical origins. However, all of Frank's attempts to be a hero backfire. Martian Manhunter performs a psychological evaluation on Frank and judges the boy to be on the brink of insanity. The Justice League decides to closely monitor Frank's further attempts to better himself by exploring both sides of his heritage. He fights minor villainy as "The Kid", but winds up the target of Amazo, the League, and Sara herself. This, added to his inability to cope with his isolation and loneliness, leads him to explore his villainous side, which again brings him to the attention of the Justice League. His life in shambles and his sanity shattered by the revelations about his past, Kid Amazo embraces his full power. Able to mimic both powers and minds, he truly becomes a one-man Justice League. However, his power becomes his downfall, as Batman and the rest of the Leaguers decide to voluntarily bicker and quarrel among themselves, destabilizing both their team and Kid Amazo's mind. The stress of a single mind mimicking a shattered team is enough to make Kid Amazo explode.

=== Rebirth ===
A new Kid-Amazo, Reggie Meyer, appears in the DC Rebirth series Super-Sons, and was created by Peter Tomasi and Jorge Jimenez.

Reggie Meyer is part of a family who gained superpowers from the Amazo virus and protect their hometown of Providence, Rhode Island as a team. Reggie is more inclined to being a bully than he ever was a good Samaritan, and his particular household is prone to infighting even before they obtained superpowers. An android created by Lex Luthor manipulates Reggie into obtaining Amazo armor, which enhances his powers and enables him to become a supervillain.

== Powers and abilities ==
The first Kid Amazo can mimic the abilities and minds of the Justice League's core members. This gives him superhuman strength, speed, invulnerability, flight, infrared vision, heat vision, x-ray vision, and a healing factor.

The Rebirth incarnation of Kid Amazo can duplicate himself, gaining increased strength the more clones he creates. His Amazo armor enables him to create clones of others using nanomachines.
