= Pilgrim (film) =

2000 film directed by Harley Cokeliss

- DVD cover
- Directed by: Harley Cokeliss
- Screenplay by: Peter Milligan
- Story by: Harley Cokeliss; Peter Milligan
- Produced by: Harley Cokeliss; Michael Cowan; Gary Howsam; Jason Piette
- Starring: Ray Liotta; Gloria Reuben; Armin Mueller-Stahl
- Cinematography: Stephen McNutt
- Edited by: Michael Bradsell
- Music by: Fred Mollin
- Release date: March 31, 2000 (United States TV premiere)
- Running time: 96 minutes
- Country: Canada
- Language: English

Pilgrim (sometimes later titled as Inferno) is a 2000 film directed by Harley Cokeliss and written by Peter Milligan. It stars Ray Liotta as an amnesiac.

== Plot ==
Jack (Ray Liotta) awakes with amnesia in the middle of the desert. Suffering from violent flashbacks, he finds his way to the home of reclusive artist Vicky Robinson (Gloria Reuben), who agrees to help him uncover his past. While Jack's flashbacks become more violent and vivid, the pieces of his past slowly come together. He remembers having a large sum of money, which is now missing. As his apparent associates catch up with him demanding to know the whereabouts of the stash, Jack realizes that they are not only after the money, but his life.
