= Bill Jaaska =

American comics artist

- Born: June 22, 1961
- Died: November 9, 2009 (aged 48)
- Areas: Writer, Penciller, Inker
- Notable works: The New Titans; Sable

William C. Jaaska (June 22, 1961 – November 9, 2009) was an American comics artist.

== Career ==
Bill Jaaska's first published comics work was a Skywolf story in Airboy #11 (Dec. 1986). He worked with Peter David on The Incredible Hulk. David has commented that Jaaska's art on The Incredible Hulk #380 was crucial to the impact of the story.

Jaaska is best known for his work on The New Titans published by DC Comics. After leaving The New Titans with issue #113 (August 1994), Jaaska's final new work in the comics industry appeared in Turok, Dinosaur Hunter #23 (May 1995) published by Acclaim Comics.

In 2005, Anthem Pictures used Jaaska's Terminator artwork to create The Terminator: Hunters and Killers a unique "Digital Comic DVD". The product uses art from the original comic books combined with actors reading the dialog, to create a flowing story that does not have actual motion in the traditional sense of animation, but is not static, in that the screen moves across the panels, and focuses on elements considered important by the director. The result is a comic that can be watched on a video screen as opposed to being read.

Bill Jaaska died November 9, 2009 in Milwaukee, Wisconsin.

== Bibliography ==
=== Acclaim Comics ===
- Turok #23 (1995)

=== Dark Horse Comics ===
- The Terminator: Hunters and Killers #1–3 (1992)

=== DC Comics ===
- Checkmate #26 (1990)
- The New Titans #100–103, 108–110, 113 (1993–1994)
- Shade, the Changing Man #10 (1991)
- Swamp Thing #104, 110, Annual #6 (1991)
- Who's Who in the DC Universe #15 (1992)

=== Eclipse Comics ===
- Airboy #11 (1986)
- Scout #20 (1987)

=== First Comics ===
- Jon Sable, Freelance #56 (1988)
- Nexus #31 (1987)
- Sable #1–4, 6–7, 9–10, 13–17, 19 (1988–1989)

=== Marvel Comics ===
- The Incredible Hulk vol. 2 #378, 380 (1991)
- Marvel Super-Heroes vol. 2 #4 (1990)
- Nick Fury, Agent of S.H.I.E.L.D. #15 (1990)
- Uncanny X-Men #263, 265 (1990)
- Wolverine #30 (1990)

Preceded by Tony Salmons	Jon Sable, Freelance / Sable artist 1988-1989	Succeeded by Dave Hoover
Preceded by Tom Grummett	The New Titans artist 1993-1994	Succeeded by Rick Mays
