= Human Target (Vertigo) =

Comic series written by Peter Milligan

- Cover of Human Target #1 (April 1999), art by Tim Bradstreet.

Publication information
- Publisher: Vertigo
- Schedule: Monthly
- Format: Mini-series; Graphic novel Ongoing series
- Genre: Spy
- Publication date: Mini-series April 1999 – July 1999; Final Cut May 2002; Ongoing October 2003 – June 2005
- No. of issues: Mini-series 4 Final Cut 1 Ongoing 21

Creative team
- Written by: Peter Milligan
- Artist(s): Mini-series Edvin Biuković; Final Cut Javier Pulido; Ongoing Javier Pulido & Cliff Chiang
- Letterer(s): Mini-series Robert Solanovic; Final Cut Todd Klein; Ongoing Clem Robins
- Colorist(s): Mini-series Lee Loughridge; Final Cut Dave Stewart; Ongoing Lee Loughridge
- Editor(s): Mini-series Alex Alonso; Final Cut Karen Berger & Steve Bunche; Ongoing Karen Berger & Zachary Rau

Collected editions
- Human Target: ISBN 1-56389-693-1
- Final Cut: ISBN 1-56389-904-3

Human Target is an espionage-related comic series written by Peter Milligan and published by the Vertigo imprint of DC Comics. The series was based on the Human Target character created in 1972 by Len Wein and Carmine Infantino. The original Vertigo miniseries yielded an original graphic novel and later, an ongoing series.

== Publication history ==
=== Mini-series ===
Christopher Chance, alias the Human Target, was a back-up feature created for Superman's title Action Comics comics in the 1970s. In 1999, writer Peter Milligan and artist Edvin Biuković revived the character for the Vertigo imprint with a four-issue limited series. Human Target #1–4 saw Chance assaulted by an assassin, the end product of which was the loss of his face. While dealing with painful and lengthy reconstructive surgery, Chance uses his assistant, Tom McFadden, to impersonate him and draw out the assassin while protecting a Los Angeles reverend, which leaves all involved tormented both physically and mentally.

=== Final Cut ===
With the success of the limited series, Milligan returned to Christopher Chance in 2003 with the publication of an original graphic novel, Human Target: Final Cut, for which Milligan was joined by artist Javier Pulido. Chance, still reeling mentally from the aftermath of the previous limited series, works with a Hollywood family to save their missing celebrity son. Ultimately Chance fails in his mission, but adopts the guise of the boy's father, going so far as to have permanent reconstructive surgery to take on this, his final role. By doing so, Chance finds something he's never had before, a quiet life with a woman who loves him.

=== 2003-2005 series ===
Chance returned in an ongoing series later in 2003, also published under the Vertigo imprint. The series was again written by Peter Milligan, and illustrated by Javier Pulido and Cliff Chiang.

With his deceptions following Final Cut discovered, Chance leaves behind Los Angeles to move to New York City, taking on a variety of jobs that test him physically and mentally, as he explores the psychological cost of becoming someone else. The series, which lasted 21 issues, closed with the three-part arc, "The Stealer", which features the return of Tom McFadden, who has decided to take on the identiy of Christopher Chance.

== Collected editions ==
Several trade paperbacks of the series were released:

- Milligan, Peter; Biukovic, Edvin (2000). Human Target. p. 100. ISBN 1-56389-693-1. (collects the 1999 miniseries)
- Milligan, Peter; Pulido, Javier; Klein, Todd; Wein, Len; Stewart, Dave; Infantino, Carmine (2002). Final Cut. p. 96. ISBN 1-56389-904-3. (the original graphic novel)
- Milligan, Peter; Pulido, Javier (2004). Strike Zones. p. 128. ISBN 1-4012-0209-8. (collects ongoing series #1–5)
- Milligan, Peter; Chiang, Cliff (2004). Living in Amerika. p. 128. ISBN 1-4012-0419-8. (collects ongoing series #6–10)
- Milligan, Peter; Biukovic, Edvin (2010). Chance Meetings. p. 200. ISBN 978-1-84856-637-8. (collects the miniseries and graphic novel)
- Milligan, Peter (2011). Second Chances. p. 256. ISBN 978-1-4012-3061-6. (collects ongoing series #1–10)
