= X-Statix =

Fictional comic book group

Group publication information
- Publisher: Marvel Comics
- First appearance: X-Force #116 (July 2001)
- Created by: Peter Milligan (writer); Mike Allred (artist)

In-story information
- Type of organization: Team
- Agent(s): Anarchist; Bloke; Coach; Dead Girl; Doop; Spike Freeman; El Guapo; Henrietta Hunter; Mysterious Fan Boy; Lacuna; Orphan/Mr. Sensitive; Phat; Saint Anna; Spike; U-Go Girl; Venus Dee Milo; Vivisector

Roster
- See: List of members

X-Statix

Series publication information
- Schedule: Monthly
- Format: Ongoing series
- Genre: Superhero
- Publication date: September 2002 – October 2004
- Number of issues: 26
- Creator(s): Peter Milligan (writer); Mike Allred (artist)

Collected editions
- X-Force: Famous, Mutant & Mortal: ISBN 0-7851-1023-2
- Good Omens: ISBN 0-7851-1059-3
- Good Guys & Bad Guys: ISBN 0-7851-1139-5
- Back From the Dead: ISBN 0-7851-1140-9
- X-Statix vs. The Avengers: ISBN 0-7851-1537-4
- X-Statix Presents: Dead Girl: ISBN 0-7851-2031-9

X-Statix are a team of mutant superheroes appearing in American comic books published by Marvel Comics. The team was specifically designed to be media superstars. The team, created by Peter Milligan and Mike Allred, first appears in X-Force #116 and originally assumed the moniker X-Force, taking the name of the more traditional superhero team, who appear in #117 (June 2001) claiming to be "the real X-Force".

== Publication history ==
In 2001, the X-Men family of titles were being revamped by the newly appointed Marvel Comics editor-in-chief Joe Quesada. The aim was to make the titles more critically and commercially successful. Former Vertigo editor Axel Alonso hired writer Peter Milligan, best known for his surreal, post-modernist comics such as Rogan Gosh and Shade, the Changing Man, and Madman artist Mike Allred, as the new creative team for X-Force, starting with issue #116. Prior to Milligan and Allred's first issue, X-Force sold well, but had not been the critical success Quesada wanted.

Milligan and Allred completely revamped the series, designing a team more akin to popstars or reality TV contestants than the gritty, violent paramilitary group originally portrayed in the series. The title was laced with Milligan's satirical take on the superhero team as well as general cynicism toward the entire genre. Milligan wrote that he saw the characters' super powers as "vehicles for exploring our celebrity and fame-obsessed society."

"My mutants all have agents, negotiate fees for image rights, open megastores and live the dream. People die in my comic. We even have a character called Dead Girl."

Milligan and Allred would regularly play with killing off the title characters: In their first issue, they wiped out the entire team, with only two exceptions. This dramatic revision of the series was not universally accepted. Many readers wanted "their" X-Force back, a complaint Milligan later parodied in the pages of the title. Alonso described the series as "a hostile takeover of the X-Men paradigm." However, the title was receiving mainstream media coverage in titles like Rolling Stone.

X-Force #116 was the first Marvel Comics title since The Amazing Spider-Man #96–98 in 1971 to not have the Comics Code Authority (CCA) approval seal, due to the violence depicted in the issue. The CCA, which governed the content of American comic books, rejected the issue, requiring that changes be made. Instead, Marvel simply stopped submitting comics to the CCA.

X-Force was canceled with issue #129 in 2002 and renamed X-Statix; it restarted with a new issue #1. X-Statix carried on the same themes as X-Force, but with an increasingly satirical tone. Milligan planned to deploy Princess Diana as a character in a story-arc beginning in X-Statix #13: she was slated to return from the dead as a mutant superhero. However, when news of this leaked out to the media, a series of objections followed, most notably from the British tabloid newspaper The Daily Mail. A spokesperson for the British royal family called the planned story "appalling." Milligan responded to the controversy, writing in the British daily newspaper The Guardian that Diana fit in well with X-Statix as someone "famous for being famous" and that he would like to write a story where David Beckham joined the team, if he could convince Marvel to let him. On July 10, 2003, Marvel announced that they would remove Diana from the story, replacing her with fictional pop star Henrietta Hunter.

Although sales of the title during this time were moderate, they soon began to decline drastically. After a story-arc that pitted X-Statix against the Avengers, low sales prompted the title's cancellation with issue #26, published in 2004. In the last issue, Milligan and Allred killed off the entire team, delivering a final parody of the superhero genre while resolving the remaining plot threads.

In 2006, Marvel Comics published the five-issue miniseries X-Statix Presents: Dead Girl, which featured Dead Girl teaming up with Doctor Strange to combat a group of villains who have returned from the dead. The series is written by Milligan, with covers by Allred. The storyline (which features the returns of the Anarchist, the Orphan, and U-Go Girl) parodies the manner in which creators in the industry handle death in comic books, with popular characters often brought back from the dead.

In 2019, the Giant-Size X-Statix one-shot was published and written by Peter Milligan and Mike Allred, the original creators of X-Statix. The title showcased a new version of the team consisting of the new U Go-Girl (Katie Sawyer), Doop, Vivisector, Mister Sensitive, The A, and Phatty, as well as a new team, the X-Cellent. The X-Cellent consisted of Zeitgeist, Hurt John, Mirror Girl, and Uno, and former members of X-Force like Plazm, the Anarchist, La Nuit, Battering Ram, and Gin Genie. In 2020, The X-Cellent was announced as a successor to X-Statix. It received two 5-issue volumes, running from April to September 2022, and May to September 2023.

== Members ==
X-Statix is a team of colorfully dressed and emotionally immature young mutants. They are assembled and marketed as superstars, first by the mysterious Coach, and later by media mogul Spike Freeman.

=== Team ===
Cover of X-Force #116, by Mike Allred.

- Anarchist / Tike Alicar, the team's self-proclaimed "token" Black Canadian, whose acidic sweat enables him to fire energy bolts.
- Bloke / Mickey Tork, a mutant with the ability to change the color of his skin, like a chameleon.
- Dead Girl / Moonbeam, a mixture of ghost and zombie. Her civilian name has never been fully revealed, but she admitted after some cajoling that her first name is/was "Moonbeam". Dead Girl's mutant ability allows her to return to semi-life after dying; she is also able to become intangible and communicate with other dead people.
- Doop, a green, floating spheroid creature of unknown origin, who speaks in a "language" all his own (represented in text by a special font), and serves as the team's cameraman.
- Katie Sawyer / U-Go Girl / Gone Gal, daughter of U-Go Girl and has the power of teleportation.
- El Guapo / Roberto "Robbie" Rodriguez, a sexy male mutant with a sentient flying skateboard.
- Henrietta Hunter, a female pop star who is inexplicably reanimated with enhanced physical abilities and empathy This character was originally written as Diana, Princess of Wales, but Marvel decided to rewrite her when news of this plan caused controversy.
- Mysterious Fan Boy / Arnie Lundberg, the self-proclaimed greatest fan of X-Statix. He is placed on the team so that his reality-warping powers and unstable personality can be monitored and controlled.
- Orphan / Mister Sensitive / Guy Smith, the team's de facto leader, and a mutant with purple skin and antennae. He possesses heightened senses, superhuman speed, and the ability to levitate, and must wear a special suit to protect his highly irritated skin.
- Phat / William Robert Reilly, a gay white man who can harden, soften, and increase the size of any part of his body by expanding his subcutaneous fat layer.
- Saint Anna, an Irish-Argentinian mutant with the ability to levitate and control the motion of objects as well as physically and mentally heal others.
- The Spike / Darian Elliot, an African American character who is capable of extending thin spikes from his body or launching them as projectiles.
- U-Go Girl / Edith Sawyer, a blue-skinned, redheaded, narcoleptic teleporter who was once romantically linked to Zeitgeist and then to Orphan.
- Venus Dee Milo / De Milo, whose body was made entirely of crackling red energy that allowed her to teleport, project concussive blasts of energy, and heal minor wounds.
- Vivisector / Myles Alfred, a bookish, gay scholar who can transform himself into a wolf-like creature with enhanced senses, speed, agility, and powerful fangs and claws.

=== Mentors ===
- Coach, the manipulative mentor of the team while it was still operating as X-Force. He has only one arm and red eyes, hence nickname "The Arm". Coach has the second X-Force team eradicated in order to start a new one.
- Spike Freeman, an amoral, 34 year old thrill-seeking billionaire/trillionaire, he assists the team by auditioning new members, and by managing its public relations.

=== Allies ===
- Lacuna / Woodstock Schumaker, a young girl named Woodstock who seeks to join the team, she has the power of time manipulation.
- Professor X, the mentor of the X-Men who assists X-Statix on some occasions. He constructs special suits to accommodate Orphan and Venus Dee Milo's mutations.
- Wolverine, an old friend of Doop's who helps Orphan take down Coach and his back-up team.
- O-Force, a mutant superhero team. Consisting of Overkill, Obituary, Ocean, Ocelot, Ooze and Orbit. Candidates include Ozone, Orchid, Optoman, Oink, Oracle and Orifice. Ocelot, Orbit, and Orifice would later join the Upstarts.

=== X-Force ===
In Milligan and Allred's first issue of X-Force, nearly the entire team is killed off in an incident called the Boyz R Us Massacre. This precursory team, of which only U-Go Girl, Doop, and Anarchist survive, also included:

- Battering Ram, who has superhuman strength and durability as well as a thick skull which sported two ram-like horns and purple skin.
- Gin Genie / Beckah Parker, who can direct seismic energy from her body if she had consumed alcohol.
- La Nuit, a Frenchman who can generate a cloak of dark energy around him that disperses light and controls objects.
- Plazm, a living, lighter-than-air, liquid man who can control metabolic functions upon contact with another or through a spray from his hands.
- Sluk / Byron Spencer, who has a face composed of tentacles.
- Zeitgeist / Axel Cluney, the team leader, who can vomit acidic ooze from his mouth. He conspires with Coach to have his teammates killed, but is caught in the crossfire and killed as well. He previously had a one-night stand with U-Go Girl.

=== X-Cellent ===
- Rosa Lemper, East German mutant made of concrete.
- Jenny Spiegel / The Mirror Girl, a blue-skinned mutant.
- Whoosh / Billy McMullen, teleporter but killed by Zeitgeist.
- Fluff, capable of creating clouds of chest hair. Killed by Zeitgeist.
- Hurt John, able to read people's worst fears.
- Uno, giant eyeball capable of blasts.
- Toodle Pip / Artemis Boleyn, a blogger/teleporter, was forced by Zeitgeist to join after killing Whoosh.
- Joe Bomb, an explosion-creating mutant, died by his own power.

== Collected editions ==
X-Statix's appearances have been collected into the following trade paperbacks:

- X-Force: Famous, Mutant & Mortal (hardcover, 288 pages, July 2003, ISBN 0-7851-1023-2) collects:
  - Volume 1: New Beginnings (collects X-Force #116–120, 128 pages, November 2001, ISBN 0-7851-0819-X)
  - Volume 2: Final Chapter (collects X-Force #121–129, 224 pages, November 2002, ISBN 0-7851-1088-7)
- X-Statix:
  - Volume 1: Good Omens (collects X-Statix #1–5, Marvel, 2002, ISBN 0-7851-1059-3)
  - Volume 2: Good Guys & Bad Guys (collects X-Statix #6–10, Wolverine/Doop #1–2 and X-Men Unlimited #41, Marvel, 2003, ISBN 0-7851-1139-5)
  - Volume 3: Back From the Dead (collects X-Statix #11–18, Marvel, 2004, ISBN 0-7851-1140-9)
  - Volume 4: X-Statix vs. The Avengers (collects X-Statix #19–26, Marvel, 2004, ISBN 0-7851-1537-4)
- X-Statix Presents: Dead Girl (collects 5-issue limited series, Marvel, 2006, ISBN 0-7851-2031-9)

The entire run of X-Statix is collected in a hardcover Marvel Omnibus, which collects: X-Force #116–129; Brotherhood #9; X-Statix #1–26; Dead Girl #1–5; Wolverine/Doop #1–2; and material from X-Men Unlimited #41; I ♥ Marvel: My Mutant Heart and Nation X #4. (Marvel, 2011, ISBN 0-7851-5844-8)

== Reception ==
Despite receiving condemnation from the British royal family, X-Statix received critical acclaim, if not high popularity among readers. In naming X-Statix as one of "5 Marvel Properties That, Even After ‘Guardians of the Galaxy,’ Are Still Too Weird for the Big Screen", IndieWire wrote that X-Statix "viciously deconstructed every phony bit of comic-book artifice", put "fame-whoring media culture on trial", and confronted issues of race, class, and sexuality. IGN wrote that the frequency with which characters were killed off "lent the book an air of danger and unpredictability rare to mainstream superhero titles." In 2012, Entertainment Weekly included X-Statix in a list of "15 Comic Books We Want to See as Movies", saying that the work "has never looked more timely." Previously, in 2003, the magazine had given the series an A rating, calling it a "razor-sharp media critique with hyperbolic dialogue." Fumettologica praised the subtlety of the metatextuality in its satire, mentioning the character Anarchist's fear that people won't support adding a second African American to the team.

== Other versions ==
- Many members appear as baby versions as members of the Adorable X-Babies.
- Dead Girl, Doop, Orphan, U-Go Girl (Edith Sawyer), and Vivisector all appear as members of Generation X in X-Men '92.

== In other media ==
- Phat appears in X-Men: The Last Stand, portrayed by Via Saleaumua in his "large mode" and Richard Yee in his "small mode". This version is a member of the Omegas, who join the Brotherhood of Mutants in opposing a mutant cure, only to be killed by Iceman. Additionally, Phat is naturally large and has the ability to shrink in size.
- Zeitgeist appears in Deadpool 2, portrayed by Bill Skarsgård. This version is a member of X-Force who is killed on his first mission after crosswinds blow him into a woodchipper.
