= The Programme =

- The Programme #1 (Dec 2007), art by C. P. Smith

Publication information
- Publisher: Wildstorm
- Schedule: Monthly
- Format: Limited series
- Publication date: September 2007 -
- No. of issues: 12

Creative team
- Created by: Peter Milligan
- Written by: Peter Milligan
- Artist: C. P. Smith

Collected editions
- Volume 1: ISBN 1-4012-1815-6
- Volume 2: ISBN 1401219985

The Programme is a twelve-issue comic book limited series published by American label Wildstorm. All issues are written by Peter Milligan and drawn by C. P. Smith.

== Plot ==
The comic builds upon the idea that during the Cold War the superpowers Russia and USA built super-powered beings that should be used in case of a war. The story takes place in modern times when these beings wake up.

== Collected editions ==
There are two trade paperbacks that contain collected issues.

#	Title	ISBN	Release date	Collected material	Cover Artist	#Pages
1	Programme Vol. 1	ISBN 1-4012-1815-6	11 Jun 2008	issues 1-6	C. P. Smith	144
2	Programme Vol. 2	ISBN 1-4012-1998-5	23 Dec 2008	issues 7-12	C. P. Smith	144
