= Girl (Vertigo) =

1996 comic book limited series

- Cover of the first issue.

Publication information
- Publisher: Vertigo Vérite (DC Comics)
- Schedule: Monthly
- Format: Limited series
- Publication date: July – September 1996
- No. of issues: 3

Creative team
- Created by: Peter Milligan; Duncan Fegredo
- Written by: Peter Milligan
- Artist: Duncan Fegredo
- Letterer: Ellie De Ville
- Colorist: Nathan Eyring
- Editor: Shelly Roeberg

Girl is a three-issue comic book limited series written by Peter Milligan and drawn by Duncan Fegredo. It was published in 1996 by Vertigo comics, an imprint of DC Comics. The series was collected as a trade paperback under the DC Black Label imprint after more than 24 years since its initial publication (ISBN 9781779508195).

== Plot synopsis ==
The story follows the exploits of fifteen-year-old Simone Cundy, a resident of Bollockstown (a fictional English location), as she attempts to make sense of her uncontrollable apathy and discontent for life (early on, she cites girls, boys, the lottery, pop-stars, clothes, sport, tampons, television, Bollockstown and living among her chief dislikes). Upon meeting Polly, the "blonde version" of herself, Simone struggles to maintain the line between reality and her imagination, all the while trying find some purpose in her rotten life.
