= Greek Street (comics) =

American comic book series

Publication information
- Publisher: Vertigo
- Schedule: Monthly
- Format: Ongoing series
- Genre: Contemporary fantasy
- Publication date: September 2009 – October 2010
- No. of issues: 16
- Main character: Eddie

Creative team
- Created by: Peter Milligan; Davide Gianfelice
- Written by: Peter Milligan
- Artist: Davide Gianfelice
- Letterer: Clem Robins
- Colorist: Patricia Mulvihill
- Editor(s): Will Dennis; Mark Doyle

Collected editions
- Blood Calls for Blood: ISBN 1-4012-2573-X
- Cassandra Complex: ISBN 1-4012-2847-X

Greek Street is an American comic book series written by Peter Milligan with art by Davide Gianfelice. It retells and updates Greek myths. The series was canceled with issue #16.

== Plot synopsis ==
Ancient Greek stories are retold in modern Greek Street, London setting. The story starts with the main Hero Eddie navigating the increasingly treacherous landscape. The Fureys have also made their presence known as Eddie becomes entangled in plots being investigated by the detective Dedalus.

== Main characters and allusions to ancient Greek stories ==
- Eddie is Oedipus.
- The Three Mad Women are representative of Dionysus followers.
- Strippers act as the chorus.
  - Chantel is the primary stripper that gives an often ironic prologue at the beginning of each issue.
- The House of Furey is the Furies.
- Sandy is prophetess Cassandra.
- Lord Menon is King Agamemnon.
- Lady Esther is Queen Clytemnestra.
- Detective Dedalus is craftsman of the Labyrinth, Daedalus.
- Alex Jackson is Telamonian Ajax.

== Collected editions ==
The entire series has been collected into three trade paperbacks:

- Volume 1: Blood Calls for Blood (collects Greek Street #1–5, 144 pages, Titan Books, May 2010, ISBN 1-84856-549-6, DC Comics, March 2010, ISBN 1-4012-2573-X)
- Volume 2: Cassandra Complex (collects Greek Street #6–11, 144 pages, DC Comics, November 2010, ISBN 1-4012-2847-X)
- Volume 3: Medea's Luck (collects Greek Street #12–16, 128 pages, Titan Books, September 2011)
