= Shade, the Changing Man (Vertigo) =

American superhero comic book

- Cover of Shade, the Changing Man #1 (July 1990) by Brendan McCarthy.

Publication information
- Publisher: DC Comics (Vertigo)
- Schedule: Monthly
- Genre: Superhero, horror
- Publication date: July 1990 – April 1996
- No. of issues: 70
- Main character: Shade, the Changing Man

Creative team
- Written by: Peter Milligan

Shade, the Changing Man is an American superhero comic book featuring the character of the same name. The series was written by Peter Milligan and published by DC Comics; it lasted for 70 issues, from July 1990 to April 1996. The final 37 issues were published under the company's Vertigo imprint for mature readers. Shade, the Changing Man chronicles the adventures of Rac Shade, an alien from the planet Meta who becomes stuck in the body of Troy Grenzer, a convicted serial killer. The series' long-term story arc focuses on the relationship between Shade and Kathy George, a girl whose parents were killed by Grenzer.

The series explores the themes of identity and love triangles, while offering a critique of American culture. Milligan conceived Shade, the Changing Man after writing Skreemer, his first comic for DC. Editor Karen Berger asked Milligan to start working on a new series; Milligan chose to write about Shade, who had been created for a short-lived series by Steve Ditko in 1977. Milligan sought to differentiate his series from Ditko's: he only used elements of Shade he deemed necessary and took the character in a different direction. Numerous artists contributed to the series throughout its run; the most recurring was Chris Bachalo, who illustrated 38 issues.

Shade, the Changing Man has been called one of the most innovative comics ever published and one of Milligan's finest works. Reviewers found its take on the superhero genre bizarre and unconventional, and offered lavish praise for its originality and characters. Milligan considers it the series he is best known for, and has returned to write new stories about Shade on several occasions. The series was adapted as part of Cartoon Network's DC Nation Shorts in 2013. A spiritual successor, Shade, the Changing Girl, began in 2016, published under DC's Young Animal imprint.

== Synopsis ==
Rac Shade, an alien poet from the planet Meta, is recruited by Changemaster Wisor to become a Changing Man. Shade is deceived into traveling to Earth, causing his body on Meta to rot. As humans die when taken over by a Changing Man, Shade possesses Troy Grenzer, a serial killer about to be executed. Shade befriends Kathy George, whose parents were murdered by Grenzer, and Lenny Shapiro. He also must avoid law enforcement, who believe he is still Grenzer. Shade's first mission on Earth is to fight the American Scream—actually Agent Rohug, another Metan Changing Man who went insane after undergoing deep-culture-tank training focusing on American culture and stop the madness of Meta from flowing into Earth. Shade also battles with Grenzer, as a portion of his conscience survived and repeatedly tries to retake his body. Shade also develops an alter-ego, Hades, who causes Shade to give in to his own desires.

After the first storyline, the series shifted its focus to telling the love story about Shade and Kathy. Shade is killed, but his spirit is transferred to the body of a recently murdered red-headed woman. After further strange adventures, Shade is killed again, but angels force him to return to Earth and do their bidding. They provide him with a human host created for just such an occasion. The strain of death and the afterlife cause Shade's mind to become both unhinged and combined with that of Hades. Thus, Shade has no permanent hold on sanity and will bounce from impulsive mania to thoughtful collection quickly. He reunites with Lenny and Kathy, opens the Hotel Shade, and meets John Constantine. Kathy and Shade also have a child.

Kathy is eventually killed. Shade becomes a red-head again, but this time with a short mod cut. Lost in mourning, he removes himself from his old life and moves to the city, where he befriends a deaf dancer and the alleged reincarnation of Nikola Tesla. He also attempts to bond with his son only to find that the child is suffering from a fast-aging disease. Tired of suffering, Shade removes his heart and locks it in a metal box, becoming more apathetic to surrounding characters and events. Shade eventually loses control of the Madness, which begins feeding on his subconscious and maiming and killing innocents. Desperate to put things right, Shade gathers his remaining colleagues and develops a time machine. The resulting struggles are met with limited success; Shade's son, for instance, finds himself trapped in a female body, but Shade is reunited with Kathy.

== Themes and analysis ==
Shade, the Changing Man has been noted for its commentary on American culture. The second issue (August 1990), for example, is devoted to discussing the assassination of John F. Kennedy and the trauma it caused. Also, the American Scream represents everything bad about American culture infecting the entire world. Themes featured in the comic included racial tensions, gun violence, homelessness, and capital punishment. Other common themes were identity—with the series exploring what it means to be human and facing the consequences of others' actions and the love triangle between Shade, Kathy, and Lenny.

== Composition and development ==
=== Background ===
Rac Shade was created by Steve Ditko in 1977 for his series Shade, the Changing Man, published by DC Comics. In the series, Shade was depicted as resident of the planet Meta who is falsely accused of treason and uses the power of his "M-Vest" to protect himself with a force field and project the illusion of becoming a large grotesque version of himself. The series only lasted for eight issues, as it was one of DC's books that fell victim to the company's sudden 1978 cancellation of over two dozen comics. By 1990, Shade was a regular character in John Ostrander's Suicide Squad (1987–1992). Comics historian Matthew K. Manning, however, regarded the character as obscure and unknown to most readers.

During the late 1980s, DC editor Karen Berger began to recruit writers from the United Kingdom, such as Neil Gaiman, Grant Morrison, and Peter Milligan; Berger "found their sensibility and point of view to be refreshingly different, edgier and smarter". Gaiman began with Black Orchid, while Morrison wrote Animal Man and Doom Patrol. Then known for his stories in 2000 A.D. (1977–present), Milligan's first work for DC was a post-apocalyptic gangster series called Skreemer.

=== Production ===
After completing Skreemer, Milligan went on a brief hiatus from writing and began traveling across the United States. Berger asked Milligan to start writing a new series. Milligan chose to write a series about Shade, who he was fascinated by: "I thought, 'My God, to take on this character'... I liked the idea of changing. I liked the idea of madness. I liked the idea of madness almost like a force for change. ... I heard someone say a really good thing about schizophrenics... that, ah, for most people, schizophrenia is a break down, every now and again it's a breakthrough. The idea that madness can be a breakthrough". Milligan also thought the character was "nebulous enough for me to really put my stamp on".

Though a self-proclaimed fan of Ditko's work, Milligan sought to distance his Shade from the character in the original series. Milligan retained elements he believed were necessary to the character (his "wacky" backstory and powers emphasizing madness) but took some of the character's qualities in a different direction. This allowed Milligan enough creative freedom to put his mark on Shade. Milligan views his Shade as a homage to Ditko's work rather than a direct continuation. As Shade, the Changing Man progressed, Milligan felt as if its narrative was becoming dry. He praised assistant editor Shelly Roeburg for telling him how innovative she thought it was. Milligan described the series as a whole as "a weird road movie with a girl and an alien".

One of Milligan's desires for Shade, the Changing Man was to offer a critique of the United States, particularly at a personal level. Milligan felt as if England had become "culturally dwarfed" by the US, and thought that the series offered him the opportunity to portray how he viewed the United States and its culture. Milligan said he typically came up with stories between one and two months before writing them. He preferred to "know where the story's going", but also liked "to be surprised by the characters". Milligan would typically notify his editors of what he planned for the series some time before publication, for advertising. One common request among fans was for Milligan to write a crossover with Shade meeting other DC characters, such as the Doom Patrol or the Sandman. Milligan joked that he wrote the storyline involving John Constantine when he realized the requests had died down. During its initial run, the series was established as taking place within the DC Universe (DCU), the shared, fictional universe that most of DC's publications take place in. The 2005 book Crisis on Infinite Earths: The Compendium declared the series non-canon to the DCU, having taken place in the same world as Elseworlds comics such as Batman: League of Batmen and Shazam: The New Beginning.

Multiple artists contributed to the series throughout its run. The most recurring was Chris Bachalo, who illustrated a total of 38 issues. (Note: These were issues #1 to #9, #11 to #13, #15 to #21, #23 to #26, #33 to #39, #42 to #45, #47, and #49 to #50.) Other regular artists were Glyn Dillon, Colleen Doran, Philip Bond, Mark Buckingham, Sean Phillips, Michael Lark, Richard Case, and Jamie Tolagson. Bill Jaaska, Bryan Talbot, Jan Duursema, Brendan McCarthy, Duncan Eagleson, Peter Gross, Scot Eaton, Steve Yeowell, and Andy Pritchett each made the art for single issues. Mark Pennington, Rick Bryant, Pablo Marcos, Dick Giordano, Rafael Kayanan, and Phil Gascoine inked the series, while Daniel Vozzo and David Hornung were colorists and Albert de Guzman, Richard Starkings, and Sean Konot were letterers.

== Release and reception ==
=== Publication history ===
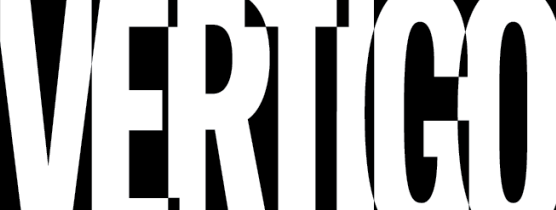
The final thirty-seven issues of Shade, the Changing Man were published under DC's Vertigo imprint.

The first issue of Shade, the Changing Man was published in July 1990. The series was part of DC's line of comics bearing an advisory "Suggested for Mature Readers" label on its cover, joining Hellblazer (1988–2013), Batman: The Killing Joke (1988), and The Sandman (1989–1996), among others. The series' first story arc was a lengthy, eighteen-issue tale called "The American Scream", detailing Shade's first adventures on Earth and his battle with the American Scream.

The series was initially published with the traditional "DC Bullet" logo. In 1993, Berger started a new imprint for DC, Vertigo, to focus on publishing comics aimed at mature readers. Issue #33 (March 1993) was the first issue of Shade, the Changing Man published under the Vertigo imprint. Milligan has reportedly said he wanted the series to end after issue #50 (August 1994), but it continued for another two years, ending with issue #70 (April 1996). The series was popular in the United States and, according to Milligan, it sold well.

=== Reviews ===
Shade, the Changing Man is remembered as one of Milligan's greatest works and one of the most innovative comics ever published. Many critics noted Shade, the Changing Man's bizarre, psychedelic, and unconventional take on superheroics. Hilary Goldstein (IGN) wrote that, out of all the strange comics DC published under Vertigo, Shade, the Changing Man was "the biggest headtrip of them all". Glen Weldon and Petra Mayer (NPR) took this notion further, believing the series' intent was to challenge the standard clichés of superhero comics. In an interview with MTV, Milligan said he thought the series is the one he is most known for.

Reviewers were quick to point out the series' emphasis on madness. Reviewing "The American Scream", Publishers Weekly said this mobilized Shade, the Changing Man's outlandish premise in a short time. Brian Salvatore (Multiversity Comics) was more exclamatory: "What starts off as a straight tale of a murder and punishment quickly turns into a metaphysical mind ... almost without warning". Goldstein compared the series to reading a fairy tale-like dream, and expressed disappointment the collection he read ended so quickly. The series' commentary on America was widely noted, and Burgas found the series offered much more than just being bizarre, from love triangles to identity.

The characterization of Shade and Kathy has been acclaimed. Goldstein thought Shade provided readers "the first step into the wonderful madness of [the series]". Brian Cronin (Comic Book Resources) called their pairing unusual (being a naïve poet and a depressed girl), and Publishers Weekly wrote the duo were well-crafted, empathetic, and said their pairing was perfect. Salvatore considered Kathy the series' true protagonist, calling her powerful considering the circumstances she faces. Burgas declared their relationship "one of the most magnificent love stories in comics".

Bachalo's art was generally praised, and his work on Shade, the Changing Man has been called his breakthrough. Goldstein found the art less refined than some of Bachalo's later work, which he thought had "a more appealing, unprocessed look to it". Salvatore called the art fluid and realistic, yet surreal. He said that, compared to future Bachalo art, Shade, the Changing Man clearly showed who influenced the illustrations (specifically Sam Kieth), giving it a rawness he found satisfactory. Publishers Weekly wrote the "expressionistic artwork and surreal tendencies perfectly complement Milligan's story". Burgas offered praise for Vozzo's digital coloring, feeling it enhanced the impact of Bachalo's art, but felt that almost none of the series' artists lived up to the standards set by Bachalo, the exception being McCarthy.

Burgas wrote that, after "The American Scream", Milligan turned his focus from storytelling to the romance between Shade and Kathy, differentiating it from the majority of Vertigo's comics. Burgas thought this caused the book to meander and thought this was frustrating. He said that issues released after Kathy's death, and Bachalo's departure from the series, marked a declining point. He, however, still thought "the final 20 issues are still part of a marvelous love story... While Milligan couldn't quite recapture the magic of the first 50 issues (and especially the first 26 issues), the entire series is a wonderful journey". Cronin thought the series should have ended with the 50th issue.

== Related works ==
In 2003, as part of the Vertigo imprint's tenth anniversary special, Milligan and Mike Allred produced "One Crazy Girl's Story", a new story featuring Shade. During the 2011 crossover event Flashpoint, Milligan produced a tie-in story, Flashpoint: Secret Seven, which featured his Shade as the star. According to Milligan, he wanted to write a story about Shade for Flashpoint so he could "explore a different kind of Shade... After all this time I still feel I'm finding out more about Shade". After Flashpoint concluded, DC's entire comics line was relaunched in an initiative called the New 52. Milligan began writing a new series, Justice League Dark, which featured Shade as one of the eponymous team's members. Shade left the team after the eighth issue (June 2012), after losing control of the M-Vest in Gotham City. In 2016, DC started a new imprint, Young Animal, to focus on comics set in the DCU and directed at mature readers. One of the imprint's launch series was a spiritual successor to Shade, the Changing Man called Shade, the Changing Girl, later retitled Shade, the Changing Woman. The series deals with Rac Shade's legacy, and he also has guest appearances.

== Collected editions ==
=== Shade, the Changing Man vol. 2 (1990–1996) ===
#	Title	Material collected	Pages	Publication Date	ISBN
Paperback
1	The American Scream	Shade, the Changing Man vol. 2 #1–6	168	March 1, 2003	1-84023-716-3
2	The Edge of Vision	Shade, the Changing Man vol. 2 #7-13	192	December 1, 2009	1-84856-501-1
3	Scream Time	Shade, the Changing Man vol. 2 #14-19	176	July 6, 2010	1-4012-2768-6
Omnibus
Shade, the Changing Man by Peter Milligan and Chris Bachalo Omnibus Vol. 1		Shade, the Changing Man vol. 2 #1-37	992	July 15, 2025	978-1799500308
Shade, the Changing Man by Peter Milligan and Chris Bachalo Omnibus Vol. 2		Shade, the Changing Man vol. 2 #38-70, Vertigo Jam vol. 1 #1, and Vertigo X Preview vol. 1 #1	1000	February 17, 2026	978-1799510529

== Other media ==
A two-minute adaptation of Shade, the Changing Man was produced for DC Nation Shorts, a series of animated shorts that aired on Cartoon Network. It was released on August 20, 2013.
