= Enigma (Vertigo) =

American comic book series

- Cover of the Enigma trade paperback

Publication information
- Publisher: Vertigo
- Schedule: Monthly
- Format: Limited series
- No. of issues: 8

Creative team
- Created by: Peter Milligan
- Written by: Peter Milligan
- Artist: Duncan Fegredo
- Letterer: John Costanza
- Colorist: Sherilyn Van Valkenburgh
- Editor: Art Young

Collected editions
- Enigma: ISBN 1-56389-192-1

Enigma is an American comic book series written by Peter Milligan, with art by Duncan Fegredo, featuring a superhero named "The Enigma". It was published as an eight-issue limited series as part of the launch of Vertigo, an imprint of DC Comics, in 1993.

== Publication history ==
Enigma was originally spearheaded by Vertigo editor Art Young. DC had recently acquired the characters from Charlton Comics, including Peter Cannon. Young was inspired by the description of Peter Cannon as the smartest man in the world. He reached out to Peter Milligan, who was working on comics like Shade the Changing Man with Vertigo, to create a pitch based on the character. Young, who is a gay man, wanted to introduce gay characters in Vertigo comics. When he was given the opportunity to lead the development of Enigma, he introduced the idea of making the character of Michael Smith gay. Young originally aimed to publish Enigma under his planned adult imprint with Disney Comics, Touchmark, but after Touchmark failed to materialize, he brought the pitch to Vertigo.

Young had worked with Duncan Fegredo on Kid Eternity and reached out to him to collaborate with Milligan on Enigma. Enigma was one of Fegredo's earliest projects and the first of several collaborations with Milligan. Fegredo would later work with Milligan on the Vertigo comics Face, Girl, and Shade the Changing Man.

== Plot ==
Michael Smith is a telephone repairman in his late 20s who lives with his girlfriend in Pacific City, California. His father was killed in an earthquake that buried his childhood home, and he was abandoned by his mother soon after. His rigidly organized life is disrupted when he sees a lizard that seems to be floating down the street. After following the lizard, he happens upon a deformed monster called the Head. The Head attacks Michael, but before it can kill him, Michael is saved by a mysterious superhero. He recognizes the superhero as the Enigma, a fictional character from a short-run comic series that he loved as a child.

Michael's revelation about the superhero inspires him to abandon his structured life and travel to Arizona, where he meets up with Titus Bird, the man who wrote The Enigma comic series. Michael convinces Titus to follow him to Pacific City, which is being terrorized by the sudden appearance of supervillains. All of the supervillains were transformed from ordinary and seemingly unconnected people, and all are targets of the Enigma. In hopes of finding answers, Michael and Titus track down a relative of Roger Cliff, the man who originally morphed into the Head. They discover that Roger once took a lizard from a murder site in Arizona where a woman shot her husband. After returning home, Michael encounters the supervillain Envelope Girl, who forcibly teleports him to the farm in Arizona where the murder occurred years ago. He speaks with a relative of the murder victim, who tells him that the farm was exorcised due to a series of strange occurrences, including floating lizards.

After making his way back to Pacific City again, Michael realizes that he recognizes the motifs of several of the supervillains from the decor of his childhood home. He travels to his buried home and finds the Enigma living in the ruins. Enigma explains that he was born on the farm in Arizona that Michael visited and that he has the power to manipulate anything in his surroundings with his mind. As a baby, he inadvertently used his powers to mutilate his father, causing his mother to kill her husband in panic and abandon her son in a well. The Enigma grew up in the well until the exorcists who arrived at the farm set him free. After hearing the Enigma's story, Michael confesses that he has recently been struggling with his sexuality and a newfound attraction to men. He ends up sleeping with the Enigma.

Michael and Enigma visit Titus at the hospital, where he has been confined after an accident. The three of them are attacked by a new monster, who Enigma admits is his mother. He confesses that after he left the well, he was unable to cope with the lack of rigid limitations governing his life. He happened upon Michael's childhood home and his buried belongings, including the old Enigma comics that Titus wrote. Driven by a desire for purpose in his life, he decided to transform himself into the superhero Enigma. While using his mental powers to warp ordinary people into the supervillains from the comics, the Enigma accidentally warped his mother as well, creating an entity determined to destroy him. In the hopes of becoming more human and thus receiving some mercy from his mother, he manipulated Michael into falling for him so that he could experience compassion and love. Though Michael is initially horrified by this revelation, he finally declares that he is happy as a gay man and affirms his love for Enigma. The story ends on an open note, with Michael, Titus, and the Enigma joining hands and waiting as Enigma's mother approaches.

== Reception ==
Steve Faragher reviewed the Enigma graphic novel for Arcane magazine, rating it a 6 out of 10 overall. Faragher comments that "this graphic novel features a deliberately bizarre mish-mash of styles and reminds me of avant-garde Italian literature that I was forced to read at university. It turns the genre on its head, attempts to explore the relationship between author and reader within the context of the story and challenges many of our preconceptions about the relationships we have with our heroes". A 2007 review by Comic Book Resources praised the series for the handling of its subject matter.

== Collected editions ==
The series was collected into a trade paperback. A new edition of Enigma was released in 2015. A deluxe hardcover version of the comic, titled Enigma: The Definitive Edition, was published under Dark Horse Comics' Berger Books imprint in 2021, including exclusive development art from Fegredo.
