= Hewligan's Haircut =

- Cover to the collected edition of Hewligan's Haircut. Art by Jamie Hewlett.

Publication information
- Publisher: Originally IPC Media (Fleetway) until 1999, thereafter Rebellion Developments
- First appearance: 2000 AD #700 (1991)
- Created by: Peter Milligan (writer); Jamie Hewlett (artist)

Hewligan’s Haircut is a comic series created by Peter Milligan and Jamie Hewlett that appeared in the British magazine 2000 AD in 1990. The title character’s name is a blend of Hewlett and Milligan, and a play on "hooligan".

The series is a surreal comedy. Hewligan, an inmate of an insane asylum, gives himself a haircut with a pair of plastic scissors only for an inexplicable hole to appear in his huge pompadour, causing an apocalyptic bending of reality. The plot takes the form of a madcap interdimensional quest for Hewligan and his reality-warping companion Scarlet O’Gasmeter to set things straight.

Writing about Hewligan’s Haircut for Time, Douglas Wolk remarks that as with “Milligan’s other comics, the idea of madness is a license to pour anything and everything onto the page”. Wolk cites MAD comics as a major antecedent of Hewlett’s artwork, which incorporates a self-conscious mishmash of techniques and reference points, including fanzines, collage, Dada, cubism and pop art.

== Collected editions ==
- Classic 2000 AD #11, 1996
- Hewligan's Haircut: A Story in Eight Partings (2000 AD Books, 1991, ISBN 1853862460)
- Hewligan's Haircut (Rebellion, 2003, ISBN 1904265065)
