= Egypt (comics) =

Comic book by Peter Milligan

Publication information
- Publisher: Vertigo
- Format: Miniseries
- Publication date: August 1995 – February 1996
- No. of issues: 7

Creative team
- Written by: Peter Milligan
- Artist(s): Glyn Dillon

Egypt is an American comic book miniseries written by Peter Milligan, with artwork by Glyn Dillon, featuring a time-hopping English slacker named Vin Me. It was published as a seven-issue limited series by Vertigo, an imprint of DC Comics, in 1995. Later issues also featured art by Robert Corona and Phil Gascoine.

== Plot ==
After meeting a strange cult, Victor is sacrificed and transported back in time to ancient Egypt. He experiences multiple lives through reincarnation before the end of the series. At one point, he also returns to the present to get revenge on the cult members who originally killed him.

== Artistic team ==
Peter Milligan and Glyn Dillon: Issue #1

Peter Milligan, Robert Corona, and Phil Gascoine: Issues #2-7

== Collections ==
The series was collected as Egypt (tpb, 192 pages, 2016, ISBN 1-4012-6136-1).
