= Skin (graphic novel) =

Graphic novel by Peter Milligan and Brendan McCarthy

- Date: 1992
- Publisher: Dave Elliott, Tundra UK

Creative team
- Writers: Peter Milligan
- Artists: Brendan McCarthy
- Colorists: Carol Swain
- ISBN: 1858090008

Skin is a 48-page graphic novel written by Peter Milligan, created and drawn by Brendan McCarthy and colored by Carol Swain. It tells the story of a young skinhead, Martin Atchitson, who grew up in 1970s London with thalidomide-related birth defects. Milligan has said the story partially addresses "universal themes of major companies shafting people, and corruption in terms of drugs and mass marketing."

== Publication history ==
Skin was planned to be published in the 2000 AD spin-off magazine Crisis in 1989, but the story's controversial subject matter and explicit language made the publisher, Fleetway, uncomfortable. Printers refused to print it, citing similar reasons. The story remained in limbo until it was published as a graphic novel by Dave Elliott as part of Kevin Eastman's Tundra Publishing line-up for Tundra UK in 1992 with little controversy. Dark Horse Comics reprinted Skin in 2013, as part of the trade-paperback collection The Best of Milligan and McCarthy.

== Reception ==
Tom Palmer, Jr. included Skin in "Palmer's Picks", calling it "a powerful, disturbing book".

=== Awards ===
- 1993: nominated for the "Best Graphic Album: New" Eisner Award
