= Skreemer =

Publication information
- Publisher: DC Comics
- Schedule: Monthly
- Format: Limited series
- Genre: Post-apocalyptic
- Publication date: May – October 1989
- No. of issues: 6

Creative team
- Created by: Peter Milligan; Brett Ewins; Steve Dillon
- Written by: Peter Milligan
- Penciller: Brett Ewins
- Inker: Steve Dillon
- Letterer: Tom Frame
- Colorist: Tom Ziuko
- Editor: Karen Berger

Collected editions
- Skreemer: ISBN 1-56389-925-6

Skreemer is a six-issue comic book limited series, written by Peter Milligan with art by Brett Ewins and Steve Dillon. The first issue was published by American company DC Comics in May 1989.

== Synopsis ==
The story is set in New York, thirty-eight years after the fall of civilisation. The central character is Veto Skreemer, an imposing giant in an age when giants are near-obsolete. His story is narrated by Peter Finnegan as he looks back on both Veto's life and how it intersects with the lives of the Finnegan family, contrasting the formers' rise to power with the latter's struggle to survive.

== Inspiration ==
Brett Ewins, in the foreword to the book, explains that Skreemer has two distinct inspirations. The first is gangster films, specifically Once Upon a Time in America and The Long Good Friday, and the second is James Joyce's Finnegans Wake.

== Collected editions ==
The series has been collected into a trade paperback:

- Skreemer (169 pages, 2002, Titan Books, ISBN 1-84023-485-7, DC Comics, ISBN 1-56389-925-6)

== Awards ==
- 1989: Won "Favourite Single or Continued Story US" Eagle Award
- 1990: Won "Best Limited Series" Speakeasy Awards
