= The Extremist (comics) =

1993 comic book miniseries by Peter Milligan and Ted McKeever

- Cover to The Extremist #1 (September 1993), art by Ted McKeever.

Publication information
- Publisher: Vertigo
- Format: Miniseries
- Publication date: September – December 1993
- No. of issues: 4

Creative team
- Created by: Brendan McCarthy
- Written by: Peter Milligan
- Artist: Ted McKeever

The Extremist is a four-issue comic book miniseries, written by Peter Milligan with art by Ted McKeever. The series was published by DC Comics through their Vertigo comics imprint from September to December 1993. It was originally created by Brendan McCarthy, who gave it to Peter Milligan to develop as a comic series because he "couldn't be bothered to draw it".

== Plot ==
Judy Tanner, grieving after the murder of her husband Jack, desires to get revenge on the murderer. She submerges her identity into that of "The Extremist", an alias her husband went by in both his life as a patron of the most extreme sex clubs and as a hired assassin for a shadowy organization called "The Order". Judy eventually murders a woman she believes to be her husband's killer, but she later learns the real killer was a man named Patrick, the "Chief Hedonist" of the Order. Patrick claims he killed Jack in order to manipulate Judy into becoming the Extremist, and into killing an innocent woman, to "liberate" her from her bourgeois moral system.

After Judy goes missing, her neighbor Tony Murphy attempts to find her while discovering more and more about what "The Extremist" really is, and he is both ashamed and titillated by his discoveries. In his quest to find Judy, Tony's obsession prompts his wife and newborn child to leave him. He does eventually manage to track Judy down, after which a thoroughly indoctrinated Judy kills him to prevent him from exposing her activities or those of the order.
