= Peter Milligan =

British writer (born 1961)

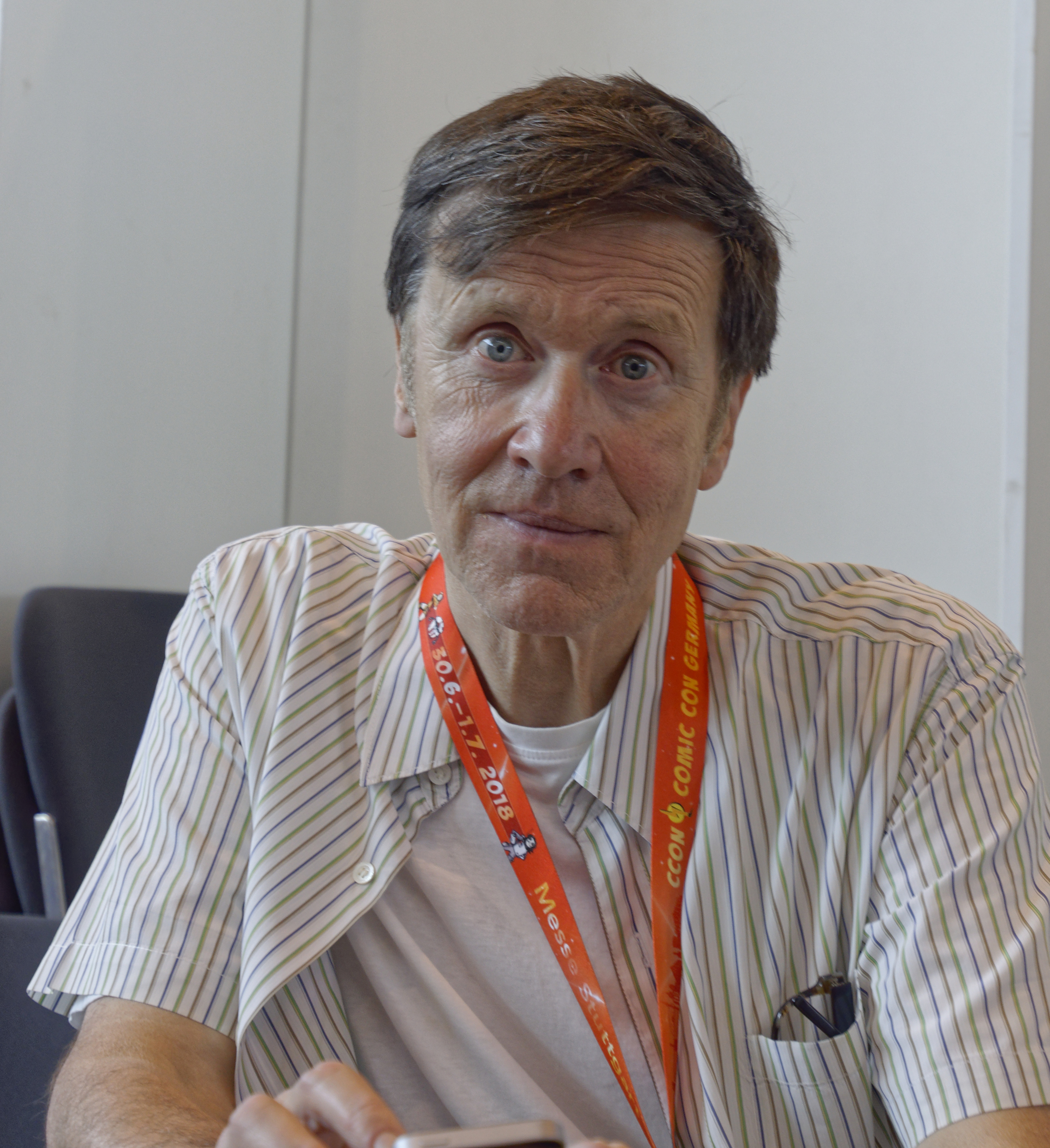
- Born: 24 June 1961 (age 65) London, England
- Area: Writer
- Notable works: Bad Company; Shade, the Changing Man; Enigma; Human Target; X-Force / X-Statix; Hellblazer
- Awards: UK Comic Art Award for Best Writer, 1991, 1994

Peter Milligan (born 24 June 1961) is a British comic book writer who has written extensively for both British and American comic book industries. In the UK, Milligan has contributed to numerous anthology titles including 2000 AD, Revolver, Eagle and A1, and helped launch the magazine Deadline. In the US, he is best known for his frequent contributions to DC Comics' Vertigo imprint, which include the revamped DC properties Shade, the Changing Man and Human Target, a four-year run on the imprint's premier title Hellblazer, and original series Enigma, The Extremist, Egypt and Greek Street, as well as the Marvel series X-Statix, co-created by Milligan and artist Mike Allred.

== Career ==
Milligan started his comic career with Sounds music paper's comic strip The Electric Hoax, with Brendan McCarthy, with whom he went to art school. Milligan later moved to write short stories for 2000 AD in the early 1980s. By 1986, Milligan had his first ongoing strip in 2000AD called "Bad Company", with artists Brett Ewins and Jim McCarthy. "Bad Company" was a popular future war story and helped Milligan become better known.

Concurrently, Milligan, Ewins and Brendan McCarthy had been working on the anthology title, Strange Days for Eclipse Comics. Strange Days featured three strips, "Paradax", "Freakwave", and "Johnny Nemo". Milligan, McCarthy and Ewins produced three issues of this psychedelic comic, it was not a great seller but it picked up a small, loyal readership. The most conventional strip, "Johnny Nemo", had its own series, while the more quirky "Paradax" had a two-issue series published by Vortex Comics in 1987.

By 1989, Milligan was swapping between strips such as "Bad Company", while still writing material in 2000AD, such as "Hewligan's Haircut" with artist Jamie Hewlett. Milligan and artist Jim McCarthy created the Steve Ditko-inspired "Bix Barton". This was first run as a black and white strip for its first outing, "Barton's Beasts"; the second strip was called "Carry On Barton" (originally "Carry On Snuffing"). The strip was very popular and was a precursor of "Devlin Waugh" and others.

In 1989, he had his first work published by DC Comics. Skreemer was a six-issue mini-series (May 1989 – October 1989) drawn by Brett Ewins that was somewhat lost in the midst of the so-called "British Invasion" of American comics of the time. A dark post-apocalyptic gangster story, the series received critical acclaim, but did not sell well. Milligan was soon to become a regular writer for DC while still working on his more personal comics in the United Kingdom in comics such as 2000 AD, and its spin-off titles Crisis and Revolver.

The 1990s saw Milligan revamp Steve Ditko's character Shade, the Changing Man for DC Comics. This proved his most successful American comic, and came at the end of the first wave of the "British Invasion". With issue No. 33 (March 1993), it became part of the Vertigo imprint. It was cancelled with issue No. 70 (April 1996). A one-off story marking Vertigo's tenth anniversary was published in 2003.

Milligan succeeded Grant Morrison on Animal Man for a six-issue run in 1990–1991, and became the regular writer of Batman in Detective Comics in the same year. During an editorial meeting, Milligan presented the idea that led to the creation of Azrael, who became Batman during the "Knightfall" crossover.

Skin (art by Brendan McCarthy) was the story of a young thalidomide skinhead in 1970s London, and his attempts to deal with his disability and the world in general. The strip was due to feature in Crisis in 1990 but the publishers Fleetway were worried by the controversial subject matter, plus they were concerned with the use of explicit language in the story. The printers refused to print it, blaming the graphic language and controversial subject matter as a reason. The story remained in limbo until eventually being published as a graphic novel by Tundra Press to little controversy.

Milligan and artist Duncan Fegredo created Enigma for Disney Comics' planned Touchmark imprint. When the Touchmark line was cancelled, the project moved to DC's newly launched Vertigo line in 1993. Milligan quickly followed this up with The Extremist with artist Ted McKeever. Both titles dealt with taboo subjects for a mainstream publisher, but were applauded for their handling of these subjects.

Milligan and artist Mike Deodato launched the Elektra series for Marvel Comics in November 1996. Milligan spent the remainder of the decade writing one-off specials such as Face and The Eaters, or miniseries like Egypt and Tank Girl The Odyssey (with its co-creator Jamie Hewlett providing art), as well as acting as advisory editor to Paul Honeyford's Fighting Figurines. Milligan and Brendan McCarthy's psychedelic comic Rogan Gosh was reprinted in a collected edition by Vertigo in 1996, after being first serialised six years earlier in Revolver.

Milligan rounded out the decade by writing a The Human Target four-issue miniseries (April 1999 – July 1999).

Milligan's film work includes the screenplay for Pilgrim (2000, also known as Inferno), starring Ray Liotta. He scripted the 2002 adaptation of the Melvin Burgess novel An Angel for May.

In 2001, Marvel Comics' new editor-in-chief Joe Quesada began revamping the X-Men family of titles. Milligan and artist Mike Allred took over X-Force with issue No. 116 (July 2001), and immediately replaced the book's Rob Liefeld-styled team with a more satirical one: the Orphan, the Anarchist, U-Go Girl, Phat, Vivisector, Venus Dee Milo, Dead Girl and Doop. X-Force was cancelled with issue No. 129 (August 2002), and replaced by a new title, X-Statix, with Milligan and Allred continuing as the creative force. Milligan proposed a character based on a resurrected Princess Diana. News spread to the British tabloid newspaper The Daily Mail, which strongly objected. Eventually the character was altered, as were the references to the British royal family. X-Statix was cancelled with issue No. 26 (Oct. 2004).

Milligan wrote issues #166–187 of X-Men, teamed with artist Salvador Larroca, in 2005. He returned to The Human Target with the graphic novel Final Cut, followed by all 21 issues of the subsequent series for Vertigo. In 2006, he wrote the X-Statix Presents: Dead Girl five-issue miniseries for Marvel collaborating with artist Nick Dragotta and co-creator Mike Allred. The following year he wrote an Infinity, Inc. limited series for DC and The Programme for Wildstorm, starring a Soviet Cold War superhero. Milligan was involved in 2007's Batman crossover, "The Resurrection of Ra's al Ghul", by writing the lead-in Batman Annual No. 26, as well as the parts of the storyline in the Robin monthly title.

Milligan scripted for the BBC interactive animated series Meta4orce and the Sub-Mariner: The Depths limited series for Marvel's Marvel Knights imprint.

In late 2008, Milligan was named writer for the long-running Vertigo series Hellblazer, and wrote that imprint's Greek Street, Additionally, for Marvel, he wrote the 2008 one-shot Moon Knight: Silent Knight, with artist Laurence Campbell.

In 2010, Milligan was announced as the writer for Batman #703, a prelude to the "Bruce Wayne: The Road Home" crossover storyline, although he later clarified that he was not involved in the production of the issue.

Following DC's 2011 relaunch, Milligan became the writer of Red Lanterns, an ongoing series which debuted in September 2011. He wrote Justice League Dark, a spin-off of the Justice League franchise, starring John Constantine and Shade, the Changing Man. up to issue No. 8 (June 2012), following which he moved to Stormwatch from issue No. 9 (July 2012). In 2017 and 2018, he penned the revivals of two classic British properties for Titan Comics, Dan Dare and The Prisoner.

== Awards ==
- 1991 UK Comic Art Award for Best Writer
- 1993 (nomination) UK Comic Art Award for Best Writer
- 1993 (nomination) UK Comic Art Award for Best Original Graphic Novel (Skin)
- 1994 UK Comic Art Award for Best Writer

== Filmography ==
- Pilgrim (also known as Inferno, 2000)
- An Angel for May (2002)
- Meta4force (2008)

Preceded by Marv Wolfman	Batman writer 1990	Succeeded by Alan Grant
Preceded by Marv Wolfman	Detective Comics writer 1991–1992	Succeeded by Chuck Dixon
Preceded by Grant Morrison	Animal Man writer 1990–1991	Succeeded by Tom Veitch
Preceded by n/a	Elektra writer 1996–1997	Succeeded by Larry Hama
Preceded by Ian Edginton	X-Force writer 2001–2002	Succeeded by Fabian Nicieza
Preceded by Chuck Austen	X-Men writer 2005–2006	Succeeded by Mike Carey
Preceded by Andy Diggle	Hellblazer writer 2009–2013	Succeeded by Jeff Lemire; Ray Fawkes (Constantine)
Preceded by n/a	Justice League Dark writer 2011–2012	Succeeded by Jeff Lemire
Preceded by n/a	Red Lanterns writer 2011–2013	Succeeded by Charles Soule
Preceded by Paul Jenkins	Stormwatch writer 2012–2013	Succeeded by Jim Starlin
Preceded by Justin Jordan	Shadowman writer 2013–2014	Succeeded by Andy Diggle
Preceded by Greg Pak (Eternal Warrior vol. 2)	Eternal Warrior writer 2014–2015	Succeeded by Robert Venditti (Wrath of the Eternal Warrior)
