= Shade, the Changing Man =

Fictional comic book character created by Steve Ditko for DC Comics in 1977

- The original Shade version by Steve Ditko

Publication information
- Publisher: DC Comics
- First appearance: Shade the Changing Man #1 (June 1977)
- Created by: Steve Ditko

In-story information
- Alter ego: Rac Shade
- Team affiliations: Suicide Squad; Justice League Dark; Justice League Multiverse; Justice League
- Notable aliases: Mad Mod Poet God
- Abilities: The M-Vest creates a strong forcefield that repels weaponry, allows a degree of flight and distorts Shade's appearance dependent on the viewer's mental state or his own.

Shade, the Changing Man is a character created by Steve Ditko for American comic books published by DC Comics in 1977. The character was later adapted by Peter Milligan and Chris Bachalo in one of the first Vertigo titles.

Both versions of Shade are distinct from the Shade, an unrelated DC Comics character.

== Publishing history ==
Shade, the Changing Man told the story of a fugitive from the militant planet Meta in another dimension. Shade (whose full name is Rac Shade) was powered by a stolen "M-vest" (or Miraco-Vest, named for its inventor) which protected him with a force field and enabled him to project the illusion of becoming a large grotesque version of himself.

The character was the first Ditko had created, or helped to create, for a mainstream publisher for many years. Prior to rejoining DC Comics, Ditko had worked on characters such as his Mr. A. title. Shade was a return to mainstream superheroics, although Shade indicated no connection with the DC Universe. Michael Fleisher scripted the series based on Ditko's plotting and art.

His series ran for eight bi-monthly issues in 1978 before its sudden cancellation in the wake of the "DC Implosion", a contraction of DC's line that saw a third of their books axed right before the September releases. A ninth extra-length issue, featuring the debut of a new Ditko character called the Odd Man, was produced, but was published only as a part of DC's Cancelled Comic Cavalcade in 1978. A revised version of the Odd Man story appeared in Detective Comics #487 (Dec. 1979-Jan. 1980). Both stories were published in The Steve Ditko Omnibus Vol. 1 (2011), a hardcover collection of Ditko's DC work.

After this, Shade was adopted into the DC Universe and made a brief appearance in the Crisis on Infinite Earths miniseries as well as becoming a regular character in Suicide Squad.

== Fictional character biography ==
=== Original series ===
Cover of Shade, the Changing Man #6 (original series) by Steve Ditko.

Rac Shade is a secret agent from the Meta-Zone dimension who is framed for treason and sentenced to death. Through various events, Shade spends time on Earth trying to clear his name, but is met with resistance from the Meta-authorities at each point. Shade's former fiancée Mellu Loron seeks revenge against him for causing an explosion that crippled her parents. Her mother, operating a mechanical monster called the Supreme Decider (or Sude) had other plans.

The Metans have an outpost on Earth called the Occult Research Center (O.R.C). The center was run by Wizor, assisted by Leno. Mellu ran it for a time. The O.R.C. operates by telling the absolute truth about Meta, something the public tends to laugh off. When Mellu desires to kill Shade, the fact that other, more violent, criminals released in the freak accident during the prison riot that freed Shade become priority, annoys her greatly and causes her to leave the organization.

When Dr. Sagan shows Mellu videotape evidence that Shade has rescued her from a deadly part of the Zero-Zone called the Area of Madness, she changes her mind about Shade, in spite of having been the one who had ultimately captured him.

In the final issue, President Olon's hands are tied in regard to the treason charge. Even though he considers Shade innocent, until his death sentence is overturned in court, he is still under a death sentence as Col. Kross gathers evidence in his defense. With all of these on his side, Shade leaps into the Zero-Zone and is swallowed by the Area of Madness.

=== Running with the Suicide Squad ===
Shade ends up living in the Area of Madness. The Suicide Squad, after leaving Nightshade's home dimension, ends up here and Shade is able to adjust his M-Vest so he can teleport himself and the Squad to Earth. There, he learns that the O.R.C. has been taken over by Doctor Z.Z. and a gang of Metan criminals. They hope to use the place as a base to conquer Earth and eventually Meta itself. Shade's plan to stop them is sidetracked by the Crisis On Infinite Earths and being stuck back in the Zero Zone. He is eventually rescued by the Squad.

Shade became increasingly doubtful of the wisdom of staying with the Squad. When Lashina offers to return him to his home dimension via a detour to Apokolips, Shade agrees, not knowing what is in store for him. He ends up being forced to kidnap Vixen as well as Captain Boomerang. Shade knows that his actions were wrong, but feels he had little choice.

Lashina betrayed him as soon as possible on Apokolips. Suicide Squad staff member Flo Crawley and member Doctor Light are killed in an ensuing battle with Apokoliptian forces. Darkseid appears and settles the conflict, sending the Squad and its dead home. Shade, wracked with guilt, is sent back to his home dimension.

== Peter Milligan and the Vertigo years ==
Shade, the Changing Man
- The third iteration of Milligan's Shade (center), with Kathy (left) and Lenny, taken from Shade the Changing Man #50; art by Brian Bolland.

Publication information
- Publisher: DC Comics, Vertigo
- First appearance: Shade the Changing Man #1 (July 1990)
- Created by: Peter Milligan and Chris Bachalo

In-story information
- Alter ego: Rac Shade
- Notable aliases: Troy Grenzer
- Abilities: Can use his Madness Vest to warp reality to his will

In July 1990, six months after Shade's final appearance in Suicide Squad, Shade was revamped by Peter Milligan and Chris Bachalo, becoming part of the so-called "British Invasion", alongside Neil Gaiman's Sandman and Grant Morrison's Animal Man.

The new series still took place in the DC Universe: John Constantine appeared in a three-issue story arc, Death of the Endless appeared in a subtle cameo in issue #50 and Shade appeared with a group of other Vertigo characters in 1999's one-shot Totems. The comic departed quickly from its origins. Milligan and Bachalo reinvented Rac Shade as a red-headed lovelorn poet sent to Earth to stop a growing tide of madness from consuming the planet, his M-Vest becoming a Madness-Vest capable of warping reality. Working from Brendan McCarthy's character designs, Bachalo created a distinctive look for the comic, distinguishing it from the character's other DC Universe appearances. The original series was retconned as a story that Shade made up to amuse himself while traveling to Earth, with his time with the Suicide Squad being left unexplained.

Milligan killed Shade off several times during the series, bringing him back each time in a different form: a woman; a black-haired madman; a red-haired, emotionless mod; and a bedraggled, unshaven obsessive.

The series employed concepts which were at times controversial and distinct from regular DC titles (for example, JFK's assassination and transgender issues). To distinguish these more 'adult' themes in Shade and other titles, DC created the Vertigo imprint in 1993. Shade became one of the initial Vertigo titles starting with issue #33.

Shade sold steadily for Vertigo and maintained a cult following. The title lasted 70 issues before being cancelled in 1996.

In 2003, a special one-off story by Peter Milligan and artist Mike Allred was printed as part of Vertigo's 10th anniversary celebration. In August 2010, Hellblazer #268 featured the return of Shade, the Changing Man, this time as a supporting cast member for John Constantine in a series of storylines written by Milligan.

According to the Absolute Crisis on Infinite Earths hardcover book, the events of the second series originally took place on Earth-85 in the DC Multiverse before its destruction.

== Return to the DCU ==
Shade, the Changing Man as seen in Flashpoint, art by Andy Kubert.

In 2011, Shade was featured in Geoff Johns' Flashpoint miniseries and its spin-off miniseries Flashpoint: Secret Seven (written by Peter Milligan). This version of Shade is visually based on the Vertigo incarnation, but draws elements from the original Steve Ditko iteration of the character as well. In the series, history is altered accidentally by the Flash, resulting in a greatly altered timeline. Here, Shade is the leader of a band of heroes dubbed the Secret Seven, which includes Enchantress and Amethyst, Princess of Gemworld. Shade and the others are recruited by Cyborg as part of an effort to stop the war between Atlantis and New Themyscira.

Following the relaunch The New 52, Shade appears as one of the lead characters in the first story arc of Justice League Dark, a new title written by Peter Milligan and drawn by Mikel Janin.

== DC's Young Animal ==
In October 2016, DC debuted a new imprint: Young Animal. One of the initial titles is Shade, The Changing Girl, which features a female Metan named Loma who admires the late Rac Shade and his poetry. She steals the Madness Vest from a museum and takes over the body of a comatose teenage girl called Megan Boyer on Earth. The creative team behind this new version includes writer Cecil Castellucci and artist Marley Zarcone. Beginning in March 2018, the series changed names like many Young Animal titles, becoming Shade, The Changing Woman. After the name change, the tone of the book changed to a more introspective one, as Loma left her small town and traveled through several locations, while the book also shifted its focus onto the secondary characters introduced on the previous run. Exploring themes of dissociation, depression, xenophobia, destiny and being an outcast, Loma eventually meets Rac Shade.

Both titles also featured Loma's successor River Johnson. He was a normal teenage outcast in the small suburban town that Loma Shade was transported to after stealing the M-Vest. River, finding out that Loma was an alien in disguise, became her friend and confidant.

== Other versions ==
- An alternate universe version of Shade appears in Kingdom Come.
- An alternate universe version of Shade appears in JLA: The Nail as a member of the Outsiders.

== Collected editions ==
The original Steve Ditko series is collected in The Steve Ditko Omnibus Vol. 1 (2011).

The Vertigo series was collected into trade paperbacks:

- Volume 1: The American Scream (168 pages, collects #1-6, 2003, Titan Books, ISBN 1-84023-716-3, DC Comics, ISBN 1-4012-0046-X, DC version resolicited 2009, reprint, Titan, December 2009, ISBN 1-84856-500-3)
- Volume 2: The Edge of Vision (192 pages, collects #7-13, DC Comics, November 2009, ISBN 1-4012-2539-X, Titan Books, January 2010, ISBN 1-84856-501-1)
- Volume 3: Scream Time (176 pages, collects #14-19, DC Comics, July 2010, ISBN 1-4012-2768-6)

The Young Animal series was collected into three trade paperbacks:

- Shade, the Changing Girl Volume 1: Earth Girl Made Easy (144 pages, collects #1-6, DC Comics, 2017, DC Comics, ISBN 9781401270995)
- Shade, the Changing Girl Volume 2: Little Runaway (168 pages, collects #7-12, DC Comics, 2018, ISBN 9781401275457)
- Shade, the Changing Woman (168 pages, collects #1-6, DC Comics, 2019, ISBN 9781401285708)

== In other media ==
- Shade appears in a self-titled episode of DC Nation Shorts, voiced by Benjamin Diskin.
- Shade makes a non-speaking appearance in Justice League: The Flashpoint Paradox.
- Shade appears as a character summon in Scribblenauts Unmasked: A DC Comics Adventure.
