= List of Hellblazer creators =

This article is a list of creators who have worked on the Vertigo comic book series Hellblazer.

== Writers ==
=== Main series ===
- 1–24: Jamie Delano
- 25–26: Grant Morrison
- 27: Neil Gaiman
- 28–31: Jamie Delano
- 32: Dick Foreman
- 33–40: Jamie Delano
- 41–50: Garth Ennis
- 51: John Smith
- 52–83: Garth Ennis
- 84: Jamie Delano
- 85–88: Eddie Campbell
- 89–128: Paul Jenkins
- 129–133: Garth Ennis
- 134–143: Warren Ellis
- 144–145: Darko Macan
- 146–174: Brian Azzarello
- 175–215: Mike Carey
- 216–228: Denise Mina
- 229: Mike Carey
- 230-244: Andy Diggle
- 245-246: Jason Aaron
- 247-249: Andy Diggle
- 250: Jamie Delano, Brian Azzarello, Dave Gibbons, China Miéville and Peter Milligan
- 251-300: Peter Milligan

=== Specials and spin-offs ===
- Mike Carey (All His Engines graphic novel)
- Jamie Delano (Bad Blood miniseries, Hellblazer Annual, The Horrorist mini-series and Pandemonium graphic novel)
- Andy Diggle (Lady Constantine mini-series)
- Garth Ennis (Heartland and Hellblazer Special one-shots)
- Peter Hogan (Love Street miniseries and Marquee Moon one-shot; both advertised as The Sandman spin-offs, but feature Constantine)
- Paul Jenkins and John Ney Rieber (Hellblazer/Books of Magic mini-series)
- Mat Johnson (Papa Midnite mini-series)
- John Ney Rieber (The Trenchcoat Brigade mini-series)
- Simon Oliver (Chas – The Knowledge mini-series)
- John Shirley (Hellblazer novels Subterrenian and Warlord)
- Si Spencer (Hellblazer: City of Demons miniseries)
- Ian Rankin (Dark Entries Vertigo Crime OGN starring John Constantine)

=== Short stories ===
- Brian Azzarello ("The Origin of Vice" in Vertigo Secret Files: Hellblazer & "All I Goat For Christmas" in #250 'Holiday special')
- Mike Carey ("Exposed" in 9/11 Volume 2)
- Jamie Delano ("Prodigal Son" in Vertigo Secret Files: Hellblazer & "Christmas Cards" in #250 'Holiday special')
- Garth Ennis ("Tainted Love" in Vertigo Jam and "All Those Little Girls and Boys" in Winter's Edge 2)
- Dave Gibbons ("Another Bloody Christmas" in Winter's Edge 3 & "Happy New Fucking Year" in #250 'Holiday special')
- Paul Jenkins ("Tell Me" in Winter's Edge 1)
- China Miéville ("Snow Had Fallen" in #250 'Holiday special')
- Peter Milligan ("The Curse of Christmas" in #250 'Holiday special' & "Letter From A Suicide" in House of Mystery Halloween Annual #1 and #2)

== Cover artists ==
=== Main series ===
- Dave McKean (1–21, 27, 40)
- Kent Williams (22–24, 28–39)
- David Lloyd (25–26)
- Tom Canty (41–50)
- Sean Phillips (51, 85–128)
- Glenn Fabry (52–83, 129–133, 144–145, 239–242)
- John Eder (84)
- Tim Bradstreet (134–143, 146–215)
- Greg Lauren (216–217, 219)
- Lee Bermejo (218, 221–238, 243-255)
- Leonardo Manco (220)
- Simon Bisley (256-300)

Note that Tim Bradstreet also supplied cover art for an unpublished version of issue 141. The story that would have appeared in this issue, "Shoot" by writer Warren Ellis and artist Phil Jimenez, was deemed unsuitable for publication after the Columbine shootings, as it focused on an FBI agent investigating school shootings. However, Shoot was eventually published in 2010 as Vertigo Resurrection #1.

Additionally, there were two covers commissioned for issue 218: the solicited one by Greg Lauren showing John Constantine being crucified, and the published one by Lee Bermejo showing Constantine lighting a cigarette in the wind. The reasons for the change of cover remain unknown.

Other Hellblazer covers have also been commissioned but not used, and are available for viewing here .

=== Specials and spin-offs ===
- Lee Bermejo (Dark Entries Vertigo Crime OGN starring John Constantine)
- Tim Bradstreet (Hellblazer novels Subterrenian and Warlord)
- Steve Dillon (Heartland)
- Glenn Fabry (Hellblazer Special and The Trenchcoat Brigade 1–4)
- David Lloyd (The Horrorist 1–2)
- Leonardo Manco (All His Engines OGN)
- Sean Murphy (Hellblazer: City of Demons 1-5)
- Phil Noto (Lady Constantine 1–4)
- Sean Phillips (Bad Blood 1–4 and Hellblazer/Books of Magic 1–2)
- Kent Williams (Hellblazer Annual)
- Ronald Wimberly (Papa Midnite 1–5)

== Main interior artists ==
=== Main series ===
- John Ridgway (1–9)
- Richard Piers Rayner (10–16)
- Mike Hoffman (13, 17, 48)
- Mark Buckingham (18–22)
- Ron Tiner (23–24, 28–30)
- David Lloyd (25–26, 56, 250)
- Dave McKean (27, 40)
- Sean Phillips (31, 34–36, 51, 84–100, 102–107, 109–120, 250)
- Steve Pugh (32–33, 37–39)
- Will Simpson (41–47, 50, 52–55, 59–61, 75)
- Steve Dillon (49, 57–58, 62–76, 78–83, 157, 175–176, 200)
- Peter Snejbjerg (77)
- Al Davison (101)
- Charles Adlard (108)
- Warren Pleece (121–128)
- John Higgins (129–139)
- Frank Teran (140)
- Tim Bradstreet (141)
- Javier Pulido (142)
- James Romberger (142)
- Marcelo Frusin (143, 151–156, 158–161, 164–167, 170–174, 177–180, 184–186, 189–193, 197–200)
- Gary Erskine (144–145)
- Richard Corben (146–150)
- Guy Davis (162–163)
- Giuseppe Camuncoli (168–169, 206, 243-244, 250, 251-253, 256-258, 261-264, 267 ongoing)
- Stefano Landini (250, 256-258, 261-264, 267 ongoing)
- Jock (181)
- Lee Bermejo (182–183)
- Doug Alexander Gregory (187–188)
- Leonardo Manco (194–195, 200–205, 207–212, 214–222, 224–228, 230-242, 247-249)
- Chris Brunner (196)
- Frazer Irving (213)
- Cristiano Cucina (223)
- John Paul Leon (229)
- Daniel Zezelj (238)
- Sean Murphy (245-246)
- Goran Sudžuka and Rodney Ramos (254-255)
- Simon Bisley (259-260, 265-266)

Note that Hellblazer #75 and #142 each contained two stories by two different artists. Issue 75 contained "Damnation's Flame part 4: Hail to the Chief" with art by Steve Dillon and "Act of Union" with art by William Simpson. Issue 142 contained "Setting Sun" with art by Javier Pulido and "One Last Love Song" illustrated by James Romberger.

Phil Jimenez supplied art for "Shoot", a Warren Ellis-penned tale focusing on high-school shootings that would have been the original issue 141. It was removed from the publishing schedule after the Columbine shootings occurred.

=== Specials and spin-offs ===
- Tony Akins (Papa Midnite 1–5)
- Philip Bond (Hellblazer Special: Bad Blood 1–4)
- Steve Dillon (Heartland and Hellblazer Special)
- Jock (Pandemonium OGN)
- Paul Lee (Hellblazer/Books of Magic 1–2)
- David Lloyd (The Horrorist 1–2)
- Leonardo Manco (All His Engines OGN)
- Dean Motter (Hellblazer Annual story: "Venus of the Hard Sell")
- Sean Murphy (Hellblazer: City of Demons 1-5)
- Goran Sudžuka (Lady Constantine 1–4)
- Bryan Talbot (Hellblazer Annual story: "The Bloody Saint")
- John Ridgway (The Trenchcoat Brigade 1–4)
- Werther Dell'Edera (Dark Entries Vertigo Crime OGN starring John Constantine)

=== Short stories ===
- Tim Bradstreet ("Prodigal Son" in Vertigo Secret Files: Hellblazer)
- Eddie Campbell ("The Curse of Christmas in #250 'Holiday special')
- Giuseppe Camuncoli laylouts & Stefano Landini finishes. ("Snow Had Fallen" in #250 'Holiday special' & "Letter From A Suicide" in House of Mystery Halloween Annual #1)
- Steve Dillon ("Tainted Love" in Vertigo Jam)
- Glyn Dillon ("All Those Little Girls and Boys" in Winter's Edge 2)
- Marcelo Frusin ("Exposed" in 9/11 Volume 2)
- Dave Gibbons ("Another Bloody Christmas" in Winter's Edge 3)
- Rafael Grampá ("All I Goat For Christmas" in #250 'Holiday special')
- Dave Lloyd ("Christmas Cards" in #250 'Holiday special')
- Sean Phillips ("Happy New Fucking Year" in #250 'Holiday special')
- Paul Pope ("Tell Me" in Winter's Edge 1)
- Dave Taylor ("The Origin of Vice" in Vertigo Secret Files: Hellblazer)
