= World Without End (comics) =

1990 limited series from DC Comics written by Jamie Delano

Publication information
- Publisher: DC Comics
- Schedule: Monthly
- Format: Limited series
- Genre: Science fiction
- Publication date: November 1990 – April 1991
- No. of issues: 6

Creative team
- Created by: Jamie Delano; John Higgins
- Written by: Jamie Delano
- Artist: John Higgins
- Letterer: Richard Starkings
- Colorist: John Higgins
- Editor(s): Karen Berger; Tom Peyer

Collected editions
- The Complete Collection: ISBN 0486808394

World Without End is a six-issue comic book limited series, created by Jamie Delano and illustrated by John Higgins, released by DC Comics in 1990.

== Publication history ==
Delano created the series between his run on Hellblazer and Animal Man.

Delano has said:

After four years of Hellblazer, we felt like an opportunity to cut lose into a world of outrageous language and sumptuous imagery… and no-one held us back. The scenario of the story is fantastical and allegorical rather than speculatively futuristic. I guess its themes are more broadly philosophical than some of the specific socio/political trends I have engaged with through the more near-future settings of works such as 2020 Visions, Hellblazer: Bad Blood and Narcopolis, etc.

== Plot summary ==
The story involves a battle of the sexes in the future.

== Reception ==
Black Gate magazine described the series as "everything comics have the potential to achieve…a psychic thought-bomb of words and pictures that blew my mind to bloody smithereens". They finished their review by saying that World Without End is:

A science fiction allegory mixed with fantasy adventure, told with style and skill that any comic creator has to envy. It's a glorious, mad excursion into a world of erotic dreams and brutal nightmares. Jamie Delano's power to evoke an entirely strange world ranks with that of sci-fi grandmaster Jack Vance. John Higgins' stunning paints, his storytelling ability, his dynamic use of color to create surreal moods and absurd realities, it's all the stuff of legend.

== Collected editions ==
Dover Books has collected the series into a single volume with an afterword by Stephen R. Bissette:

- World Without End: The Complete Collection (hardcover, 192 pages, October 2016, ISBN 978-0486808390)
