= Frank Cammuso =

American cartoonist (born 1965)

Frank Cammuso (born 1965) is an American writer, editorial cartoonist and graphic artist.

== Political cartoons ==
Based in Syracuse, NY, Cammuso graduated from Syracuse University (1987) and was for 23 years the political cartoonist for the city's newspaper, The Post-Standard. His cartoons have also appeared in the New York Times, the Washington Post, Slate, Newsweek, and Village Voice.

== Graphic novels and comics ==
Cammuso has created several graphic novel series for children, including Knights of the Lunch Table (Scholastic Books) and The Misadventures of Salem Hyde (Amulet Books). The graphic novel Max Hamm Fairy Tale Detective, which Cammuso wrote and illustrated, was described by one reviewer as "one of the cleverest parodies of private eyes I've ever read" and spawned several sequels. Cammuso has twice been nominated for the prestigious Eisner Award, for the first Max Hamm title (2005) and for Ottos' Backwards Day (2014).

In 2018, Cammuso partnered with Hart Seely, Tom Peyer, and Jamal Igle, to launch Ahoy Comics, whose lineup includes Captain Ginger (a spaceship crewed by cats) and Edgar Allen Poe's Snifter of Terror. In April 2019 Ahoy announced a new series, Second Coming, about "the satirical adventures of Jesus and his superhero roommate." The series, written by Mark Russell and drawn by Richard Pace, was originally set to be published by DC Vertigo but the company dropped it following online criticism from conservative groups and a petition on CitizenGo.

== Humor writing ==
Cammuso's humor writing has been featured by The New Yorker, NPR, the New York Times, and other national publications. His published collections of satire include 2007-Eleven: And Other American Comedies, co-written with Hart Seely.

== Teaching ==
Cammuso has taught at Syracuse University's College of Visual and Performing Arts.
