= Tainted (comics) =

Publication information
- Publisher: DC/Vertigo
- Format: Limited series
- Publication date: February 1995
- Main character(s): Mr. George Palmer, Lisa, Steve

Creative team
- Written by: Jamie Delano
- Artist(s): Al Davison

Tainted is an American comic book one-shot, created and written by Jamie Delano and illustrated by Al Davison. The comic debuted in February 1995, under the DC/Vertigo label, as part of the "Vertigo Voices" series of one-shots.

The work in itself was really more similar to the classic literature of the 18th and 19th centuries, and could be described as a darker version of a Kafkaesque short story.

== Voices ==
The Vertigo Voices sub-imprint was an early attempt by Vertigo to allow its creators freedom in producing creator-owned "distinctive one-shot stories", or as Julian Darius described them as "renegade short blasts, acts of artistic terrorism". Under a specially designed issue-header (along the top, rather than the normal Vertigo side-banner), the Vertigo Voices specials were owned by their creators.

Tainted was to have been the third release of the initial three titles (a fourth - Bizarre Boys – never saw print; The Eaters was not part of the initial line-up), but became the second (after Peter Milligan and Duncan Fegredo's Face) when Grant Morrison and Philip Bond's Kill Your Boyfriend was delayed.

== Plot summary ==
Set in a non-descript town in modern-day England, the reader meets Mr. George Palmer, a bland and upstanding citizen (if a little anal retentive), who carries with him a mysterious past, related to a missing finger. Palmer is revealed to have lost all three of his family members (mother, father and sister) at an early age, inheriting the family's old house, which he turned into a boarding house, having moved his family's possessions into the basement.

Mr. Palmer lives with two other boarders, Lisa (a nurse at a nearby hospital) and Steve, who unbeknownst to Palmer is a drug addict with a troubled family life. Both tenants withhold sordid secrets from Palmer – Lisa's past involves rape and theft, while Steve is stealing from the Palmer family's possessions to fund his addiction, which is supplemented by buying medical narcotics from Lisa.

Palmer continues to live a relatively happy life, until he smells an odd scent that appears to be only recognisable by himself. Finding its source swiftly becomes an obsession. Tracing it ostensibly to Lisa's room, Palmer reads her private diary and discovers her secrets before succumbing to the scent. Removing all traces of his trespass, Palmer discovers a minute – but familiar – hole in Lisa's wall abutting the basement. Locating an old camera, he begins to take a prurient interest in her, taking compromising candid photographs of her without her knowledge.

Subsequently, while hunting for items to fund his habit, Steve discovers Palmer's actions and approaches Lisa with a blackmail plot to entice Palmer into a compromising sexual situation (e.g. BDSM), which Steve could videotape and use to extort money from his landlord. Lisa, however, becomes fond of Palmer who soon feels able to confide in her his own sordid secret. Having taken a similar unhealthy interest in his sister in his youth, Palmer (when discovered) had murdered his sister, concocting a convenient tableaux to shift blame from himself.

Having recorded this confession, Steve confronts both Palmer and Lisa with his blackmail intentions and a final three-way confrontation unfolds.
