= Time Flies (comics) =

- Cover to 2000 AD Extreme Edition #19, 2006 featuring Time Flies. Art by Henry Flint.
- Created by: Garth Ennis; Philip Bond

Publication information
- Publisher: Originally IPC Media (Fleetway) until 1999, thereafter Rebellion Developments
- Schedule: Weekly
Title(s)
2000 AD
- Genre: Science fiction
- Publication date: October 1990 – December 1996
- Number of issues: 700-711; 1015-1023
- Main character(s): Trace 'Tracer' Bullet, Bertie Sharp

Creative team
- Writer(s): Garth Ennis
- Artist(s): Philip Bond; Jon Beeston; Roger Langridge
- Letterer(s): Gordon Robson; Steve Potter
- Colourist(s): Simon Jacob
- Editor(s): Tharg (Richard Burton / David Bishop)

Time Flies is a time travel comedy series published in the comic anthology 2000 AD. It was created by Garth Ennis and Philip Bond, and first appeared in 1990.

== Publication history ==
Time Flies was the first Garth Ennis story published in 2000 AD after he moved from its short-lived sister title Crisis. The sequel story "Tempus Fugitive" was shelved for five years before it was published in 1996 and was printed mainly for financial reasons. The publisher had a policy that if work that had been paid for it had to be published.

Although admiring of Philip Bond's artwork Ennis has said about Time Flies, "I think if you examine it in detail I think you'll find it was, in fact, crap." By the time "Tempus Fugitive" was published he had established a much more successful career, especially with Hellblazer and Preacher. Philip Bond quit the sequel before finishing and was replaced by Jon Beeston, Roger Langridge and Simon Jacob.

== Plot summary ==
The story is set in a utopian 36th Century. The Time Investigation Team protect time from temporal disruptions caused by time pirates. In the original story Hermann Göring is held for ransom by the time pirate Captain Whitewash. The day is saved by Trace Bullet and the World War II bomber pilot Bertie Sharp. In "Tempus Fugitive" the zombie of Trace's ex-husband Cutty O'Sark attempts to assassinate the Time Investigation Team members who were previously on the Göring mission.

== Publications ==
- "Time Flies" (in #700-711, 1990)
- "Tempus Fugitive" (with Philip Bond, Jon Beeston and Roger Langridge, in #1015-1023, 1996)

Both stories were reprinted in 2000 AD Extreme Edition #19, 2006
