= Vimanarama =

- Philip Bond's cover for the Vimanarama trade.

Publication information
- Publisher: Vertigo Comics
- Schedule: Monthly
- Format: Miniseries
- Publication date: 2005
- No. of issues: 3

Creative team
- Written by: Grant Morrison
- Artist: Philip Bond

Vimanarama is a three-issue fictional comic book miniseries written by Grant Morrison, with art by Philip Bond, and published by the Vertigo imprint of DC Comics. Set in the United Kingdom, it follows the story of Ali, a British Asian man who must confront ancient monsters inspired by Indian folklore, as well as more mundane crises in his family and personal life.

== Synopsis ==
The comic tells the story of Ali, a young British Asian man awaiting the arrival of his unseen arranged marriage. A baby in his family accidentally opens a path to the centre of the Earth, unleashing ancient monsters that are determined to destroy the world. Only the Ultra-Hadeen, a team of ancient and somewhat naive superheroes, can stop them.

Ali must also deal with several personal family crises, most of them influenced by the presence of the super-beings.

== Influences ==
The story is a Jack Kirby-like (in particular his ancient astronaut series The Eternals) take on ancient Indian tales, for example the Vedas (a vimana as a flying plane) and Mahabharata. It also has an Arabian Nights-style romance mixed with a large dash of psychedelia and general oddness.

Morrison has said that the idea arose when his research into Islam led him on to the ancient epic tales of India and some of the more speculative theories of people like David Hatcher Childress. He states: "I just liked the idea of taking all the pomp and high holiness of one of the world's great religions...and turning it into a Jack Kirby comic".

== Reception ==
Vimanarama has received mostly positive reviews. Critics praised the series's imaginative original setting, its humour, its bright and high-quality illustrations, and its story and characters. However, some reviewers criticized it for attempting to fit too many ideas into too short of a series, leaving elements of the story underdeveloped.

== Publications ==
Released in three parts, starting in February 2005, Vimanarama was subsequently collected into a single volume that was released in January 2006:

- US (Vertigo ISBN 1-4012-0496-1)
- UK (Titan Books ISBN 1-84576-207-X)
