= Dandridge (character) =

Doctor Spartacus Dandridge is a fictional character appearing in British comic anthology 2000 AD, created by Alec Worley and Warren Pleece. First appearing in a Past Imperfect story in 2009, Dandridge has since become a ghost tracking and destroying evil spirits and poltergeist, aided by his assistant, Shelley.

== Characters ==
- Doctor Spartacus Dandridge - A ghost hunter
- Shelley - Dandridge's assistant

== Bibliography ==
- Past Imperfect: Antiquus Phantasma (with Warren Pleece, in 2000 AD #1631, 2009)
- Dandridge
  - Return of the Chap (with Warren Pleece, in 2000 AD #1710-1714, 2010)
  - The House That Dripped Devilry! (with Warren Pleece, in 2000 AD #1726-1730, 2011)
  - A Christmas Ghost Story (with Warren Pleece, in 2000 AD #2012, 2011)
  - The Copper Conspiracy (with Warren Pleece, in 2000 AD #1824-1831, 2013)
