= Kill Your Boyfriend =

Comic book one-shot

- Cover of Kill Your Boyfriend one-shot, art by Philip Bond.

Publication information
- Publisher: Vertigo
- Format: One-shot
- Genre: Romance, black comedy
- Publication date: June 1995
- No. of issues: 1

Creative team
- Created by: Grant Morrison; Philip Bond; D'Israeli
- Written by: Grant Morrison
- Penciller: Philip Bond
- Inker(s): Philip Bond; D'Israeli
- Letterer: Ellie De Ville
- Editor(s): Helen Craven; Jennifer Lee; Tim Pilcher; Art Young

Kill Your Boyfriend is the title of a comic book one-shot written by Grant Morrison and drawn by Philip Bond and D'Israeli for DC Comics Vertigo imprint in June 1995.

== Publication history ==
Originally published as part of the Vertigo Voices series of one-shots in 1995, Kill Your Boyfriend was reprinted in the prestige format (ISBN 156389453X) in 1998 with an afterword from Morrison and a paper fortune teller. A third edition was published in October 2008.

== Synopsis ==
The story is a darkly comic satire of British youth culture which revolves around a bookish middle class schoolgirl, who has a bland unexciting life until she meets a strange young boy who convinces her to kill her boyfriend. They then go on the run together for a series of anarchic adventures across Britain.

Meeting up with a group of travellers in a double-decker bus, the pair indulge in more crime and sexual experimentation before making their way to Blackpool to meet their final fate.

== Writing ==
Morrison notes in the afterword of the second edition that the story is inspired in part by the myth of Dionysus.

== Reception ==
In 2013, ComicsAlliance ranked Boy as #10 on their list of the "50 Sexiest Male Characters in Comics". One critic draws parallels with such films as Natural Born Killers.
