= Mark Russell (writer) =

American author and comic book writer

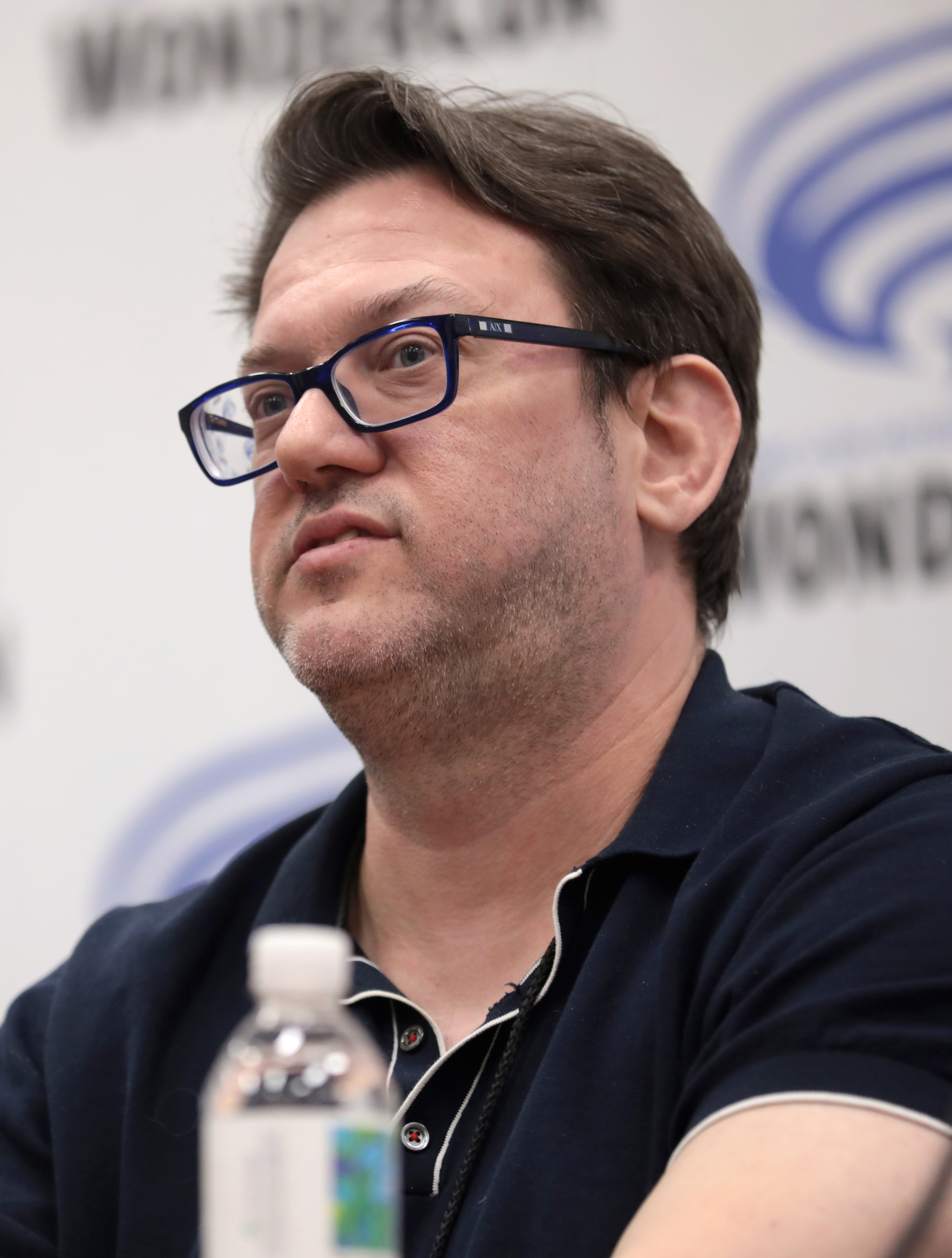
- Russell at WonderCon in 2023
- Born: 1971 (age 54–55); Portland, Oregon, U.S.
- Occupations: Author; Comic book writer
- Years active: 2015–present
- Notable work: The Flintstones; Batman: Dark Age; Exit, Stage Left!: The Snagglepuss Chronicles
- Website: markrussellbooks.com

Mark Russell (born 1971) is an American author and comic book writer.

== Books ==
Russell is the author of God Is Disappointed in You (Top Shelf Productions, 2013), a modern retelling of the Bible with cartoons by The New Yorker cartoonist Shannon Wheeler. He also wrote Apocrypha Now, a book about non-canonical Christian and Jewish texts.

== Comics ==
In 2015, Russell wrote a reboot of the 1973–74 comic Prez (Issues 1–6, DC Comics), drawn by Ben Caldwell, which features a teenage president of the United States. He wrote The Flintstones comic book series for DC Comics, with art by Steve Pugh. The Flintstones was nominated for two Eisner Awards: Best Limited Series and Best Humor Publication and a Harvey Award for Book of the Year.

Russell's Exit, Stage Left!: The Snagglepuss Chronicles, drawn by Mike Feehan, presented the Hanna-Barbera character Snagglepuss as a gay southern Gothic playwright in 1950s New York and was published by DC Comics in 2018. Exit, Stage Left!: The Snagglepuss Chronicles received the 2019 GLAAD Award for Outstanding Comic. The series was nominated for the Eisner Award for Best Limited Series, with Russell also being nominated for Best Writer. In February 2019, DC's Wonder Comics line, curated by Brian Michael Bendis, published Russell's The Wonder Twins with artist Stephen Byrne. It was nominated for a 2020 Ringo Awards for Best Humor Comic. Also in 2019, Russell's comic, Second Coming, with artist Richard Pace was published by Ahoy Comics after initially being dropped by DC and Vertigo Comics.

The first volume of Second Coming, with an introduction by Patton Oswalt, was published in March 2020. Russell worked with Flintstones artist Steve Pugh on Billionaire Island. In 2021, Russell wrote Fantastic Four: Life Story for Marvel Comics, retelling the story of Marvel's first family decade by decade. He also released One-Star Squadron, drawn by Steve Lieber, about superheroes working in the marketplace, and Not All Robots with artist Mike Deodato, which won the 2022 Eisner Award for Best Humor Publication and was nominated for Best New Series.

In 2022, Russell released Superman: Space Age (DC Comics) with Mike Allred, which was nominated for the 2023 Eisner Award for Best Limited Series, and Traveling to Mars (Ablaze), nominated for the 2023 Eisner Award for Best New Series. Russell was nominated for the 2023 Eisner Award for Best Writer. Cereal, a horror-comedy series featuring characters based on cereal advertising monsters, was published by AHOY Comics in October 2023. In 2024, Russell and Mike Allred released Batman: Dark Age, serving a follow-up to Superman: Space Age.

Russell's other comics include a Red Sonja series (Dynamite Comics), Judge Dredd: Under Siege (IDW, 2018), The Lone Ranger: The Devil's Rope (Dynamite, 2018), Superman vs. Imperious Lex (DC, 2021), Incal: Psychoverse (Humanoids, 2022), One-Star Squadron (DC, 2022), Cereal (AHOY, 2023), Rumpus Room (AWA, 2023), Traveling to Mars (Ablaze, 2023), and Deadbox (Vault, 2024).

== Miscellaneous ==
In 2019, on Storytellers Telling Stories with Jude Brewer, Russell discussed his early work on Public Access Television.

In November 2020, he discussed Billionaire Island and Second Coming on Indie Comics Spotlight with Tony Farina and Mike Burton on the Comics in Motion podcast.

On September 16, 2021, Russell appeared on the YouTube channel "Lost'n Comics" to discuss his career.

In 2023, he published "Bunkbed Mishaps", a book of his original cartoons. In 2024, Russell appeared on The Comics Cube, Vladimir Popov's The Questionnaire Season 2, and Collectors Confessions on YouTube.
