= Not All Robots =

Comic book by Mark Russell and Mike Deodato

Not All Robots is a comic book written by Mark Russell and illustrated by Mike Deodato.

== Background ==
The five-issue comic book series was published by AWA Studios on August 4, 2021. The comic books were written by Mark Russell, illustrated by Mike Deodoto Jr., colored by Lee Loughridge, and lettered by Steve Wands. The title is a play on NotAllMen and the series is a saterical look at the toxic masculinity seen in the backlash to the MeToo movement. The comic books are a black comedy set in a dystopic future.

The plot is set in 2056 when all labor has been automated and is done by robots. Climate change has left most of the world in ruin and the remainder of society survives in small pockets. The protagonist is a robot named Razorball who is responsible for caring for the Walters family. In the book, the robots have become dissatisfied with their role in society.

== Reception ==
The comic book won an Eisner award for best humor publication at the 2022 San Diego Comic-Con. The comic book also won a Tripwire Award for best new series in 2022.
