= Kinetic (comics) =

Publication information
- Publisher: DC Focus
- Schedule: Monthly
- Format: Ongoing series
- Genre: Superhero
- Publication date: May – December 2004
- No. of issues: 8
- Main character: Tom Morell

Creative team
- Created by: Allan Heinberg; Kelley Puckett; Warren Pleece
- Written by: Kelley Puckett
- Artist: Warren Pleece

Collected editions
- Kinietic: ISBN 1-4012-0472-4

Kinetic was a comic book series created by Allan Heinberg, written by Kelley Puckett and Warren Pleece, and published by DC Focus, a short-lived imprint of DC Comics. It was cancelled after eight monthly issues in December 2004, with one editorial review calling the book "Unbreakable or Donnie Darko."

== Storyline ==
The series focused on Tom Morell, a high school boy suffering from a combination of medical conditions such as hemophilia, diabetes, muscular dystrophy and others. His life at school is characterized by constant mockery and abuse, and his home life consists of his highly protective mother who fears that he could die at any moment. As an escape from his normal life, Tom immerses himself in the adventures of his favorite comic book superhero, Kinetic. However, Tom suddenly manifests his own superpowers. The majority of the story focuses on his reactions to this sudden change and its dramatic effects on his life.

=== Story summary ===
After a bad first day a school, Tom Morell thinks of killing himself. He is hit by a semi-trailer truck and lives, but is in shock. He walks home and goes to bed. He wakes the next morning thinking the prior day a dream, but sees a clue that proves it was reality. While walking around school, he discovers that he is super-strong and invulnerable, two lifelong dreams. Later, when his mother discovers her son's super-powers, she reacts negatively at first, but later takes it in stride.

== Collected editions ==
The series has been collected into a trade paperback:

- Kinetic (collects Kinetic #1–8, 192 pages, 2005, ISBN 1-4012-0472-4)
