= Shelly Bond =

Comic book editor

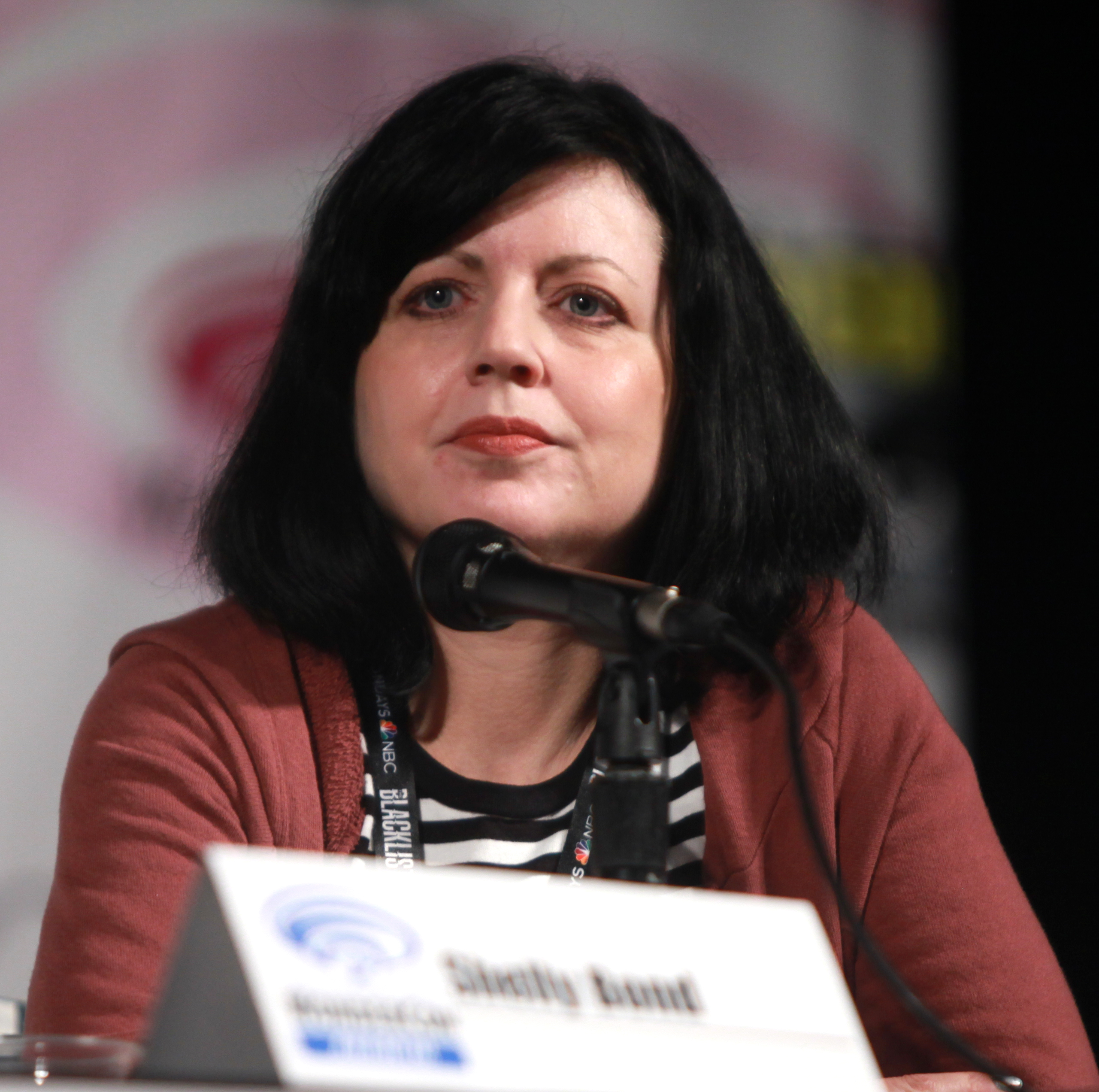
- Shelly Bond at the 2014 WonderCon
- Born: Shelly Roeberg
- Area: Editor
- Spouse: Philip Bond (m. 2000)

Shelly Bond (born Roeberg) is an American comic book editor, known for her two decades at DC Comics' Vertigo (DC Comics) imprint, for which she was executive editor from 2013 to 2016.

== Career ==
Bond became interested in comic books as a film student at Ithaca College when a screenwriting instructor used an issue of Peter Gross's Empire Lanes as an example of what film storyboards look like. After college she struggled to find a job in the film industry, and ended up instead working as an editorial assistant for editor Diana Schutz at the comics publisher Comico. The 1989 E-Man special was the first title she edited.

Three months after her move to Comico, the company declared bankruptcy and Schultz and editor-in-chief Bob Schreck left for Dark Horse Comics. Bond at 22 years of age, was left in charge of the editorial department where she worked with Mike Allred, Steven T. Seagle, Matt Wagner, and Bill Willingham at Comico, all of whom she would work with later at Vertigo.

In winter of 1992 she landed a job as an assistant editor for Karen Berger at Vertigo Comics. Bond worked on many of Vertigo's top titles over the course of her tenure, including The Sandman, Shade, the Changing Man, Wagner and Seagle's Sandman Mystery Theatre, Allred's iZombie, Dean Motter's Terminal City, Paul Pope's Heavy Liquid, Willingham Fables, Ed Brubaker's Deadenders, David Lapham's Young Liars, Mike Carey's Lucifer, and Grant Morrison's The Invisibles. Outside of Vertigo, she also edited the nine issues of Peter Bagge and Gilbert Hernandez's Yeah! (1999–2000) for DC's imprint Homage.

In 2008, Bond was given the Friends of Lulu Women of Distinction Award.

She was promoted to executive editor and vice president of Vertigo Comics in 2013, taking the place of Berger. In April 2016, DC announced that they had let Bond go after restructuring. "She is virtually a co-creator on everything I’ve worked on with her, though never credited beyond 'Editor,'" Allred wrote in 2016 in a tribute to Bond that featured many of the creators she worked with over the years. "Shelly will never get full credit for all of the amazing things she did at Vertigo."

In October, 2017 Bond launched a new imprint at IDW called Black Crown, where she published punk rock-inspired comic books connected to a fictional English pub, in October 2017. At Black Crown, Bond paired comics veterans with newer talent, for example matching Peter Milligan with Tess Fowler on Kid Lobotomy and Gilbert Hernandez with Tini Howard on Assassinistas. She also collaborated with Kristy Miller & Brian Miller on a crowdfunded comics anthology called Femme Magnifique, which featured biographies of famous women by creators like Kelly Sue DeConnick, Howard, Fowler, Hernandez, and Gerard Way. IDW shuttered Black Crown in 2019.

Since then, Bond and her husband Philip Bond have published new books, comics, and prints through their own company, Off Register, including Insider Art, a fundraiser anthology of comics works by women, non-binary, and marginalized creators; Will Potter and Philip Bond's Geezer; Filth & Grammar, a 162-page guide to making comics; and Fast Times in Comic Book Editing, Shelly Bond's memoirs of her time at Vertigo illustrated by a variety of comics artists.

== Personal life ==
She is married to artist Philip Bond, with whom she has a son.
