= The Horrorist (comics) =

- Cover of The Horrorist #1 (December 1995). Art by David Lloyd.

Publication information
- Publisher: Vertigo/DC Comics
- Schedule: Monthly
- Format: Limited series
- Genre: Horror
- Publication date: December 1995 - January 1996
- No. of issues: 2

Creative team
- Written by: Jamie Delano
- Artist: David Lloyd
- Colorist: Elitta Fell
- Editor: Stuart Moore

Collected editions
- The Devil You Know: ISBN 1-4012-1269-7

The Horrorist was an occult and horror-themed comic book limited series written by Jamie Delano, with art by David Lloyd, published by the DC Comics imprint Vertigo. It was a spin-off of Vertigo's popular Hellblazer series and features the character John Constantine. The book consisted of two 52-page issues without advertisements, published in December 1995 and January 1996 respectively.

== Plot ==
The story revolves around Angel, who as a young girl was rescued from war-torn Mozambique, and who witnessed the most unspeakable war crimes and atrocities. As an adult, in the present day, Angel becomes a "Horrorist", that is, someone who redistributes pain by unveiling to people the suffering of others. She travels America's roadways, annihilating people's solipsistic existence by exposing them to the unfettered scope of true oppression, famine and murder. Sometimes this takes the form of altered reality, such as several boys playing in the snow dying from landmines that were not there earlier.

Demonologist John Constantine is drawn to Angel, both sexually and psychologically, mostly out of a hope that she can penetrate his emotional numbness. While they have sex, Angel fills Constantine's mind with all the suffering in the world, emptying herself, which ultimately restores a bit of Constantine's lost humanity at the apparent cost of her life.

== Collected editions ==
The Horrorist was collected along with Hellblazer #10–13, and The Hellblazer Annual as The Devil You Know (ISBN 1-40121-269-7).
