= Vertigo Comics =

Imprint of comic-book publisher DC Comics

DC Vertigo
- Logo used since 2024
- Parent company: DC Comics
- Founded: 1993; 33 years ago (original); 2024; 2 years ago (revival)
- Founder: Karen Berger
- Defunct: 2020; 6 years ago (original)
- Country of origin: United States
- Headquarters location: New York City
- Publication types: Comic books
- Imprints: List: Vertigo Visions; Vertigo Voices; Vertigo Vérité; V2K; Vertigo Pop!; Vertigo X; Vertigo Crime
- Official website: www.dccomics.com/imprint/dc-vertigo

DC Vertigo, also known as Vertigo Comics or simply Vertigo, is an imprint of the American comic book publisher DC Comics. Vertigo publishes comics with adult content, such as nudity, drug use, profanity, and graphic violence, that do not fit the restrictions of DC's main line. Its comics include company-owned series set in the DC Universe, such as The Sandman, Swamp Thing, and Hellblazer, and creator-owned works, such as Preacher, Y: The Last Man, and Fables.

Vertigo originated from DC's 1980s adult comic line, which began after DC stopped submitting The Saga of the Swamp Thing for approval by the Comics Code Authority. Following the success of two adult-oriented 1986 limited series, Batman: The Dark Knight Returns and Watchmen, DC's output of adult comics, edited by Karen Berger, grew. By 1992, DC's mature readers' line was editorially separate from its main line and Berger received permission to manage them under a separate imprint. Vertigo was launched in January 1993 with a mix of existing DC ongoing series and new series.

Although its initial publications were primarily in the horror and fantasy genres, Vertigo expanded to publish works dealing with crime, social commentary, speculative fiction, biography, and other genres. Vertigo also reprinted comics previously published by DC under other imprints, such as V for Vendetta and Transmetropolitan. In North America, Vertigo pioneered a publishing model in which monthly series are periodically collected into editions for bookstore sale. Vertigo became DC's most popular and enduring imprint; several Vertigo series have won the comics industry's Eisner Award and have been adapted to film and television.

Vertigo began to decline in the 2010s, as certain properties like Hellblazer and Swamp Thing were re-integrated into DC's main comic books, while Berger departed in 2013. Berger's departure was followed by a series of editorial restructures. An attempted relaunch in 2018 suffered a multitude of setbacks, including numerous cancellations. DC discontinued Vertigo in January 2020 as part of a plan to publish all comics under a single banner. Most Vertigo series moved to DC Black Label until 2024, when DC revived the imprint.

== History ==
=== Development ===
Vertigo originated in 1993 under the stewardship of Karen Berger, a former literature and art history student, who had joined DC Comics in 1979 as an assistant editor. Berger edited proto-Vertigo titles from the start of her time with DC, beginning in 1981 with House of Mystery. She took over editorship of Alan Moore's Swamp Thing run from Swamp Thing co-creator Len Wein in 1984, and in 1986 "became DC's British liaison", bringing to DC's pre-Vertigo titles the individuals who would be instrumental in the creation and evolution of Vertigo seven years later, including Neil Gaiman, Jamie Delano, Peter Milligan, and Grant Morrison. She "found their sensibility and point of view to be refreshingly different, edgier and smarter" than those of most American comics writers.

Berger edited several new or revived series with these writers, including superhero/science fiction series such as Animal Man, Doom Patrol vol. 2, and Shade, the Changing Man vol. 2, fantasy series The Sandman vol. 2, and horror titles Hellblazer and The Saga of the Swamp Thing. She also edited limited series such as Kid Eternity, Black Orchid (Gaiman's first work for DC) and The Books of Magic limited series.

These six ongoing titles, all of which carried a "Suggested for Mature Readers" label on their covers, shared a sophistication-driven sensibility the comics fan media dubbed "the Bergerverse". In a 1992 editorial meeting with Paul Levitz, publisher Jenette Kahn, and managing editor Dick Giordano, Berger was given the mandate to place these titles under an imprint that, as Berger described, would "do something different in comics and help the medium 'grow up'". Several DC titles bearing the age advisory, such as Green Arrow, Blackhawk, and The Question (the last two cancelled before the launch of Vertigo), did not make the transition to the new imprint.

Meanwhile, Disney Comics and former DC editor Art Young had been developing an imprint to be called Touchmark Comics, analogous to Disney's mature-audiences Touchstone Pictures studio. This project was abandoned following the so-called "Disney Implosion" of 1991. Young and those works were brought into the Vertigo fold, allowing Berger to expand the imprint's publishing plans with the limited series Enigma, Sebastian O, Mercy, and Shadows Fall.

=== Initial year ===
Vertigo was launched in January 1993 with a mixture of existing ongoing series continued under the new imprint, new ongoing and limited series, and single-volume collections or graphic novels. Their publishing plan for the first year involved two new titles – whether ongoing/limited series or one-shots – each month. The existing series (cover date March 1993) were Shade, the Changing Man (starting with #33), The Sandman (#47), Hellblazer (#63), Animal Man (#57), Swamp Thing (#129), and Doom Patrol (#64, with new writer Rachel Pollack).

The first comic book published under the "Vertigo" imprint was the first issue of Death: The High Cost of Living, a three-issue series by Neil Gaiman and Chris Bachalo. The second new title was the first issue of Enigma, an 8-issue limited series initially planned to launch Touchmark, written by Peter Milligan (also author of Shade, the Changing Man) and drawn by Duncan Fegredo, the artist from Grant Morrison's earlier Kid Eternity limited series. The following month saw the debut of Sandman: Mystery Theatre by Matt Wagner and Steven T. Seagle, and illustrated primarily by Guy Davis, described as "playing the '30s with a '90s feel... haunting, film noir-ish...", and starring original Sandman Wesley Dodds in a title whose "sensibilities echo crime genre fiction". Joining it was J. M. DeMatteis and Paul Johnson's 64-page one-shot Mercy.

New series that began in the months that followed include Kid Eternity (ongoing) by Ann Nocenti and Sean Phillips (continuing from the earlier Morrison-penned limited series), Grant Morrison and Steve Yeowell's three-issue steampunk limited series Sebastian O (another ex-Touchmark project), Skin Graft by Jerry Prosser and Warren Pleece, The Last One by DeMatteis and Dan Sweetman, Jonah Hex: Two-Gun Mojo by Tim Truman and Sam Glanzman, Black Orchid (ongoing) by Dick Foreman and Jill Thompson (continuing from the earlier Gaiman/McKean limited series), The Extremist by Peter Milligan and Ted McKeever, Scarab by John Smith with Scot Eaton and Mike Barreiro, and The Children's Crusade, a crossover involving several of the imprint's ongoing series. The Books of Magic limited series was relaunched as an ongoing series written by John Ney Rieber, and illustrated by Peter Gross (later also writer), Gary Amaro, and Peter Snejbjerg.

Although the books did not have a consistent "house style" of art, the cover designs of early Vertigo series featured a uniform trade dress with a vertical bar along the left side, which included the imprint logo, pricing, date, and issue numbers. The design layout continued with very little variation until issues cover-dated July 2002 (including Fables #1) which introduced an across-the-top layout ahead of 2003's "Vertigo X" 10th anniversary celebration. The "distinctive design" was intended to be used on "all Vertigo books except the hardcovers, trade paperbacks, and graphic novels". Berger noted that DC was "very" committed to the line, having put a "lot of muscle behind" promoting it, including a promotional launch kit made available to "[r]etailers who order[ed] at least 25 copies of the February issue of Sandman [#47]", a "platinum edition" variant cover for Death: The High Cost of Living #1 and a 75-cent Vertigo Preview comic featuring a specially written seven-page Sandman story by Gaiman and Kent Williams. In addition, a 16-page Vertigo Sampler was also produced and bundled with copies of Capital City Distribution's Advance Comics solicitation index.

Vertigo publications generally did not take place in a shared universe, but several of the early series which had begun as part of the main DC Universe had a "crossover" in 1993-94: The Children's Crusade. The event "did not yield smashing results" or garner many positive reviews, in large part due to its "gimmicky" nature, which ran counter to Vertigo's quirky, non-mainstream appeal and customer-base. The event was defended as "no marketing ploy" by one of the event's editors, Lou Stathis, who wrote of his dislike of the often "crass manipulation" of crossover events, defending The Children's Crusade as having come not from marketing, but the writers' minds, and therefore being "story-driven" rather than manipulative. The crossover did not become an annual event, however — indeed, "annuals" linked to Vertigo series rarely reappeared after this event.

Works previously published by DC under other imprints, but which fit the general character of Vertigo, have been reprinted under this imprint. This has included V for Vendetta, earlier issues of Vertigo's ongoing launch series, and books from discontinued imprints such as Transmetropolitan (initially under DC's short-lived sci-fi Helix imprint) and A History of Violence (originally part of the Paradox Press line).

Two of the new ongoing series did not last long: Kid Eternity was cancelled after 16 issues, and Black Orchid continued for only 22. Sandman Mystery Theatre and most of the pre-existing series continued for several years, including Sandman which reached its planned conclusion with #75. Hellblazer was the last of the original ongoing series to be canceled, ceasing publication in February 2013 with #300.

Berger won Eisner Awards for her editing in 1992, 1994 and 1995 for her work on the proto- and early Vertigo titles Sandman, Shade, Kid Eternity, Books of Magic, Death: The High Cost of Living and Sandman Mystery Theatre.

=== Middle period ===
As the imprint's initial ongoing series came to their ends, new series were launched to replace them, with varying degrees of success. The Sandman was replaced following its completion by The Dreaming (1996–2001) and The Sandman Presents, which featured stories about the characters from Neil Gaiman's series, written by other creators. Other long-running series have been The Invisibles by Grant Morrison and various artists (1994–2000); Preacher by Garth Ennis and Steve Dillon (1995–2000); Transmetropolitan by Warren Ellis and Darick Robertson (1997–2002); 100 Bullets by Brian Azzarello and Eduardo Risso (1999–2009); Lucifer by Mike Carey, Peter Gross, and Ryan Kelly (2000–2006); Y: The Last Man by Brian K. Vaughan and Pia Guerra (2002–2008); Daytripper by Fábio Moon and Gabriel Bá (2010); DMZ by Brian Wood and Riccardo Burchielli (2005–2012); and Fables by Bill Willingham, Mark Buckingham, and various other artists (2002–2015), which launched spin-offs including Jack of Fables by Willingham, Lilah Sturges (credited as "Matthew Sturges"), and various artists (2006–2011), and Fairest by Willingham and various artists (2012–2015).

In 2003, the Vertigo imprint celebrated its 10th anniversary by branding its books cover-dated April 2003 to February 2004 (i.e. released between February and December 2003) with the label Vertigo X. This special subtitle was debuted on the Vertigo X Anniversary Preview (April 2003), a 48-page special previewing Vertigo's upcoming projects and featuring a short Shade, the Changing Man story by Peter Milligan and Mike Allred. Other projects highlighted included Death: At Death's Door, Jill Thompson's first manga-ized version of the "Season of Mists" storyline, and Gaiman's own return to the mythos with the hardcover Sandman: Endless Nights collection of short stories spotlighting the seven members of the Endless (an eight-page Endless Nights Preview issue was also released before the hardcover).

Berger oversaw the entire Vertigo line, and she was promoted to the position of "Senior Vice President—Executive Editor, Vertigo" in July 2006. Her promotion came as Vertigo was said to be equivalent to "the fourth largest American comic book publisher" in 2005, with Paul Levitz praising her personally as having "built Vertigo into an imprint which is simultaneously one of comics' leading creative and commercial successes".

The financial success of many Vertigo titles relied not on monthly issue sales but on the subsequent "trade paperback" editions that reprinted the monthly comics in volumes, which were also sold in general-interest bookshops. Vertigo's success in popularizing this approach, beginning with Sandman, led to a wider take-up in the American comics industry of routinely reprinting monthly series in this format.

==== Vertigo Visions ====
Vertigo Visions was an irregular series of self-contained short stories featuring characters from the DC Universe, reinterpreted or recontextualized.

- Vertigo Visions: The Geek (June 1993) by Rachel Pollack and Mike Allred
- Vertigo Visions: Phantom Stranger (October 1993) by Alisa Kwitney and Guy Davis
- Vertigo Visions: Doctor Occult (July 1994) by Dave Louapre and Dan Sweetman
- Vertigo Visions: Prez (September 1995) by Ed Brubaker and Eric Shanower
- Vertigo Visions: Tomahawk (July 1998) by Rachel Pollack and Tom Yeates
- Vertigo Visions: Doctor Thirteen (September 1998) by Matt Howarth and Michael Avon Oeming

Vertigo Visions: Artwork from the Cutting Edge of Comics was a 2000 collection of artwork from various Vertigo titles, with commentary by Alisa Kwitney.

==== Vertigo Voices ====
The Vertigo Voices featured creator-owned "distinctive one-shot stories".

- Face (Jan. 1995) by Peter Milligan and Duncan Fegredo, a horror story involving plastic surgery.
- Tainted (Feb. 1995) by Jamie Delano and Al Davison, a Kafkaesque tale involving repressed memories, blackmail, and murder.
- Kill Your Boyfriend (June 1995) by Grant Morrison and Philip Bond (with D'Israeli), the protagonist takes on the persona projected by her new, murderous, bad-boy boyfriend.
- The Eaters (Nov. 1995) by Milligan and Dean Ormston, a black comedy dealing with a family of cannibals.

==== Vertigo Vérité ====
The short-lived "Vérité" line, evoking the realism of Cinéma vérité, "was a 1996–98 attempt to promote new Vertigo projects devoid of the supernatural qualities that had gotten to define the publisher".

- Seven Miles a Second (May 1996) by David Wojnarowicz and James Romberger, published after Wojnarowicz' death from AIDS, about his experiences of living with the disease.
- The System #1–3 (May–July 1996) by Peter Kuper, dealt wordlessly with "class warfare in the big city".
- Girl #1–3 (July–September 1996) by Peter Milligan and Duncan Fegredo, a hyper-realistic tale of a disaffected teenage girl prone to "all-consuming daydreams...needed to cope with life itself" caught up in a tale of murder and mundanity.
- The Unseen Hand #1–4 (September–December 1996) by Terry LaBan and Ilya, a college student caught up in an Illuminati-like conspiracy.
- Hell Eternal (April 1998) by Jamie Delano and Sean Phillips

==== V2K ====
The "fifth-week event" brand V2K (Vertigo 2000), was a "much hyped concept" whose titles were designed to "usher...in the new millennium" and, as such, several of them were limited series rather than one-shots.

- Brave Old World #1–4 (February–May 2000) by William Messner-Loebs, Guy Davis and Phil Hester
- The Four Horsemen #1–4 (February–May 2000) by Robert Rodi and Esad Ribić
- I Die at Midnight by Kyle Baker
- Pulp Fantastic #1–3 (February–April 2000) by Howard Chaykin with David Tischman and Rick Burchett
- Totems by Tom Peyer with Richard Case, Duncan Fegredo, and Dean Ormston

==== Vertigo Pop! ====
The Vertigo Pop limited series were designed "to be about pop culture around the globe in some vaguely defined way".

- Vertigo Pop: Tokyo #1–4 (September–December 2002) by Jonathan Vankin and Seth Fisher
- Vertigo Pop: London #1–4 (January–April 2003) by Peter Milligan and Philip Bond
- Vertigo Pop: Bangkok #1–4 (July–October 2003) by Vankin and Giuseppe Camuncoli

==== Vertigo Crime ====
Vertigo Crime, a line of graphic novels published in black and white, and hardcover, was launched in 2009 with two titles: Brian Azzarello's Filthy Rich and Ian Rankin's Dark Entries, the latter featuring John Constantine. Each volume features a cover illustration by Lee Bermejo. Vertigo Crime ended as a sub-imprint in 2011.

The following original graphic novels have been published under the Vertigo Crime imprint (in order of publication):

- Filthy Rich by Brian Azzarello and Victor Santos, 2009
- Dark Entries by Ian Rankin and Werther Dell'Edera, 2009
- The Chill by Jason Starr and Mick Bertilorenzi, 2010
- The Bronx Kill by Peter Milligan and James Romberger, 2010
- Area 10 by Christos N. Gage and Chris Samnee, 2010
- The Executor by Jon Evans and Andrea Mutti, 2010
- Fogtown by Andersen Gabrych and Brad Rader, 2010
- A Sickness in the Family by Denise Mina and Antonio Fuso, 2010
- Rat Catcher by Andy Diggle and Victor Ibanez, 2011
- Noche Roja by Simon Oliver and Jason Latour, 2011
- 99 Days by Matteo Casali and Kristian Donaldson, 2011
- Cowboys by Gary Phillips and Brian Hurtt, 2011
- Return to Perdition by Max Allan Collins, 2011

=== Editorial changes, attempted relaunch, and discontinuation ===
Karen Berger left the company in March 2013. Berger's position at the head of Vertigo was filled by Shelly Bond, who had begun editing for the imprint in 1993. In 2016, however, DC "restructured" Vertigo, eliminating Bond's position, and oversight of Vertigo was placed under Jamie S. Rich, until May 2017 when Mark Doyle became the new editor.

In 2018, DC Comics began a "line-wide relaunch and rebranding" as "DC Vertigo", including 11 new ongoing titles planned for the coming year, under Doyle's editorship. These included a new sub-imprint based on Neil Gaiman's Sandman with four new ongoing series, announced in March, and seven new series announced in June.

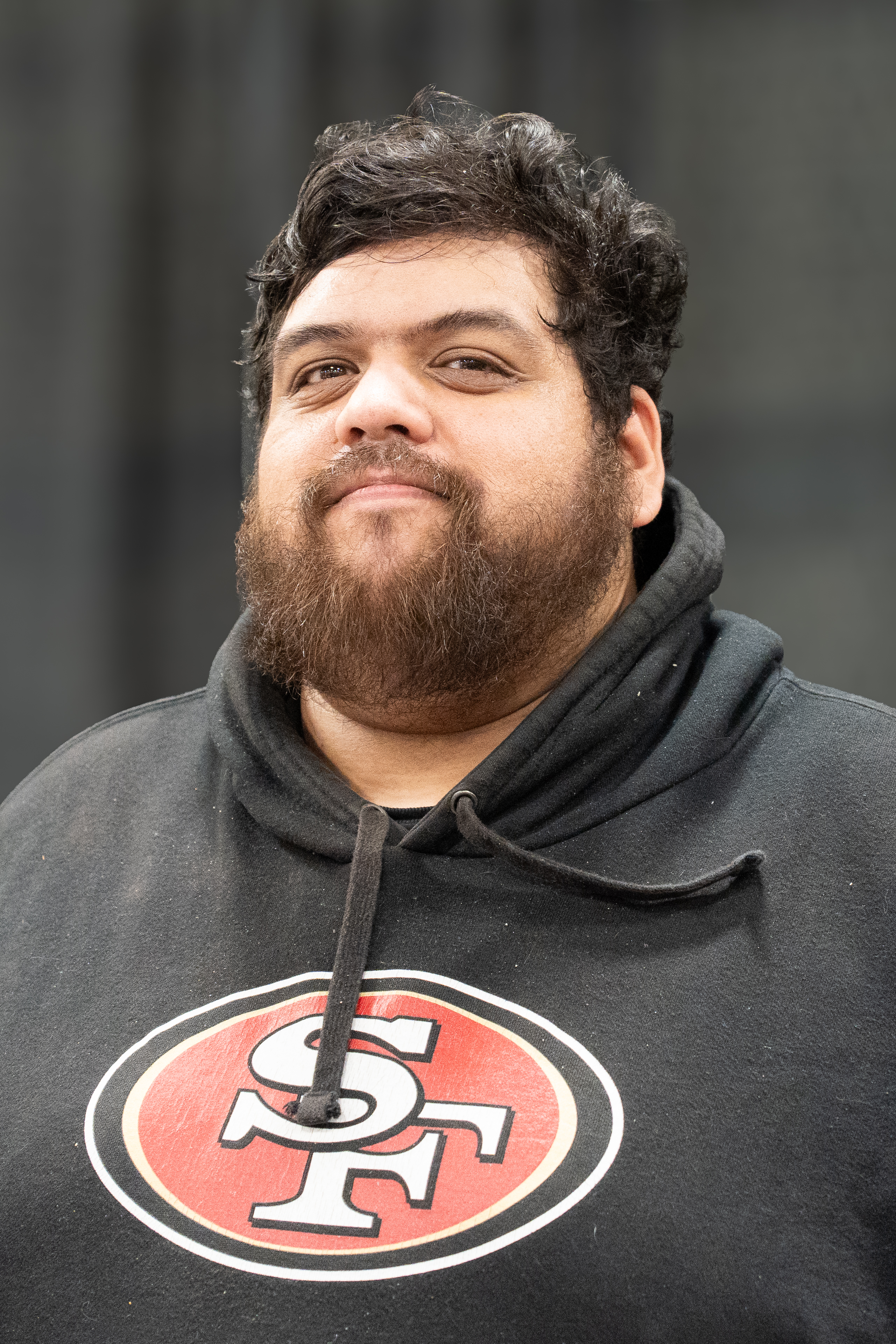
Ramon Villalobos at Comic Con Oakland 2026

The relaunch experienced a number of complications. Border Town by Eric M. Esquivel and Ramon Villalobos dealt with immigration and Latino identity, for which Esquivel received death threats in advance of its publication. The series was well received by critics, but after four issues were published, Esquivel was accused of sexually and emotionally abusing a former partner. Villalobos and colorist Tamra Bonvillain withdrew from the project, and DC cancelled the series, including issues that were ready for publication. Meanwhile, Second Coming by Mark Russell and Richard Pace came under criticism from Christians and conservatives who considered its announced premise – in which Jesus Christ returns and lives as a roommate with a modern-day superhero – blasphemous and offensive. The series was cancelled before the first issue was published; Russell and Pace later published the series through Ahoy Comics. Safe Sex by Tina Horn and Mike Dowling was also cancelled before its debut, and later published as SFSX by Image Comics.

DC Comics discontinued the Vertigo imprint in January 2020. The DC Zoom and DC Ink imprints for children and young adolescents were also eliminated. Under the new plan, all of the company's comics were published under the "DC" brand, and categorized by intended reader age: DC Kids (8–12 years), DC (13+), and DC Black Label (17+). The Sandman-related titles retained their new branding as "The Sandman Universe".

=== 2024 relaunch ===
In 2024, DC relaunched the Vertigo imprint, with Chris Conroy, editor of DC Black Label, as main editor. In addition, James Tynion IV and Álvaro Martínez Bueno's series The Nice House by the Sea was transferred from DC Black Label to Vertigo. The Sandman Universe line of books was folded back into the imprint as well.

In 2025, at New York Comic Con, DC officially unveiled their first line of titles for the Vertigo revival: Bleeding Hearts by Deniz Camp and Stipan Morian, End of Life by Kyle Starks and Steve Pugh, The Peril of the Brutal Dark: An Ezra Cain Mystery by Chris Condon and Jacob Philips, 100 Bullets: The US of Anger by Brian Azzarello and Eduardo Risso, Black Tower: The Raven Conspiracy by Ram V and Mike Perkins, Necretaceous by Tom Taylor and Darick Robertson, Fanatic by Grace Ellis and Hannah Templer, The Crying Doll by Mariko Tamaki and Rosemary Valero-O'Connell, and A Walking Shadow by Simon Spurrier and Aaron Campbell.

== Creators ==
=== Editors ===
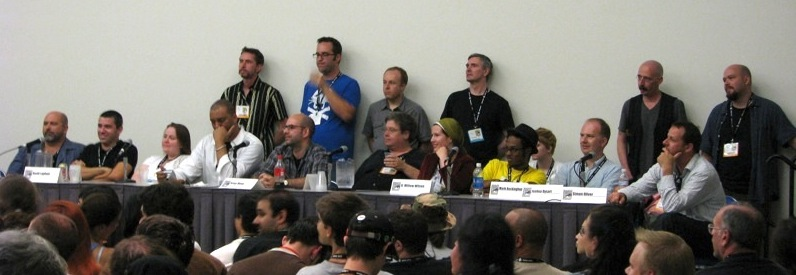
Panel of Vertigo comics creators at San Diego ComicCon 2007.

In addition to Berger, several other editors have become linked to the imprint:

Art Young started out as Karen Berger's assistant and worked on pre-Vertigo issues of Animal Man, Hellblazer, Swamp Thing, The Sandman, Doom Patrol, The Books of Magic, Skreemer, and Kid Eternity. He then left DC in 1991 to work for Disney in setting up Touchmark, before returning with those projects to Vertigo in early 1993, when he edited debut title Enigma, and later miniseries and one-shots such as Sebastian O, The Extremist, Mercy, Rogan Gosh, The Mystery Play, and Tank Girl: The Moovy. He edited all four of the "Vertigo Voices" titles in 1995, as well as Shadows Fall, Ghostdancing, Egypt, Millennium Fever and both Tank Girl miniseries. Young's last editorial credit for Vertigo was Flex Mentallo #1 (June 1996).

Shelly Bond was Vertigo's executive editor until 2016. Berger hired her as an assistant editor in the winter of 1992, making her the last of the original Vertigo team to join. Bond worked on many of Vertigo's top titles over the course of her tenure, including The Sandman, Shade, the Changing Man, Sandman Mystery Theatre, iZombie, Paul Pope's Heavy Liquid, Fables, Ed Brubaker's Deadenders, David Lapham's Young Liars, Mike Carey's Lucifer, and The Invisibles. She was promoted to executive editor and vice president of Vertigo Comics in 2013, taking the place of Berger. In April 2016, Bond was fired by DC Comics after restructuring. "Shelly will never get full credit for all of the amazing things she did at Vertigo", Mike Allred wrote in 2016 in a tribute to Bond that featured many of the creators she worked with over the years.

Tom Peyer was a founding editor of Vertigo. Tom was editor in 1990 with Karen Berger what would become the pillars of Vertigo: Hellblazer, Sandman (taking over from Art Young), Swamp Thing and Shade, the Changing Man. He later edited Doom Patrol, Animal Man, Kid Eternity, and Black Orchid, as well as two "Vertigo Visions" one-shots. Peyer left editing behind in 1994, returning to DC as a writer.

Stuart Moore edited a wide range of Vertigo titles between 1991 and 2000, including Swamp Thing, Books of Magic, Hellblazer, The Invisibles, Preacher and Transmetropolitan. One of his most important contributions to the line was hiring Garth Ennis to write Hellblazer. He helped start the DC imprint Helix, and brought Transmetropolitan to Vertigo after Helix's demise.

Axel Alonso began his editorial career at Vertigo editing titles like Hellblazer, Brian Azzarello and Eduardo Risso's 100 Bullets, and Garth Ennis and Steve Dillon's Preacher. He left Vertigo for Marvel Comics in 2000 and eventually ascended to the role of editor-in-chief, a title he held until 2017.

Will Dennis attended film school with Bond, who later recruited him as an assistant editor. He was promoted to editor a few months after Alonso departured for Marvel. Dennis took over the editing of 100 Bullets and later edited Brian K. Vaughan and Pia Guerra's Y: The Last Man and Vaughan's Pride of Baghdad graphic novel. Dennis was responsible for bringing writers Brian Wood (DMZ) and Jason Aaron (Scalped) to Vertigo and teamed writer Andy Diggle and artist Jock on their breakout series The Losers. He was the editor who presided over the Vertigo Crime line of graphic novels.

Jonathan Vankin was hired as an editor at Vertigo in 2004 after previously writing two of the line's Vertigo Pop miniseries and several entries in the Paradox Press "Big Book" series as well as several other non-comics works. He edited Harvey Pekar's Vertigo work: The Quitter hardcover and eight issues of Pekar's American Splendor autobiographical series. His other Vertigo editing credits include The Exterminators, Douglas Rushkoff's Testament, novelist Denise Mina's run on Hellblazer, Incognegro by Mat Johnson, and The Alcoholic by novelist and essayist Jonathan Ames.

Chris Conroy was hired as an editor at the newly revived Vertigo in 2024 after previously being an editor on DC Black Label.

=== Writers ===
==== Early writers ====
Alan Moore is strongly associated with the imprint for his work on Swamp Thing and his creation of John Constantine, but he never produced work for the Vertigo imprint, having refused to work for parent company DC in the late 1980s. His Swamp Thing work and the V for Vendetta reprint-maxiseries were retroactively collected as Vertigo-issued TPBs.

Grant Morrison left Animal Man and Doom Patrol before the launch of Vertigo, but their work on those titles was similarly retroactively branded as "Vertigo" when collected. They wrote three volumes of The Invisibles between 1994 and 2000. In addition, they had produced a number of one-shots and miniseries including Sebastian O (1993), The Mystery Play (1994), Kill Your Boyfriend (1995), the Doom Patrol spin-off Flex Mentallo (1996), The Filth (2002–2003), Seaguy (2004), Vimanarama (2005), We3 (2004–2005) and Joe the Barbarian (2010).

Neil Gaiman came to prominence four years pre-Vertigo with the launch of The Sandman for DC Comics, a title that became the backbone of the initial Vertigo line-up. His Death mini-series was part of the Vertigo launch, and his work on the first The Books of Magic miniseries (also released as a DC title, 1990–1991) laid the groundwork for the long-running Vertigo Universe series of the same name, which featured young wizard Timothy Hunter.

Peter Milligan contributed two titles to the Vertigo launch. His Shade, the Changing Man was launched in 1991, pre-Vertigo, and ran 70 issues until 1996, by which time it was under the Vertigo imprint. He also wrote the creator-owned eight-issue miniseries Enigma (1993). Milligan and Brett Ewins's 1989 mini-series Skreemer was subsequently collected by Vertigo. Milligan also wrote both a Human Target mini-series and ongoing series, the one-shots The Eaters and Face for the "Vertigo Voices" sub-imprint, and a number of other miniseries, including The Extremist, Tank Girl: The Odyssey, Egypt, Girl, The Minx, and Vertigo Pop!: London.

Jamie Delano was the original writer of Vertigo's flagship series Hellblazer, which spun-off from Moore's run on Swamp Thing. Moore himself recommended Jamie Delano for Hellblazer. Delano left the series in 1991, before the launch of Vertigo, and was writing the imprint's Animal Man series at the time. His other Vertigo works included Outlaw Nation, Ghostdancing, and two Hellblazer miniseries, The Horrorist and Hellblazer Special: Bad Blood.

Garth Ennis took over Hellblazer from Delano and wrote it at the time of Vertigo's launch. Ennis's best-known Vertigo work was his and artist Steve Dillon's creator-owned Preacher, which ran for 66 issues and six spin-off specials between 1995 and 2000. Ennis has also written several miniseries for Vertigo, including Goddess (1995–96), Pride & Joy (1997), Unknown Soldier (1997), and Adventures in the Rifle Brigade (2001–2002), as well as eight one-shot War Stories between 2001 and 2003. Two of his pre-Vertigo works — True Faith (serialized in Crisis) and the four-issue DC/Helix miniseries Bloody Mary (1996–1997) – have had collections released under the Vertigo label.

Rachel Pollack, who was writing Doom Patrol when Vertigo launched, continued on that title until #87 (Feb. 1995), the final issue. She is known for creating the first openly trans superhero, Coagula. She also penned two "Vertigo Visions" specials — 1993's The Geek and 1998's Tomahawk.

Nancy A. Collins, who wrote Swamp Thing #110–138 (Aug. 1991 – Dec. 1993), also wrote the 1996 one-shot Dhampire: Stillborn.

Matt Wagner wrote the early Vertigo series Sandman Mystery Theatre and co-wrote the Sandman Midnight Theatre special with Neil Gaiman. Wagner later wrote the 29-issue Madame Xanadu series.

==== Later writers ====
John Ney Rieber has produced most of his output for Vertigo, working exclusively for the company between 1994 and 2000. Reiber wrote the first 50 issues of the first ongoing The Books of Magic series (May 1994 – July 1998), as well as a number of miniseries, mostly set in the wider Vertigo universe (and particularly the Sandman/Books of Magic sections) – Mythos: The Final Tour (1996–1997), Hellblazer/The Books of Magic (1997–1998), The Trenchcoat Brigade (1999), The Books of Faerie: Molly's Story (1999). Reiber's Shadows Fall (with artist John Van Fleet) was a self-created horror story grounded in a reality which made the tale "all the more creepy than if the story was played out in the realm and scope of superheroes". Reiber's Tell Me Dark, produced for DC, was collected in softcover by Vertigo, and he also contributed to various anthologies.

J. M. DeMatteis began his comics career on DC's House of Mystery title over a decade before the formation of Vertigo, and later became one of the earliest Vertigo creators thanks in large part to his proposed Touchmark projects. DeMatteis' Mercy one-shot and miniseries The Last One both debuted in 1993, with reprints of two creator-owned Epic Comics projects following in subsequent years: his 1985-87 creator-owned maxiseries Moonshadow was reprinted between 1994 and 1995, with the miniseries Blood: A Tale seeing print again in 1996–7. DeMatteis also wrote fifteen issues of Seekers into the Mystery (1996–7) for Vertigo.

Mike Carey, having started his American comics career with Caliber Comics in the mid-1990s catapulted to prominence in March 1999 with the first issue of his Sandman spin-off miniseries Sandman Presents: Lucifer, which would lead to an ongoing series a year later and considerable praise and projects for Carey. A second Sandman miniseries, Sandman Presents: Petrefax (2000), soon followed, before the June 2000 debut of Lucifer. Neil Gaiman's preferred Sandman spin-off had not had an easy time being published, due to its title and main character, but Carey was able to helm it for a Sandman - equalling 75 issues (and a 2002 one-shot: Nirvana) for 6 years. During this time, Carey also wrote the hardcover OGN Sandman Presents: The Furies (2002), over 40 issues of Hellblazer between 2002 and 2006 and a 2005 Hellblazer original graphic novel, All His Engines. He also wrote a non-Sandman miniseries, My Faith in Frankie (2004), the comic book adaptation of Neil Gaiman's Neverwhere (2005–6) and the OGN God Save the Queen (2007). In 2007 he launched the ongoing series Crossing Midnight (2007–2008) and the miniseries Faker (2007–8).

Brian K. Vaughan's first Vertigo work was a short story in 2000's Winter's Edge #3 anthology, which led to him relaunching Swamp Thing (vol. 3) (2000–2001), which lasted for 20 issues. In September 2002, his (and Pia Guerra's) Y: The Last Man launched. It would ultimately run for 60 issues until March 2008. Vaughan also wrote the 2006 OGN Pride of Baghdad for Vertigo.

Ed Brubaker's first Vertigo work was on the "Vertigo Visions" Prez one-shot (1995), and intermittent contributions to a couple of anthology titles preceded his Scene of the Crime (1999), effectively laying the groundwork for his later crime comics. His next Vertigo project, the post-apocalyptic series Deadenders (2000–2001), ran for 16 issues while Brubaker wrote for both Batman and Detective Comics for parent-company DC. His 2001 miniseries Sandman Presents: The Dead Boy Detectives told the story of some incidental Sandman characters, and was later retold by Jill Thompson in manga form (2005). Brubaker subsequently took his Vertigo/crime sensibility to work from WildStorm, Icon and the mainstream DC and Marvel universes.

Bill Willingham came to Vertigo after a plethora of small press work in 1999 to launch his poker miniseries Proposition Player (1999–2000), and contribute to the Sandman universe with a one-shot spy-spoof, Sandman Presents: Merv Pumpkinhead, Agent of D.R.E.A.M. (2000), and a single issue contribution to The Dreaming ongoing series. A second Sandman one-shot, The Sandman Presents: Everything You Always Wanted to Know About Dreams... (2001), also led to a 4-issue miniseries, Sandman Presents: The Thessaliad (2002). Willingham's best-known work soon followed, with the July 2001 debut of Fables (with artist Lan Medina). In 2004, he returned to the world of the Sandman with Sandman Presents: Thessaly: Witch for Hire, and 2006 saw the debut of the Vertigo-esque magical—but mainstream DCU title—Shadowpact and Fables companion series Jack of Fables. In July 2008, with Fables nearing a major turning point in its run, Willingham relaunched House of Mystery as a Vertigo title with Lilah Sturges (then known as Matthew Sturges).

Other notable people who have written for Vertigo include Kyle Baker, Warren Ellis, David Lapham, Mark Millar, Brian Azzarello, Paul Pope, James Robinson, and Brian Wood.

=== Artists ===
Several artists have also produced a large amount of notable work for Vertigo, several (Steve Dillon, Pia Guerra, Eduardo Risso and Darick Robertson) mainly producing lengthy runs on individual creator-owned titles (in Guerra's case, Y: The Last Man makes up around 80% of her output to date), but others on a number of titles. Vertigo's main Universe titles, The Sandman, Hellblazer and Swamp Thing, have been particularly artistically diverse, and home to many talents, while the large number of creator-owned miniseries has seen large numbers of individuals producing work for Vertigo.

Peter Gross worked on a pre-Vertigo issue of Swamp Thing and an early Vertigo issue of Shade the Changing Man (#36, June 1993) before penciling & inking a story featuring Timothy Hunter in the "Children's Crusade" crossover Arcana Annual (Jan. 1994). This led to a regular inking role on the newly launched Books of Magic series, taking over as regular penciler and inker with #6; he would stay with the title for most of its run, writing as well as drawing its final 25 issues (1998–2000). Gross also inked Reiber's Mythos one-shot, and provided full artwork on the first Books of Faerie miniseries (1997) and pencils on the following year's The Books of Faerie: Auberon's Tale (1998). After Books of Magic, Gross moved to Lucifer (beginning with #5, Oct. 2000) and penciled 56 of the remaining issues, as well as inking a handful. He also co-penciled 2005's Constantine: The Official Movie Adaptation and several issues of Douglas Rushkoff's Testament from 2006 to 2007.

Dean Ormston has similarly produced a disproportionate amount of his artwork for Vertigo titles, including the lion's share of the alternate reality Books of Magick: Life During Wartime series (2004–5). His first Vertigo work was as one of several pencilers in the pages of Sandman #62 (Aug 1994), and in 1995 he penciled and inked Peter Milligan's The Eaters one-shot. His artwork appears in most (14) of the non-Peter Gross issues of Mike Carey's Lucifer, and he also handled art duties for Caitlin R. Kiernan's 4-issue The Girl Who Would be Death (1998–1999). In addition, he has worked on a number of single (and jam) issues of other Vertigo titles, including Crusades, House of Mystery, The Invisibles, Mythos, Sandman Mystery Theatre, Swamp Thing and Testament between 1994 and 2007.

Duncan Fegredo's first major American work was on the 1991 Kid Eternity miniseries with Grant Morrison. A 1992 cover for Doom Patrol similarly fell in Vertigo territory pre-Vertigo, while Fegredo's first "true" Vertigo work was also on the joint-first new series released by the imprint: Peter Milligan's Enigma. Immediately after the end of the eight-issue series, Fegredo took over as cover artist on Milligan's long-running Shade, the Changing Man (issues #42–50), collaborated with Milligan on 1995's one-shot Face (Jan) and then returned to cover duties on Shade, producing all but one of the remaining pieces of art. He produced pencils and inks for the miniseries Millennium Fever (1995) and (with Milligan) for Girl (1996). Between 1997 and 2002, he contributed artwork on fill-in issues (or to jam issues) of Crusades, The Dreaming, Flinch, House of Secrets, The Sandman Presents: Everything You Always Wanted to Know About Dreams..., Totems, Weird War Tales and Weird Western Tales. In addition, his cover work graced the 1999 miniseries Sandman Presents: Love Street, six issues of The Books of Magick: Life During Wartime and the first fifteen issues of Mike Carey's Lucifer.

Jill Thompson, although primarily known as an artist, has also produced scripts for Vertigo, producing as writer-artist three Sandman tie-ins: The Little Endless Storybook (2001) and two manga retellings of storylines: Death: At Death's Door (2003) and The Dead Boy Detectives (2005). Between 1993 and 1994, she penciled the first six issues of the ongoing Black Orchid series and the 4-issue miniseries Finals (1999). She has contributed ten issues each to the high-profile Vertigo series Sandman (penciling the complete "Brief Lives" storyline, part 7 of which was the first Vertigo issue) and The Invisibles, and penciled four of the last five issues of Seekers into the Mystery. She has produced fill-in issues of Books of Magic, The Dreaming and Swamp Thing and contributed artwork to the anthology comics Fables #59 (in addition to a story in the hardcover OGN 1001 Nights of Snowfall) and Transmetropolitan: Filth of the City.

Jon J Muth, a painter, has produced several lavish volumes for Vertigo, including writing, penciling, inking and coloring the 1998 one-shot Swamp Thing: Roots. Primarily, his Vertigo output has been in collaboration with J. M. DeMatteis, an issue of Blood: A Tale, the maxiseries Moonshadow (and its coda, Farewell, Moonshadow (1997)) and three issues of Seekers into the Mystery. Muth painted Grant Morrison's The Mystery Play (1994) and the 2002 Lucifer: Nirvana special for Mike Carey. His work also effectively ended Neil Gaiman's Sandman series, Muth painting issue #74, the final issue of The Wake storyline, and second-to-last main issue.

The artwork of Charles Vess has infrequently but notably accompanied the words of Neil Gaiman on Vertigo projects, including the 4-issue Stardust (1997–8) miniseries, later reprinted as an illustrated hardcover book. Vess' work can also be seen in the two Shakespeare adaptations in the pages of The Sandman, the first of which (pre-Vertigo) won the comic and duo the World Fantasy Award for Best Short Story, and the last of which was also the final (75th) issue of the series. Vess also contributed a story to the Fables OGN 1001 Nights of Snowfall, illustrated a Books of Magic cover and produced an issue of The Dreaming (2000).

Sean Phillips earliest American comics work was in the pages of pre-Vertigo Hellblazer, and in May 1993 he became one of the early Vertigo artists by illustrating (with assists from Paul Peart and Sean Harrison Scoffield) the entire 16-issue run of Kid Eternity (1993–4). He drew the covers for twenty-three of the twenty-five issues of the first The Invisibles series and also returned to Hellblazer (switching from artwork and covers to just covers after around 20 issues) between 1995 and 1998. He drew three issues of Shade, the Changing Man (1994), the one-shot Hell Eternal (1995) and the miniseries The Minx as well as inking most of Michael Lark's work on Scene of the Crime. He penciled four issues of the final Invisibles series between 1999 and 2000, produced covers for the Hellblazer Special: Bad Blood miniseries, and shared art chores with John Bolton on the 2001 miniseries User.

John Bolton, another frequent Gaiman collaborator has rarely worked with that author directly for Vertigo, but has utilised his characters, including in the OGN Sandman Presents: The Furies and the Books of Magic lead-in Arcana Annual. He also contributed to the Sandman Mystery Theatre annual, and the Fables OGN 1001 Nights of Snowfall. With Sean Phillips, he produced the artwork for Devin Grayson's 2001 miniseries User, and individually fully illustrated the OGN's Menz Insana (1997) and God Save the Queen (2007).

Other artists include Chris Bachalo, Mark Buckingham, Guy Davis, Phil Jimenez, Jock, Warren Pleece and Liam Sharp.

==== Cover artists ====
Dave McKean is the artist who provided all of the covers to the Vertigo's highest profile series The Sandman (1989–96). The first 46 of these covers were created for the DC imprint, but McKean's work also includes a number of Sandman spin-off issues, miniseries and galleries. These include the two Death miniseries and all 60 issues of The Dreaming (1996–2001). He provided the first 24 DC published covers to Hellblazer, and all 22 covers to the 1993-1995 Black Orchid Vertigo series (which spun off from his (and Gaiman's) 1988 DC miniseries). He produced the first cover for Sandman Mystery Theatre and his work was featured in a 1997 artbook incorporating his Sandman covers, "Dust Covers: The Collected Sandman Covers, 1989–1997".

In addition, McKean's artwork also graced the inside pages of the public service comic Death Talks about Life (1994), an issue of The Dreaming (#8), two issues of the DC-published Hellblazer (#27 with Gaiman and #40 with Delano) and his and Neil Gaiman's OGN Mr. Punch (1994). The duo's Black Orchid was similarly produced for DC, but was retroactively deemed a Vertigo title.

Brian Bolland and Glenn Fabry have also produced a large number of iconic covers for the Vertigo line, Fabry probably being best known for his work on one title: Garth Ennis and Steve Dillon's Preacher (and the spin-off miniseries). Bolland, one of the earliest British creators whose work was brought to America, drew the first 63 covers for Animal Man, mostly for DC, but also the first six Vertigo issues before handing over to a succession of other artists. Bolland also drew the cover for Vertigo's first Doom Patrol issue and for the entire second and third volumes of Morrison's Invisibles (1997–2000) (and in addition provided artwork for the TPB collections of Morrison's Doom Patrol run, and all volumes of The Invisibles). Bolland provided covers for three issues of Mark Millar's Swamp Thing run (1995), and miniseries including Vamps (1994–5), both Vertigo Tank Girl (1995–1996) miniseries and Blood & Water (2003) as well as the one-shot Zatanna: Everyday Magic (2003). Bolland also wrote and illustrated stories for the anthology titles Heartthrobs and Strange Adventures (1999) and OGN 1001 Nights of Snowfall, as well as providing a cover each for the Gangland and Winter's Edge anthologies. With issue #12, Bolland took over cover duties (from Fables cover artist James Jean) on Fables spin-off Jack of Fables, which he continues to produce as of June 2008. Fabry, in addition to his Preacher covers, provided covers for Ennis' miniseries Adventures in the Rifle Brigade: Operation Bollock (2001–2002) and most of that authors first run on Hellblazer (1992–94) - which included the first Vertigo issue - as well as his return to the title in 1998–1999. In addition, Fabry has also penciled a couple of short Hellblazer stories for various specials, and drew the covers for the Hellblazer: The Trenchcoat Brigade miniseries. He contributed to the multi-artist Transmetropolitan special "I Hate It Here" and provided three covers each to the ongoing Transmetropolitan (2002) and Swamp Thing (Vol. 3) (2001); covered the complete Scarab (1993–1994) miniseries, all 19 issues of Outlaw Nation and one issue each of the anthology titles Gangland, Heartthrobs and Weird War Tales. Between 2005 and 2006, Fabry fully illustrated Mike Carey's adaptation of Neil Gaiman's Neverwhere, having previously collaborated with the man himself on a story in the 2003 OGN The Sandman: Endless Nights. At the start of 2008, he provided a cover for an issue of Exterminators, before taking over from Lee Bermejo as on-going cover artist on, again, Hellblazer.

Other notable cover artists include Dan Brereton, Tim Bradstreet, Duncan Fegredo, James Jean, Dave Johnson and J. G. Jones.

== Adaptations in other media ==
=== Film ===
- Swamp Thing (1982), based on the comic book series by Len Wein and Bernie Wrightson, directed and written by Wes Craven.
- The Return of Swamp Thing (1989), based on the comic book series by Len Wein and Bernie Wrightson, directed by Jim Wynorski.
- Constantine (2005), based on the Hellblazer series of comics.
- A History of Violence (2005), based on the graphic novel of the same name by John Wagner and by Vince Locke, directed by David Cronenberg.
- V for Vendetta (2006), based on the comic series by Alan Moore and David Lloyd, and produced by the Wachowskis.
- Stardust (2007), based on the novel by Neil Gaiman and Charles Vess, directed by Matthew Vaughn.
- Watchmen (2009), based on the comic series by Alan Moore and Dave Gibbons, directed by Zack Snyder.
- The Losers (2010), based on the monthly series of the same name, created by Andy Diggle and Jock.
- The Kitchen (2019), based on the series, created by Ollie Masters and Ming Doyle.
- Watchmen (2024), based on the comic series by Alan Moore and Dave Gibbons.

=== TV ===
- Swamp Thing (1990), based on the comic book series by Len Wein and Bernie Wrightson for USA Network, plus an animated TV series of the same name in 1991 and a more horror-based live-action TV series of the same name in 2019 for DC Universe.
- Human Target (1992), based on the comic book series by Peter Milligan for ABC and another TV series of the same name in 2010 for FOX.
- Constantine (2014–2015), based on the comic book series Hellblazer by Alan Moore and developed by David Goyer and Daniel Cerone for NBC.
- iZombie (2015–2019), loosely based on the comic book series of the same name by Chris Roberson for The CW.
- Lucifer (2016–2021), loosely based on the Sandman character Lucifer by Neil Gaiman and Mike Carey for FOX (season 1–3) and Netflix (season 4–6).
- Preacher (2016–2019), based on the comic book series by Garth Ennis and developed by Seth Rogen for AMC.
- Doom Patrol (2019–2023), based on the comic book series by Arnold Drake, Bob Haney and Bruno Premiani for DC Universe (2019–2020) and HBO Max (2020–2023).
- Watchmen (2019), based on the comic book series by Alan Moore and Dave Gibbons for HBO.
- Sweet Tooth (2021–2024), based on the comic book series by Jeff Lemire for Netflix.
- Y: The Last Man (2021), based on comic book series by Brian K. Vaughan and Pia Guerra for FX on Hulu.
- DMZ (2022), based on the comic book series by Brian Wood and Riccardo Burchielli for HBO Max.
- The Sandman (2022–2025), based on the comic book series by Neil Gaiman for Netflix.
- Bodies (2023), based on the comic book series by Si Spencer, and developed by Paul Tomalin for Netflix.
- Dead Boy Detectives (2024), based on the characters created by Neil Gaiman for Netflix.
- Get Jiro (2026), based on the comic book series by Anthony Bourdain and Joel Rose for Adult Swim.

=== Video games ===
- 100 Bullets was optioned and partly developed as a game, but was canceled in 2004. The license has been bought and an unconnected game was in development as of 2007, but was again canceled several years later.
- Constantine, a spin-off based on the film of the same name.
- The Wolf Among Us is an episodic graphic adventure video game, a prequel to Bill Willingham's Fables comic book series.

== Logo ==
1993–2018 logo

2018–2020 logo

2024–present logo

== See also ==
- List of Vertigo Comics publications
- Adult comics
