= 2020 Visions =

Comic book by Jamie Delano (1997–1998)

- Cover of 2020 Visions #1

Publication information
- Publisher: Vertigo
- Schedule: Monthly
- Format: Limited series
- Publication date: May 1997 – April 1998
- No. of issues: 12

Creative team
- Created by: Jamie Delano
- Written by: Jamie Delano
- Artist(s): Frank Quitely; Warren Pleece; James Romberger; Steve Pugh
- Letterer: Ellie de Ville
- Colorist: James Sinclair
- Editor(s): Karen Berger; Axel Alonso

Collected editions
- Hardcover: ISBN 978-0974271347
- Trade paperback: ISBN 978-0973703993
- 2019 trade: ISBN 978-1939888785

2020 Visions (sometimes called 20/20 Visions) is a science fiction comic book written by Jamie Delano and drawn by four artists. Originally serialized as a twelve-issue full-color limited series from 1997 to 1998 at the Vertigo imprint of DC Comics, it was later collected in black-and-white in a 2004 hardcover by Cyberosia Publishing and a 2005 trade paperback by Speakeasy Comics. A new edition of the trade paperback was released in color in 2019 by ComicMix.

== Overview ==
The series consists of four different stories told over three issue arcs, each having its own artist, and each blending a different genre with prospective science-fiction:

1. "Lust For Life" - horror-like (art by Frank Quitely, covers by John Eder)
2. "La Tormenta" - crime-like (art by Warren Pleece, covers by John Eder)
3. "Renegade" - western-like (art by James Romberger, covers by Stephen John Phillips)
4. "Repro Man" - romance-like (art by Steve Pugh, covers by Stephen John Phillips)

With all stories taking place in the year 2020, they are all loosely connected by a genetic relationship between the main protagonist of each tale.

== Collected editions ==
The collected editions include an introduction by Richard Kadrey:

Title	Material collected	Format	Publication date	ISBN	Publisher
2020 Visions	2020 Visions #1–12	Hardcover	2004	978-0974271347	Cyberosia Publishing
2020 Visions	2020 Visions #1–12	Trade paperback	September 2005	978-0973703993	Speakeasy Comics
2020 Visions	2020 Visions #1–12	Trade paperback	December 2019	978-1939888785	ComicMix

== Reception ==
Publishers Weekly commented that "the William Burroughs-influenced squalor and grotesquerie that Delano indulges in constantly have no real payoff" and described the art for the final two arcs as "ugly and frequently unclear". While admiring Delano's "plenty of clever ideas [...] unfortunately, it all doesn't hold together as a single book".
