= Second Coming (comic book series) =

Comic book series

Second Coming is a religious satire comic book series written and illustrated by Mark Russell and Richard Pace. The series was originally going to be published by Vertigo Comics, an imprint of DC Comics, but after criticism from conservative and Christian news outlets as well as a petition the series was canceled and the rights were returned to Russell. The series was later published in March 2020 by Ahoy Comics and was followed by two sequels titled Second Coming: Only Begotten Son and Second Coming: Trinity.

== Background ==
The series is written by Mark Russell, with art by Richard Pace and Leonard Kirk, colors by Andy Troy, and covers by Amanda Conner and Richard Pace. The comic book series was first announced in July 2018 at San Diego Comic-Con, but in January news outlets such as the Christian Broadcasting Network, Christian Headlines, and Fox News began criticizing the series. The series was originally going to be published on March 6, 2019, but in February Russell and Pace announced that the series had been canceled. DC Comics was going to include it in the relaunch of its imprint Vertigo Comics, but after the online petition criticizing the series, DC Comics decided to cancel it. DC Comics had requested that profanity and nudity be removed from the series leading up to its cancellation, but Russell and Pace weren't comfortable with the requested changes. DC Comics decided to cancel issue #88 of Swamp Thing in 1989 for similar reasons.

After the series was cancelled Russell asked DC Comics to have the rights to the story and they gave it to him. The comic book was later picked up by Ahoy Comics in July 2019 and the first issue was published in March 2020. Russell has previously published books that were similarly focused on Christianity such as God is Disappointed in You and Apocrypha Now. Russell and Pace both cited Monty Python's Life of Brian as their favorite example of religious satire. The series was originally intended to be composed of six issues, but Russell planned to write as many as 18.

Russell intended to portray Jesus in a subversive manner in the series. The second series was titled Second Coming: Only Begotten Son. The second series was written by Mark Russell, drawn by Richard Pace and Leonard Kirk, colored by Richard Pace and Andy Troy, lettered by Rob Steen, and cover art by Richard Pace. The third series was titled Second Coming: Trinity. The third series was written by Mark Russell, art by Richard Pace and Leonard Kirk, and cover art by Richard Pace and Tom Fowler.
