= Animal Man (comic book) =

Ongoing series published by DC Comics

- Cover to Animal Man (volume 1) #1 by Brian Bolland.

Publication information
- Publisher: DC Comics; Vertigo
- Schedule: Monthly
- Format: Ongoing series
- Genre: Superhero horror
- Publication date: (vol. 1); September 1988 – November 1995 (vol. 2); September 2011 – March 2014
- No. of issues: (vol. 1): 89 and 1 Annual (vol. 2): 30 (#1–29 plus issue numbered 0) and 2 Annuals
- Main character: Animal Man

Creative team
- Created by: Grant Morrison; Chas Truog

Animal Man is a superhero horror comic book series published by DC Comics starring the superhero Animal Man. The series is best known for the run by writer Grant Morrison from issue #1 to #26 with penciller Chas Truog, who stayed on the series until #32.

Animal Man was innovative in its advocacy and for its use of themes including social consciousness (with a focus on animal rights), metaphysics, deconstruction of the superhero genre and comic book form, postmodernism, eccentric plot twists, explorations of cosmic spirituality and mysticism, the determination of apparent free will by a higher power, and manipulation of reality including quantum physics, unified field theory, time travel and metafictional technique. The series is well-known for its frequently psychedelic and "off-the-wall" content.

A majority of the series' cover art was done by Brian Bolland, often portraying intentionally unusual or shocking imagery with no text blurbs.

Grant Morrison would return to the character Animal Man in 52.

== Publication history ==
Although the series was initially conceived as a four-issue limited series, it was upgraded into an ongoing series following strong sales.

The series was released in DC's high-quality New Format, and was published without the Comics Code Authority seal of approval. When DC launched its Vertigo imprint in 1993, Animal Man was moved to the imprint beginning with issue #57.

=== Grant Morrison's run (1988–1990) ===
Grant Morrison developed several long-running plots, introducing mysteries, some of which were not explained until a year or two later. The title featured the protagonist both in and—increasingly—out of costume. Morrison made the title character an everyman figure living in a universe populated by superheroes, aliens, and fantastic technology. Buddy's wife Ellen, his son Cliff (9 years old at the beginning of the series), and his daughter Maxine (5 years old) featured prominently in most storylines, and his relationship with them as husband and father was an ongoing theme.

The series championed vegetarianism and animal rights, causes Morrison supported. In one issue, Buddy helps a band of self-confessed eco-terrorists save a pod of dolphins. Enraged at a fisherman's brutality, Buddy drops him into the ocean, intending for him to drown. The man is saved by a dolphin.

Buddy fought several menaces, such as an ancient, murderous spirit that was hunting him; brutal, murderous alien Thanagarian warriors; and even the easily defeated red robots of an elderly villain who was tired of life. The series made deep, sometimes esoteric, reference to the entire DC canon, including B'wana Beast, Mirror Master, and Arkham Asylum.

=== Post-Morrison (1990–1993) ===
Following Morrison's run, Peter Milligan wrote a 6-issue story (#27–32) featuring several surreal villains and heroes, exploring questions about identity and quantum physics and utilizing the textual cut-up technique popularized by William S. Burroughs.

Tom Veitch and Steve Dillon then took over for 18 issues (#33–50) in which Buddy returns to his work as a movie stuntman and explores mystical totemic aspects of his powers.

Jamie Delano wrote 29 issues (#51–79) with Steve Pugh as artist, giving the series a more horror-influenced feel with a "suggested for mature readers" label on the cover.

=== Vertigo (1993–1995) ===
After Jamie Delano's first six issues, wherein, among other things, he killed off the central character of Buddy Baker, created the "Red" and resurrected Buddy as an "animal avatar" (analogous to the "Green" of Swamp Thing), the series became one of the charter titles of DC's new mature readers Vertigo imprint with #57, and its ties to the DC Universe became more tenuous. Vertigo was establishing itself as a distinct "mini-universe" with its own continuity, only occasionally interacting with the continuity of the regular DC Universe. The title evolved into a more horror-themed book, with Buddy eventually shapeshifting into a non-human animal god. The superhero elements of the book were largely removed — since Buddy was reborn as a kind of animal elemental, and legally deceased, he discarded his costume, stopped associating with other heroes, and generally abandoned his crime-fighting role. He co-founded the Life Power Church of Maxine to further an environmentalist message, drifting along U.S. Route 66 to settle in Montana. Delano's final issue was #79, culminating in Buddy dying several more times.

Between issues #66 and #67, Delano also penned the Animal Man Annual #1, focusing on Buddy's daughter Maxine. It was the third part of Vertigo's attempt to create a crossover event titled "The Children's Crusade". This event ran across the Annuals of the five then-Vertigo titles – Animal Man, Swamp Thing, Black Orchid, The Books of Magic and Doom Patrol – book-ended by two Children's Crusade issues co-written by Neil Gaiman, and starring his Dead Boy Detectives.

A brief run by Jerry Prosser and Fred Harper (#80–89) featured a re-reborn Buddy as a white-haired shamanistic figure before the series was canceled after the 89th issue due to declining sales.

=== Return to DC (2011–2014) ===
In July 2009, DC Comics released a six-issue limited series The Last Days of Animal Man by Gerry Conway and Chris Batista. The series takes place in the year 2024 and addresses a Buddy Baker who is losing both his family and his powers.

In September 2011, The New 52 rebooted DC's continuity, which included merging the Vertigo universe into DC's. In this new timeline, Animal Man is re-established for DC by the creative team of writer Jeff Lemire and artists Travel Foreman and Dan Green. The series follows Buddy and his family as his daughter Maxine begins to display powers of necromancy-based animal control. Buddy is then forced to go on a journey to discover the source of this power and his own. He finds it in a life force known as the "Red", the animal counterpart to the "Green" from Swamp Thing. Much like the Green, there have been multiple creatures chosen to represent the Red over the years; a few became evil and became part of what is known as the "Rot". This led into a crossover between Swamp Thing and Animal Man titled "Rotworld".

== "Nature of reality" as a theme ==
Breaking the fourth wall; cover to Animal Man #19, art by Brian Bolland.

During their run on the title, Morrison consistently manipulated and deconstructed the fourth wall — the imaginary barrier separating the reader from the setting of the story which also extends to the characters and their creators. One visual expression of this theme was to present characters in a state of partial erasure — often juxtaposing the artist's pencil drafts with the finished art. Additionally, some characters become aware that they are being viewed by a vast audience, and are able to interact with the borders of the panels on the page. The series notably contained overt references to the various Earths of the pre-Crisis DC Multiverse.

Issue #5, "The Coyote Gospel", features Crafty, a thinly disguised version of Wile E. Coyote. Weary of the endless cycle of violence which he and his cartoon compatriots are subject to, Crafty appeals to his cartoonist creator. A bargain is struck: he can end the violence only by willingly being condemned to leave his cartoon world, entering Animal Man's "comic" world instead. The issue concludes with a series of "pull-back" shots beginning with a close-up of Crafty's bleeding body (and white blood), culminating with a panel depicting the cartoonist's immense hand, coloring Crafty's blood with red paint. The issue is partly a religious allegory and partly a juxtaposition of the various layers of reality: cartoon to comic book, comic book to real life. It was nominated for an Eisner Award for Best Single Issue.

The culmination of this self-referentiality is Animal Man's eventual discovery that all of the inhabitants of the DC Universe are fictional characters. He even meets Grant Morrison, the callous "god" who controls his life.

Buddy suffers a tragedy when his wife and children are brutally murdered while he is away on a case. Buddy tracks down the killers to exact vengeance. His search leads him into a comic book Limbo, a plane of residence for characters who are not actively written about. Animal Man ultimately confronts his writer in issue #26, and his family is restored to life, as Morrison cannot justify keeping them dead simply for the sake of "realism".

Morrison also explains to Buddy that they write him as a vegetarian only because they are a vegetarian too, and every trait Baker possesses could be changed at a whim. Morrison said: "They might do the obvious and go for shock by turning you into a meat-eater". In issue #27, the first of Peter Milligan's run, Buddy indeed bites into a horse.

== Awards ==
Brian Bolland won the Eisner Award for Best Cover Artist in 1992 for his work on Animal Man. The series also earned several nominations in 1989, for Best Single Issue (#5), Best Writer (Grant Morrison), and Best Series.

== Collected editions ==
=== Volume 1 ===
Collected editions of Animal Man, volume 1
Title	Material collected	Publication date	ISBN
Animal Man Vol. 1: Animal Man	Animal Man (vol. 1) #1–9	July 1991	978-1563890055
Animal Man Vol. 2: Origin of the Species	Animal Man (vol. 1) #10–17, Secret Origins #39	July 1, 2002	978-1563898907
Animal Man Vol. 3: Deus Ex Machina	Animal Man (vol. 1) #18–26	November 1, 2003	978-1563899683
Animal Man by Grant Morrison 30th Anniversary Deluxe Edition Book One	Animal Man (vol. 1) #1–13, Secret Origins #39	December 12, 2018	978-1401285470
Animal Man by Grant Morrison 30th Anniversary Deluxe Edition Book Two	Animal Man (vol. 1) #14-26	September 2020	978-1779505507
The Animal Man Omnibus	Animal Man (vol. 1) #1–26, Secret Origins #39	August 6, 2013	978-1401238995
Animal Man by Grant Morrison and Chas Truog Compendium	Animal Man (vol. 1) #1–26, Secret Origins #39	Oct 1, 2024	978-1779527790
Animal Man Vol. 4: Born to be Wild	Animal Man (vol. 1) #27–37	February 26, 2013	978-1401238018
Animal Man Vol. 5: The Meaning of Flesh	Animal Man (vol. 1) #38–50	January 28, 2014	978-1401242848
Animal Man by Tom Veitch and Steve Dillon Omnibus	Animal Man (vol. 1) #27–50; War of the Gods #3; Suicide Squad #58	April 21, 2026	978-1799507901
Animal Man Vol. 6: Flesh and Blood	Animal Man (vol. 1) #51–63	July 15, 2014	978-1401246792
Animal Man Vol. 7: Red Plague	Animal Man (vol. 1) #64–79, Annual #1	January 20, 2015	978-1401251239

=== Volume 2 ===
Collected editions of Animal Man, volume 2
Title	Material collected	Publication date	ISBN
Animal Man Vol. 1: The Hunt	Animal Man (vol. 2) #1–6	May 8, 2012	978-1401235079
Animal Man Vol. 2: Animal vs. Man	Animal Man (vol. 2) #0, 7–11, Annual #1	January 15, 2013	978-1401238001
Animal Man Vol. 3: Rotworld: The Red Kingdom	Animal Man (vol. 2) #12–19 and Swamp Thing (vol. 5) #12, 17	September 10, 2013	978-1401242626
Animal Man Vol. 4: Splinter Species	Animal Man (vol. 2) #20–23, Annual #2	March 11, 2014	978-1401246440
Animal Man Vol. 5: Evolve or Die	Animal Man (vol. 2) #24–29	November 11, 2014	978-1401249946
Animal Man by Jeff Lemire Omnibus	Animal Man (vol. 2) #0–29, Annual #1–2 and Swamp Thing (vol. 5) #12,17	December 10, 2019	978-1401289416

=== Miniseries ===
Collected editions of The Last Days of Animal Man
Title	Material collected	Publication date	ISBN
The Last Days of Animal Man	The Last Days of Animal Man #1–6	March 9, 2010	978-1401226404
