= Ahoy Comics =

US comic book publisher

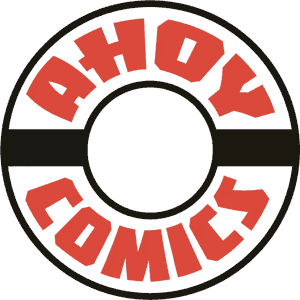
- Status: Active
- Founded: 2018
- Country of origin: United States
- Headquarters location: Syracuse, New York
- Distribution: Diamond Comic Distributors (comics); Simon & Schuster (books)
- Key people: Hart Seely, Tom Peyer, Stuart Moore, Frank Cammuso
- Publication types: Comic books, graphic novels
- Official website: www.comicsahoy.com

Ahoy Comics is an American comic book publisher. It was founded in 2018 by publisher Hart Seely, editors Tom Peyer and Stuart Moore, and chief creative officer Frank Cammuso. At its launch, Ahoy sought to distinguish itself from other comics publishers by including additional "backup material" in each periodical issue, such as prose and poetry features.

== History ==
Ahoy launched in 2018 with limited series The Wrong Earth by Tom Peyer and Jamal Igle, High Heaven by Peyer and Greg Scott, and Captain Ginger by Stuart Moore and June Brigman; and the anthology Edgar Allan Poe's Snifter of Terror. The following year it launched Bronze Age Boogie by Moore and Alberto Ponticelli; Planet of the Nerds by Paul Constant, Alan Robinson, and Randy Elliott; Hashtag: Danger by Peyer and Chris Giarrusso; and the one-shot anthology Steel Cage.

Following DC Comics' decision not to publish the announced limited series Second Coming by Mark Russell and Richard Pace due to creative differences over the controversial subject matter – featuring Jesus Christ in the context of a superhero universe – the series was later published by Ahoy.

== Comic books ==
Comic books
Title	Issues	Publication date	Writer	Artist	Ref.
Wave 1
The Wrong Earth	#1–6	September 2018 – February 2019	Tom Peyer	Jamal Igle	
High Heaven	#1–5	September 2018 – January 2019	Tom Peyer	Greg Scott	
Captain Ginger	#1–4	October 2018 – January 2019	Stuart Moore	June Brigman & Roy Richardson	
Edgar Allan Poe's Snifter of Terror	#1–6	October 2018 – March 2019	Various	Various	
Wave 2
Bronze Age Boogie	#1–6	April 2019 – September 2019	Stuart Moore	Alberto Ponticelli	
Planet of the Nerds	#1–5	April 2019 – August 2019	Paul Constant	Alan Robinson	
Hashtag Danger	#1–5	May 2019 – September 2019	Tom Peyer	Fred Harper	
Steel Cage	#1	June 2019	Mark Waid, Tom Peyer, Stuart Moore	Lanna Souvanny, Alan Robinson, Peter Gross	
Second Coming	#1–6	July 2019 – January 2020	Mark Russell	Richard Pace & Leonard Kirk	
Wave 3
Edgar Allan Poe's Snifter of Terror: Season Two	#1–6	October 2019 – March 2020	Various	Various	
Dragonfly & Dragonflyman	#1–5	November 2019 – March 2020	Tom Peyer	Peter Krause	
Captain Ginger: Dogworld	#1–6	February 2020 – September 2020	Stuart Moore	June Brigman & Roy Richardson	
Wave 4
Billionaire Island	#1–6	March 2020 – September 2020	Mark Russell	Steve Pugh	
Ash & Thorn	#1–5	June 2020 – September 2020	Mariah McCourt	Soo Lee	
Wave 5
Penultiman	#1–5	October 2020 – February 2021	Tom Peyer	Alan Robinson	
Edgar Allan Poe's Snifter of Blood	#1–6	October 2020 – March 2021	Various	Various	
Happy Hour	#1–6	November 2020 – April 2021	Peter Milligan	Michael Montenat	
Second Coming: Only Begotten Son	#1–6	December 2020 – October 2021	Mark Russell	Richard Pace & Leonard Kirk	
The Wrong Earth: Night & Day	#1–6	January 2021 – August 2021	Tom Peyer	Jamal Igle	
Wave 6
Blacks' Myth	#1–5	July 2021 – November 2021	Eric Palicki	Wendell Cavalcanti	
Edgar Allan Poe's Snifter of Death	#1–6	September 2021 – March 2022	Various	Various	
My Bad	#1–5	November 2021 – March 2022	Mark Russell	Peter Krause	
Snelson	#1–5	August 2021 – December 2021	Paul Constant	Fred Harper	
Wave 7
The Wrong Earth: Trapped on Teen Planet	#1	March 2022	Gail Simone	Bill Morrison	
The Wrong Earth: Fame & Fortune	#1	April 2022	Mark Russell	Michael Montenat	
The Wrong Earth: Purple	#1	May 2022	Stuart Moore	Fred Harper	
The Wrong Earth: Confidence Men	#1	June 2022	Mark Waid	Leonard Kirk	
The Wrong Earth: Meat	#1	July 2022	Tom Peyer	Greg Scott	
G.I.L.T.	#1–	April 2022 –	Alisa Kwitney	Mauricet	
Justice Warriors	#1–6	June 2022 – November 2022	Matt Bors	Ben Clarkson	
Highball	#1–	September 2022 –	Stuart Moore	Fred Harper	
My Bad: Volume Two	#1–	November 2022 –	Various	Various	
Billionaire Island: Cult of Dogs	#1–	November 2022 –	Mark Russell	Steve Pugh	
