= Deadenders =

Comic

- Deadenders #1 (March 2000) by Philip Bond

Publication information
- Publisher: DC Comics
- Schedule: Monthly
- Format: Ongoing series
- Genre: Post-apocalyptic
- Publication date: March 2000 – June 2001
- No. of issues: 16

Creative team
- Created by: Ed Brubaker & Warren Pleece
- Written by: Ed Brubaker
- Artist: Philip Bond (covers)
- Penciller: Warren Pleece
- Inker(s): Richard Case; Cameron Stewart
- Colorist(s): Bjarne Hansen; Marguerite Van Cook

Collected editions
- Stealing the Sun: ISBN 1-56389-706-7

Deadenders is a science fiction comic book series written by Ed Brubaker and published by DC Comics. It is set in a post-apocalyptic future in New Bethleham USA and features a heavy Mod content among the characters. The cover work is by Philip Bond. The series lasted for 16 issues.

== Plot ==
After what is colloquially called "The Cataclysm", a city called New Bethleham is segregated between its center sector, where something approaching normal life is maintained by the use of artificial sunlight, and its oppressive and crime-ridden suburbs and outlying districts, which are home to a new religion called "Doomsterism". Self-centered teenager Bartholomew "Beezer" Beezenbach begins experiencing otherworldly visions of a place that is definitely not New Bethleham. Through a bookseller friend, Beezer is put in touch with Anna Pierce, a wealthy girl from the city's center who has similar visions. The two of them convince Dr. Horatio Gago of the diabolical Science Corp to explain the visions to them. He claims that young people who experience these visions are being psychically yoked to a machine that maintains a small piece of the Cataclysm, which was originally created by a time travel experiment gone wrong. Anna and Beezer encounter a resistance group ready to storm the walls of Science Corp, and they follow, ultimately freeing the piece of Cataclysm and ending its baleful effects on their world.

== Collected editions ==
The first four issues have been released as a trade paperback under the title Deadenders: Stealing the Sun (ISBN 1-56389-706-7).

The complete series has been released as a trade paperback under the title Deadenders (ISBN 978-1-4012-3480-5).
