= Philip Bond =

British comic book artist

- Born: Philip John Bond; 1966 (age 59–60) Lancashire, England
- Areas: Penciller, Inker
- Notable works: Kill Your Boyfriend; Vimanarama
- Spouse: Shelly Bond (m. 2000)

Philip John Bond (born 11 July 1966) is a British comic book artist, who first came to prominence in the late 1980s on Deadline magazine, and later through a number of collaborations with British writers for the DC Comics imprint Vertigo.

== Biography ==
=== Early life, career and Deadline ===
Bond was born in Lancashire, England in 1966, and is the son of a preacher. His earliest comics work came out of his being "active in the British alternative comics scene from 1987," and he writes on his website that, in 1988:

"I was sat on the floor of Jamie Hewlett and Alan Martin's single room flat pasting up the first issue of our self-published ATOMTAN magazine."

Atomtan, Bond's first work, was a self-published fanzine created with Tank Girl creators Alan Martin and Jamie Hewlett, along with Luke Whitney and Jane Oliver. Bond's talent for comical, exaggerated anatomy and poses quickly led to professional work, mostly for now-defunct title Deadline, on strips such as Wired World.

This in turn led to Bond's inclusion in Atomeka Press star-studded anthology A1, with Bond contributing to issues No. 2 (with Hewlett) and No. 3 (in a story written and illustrated by Bond entitled "Endless Summer").

=== 2000 AD and Vertigo ===
In 1990, he illustrated (and co-created) the Garth Ennis-scripted comedy series Time Flies for the leading British science-fiction comic, 2000 AD. In 1995, Bond was involved in the hype surrounding the release of the Tank Girl movie, illustrating a number of new Tank Girl strips for various publications. With Tank Girl and American reprints of Deadline raising his US popularity, and the DC Comics imprint Vertigo actively recruiting UK talent, Bond's skills were soon at work on American comics. Bond inked a Pre-Vertigo issue of Doom Patrol before co-penciling (with Glyn Dillon and Chris Bachalo) two issues of Shade, the Changing Man and then penciling and inking an issue himself (issue No. 48, June 1994). In 1995, Vertigo released a number of one shot issues under the collective title "Vertigo Voices," written by Vertigo's "most outspoken writers." Bond illustrated (with additional inks by D'Israeli) Grant Morrison's offering: Kill Your Boyfriend.

Between November 1995 and January 1996, Bond inked Alan Grant's take on Tank Girl in Vertigo's Tank Girl: Apocalypse and worked on several issues of Morrison's The Invisibles in 1999/2000. In 2000 he illustrated Jamie Delano's Hellblazer miniseries Bad Blood, and provided covers to the Ed Brubaker and Warren Pleece series Deadenders (2000–01). He produced a handful of other miniseries and issues of various titles during the early 00s, including one of Morrison's most recent miniseries Vimanarama (2005). Bond says he was originally going to work on We3, but Morrison – with whom Bond has "an understanding because we both like what one another does" – "had this other idea that he thought I would be great for," leading to Bond illustrating Vimanarama, and Frank Quitely drawing We3.

=== Other work ===
Over his career Bond has also illustrated comic strips for bands including the Smashing Pumpkins and Sum 41, as well as T-shirts for bands such as Cud.

Most recently, Bond has focused his output on providing covers, rather than internal artwork. He has produced all covers (to date) for Simon Oliver and Tony Moore's The Exterminators, as well as a cover for Harvey Pekar's most recent American Splendor miniseries (all for Vertigo).

Bond has also worked at another DC Comics imprint, Wildstorm on Red Herring with David Tischman.

=== Personal life ===
Around 1999/2000, Bond "got attached and then married to Shelly Roeberg, who is now Shelly Bond." Roeberg, a key editor of DC Comics' Vertigo imprint titles, "had been coming over to the UK because she was the British liaison for Vertigo" after Karen Berger. Attending UK conventions, "when she came over in 1999 [she and Bond] really hit it off." Bond soon moved from the UK to New York City, and in 2004 the two had a son, Spencer.

He lives with his wife and son in New Jersey.

== Bibliography ==
=== British comics ===
- Atomtan (self-published) – 2 issues (1987–88)
- Wired World (Deadline) – 34 issues (1988–93)
- Hot Triggers (Deadline) – 13 issues (1989–93)

- plus numerous other short and one-off strips within the title.

- The Crooked Mile (Crisis, 10 issues, 1989)
- Circular Field (Deadline, 3 issues, 1989–90)
- Time Flies (with Garth Ennis):
  - "Time Flies" (in 2000 AD #700–711, 1990)
  - "Tempus Fugitive" (in 2000 AD #1015–1023, 1996)
- Tank Girl (8 issues, 1995)

=== American comics ===
Pencils and inks, unless otherwise stated:

- Doom Patrol No. 52 (inks, written by Grant Morrison, with pencils by Richard Case, Vertigo, 1992)
- Shade, the Changing Man No. 40, #43, No. 48 (written by Peter Milligan, Vertigo, 1992–1993)
  - Pencils with Glyn Dillon; Inks by Glyn Dillon for No. 40
  - Pencils with Chris Bachalo; Inks with Rick J Bryant for No. 43
- Kill Your Boyfriend (written by Grant Morrison, co-inked by D'Israeli, Vertigo, 1995)
- Kill You Boyfriend (reprint, 1998)
- "And We're All Police Men" (written by Grant Morrison, in Vertigo: Winter's Edge #1, Vertigo, 1998)
- "A Temporary Life" (written by Charlie Boatner, in Flinch No. 16, Vertigo, 1999)
- The Invisibles Vol. 3, No. 12, #11, No. 10, #9 and 3 pages of No. 4 (written by Grant Morrison, Vertigo, 1999–2000)
  - Pencils for #11-9 by Warren Pleece.
- Hellblazer Special: Bad Blood (written by Jamie Delano, 4-issue mini-series, Vertigo, 2000)
- Angel and the Ape #1–4 (written by Howard Chaykin and David Tischman, Vertigo, 2001)
- X-Statix No. 10, #12 (written by Peter Milligan, Marvel Comics, 2003)
  - Pencils by Mike Allred for No. 12.
- Vertical (inks, written by Steven T. Seagle, with pencils by Mike Allred, Vertigo, 2003)
- Vertigo Pop! London (written by Peter Milligan, Vertigo, 2003)
- Vimanarama (written by Grant Morrison, 3-issue mini-series, Vertigo, 2005)
- Red Herring (written by David Tischman, 6-issue limited series, Wildstorm, October 2009 – March 2010, tpb, August 2010, 144 pages, ISBN 1-4012-2762-7)
- Prelude to Deadpool Corps No. 3 (written by Victor Gischler, 5-issue limited series, Marvel Comics, May 2010, 120 pages, premiere hardcover, July 2010, ISBN 0-7851-4752-7)
- "Canada, Man!" (with Rob Williams, in Deadpool #1000, Marvel Comics, October 2010)
- "Eve Stranger" written by David Barnett, Black Crown 2019

==== Covers only ====
- Vertigo: Winter's Edge #3 – 1998
- Heartthrobs #3 (By Various) – 1999
- Deadenders #1–16 (By Ed Brubaker and Warren Pleece) – 2000–01
- Fallen Angel No. 14 (By Peter David and David Lopez) – 2004
- The Exterminators #1-(#29) (By Simon Oliver and Tony Moore) – 2006–ON-GOING
- American Splendor No. 1 (By Harvey Pekar et al.) – 2008

=== Others ===
- Frequent spot illustrator for the Fortean Times
- Sustained collaboration with the band Alisha's Attic, 1996–97
- Kirin Beer adverts (Team Saatchi) – 2002
