= Jamie Delano =

British comics writer (born 1954)

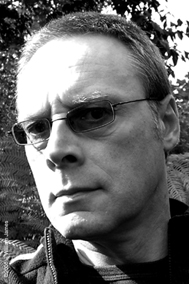
- Born: 1954 (age 71–72) Northampton, England
- Area: Writer
- Notable works: Captain Britain; Hellblazer

Jamie Delano (/ˈdɛlənoʊ/ DEL-ə-noh; born 1954) is an English comic book writer. He was part of the first post-Alan Moore "British Invasion" of writers which started to feature in American comics in the 1980s. He is best known as the first writer of the comic book series Hellblazer, featuring John Constantine.

== Biography ==
Jamie Delano wrote all but four of the first forty issues of Hellblazer for DC Comics from 1988 to 1991. Most of his other work has also been for DC/Vertigo.

Much of Delano's work can be characterised as science fiction, or horror, but often is a blend thereof.

Subjects in his work include the battle of the sexes (World Without End), imperialism and genocide (Ghostdancing), and environmental and cultural collapse (2020 Visions, Animal Man).

A. William James is Delano's prose-writing alter ego. His novel Book Thirteen is published under his Lepus Books imprint.

== Bibliography ==
Comics work includes:

- Transformers Annual 1986
  - Text Story The Mission
- Night Raven:
  - Various prose (with illustrations by Alan Davis and Ivan Allen in "The Daredevils 11" "Mighty World of Marvel 7-17" "Savage Sword of Conan 85-92" and "Captain Britain 10, 11 and 12" Marvel UK 1983–1984)
  - "House of Cards" (with David Lloyd, Marvel UK, one shot, 1993)
- Captain Britain (with Alan Davis and Noel Davis), in Captain Britain Monthly #1-3,5-12, Marvel UK, 1984, tpb, 1988, ISBN 1-85400-020-9)
- One-Off:
  - "Blood Sport" (with David Pugh, in 2000 AD No. 484, 1986)
  - "The Ark" (with Dave Wyatt, in 2000 AD No. 504, 1987)
- Tharg's Future Shocks:
  - "The Ship that Liked to Dance" (with Barry Kitson, in 2000 AD No. 501, 1986)
  - "Fair's Fare" (with Massimo Belardinelli, in 2000 AD No. 530, 1987)
- Doctor Who (with John Ridgway, collected in The World Shapers, Panini Comics, 288 pages, May 2008, ISBN 1-905239-87-4):
  - "Time Bomb" (in Doctor Who Magazine #114–116, 1986)
  - "The Gift" (with inks by Tim Perkins, in Doctor Who Magazine #123–126, 1987)
- D.R. and Quinch: "DR & Quinch's Agony Page" (with co-author and pencils Alan Davis and inks and colours by Mark Farmer, in 2000 AD #525–534, 1987)
- Hellblazer:
  - Hellblazer #1–24, 28–31, 33–40, 84, 250, Annual 1 (with John Ridgway, Richard Piers Rayner, Mark Buckingham, Bryan Talbot, Steve Pugh, Sean Phillips, & others, Vertigo/DC, 1988–2008) collected as:
    - Original Sins (collects #1–9, Vertigo, October 1998, ISBN 1-56389-052-6, Titan Books, February 2007, ISBN 1-84576-465-X)
    - The Devil You Know (collects #10–13, The Hellblazer Annual and The Horrorist #1–2, Vertigo, May 2007, ISBN 1-4012-1269-7, Titan Books, July 2007, ISBN 1-84576-490-0)
    - Rare Cuts (collects No. 11, 25–26 and 35, Vertigo, February 2005, ISBN 1-4012-0240-3, Titan Books, January 2005, ISBN 1-84023-974-3)
    - Fear Machine (collects #14–22, 208 pages, Vertigo, June 2008, ISBN 1-4012-1810-5, Titan Books, ISBN 1-84576-880-9)
    - Family Man (collects #23–24 and 28–33, 208 pages, November 2008, Titan Books, ISBN 1-84576-978-3, Vertigo, ISBN 1-4012-1964-0)
  - The Horrorist (with David Lloyd, Vertigo, 2-issue mini-series, 1995)
  - Hellblazer Special: Bad Blood (with Philip Bond & Warren Pleece, Vertigo, 4-issue mini-series, 2000)
  - Pandemonium (with Jock, graphic novel, 128 pages, hardcover, Titan Books, March 2010, ISBN 1-84576-865-5, Vertigo, February 2010, ISBN 1-4012-2035-5)
- Swamp Thing #77 (with Tom Mandrake, Alfredo Alcala, DC, 1988)
- World Without End (with John Higgins, DC, 6-issue limited series, 1990)
- Animal Man #51–79 (with Steve Pugh, Scott Eaton, Graham Higgins, Russel Braun, Tom Sutton, Rafael Kayanan, Will Simpson, Dan Steffan, Fred Harper, Gene Fama, and Peter Snejbjerg. DC, 1992–1994)
- Batman: Legends of the Dark Knight #64 (with Chris Bachalo, Mark Pennington)
- Ghostdancing (with Richard Case, Vertigo, 6-issue limited series, 1995)
- Vertigo Voices: Tainted (with Al Davison, Vertigo, one-shot, 1995)
- Batman/Manbat (with John Bolton, DC, 1996)
- Twisted Metal 2 (one-shot promo comic)
- 2020 Visions (with Frank Quitely (#1–3), Warren Pleece (#4–6), James Romberger (#7–9) & Steve Pugh (#10–12), Vertigo, 12-issue limited series, 1997)
- Shadowman #5–15 (with co-author Dick Foreman (#14–15) and art by Charlie Adlard, Acclaim Comics, 1997)
- Vertigo Vérité: Hell Eternal (with Sean Phillips, Vertigo, one-shot, 1998)
- Cruel and Unusual (with co-author Tom Peyer, pencils by John McCrea and inks by Andrew Chiu, Vertigo, 4-issue mini-series, 1999)
- The Territory (with David Lloyd, Dark Horse, 4-issue mini-series, 1999, tpb, 96 pages, 2006 ISBN 978-1-59307-010-6)
- Legends of the DC Universe #24–25 (with Steve Pugh, DC, 2000)
- Outlaw Nation (with Goran Sudžuka, Vertigo, 19-issue series, 2000–2002, tpb, 456 pages, Image Comics, 2006, ISBN 1-58240-707-X)
- Nevermore: "The Pit and the Pendulum" (with Steve Pugh, graphic novel adaptation, Eye Classics, Self Made Hero, October 2007, ISBN 978-0-9552856-8-4)
- The Lovecraft Anthology 2: "Pickman's Model" (with Steve Pugh, graphic novel adaptation, Self Made Hero, 2012, ISBN 978-1-9068384-3-0)
- Narcopolis (with Jeremy Rock, 4-issue mini-series, Avatar Press, February 2008)
- Rawbone (with Max Fiumara, 4-issue mini-series, Avatar Press, 2009)
- Crossed: Badlands #4–9 (with Leandro Rizzo, Avatar Press, 2012)

Prose work includes:

- Book Thirteen (as A.W. James, Lepus Books, 2012)
- Leepus: Dizzy (as J. Delano, Lepus Books, 2014)
- Leepus: The River (as J. Delano, Lepus Books, 2017)
- Finn of the Islunds (as J. Delano, Lazarus Corporation, 2020)

== Notes ==
Preceded by None	Hellblazer writer 1988–1990	Succeeded by Grant Morrison
Preceded by Neil Gaiman	Hellblazer writer 1990	Succeeded by Dick Foreman
Preceded by Dick Foreman	Hellblazer writer 1990–1991	Succeeded by Garth Ennis
Preceded by Garth Ennis	Hellblazer writer 1994	Succeeded by Eddie Campbell
