= Warren Pleece =

British comic artist

- Area: Artist

Warren Pleece is a British comics artist. He is best known for his work at the DC Comics imprint Vertigo and the 2012–16 Irish novel series Zom-B.

== Biography ==
Warren, with his brother Gary Pleece, wrote and drew three issues of a self-published comics magazine called Velocity between 1987 and 1989. A satirical collection of stories, there were no recurring characters, but many recognisable caricatures from politics and pop culture. The fourth issue was published by Acme Press in 1990. Their first non-self-published work appeared in Escape magazine.

Warren Pleece also collaborated with Woodrow Phoenix on Sinister Romance, a comic published by Harrier Comics. He then collaborated with Irish writer Garth Ennis on the strip True Faith, serialised in Crisis and eventually published as a trade paperback. True Faith sparked some controversy in the UK with an article in the Daily Mail due to its story being critical about Christianity.

Pleece contributed Second City Blues to the comic 2000 AD, which was a series set in a futuristic Birmingham, with teams playing a deadly sport similar to the one portrayed in the film Rollerball.

Pleece has since worked professionally mainly for DC Comics. He began with a four-issue Vertigo series featuring the Tattooed Man and has since contributed to the Hellblazer series, The Invisibles with Grant Morrison, and Kinetic by Kelley Puckett.

== Bibliography ==
=== Comics ===
- "Comics Are Really Great" (with Gary Pleece, in A1 #2, 1989)
- "Leone Ryder" (with Gary Pleece, in A1 #3, 1990)
- "The Numbers Game" (with Gary Pleece, in Revolver: The Horror Special, 1990)
- True Faith (with Garth Ennis, in Crisis #29–34 & #34–38, 1989–1990)
- Skin Graft: The Adventures of a Tattooed Man (with Jerry Prosser, 4-issue mini-series, Vertigo, 1993)
- Sandman Mystery Theatre #33–36 (with Steven T. Seagle/Matt Wagner, Vertigo, 1995)
- Hellblazer #115–128 (with Paul Jenkins, Vertigo, 1997–1998)
- 2020 Visions #4–6 (with Jamie Delano, Vertigo, 1997)
- The Invisibles (vol. 3) #11-9 (with Grant Morrison, Vertigo, 1999)
- Deadenders (pencils, with Ed Brubaker and inks by Richard Case/Cameron Stewart, Vertigo, 2000–2001)
- Lucifer #4 (with Mike Carey and inks by Dean Ormston, Vertigo, 2000)
- The Monarchy #3 (with Doselle Young and inks by Garry Leach, Wildstorm, 2001)
- Kinetic (with Kelley Puckett, DC Comics, 2004, collected in tpb, 2005, ISBN 1-4012-0472-4)
- Second City Blues (with Kek-W, in 2000 AD #1420–1431, 2005)
- Incognegro (with Mat Johnson, graphic novel, Vertigo, hardcover, Titan Books, August 2008, ISBN 1-84856-071-0, Vertigo, February 2008, ISBN 1-4012-1097-X)
- "Coventry" (with Harvey Pekar, in American Splendor (vol. 2) #3, Vertigo, 2008)
- Life Sucks (with Jessica Abel and Gabriel Soria, First Second, 2008, ISBN 978-1-59643-107-2)
- Dandridge: "Return of the Chap" (with Alec Worley, in 2000 AD #1710–1714, November–December 2010)
- The Great Unwashed with Gary Pleece, Escape Books, 2012, ISBN 978-0-9570694-0-4

=== Novels ===
Zom-B by Darren O'Shaughnessy (as Darren Shan)

- Zom-B – 27 September 2012 (16 October 2012 in the US)
- Zom-B Underground – 3 January 2013
- Zom-B City – 14 March 2013
- Zom-B Angels – 20 June 2013
- Zom-B Baby – 26 September 2013 (1 October 2013 in the US)
- Zom-B Gladiator – 2 January 2014
- Zom-B Mission – 27 March 2014
- Zom-B Clans – 3 July 2014
- Zom-B Family – 25 September 2014
- Zom-B Bride – 1 January 2015 (24 February 2015 in the US)
- Zom-B Fugitive – 10 September 2015 (22 September 2015 in the US)
- Zom-B Goddess – 22 March 2016
