= Kelley Puckett =

American comic book writer

- Area: Writer

Kelley Puckett is a comic book writer. He is notable for having co-created DC Comics characters Cassandra Cain and Connor Hawke.

== Bibliography ==
=== DC Comics ===
- Batgirl #1-19, 21–25, 27–29, 33-37
- The Batman and Robin Adventures #24
  - Batman & Robin Adventures: Subzero #1
- The Batman Adventures vol. 1 #1-3, 5-30, 34-35
- The Batman Chronicles #12, 35
- Batman Secret Files and Origins #1
- Batman Villains Secret Files and Origins #1
- Batman #566-567
- Batman/Nightwing: Bloodborne #1
- Batman: Batgirl
- Batman: Batgirl vol. 2 #1
- Batman: Gotham Adventures #13
- Batman: Gotham City Secret Files and Origins #1
- Batman: Mask of the Phantasm - The Animated Movie #1
- Batman: No Man's Land Secret Files and Origins #1
- Captain Atom #51
- Cartoon Network Action Pack #55
- The Comet vol. 2 Annual #1
- DC Comics Presents: Batman Adventures #1
- DCU Infinite Holiday Special #1
- Detective Comics #634, 734
- Green Arrow vol. 2 #0, 91-92
- Kinetic #1-8
- Legends of the DC Universe #6, 10-11
- The Question Quarterly #5
- Showcase '96 #6
- Supergirl vol. 5 #23-29, 31-32
- Superman & Batman Magazine #1-2, 4, 6
- Superman Adventures #47

Preceded by none	The Batman Adventures writer 1992–1995	Succeeded by Paul Dini
Preceded by none	Batgirl writer 2000–2003	Succeeded by Dylan Horrocks
Preceded by Tony Bedard	Supergirl writer 2007–2008	Succeeded by Sterling Gates
