= Hellblazer Special: Bad Blood =

House of Mystery
- Cover to issue #1 of Hellblazer Special: Bad Blood (2000).

Publication information
- Publisher: Vertigo
- Schedule: Monthly
- Format: Limited series
- Genre: Horror
- Publication date: 2000
- No. of issues: 4
- Main character(s): John Constantine

Creative team
- Written by: Jamie Delano
- Artist(s): Philip Bond

Hellblazer Special: Bad Blood was a comic book limited series published by the Vertigo imprint of DC Comics in 2000. It was written by Jamie Delano and illustrated by Philip Bond, and features the character John Constantine, albeit several decades after most of his series continuity.

== Plot ==
In the then-year of 2025, an elderly John Constantine has forsaken the world of magic. The monarchy of the United Kingdom is sputtering out, and John's friend Dolly is being held captive on a reality TV show that revolves around the premise that she is the sole heir to the English throne. Numerous interest groups of the pro- and anti-monarchy variety attempt to influence the show in the direction they favor. After Dolly is rescued by Constantine, she reveals that he is the father of her unborn child. Constantine is then faced with the decision of whether or not he wants his progeny crowned king of England.

== Collected editions ==
A reprint of the entire series was collected under the Vertigo Resurrected line; the solicited release for this collection is June 2011. It was also collected in the Hellblazer Volume 26: The Curse of the Constantines trade paperback in March 2022.
