= Al Davison =

English comic book artist

Al Davison (born 1960) is an English comic book writer and artist from Newcastle, England.

He is most famous for his autobiographical graphic novel The Spiral Cage (Renegade Press, 1988, longer version Titan Books, 1990, Absolute edition from Active Images, 2003), which describes his lifelong struggle with spina bifida and his rise to successful comic book creator, martial arts instructor, film maker, and performer. The Spiral Cage featured in Tony Isabella's 1000 Comic Books You Must Read.

He is the subject of a documentary, also called The Spiral Cage, directed by Paul W. S. Anderson.

As part of the 10-day Festival800, which took place in Lincoln from 28 August to 6 September 2015, he has been commissioned to create Manga Carta – a 10-page, 30-panel graphic tale of the journey and impact of the 800-year-old Magna Carta. Manga Carta is available for download from the festival website since mid-August 2015.

He now resides in Coventry, where he runs The Astral Gypsy, his studio and comic shop in Fargo Village, Far Gosford Street, with his wife Maggie.

== Bibliography ==
- Crisis, issue 34, 1989
- Bruce Lee: The Elusive Dragon, 1983
- The Spiral Cage original graphic novel, 1990
- Minotaur's Tale Dark Horse Books, 1992
- Tainted (with Jamie Delano) one-shot, 1995
- The Endless Gallery, one-shot, 1995
- Teknophage, (with Paul Jenkins) 7–10, 1995
- Hellblazer issue 101 (with Paul Jenkins) (mistakenly credited to Sean Phillips), 1996
- Vermillion, 1–7, (with Lucius Shepard) 1996-97
- The Dreaming, 20–21, 1998
- The Dreaming, (with Caitlin R Kiernan) 41, 1999
- Spiral Dreams 2000
- 9/11, anthology, one story, 2002
- The Spiral Cage Active Image edition, 2003
- Hokusai Demons Astral Gypsy Ltd, 2009
- Doctor Who, (with Tony Lee) 1–2, 7-8 2009-10
- Doctor Who, 2010
- The Unwritten issue 24, 2009
- House of Mystery issue 17, 2009
- The Alchemist's Easel The Astral Gypsy Ltd 2013
- Tommy Taylor & The Ship That Sank Twice Vertigo 2014
- The Unwritten Apocalypse #5 & #7 Vertigo 2014
- Manga Carta, 2015
