= Steve Pugh =

British comic book artist (born 1966)

- Born: 24 March 1966 (age 60) Birmingham, England
- Areas: Writer, Artist, Inker, Letterer, Colourist
- Notable works: Hellblazer Hotwire

Steve Pugh (/pjuː/ PEW; born 24 March 1966) is a British comic book artist who has worked for American and British comic producers including DC, Marvel, Dark Horse and 2000 AD.

He broke into the industry in the early 1990s working on Hellblazer at DC's Vertigo studio. He is known for doing both pencil art and inking on issues. He has worked on both sides of the Atlantic and has worked for all of the major studios on a variety of titles including Blade, Doctor Strange, JLA, and X-Men.

While at Marvel, he contributed to issue #8 of Star Trek Unlimited, "The Boy, The Warrior, and The Veteran" doing all of the art for the story "The Boy".

== Biography ==
Pugh's earliest work included penciling John Ostrander's Youngblood, telling the story of his futuristic sword and sorcery character Grimjack's childhood and early adulthood, as well as providing covers for the Grimjack Case Files limited series. He also illustrated Pat Mills' Third World War before starting a brief run on Hellblazer and a long run on Animal Man with Jamie Delano. Pugh returned to Animal Man starting with issue 7, replacing Travel Foreman and working with Jeff Lemire. He drew a 12 issue run on The Flintstones, which was nominated for 2 Eisner awards, and written by Mark Russell with whom he also made Billionaire Island. Pugh has worked on a Harley Quinn graphic novel.

Recent work includes writing and drawing Hotwire: Requiem for the Dead, a story based on concepts developed by Warren Ellis. It was originally planned to appear in Atomeka Press's Blast and then in 2005 their Bojeffries Terror Tomes #1 before finally being published by Radical Comics.

== Bibliography ==
Comics work includes:

- Third World War (with Pat Mills):
  - "Ivan's story: Why me?" (in Crisis #36, January 1990)
  - "Anchorman" (in Crisis #50, September 1990)
- Youngblood (Not to be confused with the Image Comics series of the same name by Rob Liefeld) (with John Ostrander, back-up story in Grimjack #70-81, First Comics, May 1990 - April 1991)
- Hellblazer #32, 37–39 (with Jamie Delano, Vertigo, August 1990 - March 1991)
- Strontium Dog: "Monsters" (with Garth Ennis, in 2000 AD #750-761, September–December 1991)
- Animal Man
  - Vol. 1: #46, 51–57, 61–63, 66–70, 72–73, 75–76, 78-79 (with Jamie Delano, DC Comics, between April 1992 – January 1995)
  - Vol. 2: #0, 5, 7-10, 12-15 (with Jeff Lemire, DC Comics, between January 2012 - December 2012)
- Preacher: "Saint of Killers" #1-2, 4 (with Garth Ennis, 4-issue mini-series, Vertigo, 1996)
- Penthouse Comix:
  - "Velvet Flytrap & Friends" (pin-up, in Penthouse Comix #10, 1995)
  - "Young Captain Adventure: Mars Needs Men!!!" (with Ian Edginton, in Penthouse Comix #13, 1996)
  - "By Royal Appointment: The Queen of England" (illustrated text story, with unknown author, in Penthouse Comix #29, 1998)
  - "Rolling Thunder: Big Girls Don't Cry" (with Ian Edginton, in Penthouse Comix #31, 1998)
- 2020 Visions #10-12 (with Jamie Delano, Vertigo, 12-issue limited series, 1997)
- Hitman (with writer Garth Ennis and co-artist Carlos Ezquerra, in Pulp Heroes Annual #1, DC Comics, 1997)
- Dead Corps (with writer Christopher Hinz), Helix, 4-issue mini-series, 1998
- Darkseid (with Jamie Delano, DC Comics, 2-issue mini-series, 2000)
- Superman vs. The Terminator: Death to the Future (pencils, with writer Alan Grant and inks by Mike Perkins, 4-issue mini-series, DC Comics and Dark Horse Comics, 2000)
- Generation X (with co-writers Warren Ellis & Brian Wood and inker Sandu Florea, Marvel, 2000–2001)
- Blade #1-5 (with writer Christopher Hinz, Marvel MAX, May–September 2002)
- Interceptor (with Ian Edginton, in 2000 AD #1337-1345, 2003)
- Vampirella/Witchblade #1: "Brooklyn Bounce" (with Brian Wood, Harris Comics, 2003)
- Judge Dredd: "Inside Job" (with Ian Edginton, in 2000 AD #1363-1364, 2003)
- "Honor Bound" (with Ian Edginton, in Star Wars Tales 22, Dark Horse Comics, 2005)
- Rogue Trooper: "New Model Army" (with Ian Edginton, in 2000 AD #1477-1479, 2006)
- Nevermore: "The Pit and the Pendulum" (with Jamie Delano, graphic novel adaptation, Eye Classics, Self Made Hero, October 2007, ISBN 978-0-9552856-8-4)
- Hotwire (script and art, Radical Comics):
  - Requiem for the Dead (4-issue mini-series, February–August 2009, tpb, 128 pages, May 2010, ISBN 978-0-9802335-3-7)
  - Deep Cut (3-issue mini-series, July 2010-January 2011, tpb, 96 pages, November 2011, ISBN 978-1-935417-41-5)
- Harley Quinn: Breaking Glass, 3rd ed. Sept. 2019, 208 pages, DC Ink, ISBN 978-1-401283292 with author Mariko Tamaki
