= List of 2000 AD stories =

2000 AD is a British anthology magazine which has been published since 1977. 2000 AD has featured both long-running titles (like Judge Dredd and ABC Warriors) as well as dozens of shorter series and one-offs. In addition, features like Tharg's Future Shocks allowed the publication of single stories by any writer and still acts as a training ground for aspiring writers; it is where both Alan Moore and Grant Morrison started in comics. 2000 AD has absorbed two of its sister titles, Tornado and Starlord.

Wikimedia Commons has an index of 2000 AD stories that were published from February 1977 to September 2026 (#1 to #2500).

== Stories ==
=== 0–9 ===
- The 86ers

=== A ===
- ABC Warriors
- Abelard Snazz
- Absalom
- Ace Trucking Co.
- Age of the Wolf
- Agent Rat
- A.H.A.B.
- The Alienist
- Al's Baby
- American Gothic
- Ampney Crucis Investigates
- Anderson: PSI Division
- Angel
- Angel Zero
- Ant Wars
- Apocalypse Soon
- Aquila
- Armitage
- Armageddon: The Bad Man
- Armoured Gideon
- Asylum
- Atavar

=== B ===
- Babe Race 2000
- Bad City Blue
- Bad Company
- Badlands
- The Ballad of Halo Jones
- The Balls Brothers
- Banzai Battalion
- Batman/Judge Dredd: Judgement on Gotham
- Bec & Kawl
- The Bendatti Vendetta
- Big Dave
- Bison
- Bix Barton
- Black Atlantic
- Black Light
- Black Siddha
- Blackhawk
- Black Shuck
- BLAIR One
- Blood of Satanus
- Bob Byrne's Twisted Tales
- The Bogie Man
- Bones of Eden
- Bonjo from Beyond the Stars
- Bradley
- Brass Sun
- Breathing Space
- Brit-Cit Babes
- Brigand Doom
- Brink
- Button Man

=== C ===
- Caballistics, Inc.
- Canon Fodder
- Captain Klep
- Carver Hale
- Chiaroscuro
- Chopper
- Chronos Carnival
- Citi-Def
- The Clown
- Colony Earth
- The Corps
- Counterfeit Girl
- Cradlegrave
- Cursed Earth Koburn
- Tor Cyan

=== D ===
- D.R. and Quinch
- Damnation Station
- Dan Dare
- Dandridge
- Danzig's Inferno
- Darkness Visible
- Dash Decent
- The Dead
- Dead Eyes
- Deadlock
- The Dead Man
- Dead Meat
- Dead Men Walking
- Dead Signal
- Death Planet
- Defoe
- Detonator X
- Dinosty
- Disaster 1990
- Downlode Tales
- Droid Life
- Dry Run
- Durham Red

=== F ===
- Family
- Feral and Foe
- Fervant and Lobe
- Fiends of the Eastern Front
- Finn
- Firekind
- Flesh
- Freaks
- Friday
- From Grace
- Full Tilt Boogie
- Future Shocks

=== G ===
- Glimmer Rats
- Go-Machine
- Grey Area
- Greysuit
- The Grudge Father

=== H ===
- Harmony
- Hap Hazzard
- Harke & Burr
- Harlem Heroes
- Harry Kipling (Deceased)
- Harry Twenty on the High Rock
- Helium
- The Helltrekkers
- Hershey & Steel
- Hewligan's Haircut
- Holocaust 12
- Hunted

=== I ===
- Ichabod Azrael
- Indigo Prime
- The Inspectre
- Insurrection
- Interceptor
- Invasion
- I Was a Teenage Tax Consultant

=== J ===
- Jack Point: Simping Detective
- Jaegir
- Janus: Psi Division
- A Joe Black Adventure
- Johnny Woo
- The Journal of Luke Kirby
- Judge Death
- Judge Dredd
- Judge Hershey
- Judge Karyn
- Juliet November
- Junker

=== K ===
- Kelly
- Kid Cyborg
- Killer
- Kingdom
- Kola Kommandos

=== L ===
- Lazarus Churchyard
- Leatherjack
- Lenny Zero
- Leviathan
- A Life Less Ordinary
- Lobster Random
- London Falling
- A Love Like Blood
- Low Life

=== M ===
- M.A.C.H. 1
- Maelstrom
- Malone
- Mambo
- Maniac 5
- Marauder
- Mazeworld
- The Mean Arena
- Mean Team
- Medivac 318
- Meet Darren Dead
- Meltdown Man
- Mercy Heights
- Metalzoic
- Middenface McNulty
- The Mind of Wolfie Smith
- Missionary Man
- Moon Runners
- Mother Earth

=== N ===
- Necronauts
- Necrophim
- Nemesis & Deadlock
- Nemesis the Warlock
- Night Zero
- Nikolai Dante

=== O ===
- One-Off
- The Order
- Orlok, Agent of East-Meg One
- The Out
- Outlaw
- Outlier

=== P ===
- Pandora
- Past Imperfect
- Project Overkill
- Proteus Vex
- Pulp Sci-fi
- Purgatory
- Pussyfoot 5

=== R ===
- R.A.M. Raiders
- Rain Dogs
- Really & Truly
- Red Fang
- Red Razors
- The Red Seas
- Return to Armageddon
- Revere
- Rick Random
- Ro-Busters
- Ro-Jaws' Robo-Tales
- Roadkill
- Robo-Hunter
- Rogue Trooper
- Rose O'Rion

=== S ===
- Samantha Slade
- Samizdat Squad
- Sancho Panzer
- Satanus
- Savage
- The Scarlet Apocrypha
- Scarlet Traces
- The Scrap
- Second City Blues
- Shadows
- Shakara
- Shako!
- Shaun of the Dead
- Shimura
- Silo
- Sinister Dexter
- Skizz
- Sláine
- Slaughterbowl
- Sleaze 'n' Ryder
- Snow/Tiger
- Sooner or Later
- Soul Gun Warrior
- Soul Sisters
- The Spacegirls
- The Stainless Steel Rat
- Stalag #666
- Stickleback
- Stone Island
- Storming Heaven
- The Straitjacket Fits
- Strange Cases
- Strontium Dog
- Strontium Dogs
- Survival Geeks
- Synnamon

=== T ===
- Tainted
- Tales of Telguuth
- Tales from Beyond Science
- Tales from the Black Museum
- Tales from the Doghouse
- Tales from Mega-City One
- Tao de Moto
- Tempest
- Tharg the Mighty
- Tharg's 3rillers
- Tharg's Alien Invasions
- Tharg's Dragon Tales
- Tharg's Terror Tales
- The Ten-Seconders
- Thirteen
- Thistlebone
- Tiger Sun, Dragon Moon
- Time Flies
- Timehouse
- Timequake
- Time Twisters
- Torquemada
- Tracer
- Trash
- Tribal Memories
- Tyranny Rex

=== U ===
- Ulysses Sweet
- Universal Soldier
- Urban Strike

=== V ===
- Valkyries
- Vanguard
- The V.C.s
- Vector 13
- Venus Bluegenes
- The Visible Man
- The Vort

=== W ===
- Walter the Wobot
- Wardog
- What If...?
- Whatever Happened To?
- Wireheads
- Witch World

=== X ===
- XTNCT

=== Y ===
- Young Middenface

=== Z ===
- The Zaucer of Zilk
- Zenith
- Zippy Couriers
- Zombo

== See also ==
- List of minor 2000 AD stories
