= 2000 AD crossovers =

Crossover comics

2000 AD crossovers are crossover stories appearing in British comic 2000 AD, its sister title the Judge Dredd Megazine, and other related output, such as novels, audio plays, films and role-playing games.

Not all of the stories told in 2000 AD and its related publications exist in the same shared universe, unlike in some other comics, for example, the DC and Marvel Universes. Indeed the majority of stories which have appeared in 2000 AD since 1977 have never been connected with each other. However, the series which are so connected are generally the most significant ones in the comic in terms of the number of issues they have appeared in, their popularity with readers, and their significance in the history of the comic.

2000 AD logo.

== Stories set in a shared universe ==
Those 2000 AD stories which occupy a shared universe and have crossed over with each other include:

- ABC Warriors
- Durham Red
- Flesh
- Harlem Heroes
- Invasion!
- Judge Dredd
- Nemesis the Warlock
- Ro-Busters
- Rogue Trooper
- Mercy Heights
- Strontium Dog
- Young Middenface

== Connections between stories ==
Series can be linked to each other in either of two ways: crossovers and spin-offs. There are also combinations of both.

=== Crossovers ===
Firstly, series which were completely independent of each other when they were created – often by different writers, and sometimes even in different comics – were later linked to each other. This could be done either by a crossover story in which two or more characters from the respective series meet each other, or by a caption or piece of dialogue explicitly referring to events which occurred or characters who appeared in an earlier story in another series. Two examples of the former kind are the Judge Dredd stories "Top Dogs" and "Judgement Day", which both featured Johnny Alpha from the series Strontium Dog in a major role. Alpha lived over half a century in Dredd's future, and the crossover was accomplished by having Alpha time-travel back to Dredd's era. An example of the second kind is the Judge Dredd story "The Cursed Earth," which featured a dinosaur called Satanus who was described as the clone of the offspring of the female dinosaur which had appeared in most episodes of the earlier series Flesh. Flesh was a previously unconnected series about humans time travelling back to the Cretaceous era to harvest dinosaurs for their meat.

Sometimes the link between two series can be of paramount importance to the story (such as Alpha's appearance in Judge Dredd); in other stories the reference can be a passing homage to an earlier tale with no effect whatsoever on the plot of the story in which it occurs (such as the reference to Satanus' ancestry in "The Cursed Earth"). In either case, once a connection between two series was established, it was often repeated. For example, "Top Dogs" was followed up by "Judgement Day," and the reference to Flesh in Judge Dredd was reciprocated by the cameo appearance of a Mega-City judge in Nemesis the Warlock Book V, which was itself a crossover with Flesh because it featured Satanus in a major role.

This latter example illustrates how series were not just linked to each other in pairs, but in multitudes. Pat Mills, the first editor of 2000 AD and creator of many enduring series, was responsible for many such connections. He deliberately connected his own series ABC Warriors to Flesh, and then linked Nemesis to both. (All three series were created by him, but they had originally had nothing to do with each other.) For example, ABC Warriors made a passing reference to a dinosaur being the son of Satanus. Satanus himself subsequently played an important part in Nemesis Book V, by which time the entire cast of ABC Warriors had themselves moved to the Nemesis strip. This therefore established that Judge Dredd, Flesh, Nemesis, and ABC Warriors all existed in the same continuity: a list which would be added to many more times.

=== Spin-offs ===
Secondly, a new series can be created as a deliberate offshoot from a parent series. This can also occur in two ways. One method was to take a supporting character from an existing series and start a new series with that character in the lead (sometimes with the lead character from the original series appearing in a cameo). Two examples are Judge Anderson, first introduced in Judge Dredd, being given her own series, Anderson: Psi Division, five years later; and Durham Red getting her own series after her debut in Strontium Dog. Since Judge Dredd and Strontium Dog occupy the same universe, it follows that Anderson and Red do too (although they have never both appeared in the same story).

Another method was to create a brand new character for a new series, but to state from the outset that the story took place in an existing environment from an established strip. Most of the series in the Judge Dredd Megazine were created in this way. In 2000 AD The 86ers was a series set in the world of Rogue Trooper which did not feature the established cast of its parent strip.

=== Early issues ===
In the earliest issues and annuals, connections and crossovers would link up many of the earliest strips. The most prominent examples are Harlem Heroes ending and then the lead character's son turning up as a cadet judge in the next issue; The Cursed Earth linking Dredd's future to Flesh with Satanus, the cloned son of tyrannosaur One-Eye; and ABC Warriors starting as a prequel to Ro-Busters, a sequel to Invasion!, and then introducing a sequel to Flesh and The Cursed Earth with Satanus's son. Minor links included Ro-Jaws watching the Harlem Heroes and a comrade of Hammerstein referring to the under-construction Mega-City One in Ro-Busters flashbacks; a Mega-City Time Tour feature in an annual, where Flesh corporation Trans-Time offered holidays to both 2103 Mega-City One and 1999 Volgan-occupied England.

=== Rogue Trooper ===
The series Rogue Trooper was both a crossover and a spin-off from itself. The original series ran in 2000 AD from issues 228 to 635, when it ended. A completely new series of Rogue Trooper then began in issue 650, by a different writer. This was not intended to be a sequel to the old version, but was a brand new, modernised reinterpretation of the character, with significant differences from the old version. It was not supposed to be set in the same universe or continuity, but was a total replacement (or "reboot") of both. However, years later and in the hands of a new writer, a story was written which established that the new and old Rogue Troopers were two different people inhabiting the same universe, and a convoluted continuity was contrived to explain their co-existence. In an unusually complicated crossover, the two Rogue Troopers actually met each other. This state of affairs did not continue for long, however, and the old version was killed off. Ironically, the new version declined in popularity and the strip was discontinued, only to be replaced with the original version, in stories set before the original's death.

There have been a number of less complicated Rogue Trooper spinoffs largely following the adventures of the other G.I.s, like Venus Bluegenes, Rafaelle Blue and Tor Cyan. The new version of Rogue met Judge Dredd in a special story which took up the whole of issue 900 (the first time this had ever happened in what is usually an anthology comic containing five stories per issue).

=== Laissez-faire approach ===
While 2000 AD writers and editors have generally ensured that events occurring in spin-offs and their parent series are usually mutually consistent with each other, so that events in one such strip do not contradict events in another, much less care – if any – is taken to ensure a uniform continuity between crossover series. Therefore, while events which occur in the Anderson, Psi Division spin-off may have repercussions in Judge Dredd and vice versa, the continuity of Strontium Dog might be ignored.

This can even occur within the crossover story itself: in "Judgement Day" Johnny Alpha travelled back in time from 2178 to 2114 to arrest a time-travelling criminal so he would not wipe out Earth (and thus, the future). The death of three billion people and destruction of five whole mega-cities then seemed to have no impact on Alpha's era. It was never explained in the story how an event as significant as a world war did not appear to be remembered by history in Alpha's era. On top of that, the future history of Strontium Dog bears little resemblance to Dredd, with no mega-cities and mutants as an underclass in 'norm' cities in 2150. (The Americans in Judge Dredd Megazine no. 283 implied that Strontium Dog's nuclear war will occur in 2150, but this was a MacGuffin to drive the story forward.)

In these cases, the crossover is not a serious attempt at world-building and continuity, simply a means of having two popular characters meet. Writer John Wagner has even stated that he does not view Strontium Dog and Judge Dredd as being in the same continuity.

Writers have also changed their minds over time. In the 2000s ABC Warriors stories, there is no attempt at fitting the Volgan War into Dredd's timeline or Harlem Heroes (but he does refer to Nemesis The Warlock in Dredd: Blood of Satanus II, in order to declare Satanus Unchained out of canon). Other writers have also made no mention of this, and generally do not link up non-Dredd strips. It is also a habit of writers who created a strip to ignore the work of others if they feel like it. The John Wagner story Origins refers to Pat Mills' Dredd stories but makes no attempt to acknowledge Invasion!, ABC Warriors, and Ro-Busters (or Harlem Heroes); The Life and Death of Johnny Alpha acknowledges and retcons his death under Alan Grant, but deliberately erases Strontium Dogs (with a narrator calling Peter Hogan's strips the work of "notorious fantasist Ho Gan"). In the sequel series Savage, Mills acknowledges the original Invasion! (to the extent that there's a King Charles III in the 2000s, just as prog 1 said) but ignores the prequel strip Disaster 1990!. And while Harlem Heroes was linked to Dredd, the sequel strip Inferno was left separate until Al Ewing's Dredd Year One: Wear Iron novella.

== Crossovers ==
As most of the 2000 AD crossovers occur on the same timeline, not in parallel universes, the majority of crossovers take place thanks to the widespread, but temperamental, time travel technology that was invented at the beginning of the 22nd century.

=== Stories by Pat Mills ===
Pat Mills was responsible for the majority of the crossovers.

- Judge Dredd: "The Cursed Earth" introduced the dinosaur Satanus and linked Judge Dredd to Flesh.
- ABC Warriors: "Golgotha", in the first series, featured the son of Satanus and linked ABC Warriors to Flesh.
- Nemesis the Warlock: "Book IV: The Gothic Empire" introduced both the ABC Warriors and the Ro-Jaws character from Ro-Busters to Nemesis. "Book V: The Vengeance of Thoth" featured the return of Satanus in a major role, and a cameo by a judge of Mega-City One, linking Nemesis to Flesh and Judge Dredd. In a later Dredd strip by Mills, Dredd referred to Satanus' return to the Cretaceous in Nemesis (how he knew about it was not explained).
- Judge Dredd: "Hammerstein" featured ABC Warrior Hammerstein in the Cursed Earth outside Mega-City One, following the Atomic Wars started by President Booth in 2070. This linked ABC Warriors to Judge Dredd, in addition to the existing Satanus connection. (This link was retconned away in other strips.)
- The Volgans appear as the enemies of Bill Savage in Invasion!, and also in early episodes of ABC Warriors as the enemies of the character Hammerstein and the creators of the ABC warrior Blackblood. Flashback stories have shown more of the Volgan War, and Volgan robot Volkhan was introduced as a 'present' day villain in The Volgan War Book One.
- Savage Books 5, 6 and 7 included characters and backstory from Ro-Busters.
- Another ABC Warriors story in 2012, "Return to Earth," established further links between Savage and Ro-Busters.

=== Stories by Ian Edginton ===
Writer Ian Edginton has begun linking his pseudo-historical strips together, both covertly and overtly. Images of both Jack Dancer from The Red Seas and Hastur from Leviathan later appeared in Stickleback; the pub "The Jolly Cripple", a haunt of the Red Seas pirates, reappears as the haunt of the character Detective Valentine Bey and contains a portrait of the original proprietress from Red Seas; and Leviathan villain William Ashbless briefly appears in Stickleback as a member of the sinister City Fathers group.

In the second Stickleback, the eponymous lead visits the London-based Brotherhood of the Book from The Red Seas, in the process meeting (and revealing history with) Seas villain Orlando Doyle. There is also an appearance by Herbert Sewell, an unfortunate and long-suffering scientist/time traveller in Edginton's Judge Dredd stories, being dragged into Bedlam; and an ogre of the same species seen in Edginton's American Gothic Wild West strip is seen at the villain's Wild West show. The Red Seas would later reveal that Stickleback's Orlando was from an alternate universe, and that the Brotherhood of the Book exists in multiple universes.

Ampney Crucis Investigates made the connections stronger: characters referred to the Leviathan ship and the myth of the Hollow Earth from The Red Seas; the otherworldly monsters were given a similar background as in Stickleback; and a shadowy antagonist was shown to have a staff with a bust of Hastur's head. Stickleback's son appears in the fourth Ampney Crucis story as an adult, London's crime lord in an alternate dimension; in the same world, an underground society of cyborg fanatics called "Babbagists" has sprung up around the works of Countess Bernoulli, a Stickleback villain.

=== Stories by John Smith ===
The writer John Smith often places a number of his characters in the same stories, which has become known among fans as the Smithiverse. These generally stand together as an independent universe of their own. However, one particular species of alien of Smith's creation has appeared in both the Smithiverse (in Firekind and Tyranny Rex) and in a Judge Dredd universe story (Pussyfoot 5, a spin-off from Devlin Waugh) and Waugh has appeared in Dredd stories.

Smithiverse stories include Indigo Prime, Tyranny Rex and Firekind.

=== Stories by other writers ===
==== Judge Dredd stories ====
A number of characters have appeared in Judge Dredd stories (or vice versa).

===== Ant Wars =====
Dredd spinoff Zancudo! by Simon Spurrier revealed itself to be a sequel to Ant Wars, a 1970s strip about giant ants rampaging through South America, in the cliffhanger ending to Part 2. The giant ants were revealed to be living in the jungles near Ciudad Barranquilla, and were at war with the giant mosquitos that formed the strip's villains.

===== Harlem Heroes =====
The first Judge Giant was the son of Giant of the Harlem Heroes, and his father was shown upon Giant's graduation from the Academy of Law. Later on, Judge Giant Jr (the first Judge Giant's son) would meet his aged grandfather a few days before he died.

===== Rogue Trooper =====
Souther troops flee Nu-Earth back through time to Mega-City One in 2116. They reach an agreement with the judges where they swap medical aid for technology. Friday is blamed for the massacre but, as his memory returns, he realises a traitor is at work and tries to track him down. Unfortunately it seems a far more famous clone may try and stop him – Judge Dredd.

An early version of the Genetic Infantry program is shown in Judge Dredd: Warzone.

===== Skizz =====
The Gunlords of Omega Ceti try to kill Skizz by travelling back in time but somehow end up in 22nd century Australia where they met Dredd.

===== Strontium Dog =====
Dredd has crossed the path of Strontium Dogs Johnny Alpha and Wulf Sternhammer a couple of times. In the first encounter they travelled back in time to Mega-City One, 2112, and were nearly arrested by Dredd. Later, Johnny Alpha again stepped back in time to 2114 and helped Judge Dredd save Mega-City One from a zombie apocalypse during Judgement Day. A spin-off audio drama, Pre-Emptive Revenge, by Big Finish showed Dredd and Alpha in the immediate aftermath of Judgement Day.

===== Judge Dredd: "Helter Skelter" =====
Helter Skelter was a storyline by Garth Ennis, featuring an invasion of Mega-City One by an alliance of villains from parallel universes. Due to the distortion of reality, characters from dozens of 2000 AD strips made cameo appearances, either in the background or as parts of the plot (Dredd is attacked by the vampires from Fiends of the Eastern Front and then has to avoid Old One-Eye from Flesh).

===== Judge Dredd: "The Cold Deck" and "Trifecta" =====
The Cold Deck was a story written by Al Ewing which ran in 2000 AD at the same time as two other series set in Dredd's world, The Simping Detective and Low Life. These stories initially appeared to have no other connection with each other, but after each of them had been running independently for a couple of issues their plotlines unexpectedly intertwined with each other, and it became apparent that Ewing had collaborated with the writers of the other two series, Simon Spurrier and Rob Williams, to create a single large crossover story. The three series merged into a single story for their concluding part, called Trifecta, which took up every page of 2000 AD #1812.

===== Judge Dredd: "The Rubicon" =====
Judge Dredd Megazine #381 (March 2017) ends with the reveal that one of the British teenagers kidnapped by mutants was Johnny Alpha's father, Nelson Kreelman.

===== Judge Dredd: "End of Days" =====
In the "End of Days" by Rob Williams (2020), Ichabod Azrael from The Grievous Journey of Ichabod Azrael (and the Dead Left in his Wake) travels to Dredd's world to stop the Four Horsemen of the Apocalypse from destroying the world.

===== Judge Dredd: "Trinity" =====
In Trinity written by Ken Niemand and published in prog 2262 the 2000AD comic book Dredd encounters the Sylvester Stallone Dredd from the 1995 film and the Karl Urban Dredd from the 2012 film while chasing a perp. They compare their methods, ethics, uniforms and views on each other with the comic and 2012 film Dredds not liking the 1995 film Dredd, being shocked and stunned at him removing his helmet on the street, and the comic Dredd criticising the 2012 film Dredd as being too violent and cruel. The story served as parody and look back at the criticisms of both the films as well as comparing them directly to the original comic character.

===== Judge Dredd: "The Darkest Judge" =====
2000 AD #2300 and Judge Dredd Megazine #448 (September 2022) together featured several non-canonical episodes from various different series, some of which had no previous connection with Judge Dredd and were not set in Dredd's world. These collectively formed one overall story about zombies taking over the multiverse.

===== Judge Dredd Vs Strontium Dog =====
Garth Ennis wrote a story for 2000 AD #2347 (December 2025) that was set immediately after the events of "Judgement Day" with Dredd and Johnny debating mutant rights on their walk home.

==== Rogue Trooper and Mercy Heights ====
- Rogue Trooper: "Blue on Blue" and sequels joined the original and new versions of the character in the same continuity (see above).
- Mercy Heights was initially a new series with no connection to Rogue Trooper. When the series ended Tor Cyan, a character from the series, began his own eponymous series, in which it was eventually revealed that he was a genetic infantryman like Rogue Trooper.

== Spin-offs ==
This list does not include direct sequels, such as Inferno and Savage.

=== Judge Dredd spin-offs ===
Judge Dredd spin-offs include:

- Anderson: Psi Division
- Armitage
- Banzai Battalion
- Chopper
- Surfer
- Cursed Earth Koburn
- The Dead Man
- Devlin Waugh
  - Pussyfoot 5
- Dreadnoughts
- The Helltrekkers
- Insurrection
  - Lawless
- Janus: Psi Division
- Judge Death
  - The Dark Judges
  - The Fall of Deadworld
- Judge Hershey
- Mean Machine
- Missionary Man
- Purgatory
- Red Razors
- Shimura
- The Simping Detective
- Tales from the Black Museum
- Walter the Wobot

=== Rogue Trooper spin-offs ===
The original Rogue Trooper led to:

- The new version, "Friday"
- Venus Bluegenes
- The 86ers
- Jaegir
- Hunted

See also Tor Cyan

=== Other spin-offs ===
- ABC Warriors was a spin-off from Ro-Busters
- Deadlock was a spin-off from ABC Warriors
- Durham Red, Young Middenface, Tales From the Doghouse and Strontium Dogs were spin-offs from Strontium Dog
- Tor Cyan was a spin-off from Mercy Heights

== Parallel universes ==
As well as the tying together of a lot of the stories in 2000 AD, other parallel universes are known to co-exist alongside the main one, and some of them have intruded into it. Most famously in Judge Dredd, this has happened with Judge Death and the Dark Judges, coming from a reality where life is a crime. The aforementioned "Helter Skelter" had a wide range of deceased villains coming from alternate dimensions where they had won, and "Rehab" (progs 1644–8) featured an incursion from a utopian Earth where the Judges are pacifists focused on rehabilitation.

Since 2003, Sinister Dexter has been running a storyline where criminals from a parallel Earth, led by "Holy" Moses Tanenbaum (dead in the main universe), have been trying to take over the city of Downlode in the main universe. When the other Earth was shown, it was revealed a major reason for the move was that China ("the ChiComs") were winning a war against Russia and rapidly advancing towards Downlode. The final part saw Sinister and Dexter chasing a target through other 2000 AD strips, which turned out to be other realities.

== Intercompany crossovers ==
Judge Dredd meets Lobo. Art by Val Semeiks.

There have been numerous intercompany crossovers between 2000 AD stories and with stories published by other companies (DC Comics and Dark Horse Comics). Given his high-profile these often mix other characters with Judge Dredd. These include:

=== Aliens ===
Mr Bones eventually manages to launch his revenge on Mega-City One, unleashing the Xenomorph (called the Incubus here) into the Grand Hall of Justice itself. The story has been mentioned a few times, though the xenomorph's exact origin was kept quiet.

=== Batman ===
There have been four crossovers with Batman: a team-up with Dredd to defeat the combined might of Judge Death, Mean Machine, and The Scarecrow, with the two heroes clashing; Dredd going to Gotham City to save Batman from the Ventriloquist; both heroes being part of a faked deathmatch run by the Riddler; and the Joker and the Dark Judges teaming up, with the Joker becoming a fifth Dark Judge.

The Batman crossovers have had significant impact on Dredd's world. A vision of the fourth crossover, Die Laughing, causing Cassandra Anderson to return to being a Judge, as the crossover was written before she had quit and had been delayed. Judge Death was finally captured due to the events of Judgement on Gotham. Die Laughing had the Dark Judges encased in plasteen crystals, which is how they would always be shown in later stories and the Judge Dredd: Dredd Vs. Death video game; the 2002 story My Name is Death had Dredd refer to "that Gotham clown".

=== Lobo ===
Lobo, the intergalactic mercenary, became a popular character when Alan Grant took on the writing duties so a run-in with Dredd was a logical progression.

=== Predator ===
The Predator has made many visits to Earth throughout history, and in a number of parallel universes, so it was almost inevitable that they would eventually clash with Dredd. The events of the first Predator film and the first comic issues are placed in Dredd continuity: not only are the Judges aware of the events, Psi-Judge Schaefer is a direct descendant of the film character "Dutch" Schaefer.

=== Predator vs Judge Dredd vs Aliens ===
Starting in July 2016, Dark Horse Comics published a four-issue mini-series, Predator vs Judge Dredd vs Aliens, written by John Layman and illustrated by Chris Mooneyham.

=== Judge Dredd vs Razorjack ===
In May 2018 writer Michael Carroll and artist John Higgins produced a crossover story featuring Razorjack, an independent comic on which they had both worked before.

=== Doctor Who ===
There has never been a crossover between a 2000 AD character and Doctor Who. However writer Dave Stone, who has written several Judge Dredd and Doctor Who novels, planned a crossover novel featuring both Dredd and the Doctor, called "Burning Heart". This idea was cancelled due to the lack of success of the 1995 Judge Dredd film, and the book was published in 1997 as a Dr Who book without Dredd. The Virgin Books Who stories featured the Guild of Adjudicators, a law enforcement agency who were often presented as similar to the Judges.

In the revived television series, the episode "Gridlock" was based on Mega-City One, and one character was deliberately dressed like Max Normal. Character Sally Calypso was also homage to 2000 AD strip Halo Jones, which featured a similar character named Swifty Frisko.

== Pseudonyms and cameos ==
Occasionally real life creators and individuals pop up in disguise.

=== Pseudonyms ===
Some work in 2000 AD has been done by people using pseudonyms to prevent readers from guessing that their series were connected, when writing stories where the connection was to be a surprise:

- Cal Hamilton – Dan Abnett, first used the pseudonym when he did the initial run on James Bond Jr. (he then took over writing duties under his own name) and later resurrected it to disguise the fact that Malone tied into Sinister Dexter.
- Keef Ripley – John Wagner used the name when he wrote "The Dead Man" so that fans wouldn't guess it was actually a Judge Dredd story.
- G. Powell – Simon Spurrier used this name when he wrote "The Vort" so that fans wouldn't guess the disfigured character nicknamed 'Crispy' was in fact Lobster Random.

=== Cameos ===
People from the comics world, as well as public figures, have made cameo appearances within 2000 AD including:

- B.L.A.I.R. 1 was clearly based on British Prime Minister Tony Blair, as well as being a parody of early strip M.A.C.H. 1. Tony Blair is also parodied in Day of Chaos as mayoral candidate Tony Blore.
- Bill Clinton and Ronald Reagan have appeared in Judge Dredd and Strontium Dog, respectively. In Reagan's case, it was a significant multi-part story.
- Judge Cal's appearance was based on Pat Mills, and his persona was based on Caligula as shown in the popular I, Claudius.
- Judge Logan has appeared in a number of stories including the epic "Origins" and is named after W.R. Logan who started Class of '79.
- Kenny Who? is based on artist Cam Kennedy and his storylines (drawn by Kennedy) dealt with issues he encountered in the American comic industry. In the last Who? strip, robot versions of writer Alan Grant and his wife appear in the strip.
- The creator droids have appeared in several Tharg strips, intended to be specific creators (the comic pretends the real-life creators are robots).

== Timeline ==
Many of the 2000 AD crossovers are done via a timeline: characters and concepts appear in the past/future of other strips, and may time travel to each other. Listed in chronological order, these are:

c. 13.8 billion years BC

- The Big Bang.

c. 200 million years BC

- Big Hungry, a male Nothosaurus, terrorizes Atlantis, a Trans-Time station operating in the Triassic Period.

c. 65 million years BC

- Old One Eye, a female Tyrannosaurus, survives an attack by her son Satanus, killing him in the process.
- Disaster strikes as Flesh Base 3, a Trans-Time station operating in the late Cretaceous Period, is overrun by dinosaurs and other localized creatures.
- Thoth, son of the alien warlock Nemesis, releases the Satanus clone into the wild.

c. 20,000 years BC

- Earl Regan, an employee of Trans-Time Incorporated, helps thwart terrorist activity in the Quaternary Period.

793 Common Era

- Wulf Sternhammer, a Viking marauder, assists Search/Destroy Agent Johnny Alpha in capturing the Max Bubba gang.

Late 15th century

- Tomás de Torquemada, Grand Inquisitor of Spain, encounters his descendant from the far future, Torquemada. To avenge the murder of his own children by Nemesis, the Grand Master of Termight kills Thoth.

1945

- German Führer Adolf Hitler is detained by Search/Destroy agents Johnny Alpha and Wulf Sternhammer.

Late 1970s – late 1980s

- A reality breakdown occurs.

1978

- A defective pesticide causes Brazilian ants to grow to giant size. They attack both Brazil and Argentina before being destroyed.

1980s

- The Scottish oil boom.

1987

- U.S. President Ronald Reagan, having been kidnapped by Kaiakos-K guerrillas, is rescued by Search/Destroy agents Johnny Alpha and Durham Red. Humanity has its first encounter with the Predator.

1990

- A nuclear accident melts the Arctic Ice Cap, submerging much of Britain (and presumably other countries). The flood waters recede after a few weeks. A second Predator attacks New York.

1999

- The Volgan occupation of Britain begins. The Royal Family, among it King Charles III, is evacuated to Canada.

2010

- Construction begins of the Trans-Atlantic Tunnel.

2014

- Mr. Moonie begins his exploration of the Moon.

2031

- Chief Judge Fargo creates his elite force of street judges to bring instant justice to America, without due process.

c. 2040s

- Satanus, the first dinosaur to be cloned from surviving Tyrannosaurus DNA, hatches from a surrogate alligator egg.

2050

- Aeroball, a combination of football, kung fu, and basketball, is increasingly one of the world's most popular sports.
- John 'Giant' Clay is born.

c. 2050s

- Golgotha, son of Satanus, hatches.

Mid 21st century

- Mek-troops start replacing human combatants.

2061

- The Triumvirate, comprising Mega-Cities One, Two, and Three, signs the Lunar Treaty.

Mid 21st century

- The Volgan conflict ends.
- A select squad of mek-troops, led by veteran war droid Hammerstein, is sent to Mars.

2065

- The first dinosaur park opens in Colorado. Satanus, its star attraction, goes on a killing rampage.

2066

- The first batch of accelerated cloned births, taken from reverend justices, is born. Rico and Joe Dredd, cloned from Chief Judge Eustace Fargo, are among those born as five-year-old children to expedite their enrollment at the Academy of Law.

2070

- U.S. President Robert L. ('Smooth') Booth initiates the Atomic Wars. International laser defense systems prevent direct nuclear attack on the majority of megalopolized areas throughout the world. The peoples of the United States of America depose President Booth and petition the Judges to assume full administration of the country. President Booth is placed in suspended animation by order of an emergency Grand Council of Judges. Mek-troops still loyal to the National Executive, among them veteran war droid Hammerstein, engage in a battle of supremacy with the National Judiciary.

2071

- The mek-troops comprising Booth's Presidential Guard are defeated by the Judges in the Battle of Armageddon.

c. 2070s

- The Hiroshima Accord is settled by Mega-Cities One, Two, and Three of North America; Brit-Cit, East-Megs One and Two, and Hondo City of Eurasia; New Jerusalem and Simba City of Pan-Africa; Sydney–Melbourne Conurbation and Friendly City of Oceania; and the Arctic Sector of Laurasia.
- Chief Judge Fargo, despite strong opposition from Council member Morton Judd, vetoes against eugenics proposals for population control.

2070s

- Having made it through the preliminary rounds of the World Aeroball Championship, the Harlem Heroes' team bus crashes, killing all but four players. Louis Mayer, his brain alone surviving the tragedy, convinces his three fellow survivors, 'Slim', 'Hairy', and team captain John 'Giant' Clay that they can still win the championship title.

2078

- The Harlem Heroes reforms as the Harlem Hellcats, contesting an Inferno tournament, one of a rising tide of legalized death sports.

2070s

- Hammerstein, an off-line war droid loyal to the National Executive, is reactivated in the Cursed Earth. Resolving to find new purpose now that he is no longer at war with the Judges, Hammerstein enters Mega-City One.

2079

- Rico and Joe Dredd graduate with honors as full-eagle Judges two years early.
- Rico Dredd, found guilty of corruption, is sentenced by his brother Joe to twenty years penal servitude on the Judges' Titan prison colony.

2080

- Ro-Busters (Disasters) Limited goes into liquidation.
- Cassandra Anderson is born.

Late 21st century

- Civil war breaks out between Mega-Cities One and Three.

2099
Judge Dredd – first appearance: Prog 2

- Judge Dredd was 2000 AD's first venture into shared universe territory by way of its introduction of Judge Giant senior, the son of former aeroball star John 'Giant' Clay. Cadet Giant graduates from the Academy of Law.
- The people of Mega-City One honor the Judges by unveiling the towering Statue of Judgement.
- A robot rebellion led by Call-Me-Kenneth, The Robot Wars, brings large-scale destruction to Mega-City One before finally being quelled by the Judges.
- Rico Dredd, returning from his penal servitude on Titan, is killed during a showdown with his brother Joe.

2100

- A deadly plague threatens the very existence of Mega-City Two. A mission led by Judge Dredd to carry the antidote across the Cursed Earth from Mega-City One is successful. During the expedition, Dredd encounters the Satanus clone and releases the former U.S. President Robert L. Booth from suspended animation allowing him to join a local Cursed Earth farming community.

2103

- A defunct war droid excavated from the Cursed Earth reactivates and terrorizes the Andy Warhol Block in Mega-City One.

2104

- Judge Giant is killed by Orlok, a Soviet assassin.
- Supreme Judge Bulgarin of East-Meg One initiates the Apocalypse War, devastating Mega-City One and killing half of its population. Ultimately, the invaders are repelled but Chief Judge Griffin is killed during the conflict. Judge McGruder, head of the SJS, is appointed as successor.

2105

- The illegitimate son of Judge Giant and Adelle Dormer is inducted into the Academy of Law.

2106

- Mega-City One's Tek-Division develops Proteus, its first operational time machine.
- Trekmaster Lucas Rudd leads twenty-eight radwagons through the Cursed Earth to the New Territories. Of the one hundred and eleven helltrekkers who set out from Mega-City One only sixteen survive the twelve-day journey.

2109

- A terrorist faction naming itself after the Harlem Heroes escapes from its subterranean penal colony.

2110

- Jug MacKenzie wins Supersuf 10, the first legal World Skyboarding Championship.

2112

- Judge Death takes control of Mega-City One and kills 60 million people.

2114

- Sabbat, a necromagus from the year 2178, raises a vast army of zombies worldwide. A select group of international Judges, assisted by Search/Destroy agent Johnny Alpha, unites in defeating him although a number of megalopolized areas, including Mega-City Two, are destroyed in the process.

2121

- Second Robot War in Mega-City One.

2126

- John 'Giant' Clay dies.

2134

- Most of the population of Mega-City One are killed by terrorists using a weaponised disease.

2180 – mid-2180s
Strontium Dog – first appearance: Starzine 1 (StarLord)/Prog 86 (2000 AD)

- Durham Red: – a spin-off from Strontium Dog. First appearance of series: Prog 762

23rd century

- Trans-Time Incorporated are in operation harvesting dinosaurs from 65 million years BC.

unconfirmed
Rogue Trooper – first appearance: Prog 228

- Unlike most standalone strips that now form part of 2000 AD's shared universe, Strontium Dog and Rogue Trooper are late inclusions. In both cases, the main characters of these two strips have made their shared universe début in Judge Dredd.

the far future
Durham Red (later series) – first appearance in far future: Prog 1078

the far future
Comic Rock – first appearance: Prog 167

the far future
Nemesis the Warlock – first appearance: Prog 222

the far future/21st century
ABC Warriors [second series] – first appearance: Prog 555

- Nemesis the Warlock is a continuation of Comic Rock that features cameos by Ro-Jaws, Hammerstein, and Mek-Quake. Nemesis later reforms the ABC Warriors as a time-traveling unit.
