= Gina Hart =

British comics artist

- Areas: Artist, Colorist
- Notable works: Rupert Bear

Gina Hart is a British comics artist best known for her coloring work on the Rupert Bear strips. Hart enjoys close links with the fan community.

She has also worked for 2000 AD, colouring strips by artists such as John Ridgway and Simon Coleby. She has also worked on the Rogue Trooper strip and on Marvel UK titles like Transformers.
