= Friday (2000 AD) =

Comics character

Character information
- First appearance: 2000 AD #650 (October 1989) (1989)
- Created by: Dave Gibbons

Publication information
- Publisher: Fleetway
- Schedule: Weekly
- Title(s): Numerous
- Formats: Original material for the series has been published as a strip in the comics anthology(s) 2000 AD.
- Genre: Military science fiction
- Publication date: 1989–1996
- Main character(s): Friday; Venus Bluegenes

Creative team
- Writer(s): Dave Gibbons; Michael Fleisher; Steve White; Mark Millar; Dan Abnett
- Artist(s): Will Simpson; Ron Smith; Simon Coleby; Chris Weston; Henry Flint; Steve Tappin

Friday is a comics character who appeared in the British anthology 2000 AD between 1989 and 1996. He was created by writer Dave Gibbons and artist Will Simpson. Subsequently Michael Fleisher and then Steve White took over as regular series writers. Friday was the lead character of the new Rogue Trooper series, which was a reboot of the original 1981 series, of which Gibbons had been the creator artist (with writer Gerry Finley-Day).

Like the original Rogue Trooper, Friday is a Genetic Infantryman – a clone soldier genetically-engineered to survive in a toxic environment in which normal people require chemical-warfare suits and gas masks – fighting on the planet Nu-Earth.

In 1995 the original Rogue Trooper briefly appeared alongside Friday in the new series. (See also 2000 AD crossovers#Rogue Trooper.)

== Publication history ==
On the strength of Watchmen, the editorial staff of 2000 AD asked Dave Gibbons if he would be interested in redesigning the Rogue Trooper character. Gibbons accepted and proposed also writing it, which was greenlit by Richard Burton. However, time commitments would not allow him to both write it and provide the stories art and Will Simpson was brought in to cover the art duties. Gibbons says the redesign "was my chance to put everything into Rogue Trooper I wanted and take out all the crap, like the bio-chips"

The fourteen-part story was hit by scheduling problems due to the lateness of the art. Gibbons said "I'm still quite happy with the story, although the way it was serialised was erratic - in for two issues, then out again. I was trying to have something that was quite cumulative." Michael Fleisher took over the writing of the series with artists Ron Smith, Simon Coleby and Chris Weston. Editor Alan McKenzie has declared about the new writer: "on paper Fleisher was a good bet. ... But his work on 2000 AD was embarrassing. I did my best to save it, but you can't polish a turd."

After five stories Steve White was brought in to help address some problems. According to editor John Tomlinson "Ever since "War Machine" in 1989, readers had been confused as hell about who is Friday and whether he was the original Rogue. I told Steve to figure that out and explain it." This led to a two-year-long run on the series for the writer, although there was a move to hand the series to Mark Millar which only resulted in a three-part story. During this period Friday met both Judge Dredd, in an issue-length story, and later the original Rogue Trooper, the latter being intended to settle the issue of their origins and connections. Unfortunately, according to Tomlinson "Steve came up with a fairly watertight explanation, but it was enormously complicated and probably confused far more people than it enlightened." That story also brought in Venus Bluegenes, a G.I. Doll, who would appear in one more story before her appearance in the final story to feature Friday. Dan Abnett, co-author for that story, was complimentary of White's work, "Steve had such a great feel for military goings on," however, this couldn't overcome intrinsic problems with the story as "he was absolutely hamstrung by the weight of continuity." In the final story in 1996, Friday and Venus disappeared into a black hole and have not reappeared since. Subsequent Rogue Trooper stories have all featured the original version of the character (except for a non-canonical one-off story in 2024).

== Characters ==
Friday's adventures are a retcon of the Rogue Trooper storyline. Since all the G.I.s were identical and had serial numbers instead of names, they gave each other descriptive nicknames to tell each other apart.

- Friday (G.I. #19) is equivalent to Rogue. He seems to be less dogmatic and is stronger-willed than the other G.I.s.
- Top (G.I. #01), the G.I. company sergeant and field-radioman, is equivalent to Helm. He has an upgraded version of the standard issue G.I. helmet with improved sensors, increased communications range and multiple channels.
- Eightball (G.I. #08), the unit sniper, is equivalent to Gunnar. He has a rifle with enhanced sensors and a more powerful electronic sight.
- Lucky (G.I. #13), the unit Equipment Man, is equivalent to Bagman. He has a Backpack with extra equipment, including Caustic Foam Dispensers and over-the-shoulder lighting mechanism.

== Bibliography ==
- Rogue Trooper:
  - "The War Machine" (by Dave Gibbons and Will Simpson, in 2000 AD #650-653, 667-671, 683-687, 1989–1990)
  - "Decoys" (by Michael Fleisher and Chris Weston, in Rogue Trooper Annual 1991, 1990)
  - "Marching As To War" (text story by John Smith, in Rogue Trooper Annual 1991, 1990)
  - "The Undeath Project" (by Michael Fleisher and Smith & Tim Perkins, in Rogue Trooper Annual 1991, 1990)
  - "Bio-Death" (by Michael Fleisher and Steve Dillon, in Rogue Trooper Annual 1991, 1990)
  - "Circus Daze" (by Michael Fleisher and John Hicklenton, in Rogue Trooper Annual 1991, 1990)
  - "Golden Fox Rebellion" (by Michael Fleisher and Ron Smith, in 2000 AD #712-723, 1991)
  - "Saharan Ice Belt War" (by Michael Fleisher and Simon Coleby, in 2000 AD #730-741, 1991)
  - "Hollow Town" (by John Smith, art by Simon Coleby, in 2000 AD Sci-Fi Special, 1991)
  - "The Arena Of Long Knives" (by Michael Fleisher and Kev Walker, in 2000 AD Yearbook 1992, 1991)
  - "Apocalypse Dreadnought" (by Michael Fleisher and Ron Smith, in 2000 AD #780-791, 1992)
  - "House of Pain" (written by Mark Millar, art by Brett Ewins & Jim McCarthy, in 2000 AD Sci-Fi Special, 1992)
  - "Enfleshings" (by John Smith and Chris Weston, in 2000 AD Yearbook 1993, 1992)
  - "Shock Tactics" (written by John Smith, art by Chris Weston & Mike Hadley, in 2000 AD Sci-Fi Special, 1993)
  - "Give War a Chance" (by Mark Millar and David Hill, in 2000 AD Yearbook 1994, 1993)
  - "Scavenger of Souls Prologue" (by Michael Fleisher and Simon Coleby, in 2000 AD #850-851, 1993)
  - "Scavenger of Souls" (by Michael Fleisher and Chris Weston, in 2000 AD #873-880, 1994)
  - "Hill 392" (by Steve White and Chris Weston & Gina Hart, in Rogue Trooper Poster Prog #1, 1994)
  - "Mercy Killing" (by Steve White and Henry Flint, in 2000 AD #889-891, 1994)
  - "Some Mother's Son" (by Steve White and Henry Flint, in 2000AD Sci-Fi Special, 1994)
  - "Mercenary Attitudes" (by Steve White and Henry Flint, in 2000 AD #896-899, 1994)
  - "Danger Drop" (by Steve White and Adrian Lutton, 2000AD Yearbook 1995, 1994)
- Judge Dredd: "Casualties Of War" (by John Wagner and John Higgins, in 2000 AD #900, 1994)
- Rogue Trooper:
  - "G.I. Blues" (by Mark Millar and Chris Weston, in 2000 AD #901-903, 1994)
  - "Blue on Blue" (by Steve White and Henry Flint, in 2000 AD #928-931, 1995)
  - "Mind Bombs" (by Steve White and Edmund Bagwell (credited as Edmund Perryman) & Nick Abadzis, in 2000 AD #937-939, 1995)
  - "Ascent" (by Steve White and Steve Tappin, in 2000 AD #946-949, 1995)
  - "Angels" (by Steve White and Charlie Adlard, in 2000 AD #950-952, 1995)
  - "Descent" (by Steve White and Steve Tappin, in 2000 AD #964-966, 1995)
  - "Combat Rocks" (by Steve White and Steve Tappin, in 2000 AD #967-970, 1995)
  - "A Night Out with the Boys" (by Steve White and Steve Tappin, in 2000AD Sci-Fi Special, 1995)
  - "Hot Metal" (by Steve White and Steve Tappin, in 2000 AD #983-986, 1996)
  - "Street Fighting Man" (by Steve White and Steve Tappin, in 2000 AD #987-989, 1996)
  - "Gaia" (by Steve White and Dougie Braithwaite, in Rogue Trooper Action Special, 1996)
  - "Shakedown" (by Steve White and Steve Tappin, in Rogue Trooper Action Special, 1996)
  - "Collateral" (by Steve White and Steve Tappin, in 2000 AD #1007-1009, 1996)
  - "Rogue Alone" (by Steve White and Calum Alexander Watt, in 2000 AD #1010-1013, 1996)
  - "Rogue Troopers" (by Dan Abnett & Steve White and Alex Ronald, in 2000 AD #1014-1022, 1996)
- Rogue / Dog (by James Peaty and Nicolo Assirelli & Jack Davies, in 2000 AD Sci-Fi Special, 2024)

== See also ==
Other Genetic Infantrymen (and women) with prominent roles:

- Rogue
- Venus Bluegenes
- Tor Cyan
- Rafe
