= Steve White (comics) =

British comic book writer (born 1964)

- Born: 27 May 1964 (age 62)
- Areas: Writer, Editor, Colourist
- Notable works: Rogue Trooper (Friday)

Steve White is a British comic book writer, paleoartist, and occasional colourist who has mainly worked with 2000 AD.

== Career ==
White's career in comics began in the 1980s at Marvel UK in London, where he worked in various roles on titles like The Real Ghostbusters, Transformers, Dragon's Claws, Knights of Pendragon and The Sleaze Brothers. He has co-authored work with Dan Abnett, of Majestic fame.

He is currently a senior editor for Titan Magazines comics, overseeing popular licenses such as Wallace & Gromit, Shaun the Sheep, The Simpsons Comics, Transformers and Star Wars. He was previously a graphic novels editor for Titan Books.

White is also a talented illustrator, specialising in drawing dinosaurs. Illustration credits include Dinosaurs: A Celebration (Marvel, 1997), and he has edited and published several newer books about palaeoart.

== Bibliography ==
=== Comics ===
- Judge Dredd: "The Juve Mutated Kung Fu Kleggs" (with Dermot Power, 2000AD Sci-Fi Special 1991)
- Rogue Trooper (rebooted series):
  - "Hill 392" (with Chris Weston, in Poster Prog Rogue Trooper #1, 1994)
  - "Mercy Killing" (with Henry Flint, in 2000 AD #889-891, 1994)
  - "Some Mother's Son" (with Henry Flint, in 2000AD Sci-Fi Special 1994)
  - "Mercenary Attitudes" (with Henry Flint, in 2000 AD #896-899, 1994)
  - "Blue on Blue" (with Henry Flint, in 2000 AD #928-931, 1995)
  - "Mind Bombs" (with Edmund Perryman/Nick Abadzis, in 2000 AD #937-939, 1995)
  - "Ascent" (with Steve Tappin, in 2000 AD #946-949, 1995)
  - "A Night Out with the Boys" (with Steve Tappin, in 2000AD Sci-Fi Special 1995)
  - "Angels" (with Charlie Adlard, in 2000 AD #950-952, 1995)
  - "Danger Drop" (with Adrian Lutton, 2000AD Yearbook 1995)
  - "Descent" (with Steve Tappin, in 2000 AD #964-966, 1995)
  - "Combat Rocks" (with Steve Tappin, in 2000 AD #967-970, 1995)
  - "Hot Metal" (with Steve Tappin, in 2000 AD #983-986, 1996)
  - "Street Fighting Man" (with Steve Tappin, in 2000 AD #987-989, 1996)
  - "Gaia" (with Dougie Braithwaite, in Rogue Trooper Action Special, 1996)
  - "Shakedown" (with Steve Tappin, in Rogue Trooper Action Special, 1996)
  - "Collateral" (with Steve Tappin, in 2000 AD #1007-1009, 1996)
  - "Rogue Alone" (with Calum Alexander Watt, in 2000 AD #1010-1013, 1996)
  - "Rogue Troopers" (with Dan Abnett and Alex Ronald, in 2000 AD #1014-1022, 1996)
- Urban Strike (with co-author Anthony Williams and art by Mick Austin, in 2000 AD #950-955, 1995)
- Flesh: "Chronocide" (with Dan Abnett and Gary Erskine, in 2000 AD #973-979, 1996)
- Venus Bluegenes:
  - "Bitchin'!" (with Simon Coleby, in 2000AD Winter Special 1995)
  - "Stealth" (with Henry Flint, in 2000 AD #980-982, 1996)
- Black Light (with co-writer Dan Abnett):
  - "Survivor Syndrome" (with John Burns, in 2000 AD #1001-1005, 1996)
  - "Lords of Creation" (with Lee Sullivan, in 2000 AD #1006-1009, 1996)
  - "Pandora's Box" (with Steve Yeowell, in 2000 AD #1010-1013, 1996)
- Vector 13:
  - "Case One: Devil in the Deep Blue Sea" (with Henry Flint, in 2000 AD #1024, 1997)
  - "Case Four: Bad Moon Rising" (with Amanda Fletcher, in 2000 AD #1027, 1997)
  - "Case Seven: Night of the Jaguar" (with Marc Wigmore, in 2000 AD #1068, 1997)
- Lords of Misrule (with co-authors John Tomlinson and Dan Abnett, with art by Peter Snejbjerg, Dark Horse, 1997, black and white softcover, 200 pages, Dark Horse, 1999, ISBN 1-56971-352-9, hardcover, Radical Comics, 264 pages, June 2009, ISBN 0-9802335-8-5)
- HyperSonic (with co-author Dan Abnett and art by Gary Erskine, Dark Horse, 1997–1998)
- Osprey Graphic History (with Gary Erskine and Richard Elson):
  - The Empire Falls: Battle of Midway (with Richard Elson, 48 pages, October 2006, ISBN 1-84603-058-7)
  - Day of Infamy: Attack on Pearl Harbor (with Jerrold Spahn, 48 pages, February 2007, ISBN 1-84603-059-5)

=== Books ===
- Titan Publishing Group
  - Dinosaur Art: The World's Greatest Paleoart (188 pages, September 2012, ISBN 978-0857685841)
  - The Paleoart of Julius Csotonyi (with Julius Csotonyi, 156 pages, May 2014, ISBN 978-1781169124)
  - Dinosaur Art II: The Cutting Edge of Paleoart (188 pages, October 2017, ISBN 978-1785653988)
- Bloomsbury Publishing plc
  - Mesozoic Art: Dinosaurs and Other Ancient Animals in Art (with Darren Naish, 208 pages, October 2022, ISBN 978-1399401388)
  - Mesozoic Art II: Dinosaurs and Other Ancient Animals in Art (with Darren Naish, 256 pages, September 2025, ISBN 978-1399412216)
