= Jaegir =

British sci-fi comic strip created 2014

- The Beast Within, the first collected edition of Jaegir.

Character information
- First appearance: 2000 AD Prog 1874 (2014)
- Created by: Gordon Rennie; Simon Coleby

In-story information
- Full name: Kapitan-Inspector Atalia Jaegir
- Team affiliations: Nordland State Security Police
- Partnerships: Klaur, Reesa, and Heize

Publication information
- Publisher: Rebellion Developments
Title(s)
Numerous
- Formats: Original material for the series has been published as a strip in the comics anthology(s) 2000 AD.
- Genre: Military science fiction
- Publication date: 2014 – Present

Creative team
- Writer(s): Gordon Rennie
- Artist(s): Simon Coleby
- Editor(s): Tharg; Matt Smith

Reprints
- Collected editions
- The Beast Within: ISBN 1-781083-96-7

Jaegir is a science fiction strip in the British comic 2000 AD, created by writer Gordon Rennie and artist Simon Coleby. It follows the adventures of Kapitan-Inspector Atalia Jaegir, who serves in the Nordland State Security Police.

== Publication history ==
Jaegir is a spin-off of Rogue Trooper, and was created by writer Gordon Rennie and artist Simon Coleby. Rennie wished to explore the Norts who he felt were underdeveloped in the Rogue Trooper series. Rennie initially pitched Jaegir as a man named Armand Jaegir, and late in the process he decided it would be much more interesting to have a female protagonist with a new personal history. Jaegir first appeared in 2000 AD in Prog 1874 (March 26, 2014) in a six-part story entitled Strigoi exploring the unsuccessful attempts to genetically engineer prominent Nort families.

== Plot synopsis ==
Set in the future, an ongoing war between the Norts and Southers is being fought. During the conflict, many forms of chemical and biological weapons have been used, poisoning many of the soldiers and the planets. Kapitan-Inspector Atalia Jaegir is a Nort whose role is to hunt down escaped Nort war criminals.

== Bibliography ==
Year(s)	Title	Progs	Notes
2014	Strigoi	#1874–1879	Six-part story, introduces Kapiten-Inspector Atalia Jaegir, and the 'Strigoi taint'.
2014	Circe	#1893–1898	Six-part story, where Jaegir confronts the remnants of the Quartz Zone massacre.
2014	Brothers in Arms	Christmas Special	One-part story, where Jaegir reflects on her childhood and her brother Leo.
2015	Tartarus	#1937–1944	Eight-part story, where Jaegir investigates the treatment of Souther prisoners-of-war.
2016	Warchild	#1996–1999	Four-part story, where Field Marshal Jaegir asks his daughter to protect him from the Nord state.
2016–2017	Hunted	#2001–2009	Nine-part story, centres on Rogue Trooper, featuring a young Atalia Jaegir in a supporting role.
2018	In the Realm Of Pyrrhus	#2073–2078	Six-part story, where Jaegir and her team are sent on a top secret mission to Nu Earth.
2019	Bonegrinder	#2117–2122	Six-part story, where Jaegir takes command of a base under relentless attack by Southers. Ends on a cliffhanger.
2019	Valkyrie	#2144–2149	Six-part story, continuing Bonegrinder.
2021	The Path of Kali	#2247–2249	Three-part story, continuing Valkyrie.
2022	Ferox	#2291–2299	Eight-part story, Continuing The Path of Kali.

=== Collected editions ===
- Jaegir: The Beast Within collects "Strigoi", "Circe", "Brothers in Arms" and "Tartarus" (released September 2015).
