= Michael Fleisher =

American comic writer

- Born: Michael L. Fleisher; November 1, 1942
- Died: February 2, 2018 (aged 75)
- Area: Writer
- Notable works: Jonah Hex, Spectre

Michael Lawrence Fleisher (November 1, 1942 — February 2, 2018) was an American writer known for his DC Comics of the 1970s and 1980s, particularly for the characters Spectre and Jonah Hex.

== Biography ==
=== Early life and career ===
Fleisher was raised in New York City. His parents divorced when he was four years old, and Fleisher developed the foundation of his later Western writing by spending Saturdays with his visiting father at Western movie double features. "I saw two Westerns every Saturday for years," Fleisher recalled in 2010. "So it wasn't very hard to write [Westerns] at all."

Fleisher wrote three volumes of The Encyclopedia of Comic Books Heroes, doing some research on-site at DC Comics. He started comic book scripting in 1972, co-writing with Lynn Marron the full-issue supernatural story "Death at Castle Dunbar" in DC's Secrets of Sinister House #5 (July 1972). He co-wrote supernatural short stories with Maxene Fabe in DC's House of Mystery, and a solo story in the companion title House of Secrets #111 (Sept. 1973). Collaborating with Russell Carley, who provided art breakdowns for Fleisher's scripts, Fleisher wrote seven stories for those titles and Forbidden Tales of Dark Mansion late in 1973. Fleisher scripted the Steve Ditko–created Shade, the Changing Man series in 1977–1978. Fleisher made several contributions to the Batman mythos in the early 1980s. He reintroduced the Crime Doctor in Detective Comics #494 (Sept. 1980), co-created the Electrocutioner in Batman #331 (Jan. 1981), and wrote the origin of the Penguin in The Best of DC #10 (March 1981).

=== The Spectre ===
After becoming, variously, an assistant editor and an associate editor under Joe Orlando on the DC humor series Plop! and the superhero anthology series Adventure Comics, Fleisher, with Carley's script-breakdown assistance, began writing the feature "The Spectre" in the latter title. Beginning with the 12-page "The Wrath of ... the Spectre" in issue #431 (Feb. 1974), Fleisher and artist Jim Aparo went on to produce 10 stories of the supernatural avenger through issue #440 (July 1975) (without Carley's assistance toward the end) that became controversial for what was considered gruesome, albeit bloodless, violence. As comics historian Les Daniels observed, the character, created during the 1940s Golden Age and briefly revived in the late 1960s,

... got a new lease on life after Orlando was mugged and decided the world needed a really relentless super hero. The character came back with a vengeance ... and quickly became a cause of controversy. Orlando plotted the stories with writer Michael Fleisher, and they emphasized the gruesome fates of criminals who ran afoul of the Spectre. The Comics Code had recently been liberalized, but this series pushed its restrictions to the limit, often by turning evildoers into inanimate objects and then thoroughly demolishing them. Jim Aparo's art showed criminals being transformed into everything from broken glass to melting candles, but Fleisher was quick to point out that many of his most bizarre plot devices were lifted from stories published decades earlier."

=== Jonah Hex ===
Fleisher wrote DC Comics' Jonah Hex character for more than a dozen years, beginning in 1974 in Weird Western Tales (taking over from the character's creator, John Albano), then from 1977 to 1985 in the character's self-titled comic. A sequel series, Hex (1985–1987) transported the character into a postapocalyptic setting, making him the lead in a science-fiction feature.

=== Harlan Ellison lawsuit ===
Writer Harlan Ellison in a 1979 interview praised Fleisher's comics work, while also describing Fleisher and his work as "crazy", "certifiable", "twisted", "derange-o", "bugfuck", and a "lunatic". He also claimed that a Publishers Weekly review called Fleisher's novel Chasing Hairy "the product of a sick mind", and that Fleisher's Spectre run on Adventure Comics had been discontinued by DC Comics because the company "realized they had turned loose a lunatic on the world." While Ellison stated that some of what he was claiming was said "in some humor", Fleisher, saying his "business reputation has been destroyed" and believing he was falsely portrayed as insane, filed a $2 million libel suit against Ellison, publisher Gary Groth and the magazine in which the interview appeared, The Comics Journal. The case came to court in 1986 and resulted in a verdict for the defendants.

=== Later career ===
Fleisher attended college at Columbia University in New York City, from 1987 to 1991, while also writing for the British comics magazine 2000 AD. Leaving the comics field that year, he moved to Ann Arbor, Michigan for graduate school at the University of Michigan, spending from 1994 to 1996 researching his Ph.D. thesis on commercialized cattle theft in Tanzania while living for two years near Nairobi. He then spent a year in New York writing his dissertation and earned a doctorate in anthropology. After that, he worked as a "freelance anthropological consultant carrying out research assignments for humanitarian organizations in the developing world." Fleisher died from complications of Alzheimer's disease in Beaverton, Oregon on February 2, 2018.

== Bibliography ==
=== Books ===
- The Encyclopedia of Comic Book Heroes Volume One: Batman (Collier Books, 1976, ISBN 0-02-080090-8) (DC Comics, 2007, ISBN 978-1-4012-1355-8)
- The Encyclopedia of Comic Book Heroes Volume Two: Wonder Woman (Collier Books, 1976, ISBN 0-02-080080-0) (DC Comics, 2007, ISBN 978-1-4012-1365-7)
- The Encyclopedia of Comic Book Heroes Volume Three: Superman (a.k.a. The Great Superman Book: The Complete Encyclopedia of the Folk Hero of America (Warner Books, 1978, hardback ISBN 0-517-53677-3, paperback ISBN 0-446-87494-9) (DC Comics, 2007, ISBN 978-1-4012-1389-3)
- Chasing Hairy (St. Martin's Press, 1979, ISBN 0-312-13139-9)
- Kuria Cattle Raiders: Violence and Vigilantism on the Tanzania/Kenya Frontier (University of Michigan Press, 2000, hardback ISBN 0-472-11152-3, paperback 0-472-08698-8)
- Shambler: An Insider's Novel of the Comic Book World (iUniverse, 2008) ISBN 0-595-48071-3, ISBN 978-0-595-48071-5

=== Comic books ===
==== Atlas/Seaboard Comics ====
- The Brute #1–2 (1975)
- The Grim Ghost #1–2 (1975)
- Ironjaw #1–3 (1975)
- Morlock 2001 #1–2 (1975)
- Weird Suspense featuring The Tarantula #1–2 (1975)

==== DC Comics ====
- 1st Issue Special #7 (Creeper) (1975)
- Advanced Dungeons and Dragons #1–4 (1988–1989)
- Adventure Comics #431–440 (Spectre) (1974–1975)
- Batman #265, 331 (1975–1981)
- The Best of DC #10, 22 (1981–1982)
- The Brave and the Bold #166, 180 (1980–1981)
- Cancelled Comic Cavalcade #2 (1978)
- DC Special Series #16, 21 (1978–1980)
- Detective Comics #494-496 (1980)
- Elvira's House of Mystery Special #1 (1987)
- Forbidden Tales of Dark Mansion #13–15 (1973–1974)
- Haywire #1–13 (1988–1989)
- Heroes Against Hunger #1 (1986)
- Hex #1–18 (1985–1987)
- House of Mystery #205, 210, 212, 215, 218–222, 224–225, 227–228, 230, 233–234, 237, 239, 242, 246, 249, 253–254, 256 (1972–1978)
- House of Secrets #111–112, 114, 118–119, 123, 128–129, 131–133, 135, 145 (1973–1977)
- Jonah Hex #1–12, 16–92 (1977–1985)
- Justice League of America #242 (M.A.S.K. insert preview) (1985)
- Little Shop of Horrors #1 (1986)
- M.A.S.K. #1–4 (1985–1986)
- M.A.S.K. vol. 2 #1–9 (1987)
- Phantom Stranger vol. 2 #32, 38–41 (1974–1976)
- Power Lords #1–3 (1983–1984)
- Sandman #2–6 (1975–1976)
- Secret Origins vol. 2 #16 (The Warlord), #21 (Jonah Hex) (1987)
- Secrets of Haunted House #13 (1978)
- Secrets of Sinister House #5, 14–15 (1972–1973)
- Shade, the Changing Man #1–8 (1977–1978)
- Sinister House of Secret Love #4 (1972)
- Spiral Zone #1–4 (1988)
- Star Trek #38 (1987)
- Time Warp #1 (1979)
- The Unexpected #152 (1973)
- The Warlord #100–133, Annual #5–6 (1985–1988)
- Weird Mystery Tales #10, 15, 22–24 (1974–1975)
- Weird War Tales #41, 88, 102 (1975–1981)
- Weird Western Tales #22–44, 59 (1974–1979)
- The Witching Hour #44 (1974)
- Wrath of the Spectre #4 (1988)

==== 2000AD ====
- Junker (with John Ridgway)
  - "Junker Part 1" (in 2000 AD #708-716, 1990–1991)
  - "Junker Part 2" (in 2000 AD #724-730, 1991)
- Rogue Trooper: "The Arena of Long Knives" (with Kev Walker, in 2000 AD Yearbook 1992, 1991)
- Rogue Trooper (Friday):
  - "Circus Daze" (with John Hicklenton, "Decoys" with Chris Weston, "The Undeath Project" with Ron Smith & Tim Perkins, Bio-Death" with Steve Dillon in Rogue Trooper Annual 1991, 1990)
  - "Golden Fox Rebellion" (with Ron Smith, in 2000 AD #712-723, 1991)
  - "Saharan Ice Belt War" (with Simon Coleby, in 2000 AD #730-741, 1991)
  - "Apocalypse Dreadnought" (with Ron Smith, in 2000 AD #780-791, 1992)
  - "Scavenger of Souls Prologue" (with Simon Coleby, in 2000 AD #850-851, 1993)
  - "Scavenger of Souls" (with Chris Weston, in 2000 AD #873-880, 1994)
- Harlem Heroes in 2000 AD 671–676, 683–699, 701–705, 745–749, 776–779 and 928-939 with Steve Dillon and Kev Walker, Geoff Senior, Ron Smith, Kev Hopgood, Stewart Johnson and Siku

==== Marvel Comics ====
- The Amazing Spider-Man #220 (1981)
- Captain America #236 (1979)
- Conan the Barbarian #150–163, 165–171, 223, 225, Annual #9 (1983–1989)
- Daredevil #162 (1980)
- Ghost Rider #36–66 (1979–1982)
- G.I. Joe Special Missions #27 (1989)
- Man-Thing vol. 2 #1–3 (1979–1980)
- Marvel Fanfare #36 (1988)
- Marvel Super Special #21 (Conan the Barbarian), #35 (Conan the Destroyer) (1982–1984)
- Savage Sword of Conan #61–63, 65, 71, 73, 75–104, 106–109, 111–112 (1981–1985)
- Spider-Woman #21–32 (1979–1980)
- Star Trek #10 (1981)
- What If ... ? #28 (1981)

==== Warren Publishing ====
- Creepy #117, 123, 133, 135, 145 (1980–1983)
- Eerie #110 (1980)
- Vampirella #71, 77, 79, 85–86, 94, 112 (1978–1983)

=== Collections ===
- Wrath of the Spectre collects Adventure Comics #431–440, 200 pages, June 2005, ISBN 978-1401204747
- Showcase Presents Jonah Hex Volume 1 includes Weird Western Tales #22–33, 526 pages, November 2005, ISBN 978-1401207601
- Essential Spider-Woman
  - Volume 1 collects Marvel Spotlight #32, Marvel Two-In-One #29–33 and Spider-Woman #1–25, 576 pages, December 2005, ISBN 0-7851-1793-8
  - Volume 2 includes Spider-Woman #26–32, 608 pages, July 2007, ISBN 0-7851-2701-1
- The Chronicles of Conan
  - Volume 19: Deathmark and Other Stories collects Conan the Barbarian #150, 200 pages, June 2010, ISBN 978-1595825155
  - Volume 20: Night of the Wolf and Other Stories collects Conan the Barbarian #151-159, 200 pages, December 2010, ISBN 978-1595825841
  - Volume 21: Blood of the Titan and Other Stories collects Conan the Barbarian #160-162 and 164-167, 200 pages, August 2011, ISBN 978-1595827043
  - Volume 22: Reavers in the Borderland and Other Stories collects Conan the Barbarian #168-171 and Annual #9, 232 pages, June 2012, ISBN 978-1595828125
  - Volume 28: Blood and Ice and Other Stories collects Conan the Barbarian #223, 224 pages, November 2014, ISBN 978-1616553746
  - Volume 29: The Shape in the Shadow and Other Stories collects Conan the Barbarian #225, 224 pages, March 2015, ISBN 978-1616553753
- The Steve Ditko Omnibus Volume 1 collects Shade, the Changing Man #1–8 and Cancelled Comic Cavalcade #2, 480 pages, September 2011, ISBN 1-4012-3111-X
- The Spectre: The Wrath of the Spectre Omnibus collects Adventure Comics #431-440 and The Brave and the Bold #180, 680 pages, September 2020, ISBN 978-1779502933

Preceded by Sheldon Mayer	Adventure Comics writer 1974–1975	Succeeded by Paul Levitz and David Michelinie
Preceded by Jim Starlin	Ghost Rider writer 1979–1982	Succeeded by J. M. DeMatteis
Preceded by Mark Gruenwald	Spider-Woman writer 1979–1980	Succeeded by J. M. DeMatteis
Preceded by Roy Thomas	Savage Sword of Conan writer 1981–1985	Succeeded by Larry Yakata
Preceded by Bruce Jones	Conan the Barbarian writer 1983–1985	Succeeded by James C. Owsley
Preceded by Cary Burkett	The Warlord writer 1985–1988	Succeeded by n/a
