= Rogue Trooper (video game) =

2006 video game

- North American box art
- Developers: Rebellion Developments; TickTock Games (Redux)
- Publishers: Eidos Interactive; Reef Entertainment (Wii); Rebellion Developments (Redux)
- Series: 2000 AD
- Platforms: Microsoft Windows; PlayStation 2 Xbox; Wii; Nintendo Switch; PlayStation 4 Xbox One
- Release: Windows, PlayStation 2, Xbox: EU: 21 April 2006; NA: 23 May 2006; Wii: EU: 20 February 2009; NA: 4 December 2009; Redux; Windows, Switch, PlayStation 4, Xbox One: WW: 17 October 2017
- Genre: Third-person shooter
- Modes: Single-player, multiplayer

Rogue Trooper is a third-person shooter video game developed by Rebellion Developments and published by Eidos Interactive. It was released for Microsoft Windows, PlayStation 2 and Xbox in 2006. The Wii version, entitled Rogue Trooper: Quartz Zone Massacre, was released in 2009.

The game uses several story and plot elements from the original comic. This is the second game Rebellion Developments produced based on characters from the pages of 2000 AD; the first being Judge Dredd: Dredd vs. Death in 2003.

A remastered version of the game was released on 17 October 2017 for Microsoft Windows, PlayStation 4, Xbox One and Nintendo Switch, titled Rogue Trooper Redux.

== Story ==
The story is set on the planet Nu-Earth, which is caught in the gravitational forces of two suns and a black hole (used by Southers to warp into their space station high command), where a perpetual war between the Norts and Southers is being fought, in which millions have been killed. During the war all forms of chemical and biological weapons have been used, poisoning the planet, and the troops of both sides must live in enclosed cities and only venture into the outside if wearing protective gear known as a "bio-suit". The Southers have, through genetic engineering (done by the so-called "gene genies"), developed a race of warriors who are immune to the deadly atmosphere and will therefore be superior troops, the Genetic Infantry. All of the G.I.s were made immune to all toxins, diseases, and acids (except for one). The Souther High Command deploy their secret weapon in an airborne assault, but a traitor has betrayed the secret of the G.I.s to the Norts and they are massacred during the drop. This is known as the Quartz Zone Massacre.

Rogue, apparently the only surviving G.I. (until he meets Venus Bluegenes), goes AWOL in order to track down the Traitor General responsible and avenge the rest of the G.I.s. Along the way he thwarts numerous Nort schemes, destroys some of Nort-land's highest personnel, such as Grand Admiral Hoffa and Surgeon-Kapten Natashov.

All G.I.s possess a biochip implanted inside of the skull that contains their personality traits, memories and consciousness. After a G.I. dies his biochip can be inserted in a slot in another G.I's equipment or weapon, enabling him to control it. The biochip can later be placed into a new body, allowing the fallen G.I. to be reborn but they must be saved within 60 seconds after they died or their biochip will burnout killing the G.I. permanently. One quotation is "we're genetic infantry – even when we're dead we don't escape from war."

== Gameplay ==
The game is a third-person shooter. Rogue's primary arsenal are his pistol and assault rifle, with the latter being upgradeable throughout the course of the game. The rifle may be outfitted with a silencer at any time, or deployed as a sentry turret. As the game progresses the player unlocks the ability to outfit the rifle with a sniper attachment, a shotgun attachment, a cluster mortar attachment, an anti-aircraft rocket launcher, and an electric beam rifle. Other weapons include deployable micro mines, incendiary grenades, scrambler grenades, fragmentation and sticky grenades plus heavy machine gun posts and flak cannons scattered across the field with occasional use of lazooka rocket launchers and hell cannons.

Rogue's survival is ensured through clever use of the battlefield, which is generally rife with cover. He is able to fire while stationary, on the run, crouching, diving, and around the corner of any form of cover. Rogue also has the ability to unleash suppressive fire, which consumes a small amount of ammo and fires blindly from cover to intimidate enemies and cause them to find cover of their own. Enemies are highly susceptible to headshots, which will generally down them in a single strike. Another feature of gunplay is the ability to shoot an enemy soldier's air tank. Targeting the head displays a skull and crossbones, while targeting the gas tank shows a rectangular shape. Penetrating an air tank will cause enemies to run frantically and then explode, damaging any other enemies nearby.

Rogue may search fallen enemy and ally bodies to recover Salvage, the game's main resource, and a necessity for purchasing any of Bagman's supplies. Salvage is used to create all forms of ammunition and grenades, med-kits and arsenal upgrades. Scrap piles may also be found and looted for a considerable amount of Salvage.

Rogue Trooper supported online multiplayer via GameSpy servers on the PC/Playstation 2 versions and via Xbox Live on the original Xbox. There were several online gameplay modes, where gamers can experience up to four-player co-operative gameplay. The game also supports two player split screen.

== Reception ==
=== Rogue Trooper ===
Rogue Trooper

Aggregate score
Aggregator	Score			
Aggregator	PC	PS2	Wii	Xbox
Metacritic	69/100	71/100	70/100	71/100

Review scores
Publication	Score			
Publication	PC	PS2	Wii	Xbox
Edge	7/10	7/10	N/A	7/10
Electronic Gaming Monthly	N/A	7.33/10	N/A	7.33/10
Eurogamer	N/A	N/A	N/A	6/10
Game Informer	N/A	7.25/10	N/A	7.25/10
GamePro	2.5/5	2.5/5	N/A	2.5/5
GameSpot	6.7/10	6.7/10	N/A	6.7/10
GameSpy	N/A	3/5	N/A	3/5
GameTrailers	7.7/10	7.7/10	N/A	7.7/10
GameZone	N/A	8/10	N/A	8/10
IGN	8/10	8/10	N/A	8/10
Nintendo Life	N/A	N/A	8/10	N/A
Official U.S. PlayStation Magazine	N/A	4/5	N/A	N/A
Official Xbox Magazine (US)	N/A	N/A	N/A	7/10
PC Gamer (US)	73%	N/A	N/A	N/A
Detroit Free Press	2/4	2/4	N/A	2/4
The Times	4/5	4/5	N/A	4/5

Rogue Trooper and Rogue Trooper: Quartz Zone Massacre received average to positive reviews on all platforms according to the review aggregation website Metacritic.

The Times gave it a score of four stars out of five and called it "a third-person shooter with smooth, detailed graphics, and a learning curve set so beautifully that even non-shooter fans should love it." The A.V. Club gave it a B and said that it "doesn't approach the inventiveness of a great budget TPS like last year's Raze's Hell, but it's priced to move." However, The Sydney Morning Herald gave it a score of three stars out of five and said, "Where Rogue Trooper rescues itself from mediocrity ... is in the way it utilises Gunnar, Helm and Bagman. They all perk up with humorous quips and helpful advice, while the futuristic gadgetry is inventive." Detroit Free Press gave it two stars out of four and said it "feels more like basic training than hardcore warfare." Computer Games Magazine gave the PC version two-and-a-half stars out of five and said, "Everything about Rogue Trooper screams 'competent,' which doesn't amount to memorable or particularly inspired." Computer Gaming World gave it an unfavourable review and said, "If you take a game that's composed entirely of canned set pieces—say, Rogue Trooper—and play it over and over and over, you're going to make yourself hate it. I liked it only mildly enough the first time. So it just goes to show that in a game this thin, familiarity breeds contempt."

==== Awards ====
In 2006 the screenplay, written by Gordon Rennie, and the character Rogue were both nominated for BAFTAs.

=== Rogue Trooper Redux ===
Rogue Trooper Redux

Aggregate score
Aggregator	Score			
Aggregator	NS	PC	PS4	Xbox One
Metacritic	60/100	60/100	59/100	61/100

Review scores
Publication	Score			
Publication	NS	PC	PS4	Xbox One
GamesRadar+	N/A	N/A	3/5	N/A
Nintendo Life	7/10	N/A	N/A	N/A
Nintendo World Report	7/10	N/A	N/A	N/A
PC Gamer (UK)	N/A	58%	N/A	N/A
PC PowerPlay	N/A	5/10	N/A	N/A
Polygon	N/A	N/A	6.5/10	6.5/10
Metro	N/A	N/A	4/10	N/A

The Redux edition received more mixed reviews than the original Rogue Trooper on all platforms according to Metacritic.

==== Awards ====
The Redux edition was nominated for the "Best Action and Adventure Game" and "Heritage" awards at The Independent Game Developers' Association Awards 2018.
