= Nick Abadzis =

British writer and artist of comic books

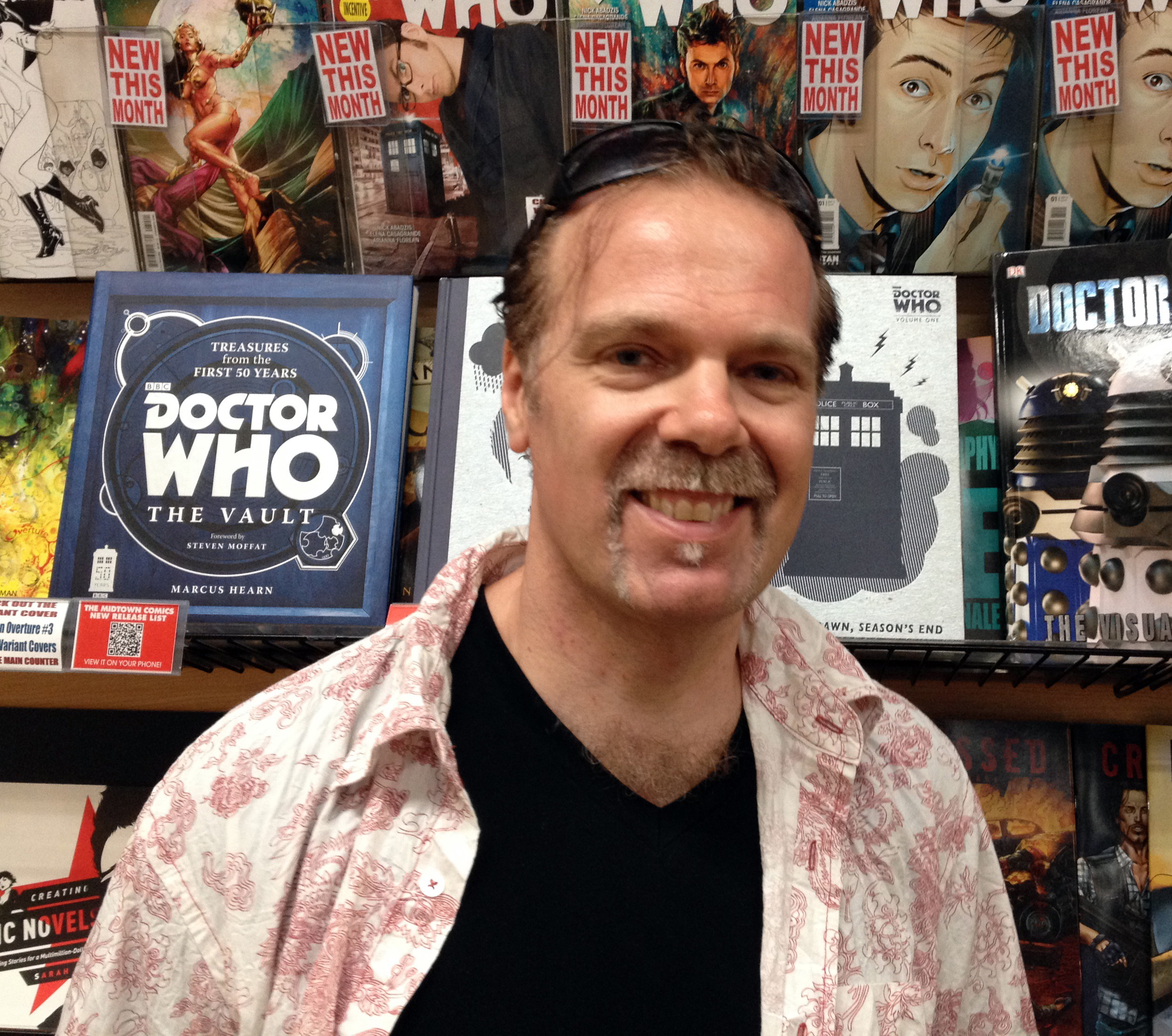
- Abadzis at a signing for Doctor Who: The Tenth Doctor #1 at Midtown Comics in Manhattan
- Born: 1965 (age 60–61) United Kingdom
- Areas: Cartoonist, Writer, Artist, Editor
- Pseudonyms: The Spock Whitney Quintet, Brian, Dougal & Mr Rusty (Collective alias with Steve Whitaker and John Buckle)
- Notable works: Laika

Nick Abadzis (Greek: Νικ Αμπατζής; born 1965) is a British comic book writer and artist.

== Early life ==
Abadzis is of Greek and British parentage and raised in Sweden, England and Switzerland. He is British by nationality.

== Career ==
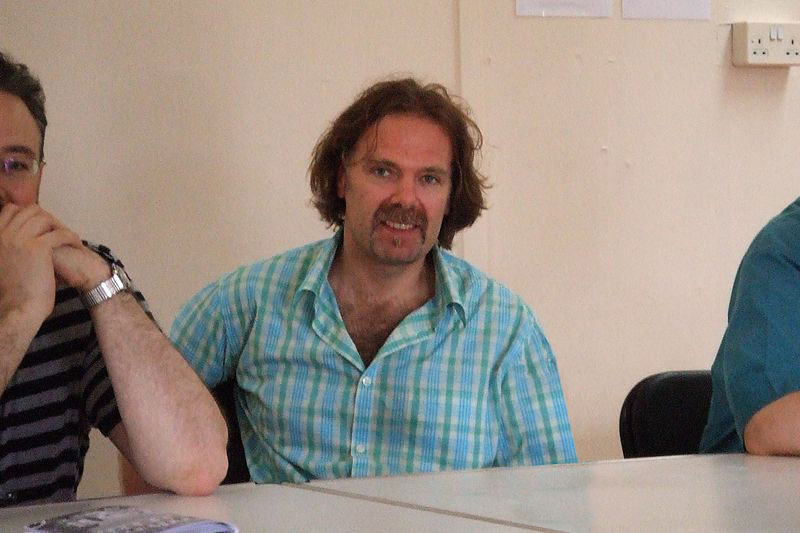
Abadzis at Caption 2008

In 1987, he secured a job at Marvel Comics' UK publishing branch where he was, at that time, the youngest-ever editor.

Abadzis went freelance in 1988 when his career as a cartoonist took off in the pages of legendary UK comics and music magazine Deadline. Here he created two of his best-known characters, Hugo Tate, a stick-man lost in a figuratively drawn world, and the shapeshifting Mr. Pleebus, who later starred in his own series of children's books. His series Hugo Tate ran in Deadline magazine from 1988 to 1994. Some of this series was collected as Hugo Tate: O, America in 1993, which won in 1994 a UK Comic Art Award for best graphic novel.

As a part of the British Invasion of American comics, he wrote Children of the Voyager for Marvel in 1993 and Millennium Fever in 1995 for Vertigo.

His graphic novel, Laika, about the eponymous dog, the first living creature from Earth to enter orbit, was published in 2007. Laika was well-received, with the New York Press remarking that "the British comics creator has fashioned a poignant and accurate portrait of the lives Laika touched in the three years leading up to Sputnik 2's launch. His characters — including the dog – are as real as the story he's telling: animated with complex personalities, flaws, humor and emotion." Laika won an Eisner award in 2008 for Best Teen graphic novel and a further nomination for Best Reality-based Work. In the same year it was nominated for a Harvey Award for Best Original Graphic Album. In 2009, the book won Meilleur Scénario (Best story/script) – Festival du Livre Aéronautique at Le Bourget Book Festival in France, and at the Napoli Comicon Awards, Italy for Best Foreign Graphic Novel.

Abadzis also worked as a newspaper cartoonist on The Sunday Correspondent (now defunct), and as a freelance illustrator and comics writer and as a development and consultant editor on a range of best-selling children's magazines for various British publishers. He has also moonlighted as a TV writer for the children's animated show Bob the Builder. He has created Cora's Breakfast for The DFC, which has run in the comic section of the weekend Guardian. The Trial of the Sober Dog, a graphic novella, was serialised in The Times over a six-month period in 2008.

Beginning in May 2010, Abadzis' one-off comics have been published weekly in Nib-Lit Comics Journal.

== Bibliography ==
=== Revolver ===
- Revolver Horror Special, 1989
- "The Head" (script, with art by Edmund Perryman)

=== Crisis ===
- "The Big Voice", (script, art by Edmund Perryman) in Crisis no. 63, 1991
- "Commuter's Journey", (script and art) in Crisis no. 63, 1991

=== Hugo Tate ===
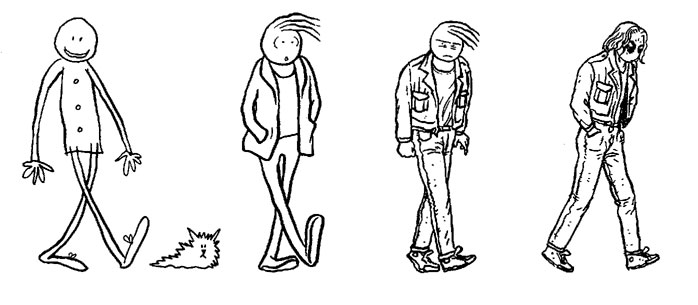
Hugo Tate

- Hugo Tate: O, America (Tundra/Atomeka, 1993)

=== Marvel ===
- Children of the Voyager (script, with art by Paul Johnson, four-issue mini-series, Marvel, 1993)

=== DC ===
- The Big Book of Death: "Six Feet Under" (script and art, Paradox Press, 1993)
- Millennium Fever (script, with art by Duncan Fegredo, four-issue mini-series, Vertigo, 1995)

=== 2000 AD ===
- Tharg's Terror Tales (script, with art by Paul Johnson):
  - "The Operatives" (in 2000 AD Winter Special, 1994)
  - "The Devil you know" (in 2000 AD No. 936, 1995)
- 2000AD Alternity Winter Special: "The Big Fight"
- Rogue Trooper (Friday): "Mind Bombs" (art, with Steve White and Edmund Perryman, in 2000 AD #937–939, 1995)
- Vector 13:
  - "Case Three: Circle of Evil" (script, with Kevin Cullen, in 2000 AD No. 953, 1995)
  - "Case Eleven: Imaginary Friend" (script, with Paul Johnson, in 2000 AD #998–999, 1996)
  - "Case 667: Suburban Hell" (art, with Igor Goldkind, in 2000AD Sci-Fi Special 1996)
  - "Case Two: It's Good to Talk" (script, with Sean Phillips, in 2000 AD #1025, 1997)
- Darkness Visible (script, with art by John Ridgway, in 2000 AD, #975–980, 1996)

=== The Pleebus Planet Books ===
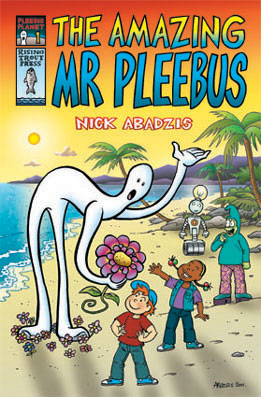
The Amazing Mr. Pleebus

- The Amazing Mr Pleebus (script and art, Orchard Books, 1996, reissued by Rising Trout Press, in 2001)
- The Freaky Beastie of Hill Road School (script and art, Orchard Books, 1997, reissued by Rising Trout Press, in 2001)
- The Magic Skateboard (script and art, Orchard Books, 1998, reissued by Rising Trout Press, in 2001)
- Voyage to Planet Voon (script and art, Orchard Books, 1999)

=== Other ===
- The Dangerous Planet (script and art, 48-page graphic novel. Heinemann, now Harcourt Education, 1999)
- The Pyramid of Doom (script and art, 48-page graphic novel. Heinemann, 2000)
- The Dog From Outer Space (script and art, Heinemann, 2001, published in the US by Rigby)
- Doctor Who: "The Betrothal of Sontar" (with co-author John Tomlinson, and art by Mike Collins, in Doctor Who Magazine #365–367, 2006)
- Laika (art and script, First Second Publishing, graphic novel, 2007)
- Cora's Breakfast (The DFC, 2008-ongoing)
- The Trial of the Sober Dog, graphic novella, serialised in The Times over a six-month period in 2008.
- Pigs Might Fly (writer, illustrated by Jerel Dye, First Second Publishing, graphic novel, 2017)
