= Tor Cyan =

Comic strip written by John Tomlinson

Tor Cyan is a 2000 AD comic-book title written by John Tomlinson. It is a continuation of Mercy Heights, which introduced the title character Tor Cyan as a futuristic 'ambulance driver'. In Tor Cyan, Tor Cyan is the pilot of a medical shuttle, who despite the obstacles of destiny is determined to dedicate his life to saving life.

Connections between Tor Cyan and the Genetic Infantrymen, and between his story and the same fictional universe as Nu-Earth, are revealed gradually over the course of the series. Tor Cyan finds it impossible to fully transcend his roots, and he becomes compelled to return to Nu-Earth and find out the truth about his past. Eventually, he discovers that his blue skin pigmentation is the product of the same genetic engineering used to create GI Supersoldiers.

== Bibliography ==
- Mercy Heights, in which Tor Cyan first appeared:
  - "Mercy Heights" (with Kev Walker, Lee Sullivan and Andrew Currie, in 2000 AD #1033-1047, 1997)
  - "Dead of Winter" (with Neil Googe, in 2000 AD #1124, 1998)
  - "Mercy Heights Book 2" (with Trevor Hairsine (1-5, 11-15) and Lee Sullivan (6-10), in 2000 AD #1133-1148, 1999)
- Rogue Trooper:
  - "Remembrance Day" (with Dave Gibbons, in 2000 AD Prog 2000, 1999)
- Tor Cyan:
  - "Blue Murder" (with Kev Walker, in 2000 AD #1223-1226, 2001)
  - "Crucible" (with Kev Walker, in 2000 AD #1250-1251, 2001)
  - "Refugee" (with Kev Walker, in 2000 AD #1252-1253, 2001)
  - "World Of Hurt" (with Colin Wilson, in 2000 AD #1254-1256, 2001)
  - "The Dead Sorcerer's Coachman" (with Colin Wilson, in 2000 AD #1263, 2001)
  - "Rahab" (with Jock, in 2000 AD #1295, 2002)
  - "Phage" (with Jock, in 2000 AD #1296, 2002)
  - "No Such Place" (with Jock, in 2000 AD #1297-1299, 2002)

== See also ==
Other Genetic Infantrymen (and women) with prominent roles:

- Rogue
- Friday
- Venus Bluegenes
- Rafe
