= Black Light (2000 AD) =

- Cover to 2000 AD #1010 featuring Black Light (2000 AD)
- Created by: Dan Abnett; Steve White; John M. Burns

Publication information
- Publisher: Rebellion Developments
- Schedule: Weekly
Title(s)
2000 AD
- Genre: Science fiction
- Publication date: July – October 1996
- Number of issues: 1001-1013
- Main character(s): Emma Paris, Wade Powers, Wiseman, Robyn Sharrif, Mark Bogard

Creative team
- Writer(s): Dan Abnett; Steve White
- Artist(s): John M. Burns; Lee Sullivan; Steve Yeowell
- Letterer(s): Ellie De Ville
- Editor(s): Tharg (David Bishop)

Black Light is a science fiction thriller that ran in the British comic anthology 2000 AD in 1996. It was created by Dan Abnett, Steve White and John M. Burns.

It chronicles the missions undertaken by an elite unit appointed by the US president to investigate and shut down black ops by rogue government agencies. The series was developed to capitalise on the popularity of The X-Files and Mission: Impossible. The influence of The X-Files in particular can be seen in the subject of government conspiracies and the involvement of mysterious men in black. The men in black in Black Light very closely resemble the men in black that act as hosts of the similarly X-Files-inspired Vector 13.

It was almost adapted as a television pilot by Francis Ford Coppola's production company.

== Plot ==
In "Survivor Syndrome" the Black Light team are made aware of a plot to assassinate the US president in London. The president's life is saved and Black Light discover that the Gulf War actually ended in a cover-up of a failed American bioweapon experiment and the propping up of Saddam Hussein. The bioweapon is also revealed to be responsible for the necrotising fasciitis affecting new member Emma Paris's face. On the mission the team leader Wade Powers is killed, Paris is put in charge and former United States Secret Service agent, Mark Bogard - the man responsible for tipping off Black Light about the assassination plot - is appointed to the team.

In "Lords of Creation" an informant reveals secrets about super soldier experiments using nanorobotics on a military base. When the Black Light team investigate they discover the dangerous destabilising effect of the technology and manage to stop a water reservoir from being infected. The team's technical expert Wiseman, however, is infected.

In "Pandora's Box" a global nuclear conspiracy is almost exposed when Black Light foil an attempt by activists to stop nuclear testing in the Pacific Ocean. At the end, a Vector 13 man in black reveals to Paris that the original nuclear tests in the 1950s inadvertently opened a dimensional gateway, and the "tests" ever since are intended to prevent an infernal force passing through the still-open gateway into this universe.

== Publications ==
- "Survivor Syndrome" (art by John M. Burns, in 2000 AD, #1001-1005, reprinted in Judge Dredd Megazine, #336, 2013)
- "Lords of Creation" (art by Lee Sullivan, in 2000 AD, #1006-1009, reprinted in Judge Dredd Megazine, #336, 2013)
- "Pandora's Box" (art by Steve Yeowell, in 2000 AD, #1010-1013, reprinted in Judge Dredd Megazine, #337, 2013 - Lee Sullivan is incorrectly credited with art in #1010)
