= Armoured Gideon =

Publication information
- Publisher: IPC Media (Fleetway) to 1999, thereafter Rebellion Developments
- First appearance: 2000 AD Prog 671 (1990)
- Created by: John Tomlinson

In-story information
- Abilities: Variety of weapons designed specifically to counter the dead.

Armoured Gideon is a comics character (and their eponymous story) who first appeared in British science fiction anthology 2000 AD. The stories were written by John Tomlinson, with art by Simon Jacob.

== Fictional character biography ==
Armoured Gideon is a robot created by a race known as The Silent Ones to prevent evil beings escaping from a parallel dimension to that of Earth's. Gideon is armed with a wide variety of weaponry to destroy anything it finds trying to escape the dimension known as "The Edge". When Gideon attacks, he does so uttering the word "Annihilate!"

In 2018 the character made a surprise return to 2000AD after nearly 25 years in the series "The Order".

== Other major characters ==
A counterpart to Gideon was created called Armoured Jerubaal. Jerubaal was meant to carry out the same task as Gideon (using its own catch phrase, "Obliterate!"), but disabled Gideon to win the favour of their creators, The Silent Ones, by guarding "The Edge" itself. Jerubaal was however, overcome by the beings inhabiting "The Edge" and buried on Earth. When it re-emerged in Gideon's debut story, damaged heavily and bent on revenge, Gideon came to Earth and destroyed it.

Gideon was pursued and disabled once more by photographer Frank Weitz, once again in the debut story. Beings from "The Edge" are invisible to photographic film, but Frank is in possession of psychic powers that enable him to capture Gideon's image which spurs him on. His editor rejected his stories, driving Frank to "The Edge" again where he disables Gideon to take better pictures of the robot but is knocked unconscious and transported back to Earth while photographing Gideon before it is completely disabled.

== Publication history ==
Gideon has appeared in 2000 AD and 2000 AD Extreme Edition no. 23:

- Armoured Gideon (by John Tomlinson and Simon Jacob):
  - "Armoured Gideon" (in 2000 AD #671-681, 1990, reprinted in Extreme Edition #23, 2007)
  - "Starhavon's Edge" (in 2000AD Sci-Fi Special 1990)
  - "No, No, Nanette" (in 2000 AD #722, 1991)
  - "Armoured Gideon Book 2" (in 2000 AD #828-840, 1993)
  - "The Collector" (with Mike White (episode 9 art), in 2000 AD #889-899, 1994)
  - "Trading Places" (in 2000 AD #928-935, 1995)
