= Simon Coleby =

British comic book artist

- Born: 1 March 1967 (age 59)
- Areas: Penciller, Inker
- Notable works: Rogue Trooper; Low Life; The Authority

Simon Coleby (born 1 March 1967) is a British comic book artist who has worked mainly for British sci-fi comic 2000 AD and Marvel Comics.

== Biography ==
Coleby started his mainstream work in the British comics industry in 1987, working at both 2000 AD and Marvel UK. His first published work was a cover for issue #222 of the latter's Transformers comic, depicting Carnivac and Springer. At 2000 AD he contributed heavily to Judge Dredd and Rogue Trooper spin-offs Friday and Venus Bluegenes, 3 as well as becoming the lead artist on Low Life.

After working with Christos Gage on "Midnighter: Armageddon", he is working on the post-World's End relaunch of The Authority with writers Dan Abnett and Andy Lanning. He will also be working on Wildstorm's adaptation of Fringe because, according to editor, Ben Abernathy, "Simon Coleby is so far ahead on 'Authority' he has time to contribute 11 pages a month."

Abernathy, has said "Simon Coleby ... is definitely on the fast-track to becoming an 'elite' level artist."

== Bibliography ==
- Tharg's Future Shocks: "Rogan's Last Ride" (with Ian Rimmer, in 2000 AD #647, 1989)
- "Crocodile Tears" (with John Tomlinson, in 2000 AD #648, 1989)
- Rogue Trooper (Friday) (with Michael Fleisher):
  - "Saharan Ice Belt War" (in 2000 AD #730-741, 1991)
  - "Scavenger of Souls Prologue" (in 2000 AD #850-851, 1993)
- Judge Dredd:
  - "School Bully" (with Garth Ennis and Gina Hart, in 2000 AD #742, 1991)
  - "A Clockwork Pineapple" (with Garth Ennis, in 2000 AD #743-745, 1991)
  - "The Flabfighters" (with Garth Ennis in 2000 AD #758-759, 1991)
  - "Koole Killers" (with Garth Ennis and Gina Hart, in 2000 AD #772-774, 1992)
  - "A Magic Place" (with Garth Ennis, Steve Dillon & Gina Hart, in 2000 AD #783-785, 1992)
  - "Dead Ringer" (with John Wagner, in Judge Dredd Megazine #3.67, 2000)
  - "Bato Loco" (with Gordon Rennie, in Judge Dredd Megazine #202, 2003)
  - "My Beautiful Career" (with John Wagner, in Judge Dredd Megazine #215, 2004)
  - "It's your Funeral, Creep!" (with Tharg the Mighty, in Judge Dredd Megazine #219, 2004)
  - "Meat Patrol" (with Gordon Rennie, in Judge Dredd Megazine #224, 2004)
  - "Mandroid: Instrument of War" (with John Wagner, in 2000 AD #1555-1556, 2007)
- Warheads #6-8 (with Nick Vince, Marvel UK, 1992)
- The Incomplete Death's Head (with Dan Abnett and John Freeman, Marvel UK, 1992)
- Death's Head II #6-7, 9 and 11 (with Dan Abnett, Marvel UK, 1992)
- The Punisher 2099 #20-25, 28 (pencils, with Pat Mills/Tony Skinner, Marvel Comics, 1994–1995)
- Venus Bluegenes:
  - "Bitchin'!" (with Steve White, in 2000AD Winter Special 1995)
  - "On the Fragshell" (with Dan Abnett, in 2000 AD #976-979, 1996)
- Lobo #52 (with Alan Grant, DC, 1998)
- Inquisitor Ascendant (with Dan Abnett, 84 pages, 2001, ISBN 1-84154-143-5)
- Inquisitor Ascendant II (with Dan Abnett, 80 pages, 2002, ISBN 1-84154-238-5)
- Bato Loco (with Gordon Rennie):
  - "True Romance" (in Judge Dredd Megazine #208, 2003)
  - "Head Job" (in Judge Dredd Megazine #229-230, 2005)
- The Legion #15, 18 (inks, with Dan Abnett/Andy Lanning, DC Comics, 2003)
- The Eternal #1-6 (inks, with writer Chuck Austen and pencils by Kev Walker, Marvel MAX, 2003–2004)
- Ultimate Nightmare (inks, writer by Warren Ellis, with pencils by Trevor Hairsine, Marvel, 2004)
- Low Life (with Rob Williams, collected in Mega-City Undercover, 160 pages, Rebellion Developments, January 2008, ISBN 1-905437-52-8):
  - "Rock and a Hard Place" (in 2000 AD #1425-1428, 2005)
  - "He's making a list..." (in 2000 AD Prog 2006, 2005)
  - "Con Artist" (in 2000 AD #1484-1490, 2006)
  - "Baby Talk" (in 2000 AD #1521-1524, 2007)
- Malone (with Cal Hamilton, in 2000 AD, #1500-1506, 2006)
- Sinister Dexter (with Dan Abnett):
  - "Pros and Cons" (in 2000 AD #1516, 2006)
  - "The Doctor is in" (in 2000 AD #1535-1538, 2007)
- "Midnighter: Armageddon", (with Christos Gage, one-shot, Wildstorm, October 2007)
- The Authority (with Dan Abnett/Andy Lanning, Wildstorm, August 2008 - ongoing) collected as:
  - World's End (136 pages, August 2009, ISBN 1-4012-2362-1)
