= Red Razors =

Publication information
- Publisher: IPC Media (Fleetway) to 1999, thereafter Rebellion Developments
- First appearance: Judge Dredd Megazine Vol 1, #8 (1991)
- Created by: Mark Millar; Steve Yeowell

In-story information
- Alter ego: First name unknown. Surname Razors.
- Team affiliations: Former Sov Blok Justice Department Judge. Former Crime gang member. Ed the Horse.
- Notable aliases: None
- Abilities: none

Red Razors is a comic strip appearing in the British anthology 2000 AD. Created by Mark Millar, it is set in the Judge Dredd universe, fifty years after the events detailed in the current Judge Dredd comics. The series debuted in Judge Dredd Megazine #1.08, in 1991.

The stories focus on a Sov-Block (formerly East-Meg Two, formerly somewhere in Russia) Judge named Razors. Judge Razors is the prototype for a new breed of Judge, a brainwashed ex-gang member, conditioned to follow the orders of his superiors without question. His partner is a genetically enhanced horse named Comrade Ed.

== Premise ==
The first storyline focused on the penetration of western culture and capitalism behind the iron curtain (for example, Elvis Presley is worshipped as a God). The storyline can be thought of as a satirical comment on Russia's current integration of western elements with its own culture. Subsequent entries were much more action-oriented, with little or no satire. Cameos in the series have included Judge Dredd.

In his last appearance, Razors threw off his brainwashing and went on a killing spree, which ended when he was shot and killed by Dredd. Also there are obvious references in the series to other series (TV especially). The main example is Comrade Ed, Razor's partner which is an obvious "take off" of Mister Ed, the talking horse.

== Bibliography ==
- Red Razors (all written by Mark Millar):
  - "Red Razors" (with Steve Yeowell, in Judge Dredd Megazine #1.08-1.15, 1991)
  - "The Secret Origin of Comrade Ed" (with Steve Yeowell, in Judge Dredd Mega-Special #5, 1992)
  - "Doctor's Orders" (with Steve Yeowell, in Judge Dredd 1993 Yearbook, 1992)
  - "Hunt For Red Razors" (with Nigel Dobbyn, in 2000 AD #908-917, 1994)
  - "Rites of Passage" (with Nigel Dobbyn, in 2000 AD #971, 1995)

The three stories from the Megazine and 2000 AD have been collected in a trade paperback:

- Red Razors (144 pages, Rebellion Developments, October 2004, ISBN 1-904265-18-9, DC Comics, November 2004, ISBN 1-4012-0393-0)
