= Harlem Heroes =

Comic strip

Publication information
- Publisher: IPC Media
- First appearance: 2000 AD #1 (February 1977)
- Created by: Pat Mills; Dave Gibbons

Harlem Heroes is a British comic strip that formed part of the original line-up of stories in 2000 AD (February 1977). Inspired by the popularity during the 1970s of kung fu films and the Harlem Globetrotters, Harlem Heroes was devised by Pat Mills, employing elements from his Hellball comic strip, and scripted by Tom Tully. Initially, the series was to have been drawn by Carlos Trigo but the Spanish artist was replaced by Dave Gibbons prior to the first issue's publication. From issue (or "prog") 25 Massimo Belardinelli drew the concluding episodes of the first series and would be retained as its regular artist for the strip's reinvention as Inferno.

== Harlem Heroes ==
By the year 2050, the game of Aeroball has swept the world! It's Football, Boxing, Kung Fu and Basketball all rolled into one! Players roar through the air wearing jet packs (controlled by buttons on their belts) and score "air strikes" by getting the ball in the "score tank". One of the top teams is the all-black Harlem Heroes!

=== Summary [first series] ===
Having made it through the preliminary round of the World Aeroball Championship, the Harlem Heroes' team bus crashes, killing all but four players. Louis Mayer, his brain alone surviving the tragedy, convinces his three fellow survivors, 'Slim', 'Hairy', and team captain John 'Giant' Clay, that they can still win the championship title.

=== Episodes ===
2000 AD progs 1–27, 2000 AD Annual 1978, 2000 AD Annual 1979 (29 episodes)

Timeline: 21st Century, usually placed in 2050

"The Sport of Tomorrow" – Prog 1 (1 episode)
"Harlem Heroes" – 2000 AD Annual 1979 (1 episode)
"The Baltimore Bulls" – progs 2–5 (4 episodes)
"The Siberian Wolves" – progs 6–8 (3 episodes)
"The Montezuma Mashers" – progs 9–11 (3 episodes)
"The Flying Scotsmen" – progs 12–15 (4 episodes)
"Gorgon's Gargoyles" – progs 16–21 (5 episodes)
"The Bushido Blades" – progs 22–24 (3 episodes)
"The Teutonic Titans" – progs 25–27 (3 episodes)
"The Berlin Blitzkriegs" – 2000 AD Annual 1978 (1 episode)

Script
Pat Mills, Tom Tully (prog 1)
Tom Tully (progs 2–27)
Art
Dave Gibbons (prog 1, Harlem Heroes pages 1 – 4), Carlos Trigo (prog 1, Harlem Heroes page 5)
Dave Gibbons (prog 2–24)
Massimo Belardinelli (progs 25–27)

== Inferno ==
Inferno is the violent sequel to Harlem Heroes. Set in the bloodthirsty arena of Inferno, an even more barbaric updating of Aeroball, with the addition of players on motorbikes (and gameplay similar to that featured in Rollerball), sportsmanship is gradually replaced by sensationalist violence and the desire for bloodshed and death on the field. Declining in-game values are shadowed by terrifying levels of boardroom corruption: their own manager, tiring of the Heroes' clean-cut image, is determined to get rid of their contracts, by taking out a contract on his own players. The scene of the Heroes' violent demise is a baroquely ruinous former casino called The Crystal Maze (a metaphor of the human mind, and a title later recycled), rendered in darkly gothic splendour by Massimo Belardinelli.

=== Summary ===
2000 AD progs 36–75 (40 episodes)

Timeline: 2078

Script
Tom Tully
Art
Massimo Belardinelli

== Judge Dredd ==
"Never mind, Citizen Giant. Look at it this way—you've lost a son but Mega-City One has gained a darned fine Judge."

=== The Academy of Law ===
Judge Giant senior graduates from Mega-City One's Academy of Law, much to the delight of his proud father, John 'Giant' Clay.

=== Episodes ===
2000 AD progs 27–28 (2 episodes)

Timeline: 2099

Script
John Wagner
Art
Ian Gibson (part 1), Mike McMahon (part 2)

=== Whatever Happened to John "Giant" Clay? ===
Judge Dredd Megazine #216 (1 episode)

Timeline: 2126

Script
Gordon Rennie
Art
Rufus Dayglo

=== Wear Iron ===
The rise and fall of Inferno is described in chapter 3, as background for a crime. The post-Atom War society was desperate for decadent sport but the events of Inferno ("the Hellcat Murders") would kill it, with Hellcat fans not returning and the average fan afraid they might get killed next.

Judge Dredd Year One: Wear Iron (2014)

Timeline: 2080

Writer
Al Ewing

== Harlem Heroes ==
A revival of the first series in name only, unrelated to Dredd.

=== Summary [second series] ===
2000 AD progs 671–676, 683–699, 701–705/745–749/776–779/928–939 (49 episodes)

Timeline: 2109

=== "Harlem Heroes" ===
2000 AD progs 671–676, 683–699, 701–705 (28 episodes)

Script
Michael Fleisher
Art
Steve Dillon and Kev Walker (parts 1–16, 18–21, 23–26)
Steve Dillon and Simon Jacob (part 17)
Steve Dillon (part 22)
Simon Jacob (part 27)
Kev Hopgood (part 28)

=== Death Sport ===
2000 AD progs 745–749 (5 episodes)

Script
Michael Fleisher
Art
Geoff Senior

=== Grey Ghost Overflight ===
2000 AD progs 776–779 (4 episodes)

Script
Michael Fleisher
Art
Ron Smith

=== Cyborg Death Trip ===
2000 AD progs 928–939 (12 episodes)

Script
Michael Fleisher
Art
Kev Hopgood and Siku

== Harlem Heroes ==
Another revival, this one starring Judge Giant's grandchild Gem Giant as the captain of a new Aeroball team.

=== Episodes ===
"Harlem Heroes" -- 2000AD Regened Volume 3
"Vs the Venetian Vipers" -- Mega-City Max

Script
Ramzee
Art
Korinna Veropoulou

== Continuity ==
- Harlem Heroes episodes 8 and 9 make reference to Mega-City One, the vast megalopolis patrolled by Judge Dredd.
- Judge Dredd is the graduating officer of Judge Giant senior.
