= Rogue Trooper =

Science fiction strip by Gerry Finley-Day and Dave Gibbons

- Cover of 2000 AD #228 (September 1981), including the first appearance of Rogue Trooper.

Character information
- First appearance: 2000 AD #228 (1981)
- Created by: Gerry Finley-Day; Dave Gibbons

In-story information
- Full name: Rogue

Publication information
- Publisher: IPC Media (Fleetway) to 1999, thereafter Rebellion Developments
- Title(s): Numerous
- Formats: Original material for the series has been published as a strip in the comics anthology(s) 2000 AD.
- Genre: Military science fiction
- Publication date: 1981 – present

Creative team
- Writer(s): Gerry Finley-Day; Gordon Rennie
- Artist(s): Dave Gibbons
- Editor(s): Tharg (Steve MacManus - Matt Smith)

Reprints
- Collected editions
- The Future of War: ISBN 1-905437-39-0
- Fort Neuro: ISBN 1905437161
- The Eye of the Traitor: ISBN 1904265529
- To the Ends of Nu-Earth: ISBN 1904265804
- Re-Gene: ISBN 1904265847
- Realpolitik: ISBN 1904265944

Rogue Trooper is a science fiction strip in the British comic 2000 AD, created by Gerry Finley-Day and Dave Gibbons in 1981. It portrays the adventures of a "Genetic Infantryman" named Rogue and three uploaded minds mounted on his equipment who search for the Traitor General who betrayed their regiment to the enemy.

The series was rebooted in 1989 in the story "The War Machine", featuring a new version of the character called Friday. This version of the character last appeared in 1996. The original character returned in 1999 and all stories since then have featured the original Rogue. The character has also featured in a number of 2000 AD crossovers.

== Publication history ==
Gibbons left the strip early on to be replaced by a succession of artists and writers who have taken the strip in several different directions over the years. Artists to have drawn the character include Brett Ewins, Cam Kennedy and Colin Wilson. This quest continued from 1981 until 1985, when the G.I. had his final confrontation with the traitor general and, after a brief further run set on the Planet Horst, Finley-Day ceased writing the strip. Simon Geller took over, reinventing the character as an intergalactic hitman attempting to end the war by assassinating key figures, but this new direction was dropped in 1989. John Smith wrote a 'flashback' story, "Cinnabar", set in Rogue's deserter days, before original series artist Dave Gibbons returned to write a much more radical revamp of the character.

In "The War Machine", Gibbons and artist Will Simpson created a different war, set on a different planet, starring a different Genetic Infantryman, this time called Friday. The bio-chips were dropped, and Gibbons concentrated on the politics and economics of war and the sinister nature of the genetic engineering involved. A new ongoing series featuring Friday followed, written by American writer Michael Fleisher. In Fleisher's final story, "Scavenger of Souls", the bio-chips are reintroduced via an alien 'soul collector'.

Fleischer was replaced with Steve White, who made the military aspect of the strip more up-to-date and tried to reconcile the two versions of the character. He also reintroduced Venus Bluegenes (Helm's treacherous girlfriend from an earlier story who gained a more prominent role during the Simon Geller run) who had her own short spin-off run. His run on the character was the 2000 AD debut of artist Henry Flint.

The character was rested after White's last story in 1996. In 1997 a related character, blue-skinned ambulance pilot Tor Cyan was introduced in the story Mercy Heights.

In 2002 the original Rogue was reintroduced, again in flashback to his days hunting the traitor general, written by Gordon Rennie. Artists have included Staz Johnson, Dylan Teague, Mike Collins, Simon Coleby and PJ Holden. In 2004 Rennie stated that he had intended to revamp the character yet again, but had been blocked by 2000 AD editorial. He also hints that any return to the Rogue Trooper universe will concentrate on supporting cast and not include the Rogue character. This can be seen in the new series The 86ers.

== Plot synopsis ==
The story is initially set on the planet Nu-Earth, where a war of attrition between two factions, the Norts and Southers, is being fought. The Norts are a fascist society, with whom the Traitor General was briefly allied, while the Southers are democratic. Rogue later travels to the planet Horst searching for an antidote to a deterioration affecting the biochips - bio-silicon microchips implanted into Rogue's equipment, and containing the personalities of his dead comrades, Bagman, Gunnar and Helm - his backpack, assault rifle and helmet respectively.

There are similarities and occasional references to past Earth conflicts including the American Civil War and both World Wars, with the Norts resembling Germany, and the Southers the Allied forces. During the conflict, the use of chemical and biological weapons has poisoned the planet. As a result, what remains of the population of the planet, including the troops of both sides, live in enclosed domed military bases and habitats. They wear protective suits, helmets and respiration gear when outside their domes. These suits are known as "chemsuits". Any damage to the helmet or chemsuit is usually fatal to the wearer.

In an attempt to bring an end to the stalemate, the Souther High Command create the GI, or "Genetic Infantryman", a soldier genetically engineered to be immune to the poisonous atmosphere of Nu-Earth, and therefore able to fight without chemsuits. The Souther High Command deploys the entire GI Regiment in a mass spaceborne capsule drop over an area known as "The Quartz Zone", which resembles one of the Earth's poles because the surface has an icy, glass-like nature due to nuclear weapon detonation melting and crystallizing the ground. The assault was intended to be a surprise attack, but because a traitor within Souther High Command passed details of it to the Norts, they were expecting it and employed elite infantry known as the Kashan and Kashar Legions to repulse the assault. The entire GI Regiment - apart from Rogue - was wiped out. This event is referred to as "The Quartz Zone Massacre". Rogue, the only surviving G.I., went AWOL in order to track down the traitor. Along the way he thwarts numerous Nort schemes, discovers and inadvertently destroys the only portion of Nu-Earth not contaminated by chemical weapons, and is betrayed by every female character he encounters.

A later storyline – "MilliCom Memories" – shows how the GIs progress through their training, and that rather than a name each GI has a letter suffixed by their age. Rogue is "R", Gunnar "G", Helm "H" and Bagman "B". Two other troopers "D" and "N" are referenced in the storyline. During their training each GI is given a nickname - Gunnar is so named because of his marksmanship ability. Millicom Memories showed there were other prototype GIs before the development of Rogue's class, some of which were killed during his training. Much earlier prototype GIs, created by genetically modifying existing humans, featured in the story "First of the Few" in the 1984 2000 AD annual. All except one were killed within 24 hours of deployment on Nu Earth. The final proto-GI died of old age shortly after being discovered by Rogue, saying he had been on Nu Earth "...years and years and years, dog-chip."

In a multi-part story titled "The Marauders", Rogue encounters a group of deserters from both Nort and Souther sides, who operate as scavengers from a hidden base and attack both Norts and Southers in order to obtain food, ammunition and supplies. Unknown to Rogue, the commander of The Marauders is the Traitor General. Due to an accident the General was severely burned and is now unrecognisable. The General later reveals himself to Rogue, then captures and tortures him. Rogue eventually escapes, and with the help of one of the Marauders (a Souther pilot known as 'Player'), defeats the Marauders that pursue him. The Traitor General escapes, destroying the Marauder base as he does so.

In "All Hell on the Dix-I Front" a massive Nort assault forces the Southerners to retreat from a vast area of Nu-Earth, similar to the Ardennes assault of World War II. During this, other elite units of the Nort military are introduced, such as the Sun Legion, a Regiment of solar glider troops, and the Scum Marines, an amphibious assault force. "Sister Sledge", a military nurse and a pun on the pop group of the same name, accompanies Rogue during the Dix-I campaign. She is secretly an enemy agent known as a "filth columnist", a play on fifth columnist, and dies in the final episode of the series when Bagman causes her to fall from a boat into the heavily polluted and toxic "Scum Sea".

"Fort Neuro" introduced a defensive line that had been cut off from both Southers and Norts since the beginning of the war. The Fort has been split into separate sectors by clouds, meaning each sector operates independently of each other, without any contact or cohesion. The soldiers within each sector are suffering from posttraumatic stress disorder, so the French sector – known as "Franks" – wear Napoleonic era uniforms, and hold grand balls that were popular in that period. Other sectors display similarly erratic behaviour, with the English troops – known as "Lime-ees" – dressing as holiday camp redcoats and behaving as though they are on a perpetual holiday, while the "Rom" garrison fashion themselves as 1950's Teddy Boys - or "Romeos".

Rogue is immune to all known toxins, diseases, and acids, with three known exceptions:

- A new plant is discovered after permafrost is melted in an arctic zone which renders him unconscious.
- In the flashback story "Cinnabar" a retrovirus is engineered specifically to target his immune system, making him susceptible to all other Nu-Earth hazards, ultimately forcing him to wear a chem-suit.
- On Horst, Rogue is bitten by one of the Dragoid creatures, causing him to pass out. As Bagman points out, Rogue was engineered to be resistant to conditions on Nu Earth, not those unique to Horst. However, the toxin quickly wears off, and in fact has a beneficial effect on Rogue.

In a lighter moment during the Fort Neuro series, Rogue is shown to have difficulty breathing when in a staff car full of officers from the "Rom" sector, who in anticipation of a good night out with the neighboring "Scan" sector, have applied too much aftershave.

The Biochips are infected by a latent malady unknowingly contracted whilst passing through the Neverglades area of Nu Earth. The unnamed condition renders them susceptible to "Enzyme E dysfunction", which causes their newly re-gened bodies to disintegrate, leaving only their bio-chips.

== Historical influences ==
Nort troopers in a page of a Rogue Trooper comic

Many elements of the Rogue back-story were inspired by World War II, The Vietnam War, the American Civil War and the Cold War. Norts (Northerner Unionists) fought against generally less-well equipped Southers (Southern Confederates), and several battles were referenced, such as the First Battle of Bull Run, which was retold as the "Battle of Mek-Bull Run". The Norts appear totalitarian in nature. While their uniforms have Nazi connotations their dialect and names are mostly quasi-Slavic, as if they represented a futuristic version of the Soviet Bloc, although there is some usage of German names as well, for example General Vagner, Admiral Torpitz (a play on the German admiral Tirpitz). Their conduct and methods of waging war are also more barbaric than those of the comparatively civilised Southers. Although as the series develops the Southers are also shown committing comparably immoral acts as well. "Genetic Infantryman" is a direct homage to the supposed "Government Issue" tag that American troops were nicknamed after.

== Bibliography ==
The Rogue Trooper has appeared frequently in comics and other media.

=== Stories in regular issues ===
The original run, mostly written by Gerry Finley-Day, was:

- "Rogue Trooper" (with art by Dave Gibbons, in 2000 AD #228, 1981)
- "Nu Paree" (with art by Dave Gibbons, in 2000 AD #229, 1981)
- "Glass Zone" (with art by Dave Gibbons, in 2000 AD #230, 1981)
- "Doomsday Valley" (with art by Dave Gibbons, in 2000 AD #231, 1981)
- "Terror of the Decapitators" (with art by Dave Gibbons, in 2000 AD #232, 1981)
- "Raiders" (with art by Dave Gibbons, in 2000 AD #234, 1981)
- "Scum Sea" (with art by Dave Gibbons, in 2000 AD #235, 1981)
- "Ascent To Buzzard-Three" (with art by Colin Wilson, in 2000 AD #236-238, 1981)
- "The Rookies" (with art by Dave Gibbons, in 2000 AD #239-240, 1981)
- "Blue Moon" (with art by Colin Wilson, in 2000 AD #241, 1981)
- "Poison" (with art by Mike Dorey, in 2000 AD #242-243, 1981)
- "Fear of the Machine" (with art by Colin Wilson, in 2000 AD #246-248, 1982)
- "The Dreamweavers" (with art by Dave Gibbons, in 2000 AD #249-250, 1982)
- "The Buzzard" (with art by Colin Wilson, in 2000 AD #251-253, 1982)
- "The Petrified Forest" (with art by Mike Dorey, in 2000 AD #254-257, 1982)
- "War of Nerves" (with art by Colin Wilson, in 2000 AD #258, 1982)
- "Bagman Blues" (with art by Brett Ewins and Eric Bradbury, in 2000 AD #260-262, 1982)
- "The Body Looters" (with art by Cam Kennedy, in 2000 AD #265, 1982)
- "All Hell on the Dix-I Front" (with art by Colin Wilson, Cam Kennedy and Brett Ewins, in 2000 AD #266-277, 1982)
- "Assassination Run" (with art by Cam Kennedy, in 2000 AD #278-279)
- "Hats Off to Helm" (with art by Cam Kennedy, in 2000 AD #280-281)
- "Marauders" (with art by Colin Wilson and Cam Kennedy, in 2000 AD #282-289)
- "Fort Neuro" (with art by Brett Ewins and Cam Kennedy, in 2000 AD #290-310, 1982–1983)
- "Major Magnam" (with art by Brett Ewins, in 2000 AD #311-315, 1983)
- "Bigfoot" (with art by Cam Kennedy, in 2000 AD #316, 1983)
- "Bio-Wire" (with art by Cam Kennedy, in 2000 AD #317, 1983)
- "Milli-Com Memories" (with art by Cam Kennedy, in 2000 AD #318-322, 1983)
- "Vid-Vultures" (with art by Brett Ewins, in 2000 AD #323-326, 1983)
- "Eye of the Traitor" (with art by Cam Kennedy, in 2000 AD #327-332, 1983)
- "Frisco Phog" (with art by Boluda, in 2000 AD #333-334, 1983)
- "From Hell to Eternity" (with art by Brett Ewins, in 2000 AD #335-340, 1983)
- "Mega-Minefield" (with art by Boluda, in 2000 AD #341-342, 1983)
- "Gasbah" (with art by Cam Kennedy, in 2000 AD #343-347, 1983)
- "Timeslip" (with art by Boluda, in 2000 AD #348-349, 1983)
- "Colonel Kovert" (with art by Cam Kennedy, in 2000 AD #350-355, 1984)
- "You Only Die Twice" (with art by Cam Kennedy, in 2000 AD #358-364, #366-368, 1984)
- "Message From Milli-Com" (with art by Cam Kennedy, in 2000 AD #369-377, 1984)
- "Just Routine" (with art by Trevor Goring, in 2000 AD #378, 1984)
- "Blind Terror" (with art by Steve Dillon, in 2000 AD #379-380, 1984)
- "Death Valley" (with art by Cam Kennedy, in 2000 AD #381-383, 1984)
- "M For Murder" (script by Steve McManus, (credited as "Rogan") with art by Cam Kennedy, in 2000 AD #384-386, 1984)
- "To the Ends of Nu Earth" (with art by Cam Kennedy, in 2000 AD #387-392, 1984)
- "Re-Gene" (with art by Cam Kennedy, in 2000 AD #401-406, 1985)
- "The Return of Rogue Trooper" (with art by José Ortiz, in 2000 AD #410-419, 1985)
- "Antigen of Horst" (with art by José Ortiz, in 2000 AD #422-426, #428-432, 1985)
- "Return to Milli-Com" (with art by Cam Kennedy, in 2000 AD #444-449, 1985)

Subsequently, Rogue Trooper appeared in stories by three other writers:

- "The Hitman" (written by Simon Geller and Steve MacManus, with art by Steve Dillon, in 2000 AD #495-499, 1986)
- "Hit One" (written by Simon Geller, with art by Steve Dillon, in 2000 AD #520-531, 1987)
- "Hit Two" (written by Simon Geller, with art by Steve Dillon, in 2000 AD #568-572, 1988)
- "Hit Three – The Violent Majority" (written by Simon Geller, with art by Steve Dillon, in 2000 AD #574-575, 1988)
- "Through the Eyes of a Gun" (script and art by Steve Dillon, in 2000 AD #589, 1988)
- "Hit Four – The New Moral Army" (written by Simon Geller, with art by Steve Dillon, in 2000 AD #598-600, #602-603, 1988)

The Hitman storyline concluded in the 2000 AD Winter Special 1989 (see below).

There was then a story set before the Hitman series:

- "Cinnabar" (written by John Smith, with pencils by Steve Dillon and inks by Kev Walker, in 2000 AD #624-630 and 633–635, 1989)

=== Stories in specials and annuals ===
- "Milli-Way Sixty-Six!" (written by Gerry Finley-Day, art by Eric Bradbury, in 2000 AD Sci-Fi Special 1982)
- "Pray for War" (written by Alan Moore, art by Brett Ewins, in 2000 AD Annual 1983, 1982)
- "The Droidonators" (written by Gerry Finley-Day, art by Boluda, in 2000 AD Sci-Fi Special 1983)
- "First of the Few" (written by Alan Moore, art by Jesus Redondo, in 2000 AD Annual 1984, 1983)
- "Portrait of a Rebel!" (written by Simon Gellar, art by Brett Ewins, in 2000 AD Sci-Fi Special 1984)
- "The War of Words" (written by Ian Rogan, art by Robin Smith, in 2000 AD Annual 1985, 1984)
- "On the Rogue Again" (text story, writer unknown, illustrated by Cam Kennedy, in 2000 AD Sci-Fi Special 1985)
- untitled story (written by Simon Gellar, art by Cam Kennedy, in 2000 AD Annual 1986, 1985)
- "Killothon" (written by Pat Mills, art by Mike Collins and Mark Farmer, in Diceman 3, 1986)
- "The Fanatics" (written by Peter Milligan, art by José Ortiz, in 2000 AD Sci-Fi Special 1986)
- "Nort by Nortwest" (written by Peter Milligan, art by José Ortiz, in 2000AD Annual 1987, 1986)
- "Space Zombies" (written by Pat Mills, art by Mike Collins, in Diceman 5, 1986)
- "The Hit: Conclusion" (written by Steve Dillon, with art by Chris Weston, in 2000 AD Winter Special, 1989)

=== After the Friday reboot ===
(For the full series of stories featuring Friday, see Friday (2000 AD)#Bibliography.)

Rogue also appeared in crossovers with the new "Friday" series (leading up to the deaths of Rogue and Bagman in #949), all written by Steve White:

- "Blue on Blue" (with art by Henry Flint, in 2000 AD #928-931, 1995)
- "Mind Bombs" (with art by Edmund Perryman/Nick Abadzis, in 2000 AD #937-939, 1995)
- "Ascent" (with art by Steve Tappin, in 2000 AD #946-949, 1995)

After the new series finished, the original series returned in a story set after Rogue's death, written by John Tomlinson:

- "Remembrance Day" (with art by Dave Gibbons, in 2000 AD Prog 2000, 1999)

The original Rogue later returned in stories set before his death, all written by Gordon Rennie:

- "What Lies Beneath" (with pencils by Staz Johnson and inks by David Roach, in 2000 AD #1301-1304, 2002)
- "Weapons of War" (with art by Dylan Teague, in 2000 AD #1305, 2002)
- "Overkill" (with Simon Coleby, in 2000 AD #1306-1307, 2002)
- "Lions" (with Staz Johnson (1308) and Mike Collins (1309), in 2000 AD #1308-1309, 2002)
- "A Visit to the Boneyard" (with pencils by Mike Collins and inks by David Roach, in 2000 AD #1310-1311, 2002)
- "Requiem" (with Simon Coleby, in 2000 AD #1312, 2002)
- "Angels" (with Simon Coleby, in 2000 AD Prog 2003, 2002)
- "Ghouls" (with pencils by Staz Johnson (episodes 1–4) and Mike Collins (ep. 5–6), and inks by David Roach (ep. 3–6), in 2000 AD #1344-1349, 2003)
- "Realpolitik" (with PJ Holden, in 2000 AD #1380-1385, 2004)
- "Condor Six Down" (with Simon Coleby, in 2000 AD #1462-1464, 2005)
- "New Model Army" (with Steve Pugh (art) & Ian Edginton (script)2000 AD #1477-1479, 2006)

Gerry Finley-Day returned to the character after 25 years away, for the end of year special in 2010:

- "Dead Ringer" (with Staz Johnson, in 2000 AD Prog 2011, 2010)

In a short series of one-off stories called What If...? featuring alternative takes on popular 2000 AD characters, Rogue Trooper returned in a story written by Andy Diggle:

- "What If... Gunnar Survived the Quartz Zone Massacre?" (with Colin Wilson, in 2000 AD #1771, 2012)

The series appeared in one-off stories in annual special issues from 2014:

- "Dregs of War" (written by Guy Adams, art by Darren Douglas, in 2000 AD Sci-Fi Special 2014)
- "The Feast" (written by Guy Adams, art by Lee Carter, in 2000 AD Winter Special 2014)
- "Death of a Demon" (written by Guy Adams, art by Darren Douglas, in 2000 AD Sci-Fi Special 2015)
- "Shore Leave" (written by Guy Adams, art by Jimmy Broxton, in 2000 AD Sci-Fi Special 2016)

The character returned to the regular issues of the comic in 2016:

- "Ghosts of Nu-Earth" (written by Gordon Rennie, art by Richard Elson, in 2000 AD #2000, 2016)
- "A Soldier's Duty" (written by James Robinson, art by Leonardo Manco, in 2000 AD #2050, 2017)
- "The Thousand Days" (written by Alex de Campi, art by Sam Beck & Eva de la Cruz, in 2000 AD Sci-Fi Special 2018)
- "Secret of the Keep" (written by Cavan Scott, art by Nick Roche, in 2000 AD #2130, 2019)
- "Savage Swamp" (written by Cavan Scott, art by Nick Roche & Abigail Bulmer, in 2000 AD #2170, 2020)
- "Mortal Remains" (written by Mike Carroll, art by Gary Erskine, in 2000 AD #2300, 2022)
- "Brothers" (written by Kek-W, art by Warwick Fraser-Coombe, in 2000 AD #2312, 2022)
- "Blighty Valley" (written by Garth Ennis, art by Patrick Goddard, in 2000 AD #2326–2339, 2023)
- "Runaway" (written by Geoffrey D. Wessel, art by Simon Coleby & F. Segala & S. del Grosso, in 2000 AD #2362, 2023)
- "War Child" (written by David Barnett, art by Paul Marshall & Pippa Bowland, in 2000 AD #2375, 2024)
- "Souther Belle" (written by Geoffrey D. Wessel, art by Dan Cornwell & Chris Blythe, in 2000 AD #2386-2391, 2024)
- "Recon" (written by Geoffrey D. Wessel, art by Paul Marshall & Pippa Bowland, in 2000 AD #2393-2398, 2024)
- "When a G.I. Dies" (written by Garth Ennis, art by Patrick Goddard, in 2000 AD #2401-2412, 2024)
- "Renegade" (written by Alex Paknadel, art by Jake Lynch & Dylan Teague, in 2000 AD Annual 2025)
- "Holiday in the Hotzone" (written by Karl Stock, art by Ilias Kyriazis, in 2000 AD #2413, 2024)
- "The Stack" (written by Karl Stock, art by John McCrea & Jack Davies, in 2000 AD #2425, 2025)
- "Tides of War" (written by Andi Ewington, art by Paul Marshall & Pippa Bowland, in 2000 AD #2429–2436, 2025)
- "Ghost Patrol" (written by Alex de Campi, art by Neil Edwards & Matt Soffe, in 2000 AD #2450-2463, 2025)
- "Smokestack" (written by T. C. Eglington, art by Staz Johnson, in 2000 AD Annual 2026, 2025)
- "Enemy Mined" (written by Andi Ewington, art by Karl Richardson, in 2000 AD #2476, 2026)
- "An Iteration of Allies" (written by Andi Ewington, art by Sinu Senan & Jim Boswell, in Judge Dredd Megazine #493–498, 2026)
- "Run Amok" (written by Andi Ewington, art by Nicolo Assirelli & John Charles, in 2000 AD #2498, 2026)
- "The Long Shot" (written by Andi Ewington, art by Conor Boyle, in 2000 AD #2506, 2026)
- "Bitter Fruit" (written by Geoffrey D. Wessel, art by Neil Edwards & Matt Soffe, in 2000 AD #2508-ongoing, 2026)

== Spin-offs and reboots ==
=== The 86ers ===
The 86ers was created by writer Gordon Rennie and drawn by artists Karl Richardson and PJ Holden. The story stars G.I. pilot Rafella "Rafe" Blue and her robot Gabe.

=== Venus Bluegenes ===
Venus Bluegenes appeared both in Rogue Trooper and in her own eponymous strip, with stories written by authors including Grant Morrison, Steve White and Dan Abnett.

=== Tor Cyan ===
Tor Cyan appeared both in Mercy Heights and in his own eponymous strip, in a series written by John Tomlinson.

=== Jaegir ===
Jaegir is a recurring series in 2000 AD, focusing on Kapitan-Inspector Atalia Jaegir, who serves in the Nordland State Security Police. Her role is to hunt down escaped war criminals.

=== Hunted ===
Gordon Rennie and artist PJ Holden produced Hunted, a nine-part story told from the point of view of the Traitor General, in 2016. It began in 2000AD progs 2001 to 2009. It features a young Atalia Jaegir and a monstrous early specimen of the G.I. project.

=== IDW Publishing reboot ===
IDW Publishing's Rogue Trooper #1.

On 20 July 2013, American company IDW Publishing announced that after the success of its adaptation of Judge Dredd from 2000 AD it would now champion Rogue Trooper with recoloured old issues as well as completely new stories. On 13 November 2013 it was announced that the new series would be written by British fantasy writer Brian Ruckley and drawn by Alberto Ponticelli. Brian Ruckley acquired the position "by writing a pitch document that people apparently liked." He described his first challenge as scriptwriter as "I can now say from personal experience that writing comics is not straightforward or effortless!"

The new Rogue Trooper features a re-designed helmet, rifle and backpack which serve as the three main supporting characters in the stories. The first episode was originally set to ship at the end of February 2014, but the first issue was actually released on 5 March 2014. Due to lower-than-expected sales, the decision was made to put the series "on hold". The final issue of the new Rogue Trooper series was issue 4, published on 21 May 2014. All four issues were collected as a trade paperback and released on 17 September 2014 under the title Rogue Trooper: Last Man Standing. The series was reprinted in four issues of the Judge Dredd Megazine (#459 to 462) in 2023.

IDW also published Rogue Trooper Classics, a series of recoloured stories from 2000 AD, in order. It was originally intended to consist of 12 issues (with issue 1 being published on 14 May 2014), but like the new Rogue title, it was cut short, with only 8 issues to be produced in total – again, a result of lower-than-expected sales.

=== Nu Earth War Tales ===
Nu Earth War Tales are short stories by a variety of writers and artists, which are set on Nu Earth, but generally focused on characters other than Rogue.

== Other media ==
A range of Rogue Trooper material has been produced:

=== Novels ===
There are three novels based on Rogue Trooper:

- Crucible (Gordon Rennie, October 2004 ISBN 1-84416-061-0)
- Blood Relative (James Swallow, March 2005 ISBN 1-84416-061-0)
- The Quartz Massacre (Rebecca Levene, March 2006 ISBN 1-84416-110-2)

=== Boardgames ===
The Rogue Trooper Boardgame was released in 1987 by Games Workshop.

EN Publishing released the Rogue Trooper tabletop roleplaying game in 2020.

=== Video games ===
A number of Rogue Trooper computer games have been released in 1986 and 1990. An isometric shooter by Piranha Software for the Amstrad CPC, Commodore 64 and ZX Spectrum was released in 1986. The game consists of killing Norts while searching Nu-Earth for 8 vid-tapes containing evidence of the Traitor General's involvement in the Quartz Zone Massacre. On finding all 8 tapes, Rogue has to return to the Souther base of Milli-Com to prove the General's treachery and the extenuating circumstances of his going AWOL. During the game, as well as the vid-tapes, players could also pick up medi-kits to regain health and ammo boxes to feed Gunnar. A platform game incorporating first-person vehicle levels for the Amiga and Atari ST by Krisalis Software came out in 1990.

After Rebellion bought 2000 AD they released a third-person shooter Rogue Trooper video game in 2006.

In 2009 Rogue Trooper was featured as a character costume DLC kit in the game LittleBigPlanet for PlayStation 3.

In 2017 Rogue Trooper Redux, a remake of the 2006 game, was released to Windows, PlayStation 4, Xbox One and Nintendo Switch.

=== Film ===
In 2011, Grant Morrison has spoken about writing a Rogue Trooper screenplay for Sam Worthington's production company Full Clip Production.

On July 2018, Duncan Jones revealed that he would direct a film adaptation of the character. The film was animated using Unreal Engine 5.
