= The 86ers =

Publication information
- Publisher: Rebellion Developments
- Schedule: Weekly
Title(s)
2000 AD #1480–1485
2000 AD #1508–1510
Prog 2007
2000 AD #1544–1549
2000 AD #1625–present
- Formats: Original material for the series has been published as a strip in the comics anthology(s) 2000 AD.
- Genre: Military science fiction
- Publication date: March 2006 – present
- Main character(s): Rafaelle Blue; Gabe

Creative team
- Writer(s): Gordon Rennie; Arthur Wyatt
- Artist(s): PJ Holden
- Editor(s): Tharg (Matt Smith)

Reprints
- Collected editions
- The 86ers: ISBN 1-905437-99-4

The 86ers is a 2000 AD comic story set in the Rogue Trooper universe and created by writer Gordon Rennie and artist Karl Richardson, now being drawn by PJ Holden.

The story stars G.I. pilot Rafaella "Rafe" Blue and her robot Gabe. The title refers to the 86th Air Support Reconnaissance Squadron, a "dumping ground for every failure and freak" (including Nort turncoats), who are stationed in the Acoma System ("A-Hole"), an important Souther mining operation.

== Characters ==
- Rafaelle Blue or Rafe is the main character. She is G.I. doll fighter pilot and is immune to over twelve thousand known toxins and poison gases. She has a memory implant based around Rogue, programmed to assist her in a mission she doesn't know about and which regularly talks to her. Recently she has caught an infection from Nort zombies, which has mutated her implant to the extent it has its own agenda. She has few friends and has assisted the Norts against the Grendel assassin out of a principle of outcasts sticking together.
- Gabe is Rafe's robot who assists her on her missions, with a personality matrix "designed by a bunch of bored frathouse boys". She is used to hack devices and may have weapons. She has apparently been fried by Japeth on the Nort asteroid.
- Commander Harrigan is the chain-smoking Squadron Commander of the base. She is the one who sent Rafe to the infected Nort base, for the reason that Rafe is immune to most chemicals, toxins and poisons. She's a deeply unpleasant and misanthropic figure, and has shown annoyance that the Acoma struggle is seen by Milli-Com as "one of the crappy wars nobody really cares about".
- Elson is a womanizing fighter pilot who introduced Rafe to the Citadel. He appears friendly and was the only one showing genuine concern when she was in danger in Prog 1483 (wanting to go in and retrieve her).
- Kristos is the base PSI. He is one of the only friends Rafe has got on the base but we have yet to discover more of him. Odds on him being the base's Nort spy at seven to one.
- Becca Hunter is a Flight Leader. She is haunted by the deaths of her family at Nort hands, leading to heavy drug usage and an obsessive belief she's hearing the screams of the dead in her comms. She shows extreme viciousness and nearly faced the death penalty after firing on a Nort ship that had surrendered. She was instead sent to the 86ers, secretly on a mission for Colonel Kovert...
- Stalov and the Norts have switched sides after their Klan attempted (and failed) in a coup. Stalov actually betrayed his Klan-Marshal, believing klan rivalries and coups were damaging Nortland's war effort; it does not appear that his comrades know this. They are mistrusted and disliked by all at Acoma, and have deliberately baited Becca with stories of their kills on Nu-Karthage. Recently, they were targets of a Nort Grendel assassin and turned to Rafe for help.
- Doctor Friedkin is the most mysterious character who seems to be keeping progress of Rafe in the base. Originally a geneticist on the GI project, he turned to Xeno-Archaeology and an obsession with elder races after encountering a vast, biological alien ship in a jump gate accident. In Sub 17, at the lower tunnels he is trying to open the thing seen in the Nort base as an archaeological dig, although it may be the thing that caused the infection. An illness (Progeria) is causing him to age at an accelerated rate.
- Japeth is a mysterious alien hybrid who saved Rafe from the Nort base, although he apparently killed Rafe's robot Gabe. His reason for saving her was "it isn't her time yet".
- Security Chief Montuez is working with Friedkin in the conspiracy. He views Rafe as a "gene-freak".

== Plot ==
The Acoma System is a Souther-held warzone. It is centered on a gas giant (also called Acoma) with ore-rich moons, and thus is a valuable mining site for the Souther war effort. Protecting the supply routes is the 86th Air Support Reconnaissance Squadron - the 86ers. It is a dumping ground for failures and freaks and now G.I. Rafaella Blue has joined them. The 86ers are based out of the Citadel, a fortress built on an asteroid inhabited by the alien Termies ("Pretty harmless, as long as you don't go wandering about the lower levels on your own"). It is known a Nort spy is on the base, with the crew betting on who it might be. The alien Varr live nearby; little is known about them and they leave the 86ers alone for the most part.

Rafe was sent to investigate an SOS at a Nort base that had been hit by a bioweapon and was infected by Nort zombies, discovering in the process that the base was a science station researching an alien sarcophagus. The base was destroyed by the Varr but Friedkin's conspiracy knows about the sarcophagus and has one of their own; Harrigan is unaware of this. Recovering from her infection, Rafe experienced visions related to an implanted memory program - with the face of Rogue Trooper - who's attempting to activate her memories and black-ops programming to help an unknown employer working within the base. An assassin tried to kill her with a Nort serum, only to be shot by Harrigan; this assassin is unrelated to the Conspiracy, meaning another network is active at Acoma.

Since this story, the Nort turncoats have been targeted by a Grendel - a genetically modified assassin - and Nort forces have begun massing for a major assault on Acoma.

The first page of the strip showed Rafe's ship damaging and crashing on Acoma. The rest of the plot occurred "seven months earlier" and it is not yet known what will cause Rafe to be in that situation.

=== Conspiracy ===
This secret group of Souther scientists and personnel (led by Doctor Friedkin and Montuez) are responsible for extravating a (presumably crashed) Varr. They appear to be responsible for the murder of a Souther spy, Cochran. They have also been made aware of the Norts' interest in Rafaella Blue. In Prog 2007, it is discovered that their true goal is to open a tomb consisting of Old Ones on Acoma and gain the secret of immortality, and they are constantly sending teams to investigate it (which are slaughtered by unknown beings). They secretly have one of the Old Ones in stasis, gained from the sarcophagus.

== Bibliography ==
- The 86ers:
  - "Touchdown" (by writer Gordon Rennie with art by Karl Richardson (1-2), drawing by PJ Holden (3-6) and colours by Chris Blythe (3-6), in 2000 AD #1480-1485, 2006)
  - "Interference" (by writer Gordon Rennie, with art by P. J. Holden, in 2000 AD #1508-1510, 2006)
  - "Walking to Eternity" (by writer Gordon Rennie, with art by P. J. Holden, in 2000 AD prog 2007, 2006)
  - "Grendel" (by writer Gordon Rennie, with art by P. J. Holden, in 2000 AD #1544-1549, 2007)
  - "Under Pressure" (by writer Arthur Wyatt, with art by P. J. Holden, 2000 AD #1625-1630, 2009)

=== Collected editions ===
The stories were collected in a trade paperback:

- The 86ers (96 pages, May 2009, ISBN 1-905437-99-4)
