= Richard Burton (comics) =

British comic editor

- Areas: Writer, Editor, Publisher
- Pseudonym: "Burt"
- Notable works: Comic Media News fanzine Eagle Awards co-founder Editor of 2000 AD.
- Awards: Eagle Award (1977, 1978)

Richard Burton is a British comic publisher and editor who had a lengthy career at IPC Magazines. While an assistant editor at 2000 AD, he became known to readers as Tharg the Mighty's bumbling assistant Burt, who appeared in a number of strips with him. (Burton was later top editor at 2000 AD.) Earlier in his career, Burton published the popular fanzine Comic Media News, and was a co-founder of the Eagle Awards.

== Career ==
=== Comic Media News ===
In 1972, Burton and fellow enthusiast Nick Landau took over a fanzine called Comic Catalog, renaming it Comic Media and establishing the Comic Media brand. Burton and Landau produced a few issues of Comic Media, assisted by Dennis Lee and Tom Downes. In 1973, receiving permission to reprint U.S. comics industry news items from the long-running American comic fanzine The Comic Reader, Burton launched the four-page Comic Media and The Comic Reader Newsletter #1, which eventually came to be known as Comic Media News (CMN).

Meanwhile, Landau produced the 1972 UK Comicon and then branched out to one-day London Comic Marts and direct market distribution. Landau's Comic Media Distribution Service imported American comics from the "big two" publishers DC and Marvel; it later became known as Titan Distributors.

Burton produced Comic Media News from 1973 to 1980, eventually publishing 40 issues. Continuing the fanzine's relationship with The Comic Reader, the first seven issues were titled Comic Media & The Comic Reader UK Edition Newsletter before shortening to Comic Media News. Martin Lock was features editor for CMN from 1973 to 1977, while he was publishing his own comics fanzine, Bemusing Magazine (BEM). CMN had a circulation of close to 2,000 in late 1977, and began to feature art contributions from such established creators as Brian Bolland. With issue #34, the magazine expanded its title to Comic Media News International, reflecting its readership in more than 20 different countries.

In 1977, along with fellow British comics enthusiast Mike Conroy, Burton started the Eagle Awards (voted on by British comics enthusiasts). (Comic Media News won the Eagle Award for Favourite Specialist Comics Publication/Trade Publication in both 1977 and 1978.)

=== 2000 AD ===
After turning down a job offer with DC Comics, Burton was hired as an assistant editor at Marvel UK in March 1978, working for editor Dez Skinn (whom Burton knew from the early days of UK conventions and fanzine publishing). With Skinn, he created the popular character Night Raven, who first appeared in Marvel UK's Hulk Comic #1 (March 7, 1979).

After less than a year at Marvel UK, in March 1979 Burton left for a new job at the weekly comic magazine Tornado, published by IPC Magazines. Tornado only lasted through August 1979, at which point Burton moved to 2000 AD (also published by IPC). At this point, Burton retired Comic Media News, though he continued to co-produce the Eagle Awards for another couple of years with Mike Conroy.

Burton stayed with 2000 AD throughout the 1980s and into the mid-1990s. In 1986 he became editor of Battle. In 1987, IPC's comics line was sold to Robert Maxwell and renamed Fleetway Publications; Burton was at that point promoted to editor of 2000 AD, succeeding Steve MacManus. Egmont UK bought Fleetway from Maxwell in 1991, merging it with their own comics publishing operation, London Editions, to form Fleetway Editions. At that point, Burton took the opportunity to launch the very successful videogame tie-in Sonic the Comic with Fleetway, which lasted nine years (three with him as editor). Notable 2000 AD strips and storylines published under Burton's editorship as Tharg the Mighty include:

- "Democracy," a Judge Dredd storyline inherited from MacManus and published through 1991
- Zenith (Grant Morrison and Steve Yeowell), launched in 1987
- Friday (Dave Gibbons and Will Simpson), launched in 1989
- The Dead Man (John Wagner and John Ridgway), published in 1989–1990
- "Necropolis" (John Wagner and Carlos Ezquerra), 26-part Judge Dredd storyline published in 1990
- Time Flies (Garth Ennis and Philip Bond), launched in 1990
- Finn (Pat Mills), acquired in 1991
- "Judgement Day" (Garth Ennis), published in 1992
- Firekind (John Smith and Paul Marshall), published in 1993

Burton held the editor position at 2000 AD from 1987 to 1994. He then worked on the computer magazine Fun Online.

Burton has since made a career in computers and digital cameras.

== Bibliography ==
- Tharg's Future Shocks: "Galactic Garbage" (with Trevor Goring, in 2000 AD #51, 1978)

Preceded by Steve MacManus	2000 AD editor 1987–1994	Succeeded by Alan McKenzie
