= Really & Truly =

British comic book strip

- Really & Truly on the cover to 2000 AD Prog 845, art by Rian Hughes.

Character information
- First appearance: 2000 AD #842 (1993)
- Created by: Grant Morrison; Rian Hughes

Publication information
- Publisher: IPC Magazines
- Schedule: Weekly
- Formats: Original material for the series has been published as a strip in the comics anthology(s) 2000 AD.
- Genre: Comedy
- Publication date: July – August 1993
- Main character(s): Really Something; Truly Amazing

Creative team
- Writer(s): Grant Morrison
- Artist(s): Rian Hughes
- Editor(s): Tharg (Alan McKenzie)

Reprints
- Collected editions
- Yesterday's Tomorrows: Rian Hughes' Collected Comics: ISBN 9781607063148

Really & Truly is a science fiction comic strip that appeared in the British anthology 2000 AD in 1993, created by Grant Morrison and Rian Hughes. It depicts the travails of the titular characters as they take a shipment of advanced drugs from Colombia to San Francisco in what writer David Quantick has described as a "post-Burgess, post-trance-house future".

== Publication history ==
The story was - along with the Judge Dredd story "Inferno" - Morrison's contribution to new 2000 AD editor Alan McKenzie's "Summer Offensive", an 8-week period where he sat back and let Morrison, Mark Millar and John Smith have free rein. The story was published in 2000 AD Progs 842-849 (3 July to 21 August 1993) - alongside Millar's Maniac 5, Smith's Slaughterbowl and Morrison/Millar collaboration Big Dave.

== Creation ==
Really & Truly dealt explicitly with drugs, and according to Morrison was written in a day while high on ecstasy.

== Synopsis ==
In Teknograd, an enclave of young Russian scientists located in the Colombian jungle, Really and Truly are employed by Dmitri to run a consignment of bullets - a narcotic that can be inserted into the ear, producing "head shooms that last for days". Their destination is an illegal rave in San Francisco, and Dmitri sends Cosmonaut Johnny Zhivago along with them as well. As they reach Panama they are detected by the FBI, who notify Captain Nice, while drug lord Boss Buddha also targets the pair. On a comfort break Truly is nearly attacked by mutants but saved by the awful verse of Beat poet Scuba Trooper, who promptly joins them to get a lift to Mexico, where they are ambushed by the gigantic House of Fun, Nice's huge mobile base. They escape but end up in Anyville, a fifties Americana theme park filled with robots and a lone human, Native American Kicking Bird. They learn Boss Buddha's enforcers are closing in so split up - with Johnny Zhivago and Scuba Trooper heading on to San Francisco while Really and Truly draw them off. The ladies head to a flooded Los Angeles and are attacked by helicopters. They shoot them down but are intercepted by the House of Fun - which has been captured by Johnny and Scuba, with Captain Nice sidelined when he ingests the drug Void. Really, Truly and their motley crew then enjoy the rave.

== Characters ==
- Really Something and Truly Amazing: unflappable ace drivers, crack shots and narcotic enthusiasts.
- Johnny Zhivago:, a Cosmonaut with the strength of ten men, only recently defrosted.
- Scuba Trooper: a Beat poet who is very protective of his goatee.
- Captain Nice: a government drugs agent who travels in the House of Fun, who covers for his baldness by having the word 'hair' written on his forehead
- Boss Buddah: a gangster who is a strong believer in karma.
- Dmitri: a Russian drug-scientist based in Colombia who speaks Nadsat.

== Collected editions ==
| Title | ISBN | Release date |
|---|---|---|
| Yesterday's Tomorrows: Rian Hughes' Collected Comics | 9780861661541 | 12 July 2007 |
| Yesterday's Tomorrows: Rian Hughes' Collected Comics | 9781607063148 | 1 February 2011 |

== Reception ==
Richard Bruton of Comicon.com disliked the story, considering it derivative of the material often seen in Deadline, "packed with drugs and forced wackiness", but was thankful for the "brilliance" of Hughes' art. Comic Book Resources placed it fourth on a list of Morrison's "most controversial stories", calling it a "Class A Josie & the Pussycats" and also noting the similarities to Deadline, particularly Tank Girl., and would also call it "Easy Rider by way of Hanna-Barbera". Graham Johnstone called it "an entertaining romp" while reviewing Yesterday's Tomorrows: Rian Hughes' Collected Comics for Slings & Arrows.

Morrison themselves would note "Really & Truly is no award-winner but it has a certain throwaway charm", and would later admit the story was heavily influenced by Deadline.
