= Pussyfoot 5 =

- Cover to reprint volume from Judge Dredd Megazine #281. Art by Doug A. Gregory
- Created by: John Smith; Steve Yeowell

Publication information
- Publisher: Originally IPC Media (Fleetway) until 1999, thereafter Rebellion Developments
- Schedule: Weekly
Title(s)
2000 AD
- Genre: Science fiction
- Publication date: 1999–2001
- Main character(s): Pussy Willow, Lucy Melmoth, Shatterface, Mantissa, and Chubby Behemoth.

Creative team
- Writer(s): John Smith
- Artist(s): Steve Yeowell; Nigel Raynor
- Letterer(s): Tom Frame
- Colourist(s): D'Israeli; Chris Blythe
- Editor(s): Tharg (David Bishop); Tharg (Andy Diggle)

Pussyfoot 5 is a series from the British comic anthology 2000 AD about a crack team of deep-cover occult agents working for the Vatican to protect the Earth from paranormal threats. It was created by John Smith and Steve Yeowell. It is a spin-off of Smith's own Devlin Waugh and exists in the same fictional universe as Judge Dredd. The colourist D'Israeli has described it as containing "John Smith's trademark mix of sex, religion and weird alien biology".

== Development and description ==
The team consists of world grid technician and ultravixen Pussy Willow, the techno-shaman Lucy Melmoth and her demon familiar Shatterface (Exu in ectoplasm spirit form), the insectoid were-shaper Mantissa, and the tactical specialist Chubby Behemoth, a born-again Christian possessed by spirit the serial killer Son of Sam.

Pussyfoot 5 first appear in the Devlin Waugh stories “Sirius Rising” and “Reign of Frogs” when they enlist Devlin Waugh to help find and recover the Herod, an apocalyptically dangerous stolen artefact. Smith wrote the first spin-off entry as a comparatively short five-issue story to introduce the characters and concepts and test the water for a series. In "Fast Breeder" the team travel into space to rescue Mantissa from capture. Only one other story appeared after it.

Mr Vathek, Mantissa's torturer in "Fast Breeder" is a member of a cloven-hoofed species called the Chadarisq-Khan, another one of whom appears in John Smith's Firekind.

D'Israeli has expressed disappointment in his work on Pussyfoot 5, initially delivering a "colouring job inspired by Austin Powers, only to discover editor David Bishop had been thinking The Matrix".

== Publications ==
- "Fast Breeder" (art by Nigel Raynor, in 2000 AD, #1184-1188, 2000, reprinted in Judge Dredd Megazine, #281, 2009)
- "Alien Sex Fiend!"" (art by Steve Yeowell, in 2000 AD, #1251-1256, 2001, reprinted in Judge Dredd Megazine, #281, 2009)
