= The Liberators (comic) =

Comic strip published by Quality Communications

- Shanni of the Liberators on the cover of Warrior #22; art by Geoff Senior.

Publication information
- Publisher: Quality Communications
- First appearance: Warrior #22 (September 1984)
- Created by: Dez Skinn; John Ridgway
The Liberators
Creative team
- Written by: Dez Skinn; Grant Morrison
- Artist(s): John Ridgway

The Liberators was a science fiction comic book story based on concepts created by Dez Skinn and Will Simpson for the British anthology title Warrior. It was among the first mainstream comic strips written by Grant Morrison.

== Creation and publication ==
The series was intended as a far-future continuation of Skinn's proposed shared continuity 'Warrior-verse', established in the Big Ben strip which also ran in Warrior. The Liberators first featured in Warrior #22, cover dated September 1984 in a stand-alone story called "Death Run", written by Skinn himself and drawn by John Ridgway, the scripting of the series was handed over to Grant Morrison. Morrison's first 5-page installment, "Night Moves", saw publication in Warrior #26, which would be the final issue of the series Unusually, "Night Moves" was a prequel to "Death Run".

After Quality Communications took over Fleetway's overseas licence from Eagle Comics, Skinn announced a Liberators series in 1986. However, the title would not appear.

In 1996 a previously unpublished Liberators strip by Morrison and Ridgway, "Angels and Demons", was published alongside a reprint of "Night Moves" in the Warrior Spring Special, issued as a flipbook with Comics International #67. The introduction for the story claimed Bogey also shared a timeline with The Liberators and Big Ben.

== Plot ==
In 2470, London has been devastated by shape-shifting aliens called Metamorphs, who have the technology to turn captive humans into superpowered, mindless Wardroids. Kris leads a misfit band of superhumans to one of the Metamorph's ships, but the mission is compromised when one of their members is revealed to be a Metamorph, and he is captured After the disastrous guerilla assault on one of the invaders' living ships, the protagonists are attacked by the unstoppable Wardroids. Meanwhile, in the ruins of the Houses of Parliament, secrets are unearthed that may be the key to understanding the aliens' true motives. Kris' telepathic sister Shanni leads a desperate assault to prevent her brother being converted into a Wardroid, ending with both groups dying in an explosion.
