= Mick Austin =

British comics artist

- Born: Michael J. Austin
- Areas: Penciler, Inker

Michael J. Austin is a fine artist who lives and works in the UK. Initially a comic book artist and illustrator, his painterly style led to him leaving this genre and concentrating on fine art in 1996.

== Biography ==
Mick Austin started his artistic career in 1981 for Marvel Comics producing cover art and a very brief 'Timesmasher' (written by the then editor Paul Neary) series and also Blakes Seven before moving onto Warrior mainly painting cover art for which he won an Eagle Award in 1982 for his Marvelman cover. He then drew both Judge Dredd and Judge Anderson for 2000 AD between 1989 and 1995. He also drew the computer game based strip Urban Strike during this period, various Tharg's Future Shocks and the featured strip in Doctor Who Magazine during this period.

He also worked for several other publications up to 1996, notably as features artist for The Sunday Times from 1982 to 1985; illustrating stories for the magazines Men Only, Mayfair, the TV Times as well as many book covers and several film posters. Some of his last comic work was for Fleetway's Teenage Mutant Ninja Turtles in the early 1990s and a final stint on 2000 AD and Judge Dredd before he was offered his first one-man (fine art) show at Jonathan Cooper's Park Walk Gallery in October 1997. He is represented by J Cooper at most major art fairs in the UK as well as in the US and Germany and is represented in the southern hemisphere by the Everard Read Gallery of South Africa.

In 2003 he accompanied the Prince of Wales as tour artist to India and Oman.

His last two exhibitions of 2006 and 2007 concentrated on the Toro Bravo, or ‘fighting bull’, painted not from the bull-ring but in the sierras of southern Spain.

His work has been reproduced as open and limited edition prints by The Art Group of London.

== Bibliography ==
- Doctor Who:
  - "Skywatch-7" (with Steve Parkhouse, in Doctor Who Monthly #58 and the Doctor Who Winter Special 1981)
  - The Tides of Time (with, Steve Parkhouse, 212 pages, 2005, ISBN 1-904159-92-3) collects:
    - "The Stockbridge Horror" (in Doctor Who Monthly #70-75)
    - "Lunar Lagoon" (in Doctor Who Monthly #76-77)
    - "4-Dimensional Vistas" (in Doctor Who Monthly #78-83)
- The Madman (with Paul Neary, in Warrior, 1982)
- Judge Anderson (with Alan Grant):
  - "Beyond the Void" (in 2000 AD #612-613, 1989)
  - "Judge Corey - Leviathan's Farewell" (in 2000 AD Sci-Fi Special 1989)
  - "Confessions of a She-Devil" (in 2000 AD Annual 1990, 1989)
- Tales of the Doghouse (with Stewart Edwards):
  - "Froggy Natterjack" (in 2000 AD #625, 1989)
  - "Ratty" (in 2000 AD #626, 1989)
- Judge Dredd:
  - "An Elm Street Nightmare" (with John Wagner, in 2000 AD #635, 1989)
  - "Curse of the Spider Man" (with John Wagner, in 2000 AD #639, 1989)
  - "Birdman" (with John Wagner, in Judge Dredd Mega Special 1989)
  - "The Chieftain" (with Garth Ennis, in 2000 AD #832-834, 1993)
  - "Tough Justice" (with Mark Millar, in 2000 AD #840, 1993)
  - "Manchu Candidate" (with Alan McKenzie, in 2000 AD #881-883, 1994)
  - "Wilderlands" (with John Wagner, in 2000 AD #904-914, 1994)
  - "The Candidates" (with John Wagner, in 2000 AD #916-917, 1994)
  - "Crusade" (with Grant Morrison and Mark Millar, in 2000 AD #928-937, 1995)
- Tharg's Future Shocks:
  - "Opening Moves" (with John Smith, in 2000 AD #629, 1989)
  - "It's Alive!" (with John Tomlinson, in 2000 AD #717, 1991)
  - "Holiday of a Lifetime" ((with Paul Carstairs, in 2000 AD #746, 1991)
- Tharg's Terror Tales (with Alan McKenzie):
  - "The Last Victim" (in 2000 AD #840, 1993)
  - "Meat is Meat" (in 2000 AD Yearbook 1994), 1993)
- Indigo Prime: "The Loa in the Machine" (illustrated text story, with John Smith, in 2000AD Winter Special 1992)
- Urban Strike (with Steve White/Anthony Williams, in 2000 AD #950-955, 1995)
- Vector 13: "Case Four: Parts and Labour" (with Dan Abnett, in 2000 AD #991, 1996)

== Exhibitions ==
- 1996
  - The London Contemporary Art Fair - Art96, London
- 1997
  - One-man show at Jonathan Cooper, Park Walk Gallery, London
  - The London Contemporary Art Fair - Art97, London
- 1998
  - The London Contemporary Art Fair - Art98, London
- 1999
  - One-man show at Jonathan Cooper, Park Walk Gallery, London
  - The London Contemporary Art Fair - Art99, London
- 2001
  - One-man show at Jonathan Cooper, Park Walk Gallery, London
  - The London Contemporary Art Fair - Art2001, London
  - ArtLondon art fair, Duke of York's, London
  - The painting ‘Head’ was chosen to represent and advertise the Hunting Art Prize.
- 2002
  - One-man show at Jonathan Cooper, Park Walk Gallery, London
  - The London Contemporary Art Fair -Art2002, London
  - ArtLondon art fair, Duke of York's, London
  - Paintings become available as prints and cards – printed by the Art Group.
- 2003
  - The London Contemporary Art Fair - Art2003
  - ArtLondon art fair, Burton's Court, London
  - One-man show at Jonathan Cooper, Park Walk Gallery, London
  - Tour Artist for the Prince of Wales – India and Oman
- 2004
  - LondonArtFair (art2004) – Jonathan Cooper, London
  - ArtLondon art fair, Burton's Court, London – One-man show of Indian & Oman
  - One-man show at Jonathan Cooper, Park Walk Gallery, London
- 2005
  - LondonArtFair – Jonathan Cooper, Park Walk Gallery, London
  - ArtLondon art fair, Burton's Court – Jonathan Cooper, Park Walk Gallery, London
