= List of minor 2000 AD stories =

2000 AD is a weekly British science fiction-oriented comic magazine first published in 1977, which serialises stories in each issue. Although most noted for its Judge Dredd stories, it has published many others.

== Stories ==
=== A ===
==== Absalom ====
Absalom is a horror story spin-off from Caballistics, Inc. by Gordon Rennie and Tiernen Trevallion.

The stories were "Noblesse Obligie" in 2000 AD #1732–1739 (May–June 2011), "Sick Leave" in 2000 AD Prog 2012 (December 2011), "Ghosts of London" in 2000 AD #1765–1771 (January–February 2012), "Dirty Postcards" in Prog 2013 (December 2014), "Old Pals' Act" in Prog 2014 (December 2013), "Under a False Flag" in #1934–1942 (June–August 2015), "Family Snapshots" in #1961 (December 2015), and "Terminal Diagnosis" in #2053–2060 and #2136–2143 (October–December 2017 and June–August 2019).

The first trade paperback, Ghosts of London, was published in June 2012 (ISBN 1781080429).

==== Ampney Crucis Investigates ====
Ampney Crucis Investigates is an occult detective story by Ian Edginton and Simon Davis starring the fictional investigator Ampney Crucis and his man servant Eddie Cromwell. It started in 2000 AD #1611 (2008) and up to the end of 2011 has spanned four parts.

The first trade paperback, Vile Bodies, was published in January 2012 (ISBN 1907992944).

=== B ===
==== Babe Race 2000 ====
Babe Race 2000 is a story written by Mark Millar, with art by Anthony Williams, which ran in an eponymous story in 2000 AD #883-888 (1994) and a one-off, "Bounty Hunter Mom", in the 1995 2000 AD Yearbook.

==== Bato Loco ====
Bato Loco is a story written by Gordon Rennie, with art by Simon Coleby that had two outings in the Judge Dredd Megazine. It features Carlito "Bato Loco" Agarra from the Barrio Blocks who was introduced in the story "Bato Loco" in Judge Dredd Megazine #202 (February 2003).

=== C ===
==== Carver Hale ====
Carver Hale is a story about a London mobster possessed by a demon. It was written by Mike Carey with art by Mike Perkins (with some fill-in inking by Dylan Teague). It came about because then editor Andy Diggle was commissioning more horror stories and Carey said he "was aiming to get some of the flavour of Hellblazer, but in a more in-your-face, action-oriented story."

It was published in 2000 AD #1236-1240 and 1247–1249 in 2001 (split because of deadline problems), and collected into a hardback volume in 2005 (ISBN 1-904265-62-6).

==== Citi-Def ====
Citi-Def by Tony Lee, with art by Jack Lawrence. The series is set in the Judge Dredd universe, focusing on the City Defence units of armed militia. The first instalment has been described as a good start with "cute" and "cartoony" art, and the second part as "an awesome romp" and "a fabulous idea, and here it's executed with great aplomb," although the same reviewer felt it was pitched at a younger audience than usual. Another reviewer felt that while the artist "is pretty good at this sort of art, but I hate it" and reiterated concerns about the lack of sophistication but did acknowledge that "there are bags of fun ideas here."

The first story, "Field Trip", ran in Judge Dredd Megazine starting in issue #279.

==== Cradlegrave ====
Cradlegrave is a body horror comic story which ran in 2000 AD #1633-1644, written by John Smith, with art by Edmund Bagwell.

It is set in the Ravenglade Estate (nicknamed "Cradlegrave"), somewhere in Lancashire. It follows the story of teenage Shane Holt, who has recently been released from Thorn Hill young offenders institution.

The story was collected into a trade paperback, with a foreword by Ramsey Campbell (ISBN 1907992464). In his foreword Campbell describes the story as one "as simultaneously hideous and desolate as anything in David Cronenberg".

==== Cursed Earth Koburn ====
Cursed Earth Koburn is a character who has appeared in an eponymous series in Judge Dredd Megazine, written by Gordon Rennie, with art by Carlos Ezquerra. It is about a judge who has taken the Long Walk into the Cursed Earth. A Judge who looks a lot like Major Eazy. A character from Battle ( a 1970s Comic ) who Ezquerra drew much like James Coburn

=== D ===
==== Dinosty ====
Dinosty was the first series Pat Mills and Clint Langley had collaborated on (Langley's first job at 2000 AD had been a Future Shock with Mills) and they would go on to work together on Mills' long-running stories ABC Warriors and Sláine.

The story, featuring anthropomorphic dinosaurs, was originally supposed to appear in the spin-off comic Earthside 8, but this title was never published. However, this was not the end of the problems as the move to 2000 AD happened when Mills felt his relationship with the editors was breaking down and he came to believe that "Dinosty suffered from covert and non-verbalised editorial opposition, or maybe just disinterest." The story would eventually run in 1994, in issues #873 - 882.

==== Doctor Sin ====
Doctor Sin was originally created by writer Pat Mills; the character first appeared in the 1979 2000 AD AnnuaL and has made only sporadic appearances since.

In early planning for 2000 AD, Mills devised an occultist character called Judge Dread (named after the reggae artist) who would star in a mystical strip called "Black Magic". However, as 2000 AD developed into more of a science fiction during planning the character was dropped. At the suggestion of editor Kelvin Gosnell, the name was modified to Judge Dredd and used for another 2000 AD character, a futuristic lawman devised by John Wagner. Some time later, with 2000 AD firmly launched, Mills revisited the idea and reworked it as Doctor Sin.

A single strip featuring Doctor Sin appeared in the 1979 2000 AD Annual, written by Mills and with art by Horacio Lalia. No further appearances followed until 1992, when a revamped version appeared in the 2000 AD Action Special, which features several re-imaginings of extant Fleetway Publications characters. This version was written by John Smith and John M. Burns, and looked considerably different, leading to some confusion as to whether they were intended to be the same character.

Doctor Sin then undertook another long hiatus before returning in the 2017 one-shot Scream and Misty Halloween Special, where his spirit appeared to transfer his powers to his grandson, and resembled the 1979 version. His grandson, the hip-hop artist Sin Tax, became the new Doctor Sin, a change written by Rob Williams and with a redesign by Luca Pizzari. The character was now owned by Rebellion Developments, and the new Doctor Sin was then part of their super-team the Vigilant. The original version's debut appearance was reprinted in The Vigilant: Origins, a pack-in comic included with Judge Dredd Megazine #421. Mills would complain he was not paid or credited for the use of Doctor Sin by Rebellion.

=== G ===
==== Glimmer Rats ====
Glimmer Rats is a military science fiction story which appeared in 2000 AD, written by Gordon Rennie, with art by Mark Harrison. It was collected into a sixty-page hardcover (ISBN 1904265006). Rennie has described the inspiration for the story as "Sven Hassel novels and a certain oblique pretentiousness."

==== The Grudge-Father ====
The Grudge-Father is a "lurid" 1994 story written by Mark Millar, with Jim McCarthy providing the art, which ran in 2000 AD #878-883.

=== I ===
==== Insurrection ====
Insurrection is a series by Dan Abnett published in Judge Dredd Megazine starting in January 2009. Abnett explains that "the actual brief was to bring to the Dredd Universe something of the epic war-in-space scale of the stuff I write for Warhammer 40K. Tharg (Matt to his friends) wanted a stonking big space war story that would suit the universe of the Mega-Cities".

The series was drawn by artist Colin MacNeil, who has also worked on a number of Warhammer 40K stories, and one reviewer notes the similarities suggesting "MacNeil is reprising exactly the same art style that he used on the "Bloodquest" strip in the Warhammer Monthly comic."

The reception has been positive with reviews of the first episode suggesting "With cracking art and a storming first episode I have to say ‘Insurrection’ has the potential to be the best Dredd off world spin-off ever" and "This was as good a first episode as I can remember reading and I can see Insurrection having the legs to deliver on that initial promise." Reviews only got better after that, including: "Quite simply, this is the best non-Dredd story ever to run in the Megazine" and "glorious"

A sequel series entitled "Lawless" was later published in Judge Dredd Megazine.

The first two instalment are being collected into a trade paperback (ISBN 1907992499).

=== J ===
==== Journal of Luke Kirby ====
The Journal of Luke Kirby is a long-running series, first appearing in 1988 and published until 1995. It was written by Alan McKenzie and has art by John Ridgway, Steve Parkhouse and Graham Higgins. Luke Kirby predates other boy wizards, such as Harry Potter and the Vertigo character Timothy Hunter.

=== M ===
==== Maniac 5 ====
Maniac 5 was, along with Red Razors, one of Mark Millar's major solo series at 2000 AD, the others being co-written with Grant Morrison. It formed part of the "Summer Offensive" in 1993, along with Judge Dredd: "Inferno", Slaughterbowl, Really & Truly and Big Dave. The initial, eponymous story was drawn by Red Razors artist Steve Yeowell, who would also draw the final story "Maniac 6". Other artists worked on the one-offs: David Hine on "War Journal", in 2000 AD Sci-Fi Special 1993, and Richard Elson on "Maniac 6 Prologue", in 2000 AD Winter Special 1993.

=== N ===
==== Necrophim ====
Necrophim is a story by Tony Lee, with art by Lee Carter. The prologue ran in 2000 AD #1628-1632, with the main story starting in #1655.

=== P ===
==== Pulp Sci-fi ====
Pulp Sci-fi is another Future Shock-style series, designed by David Bishop to replace Vector 13. It would be the launch pad for other series like Rose O'Rion but failed to prove popular with writers and ended two years after it started.

==== Purgatory ====
Purgatory is a Judge Dredd spin-off that focuses on Judge Grice, written by Mark Millar, with art by Carlos Ezquerra. The series ran in 2000 AD #834-841 in 1993 and led straight into up the Judge Dredd story "Inferno", with Ezquerra remaining on art and Grant Morrison taking over writing duties.

=== R ===
==== Rain Dogs ====
Rain Dogs is a science fiction story set in a flooded New York, which appeared in 2000 AD progs 1213–1222. Written by Gordon Rennie, with art by Colin Wilson, it was later collected into a fifty-two page hardcover.

==== Rose O'Rion ====
Rose O'Rion spun out of Pulp Sci-fi, was written by Kek-W, with art by Andy Clarke. The character returned in the 2000 AD fanzine Zarjaz #10 as an illustrated text story, with art from Dylan Teague.

=== S ===
==== Sancho Panzer ====
Sancho Panzer is a story which ran in seven consecutive stories in 2000 AD #1112-1123 in 1998. It was written by Dan Abnett, with Henry Flint providing the art, and features the eponymous character, who pilots a giant tank called Mojo with the assistance of his technician Tool. He is pursued by reporter Lynx Fahren/Farren, (Note: Lynx's surname is spelled differently at various points throughout the story) who is trying to get to the truth behind the legend, and General Herman Spurn, who was defeated by Panzer and is looking for revenge. Everyone has to pull together when the planet, Vainglory Five, is invaded by giant worms.

Abnett had tried to repeat the success of Sinister Dexter by seeing what worked and basing another story on those elements:

I looked at what was popular with Sinister Dexter - extreme violence and witty dialogue, catchphrases galore and as many puns as you can fit in. Then I added heavy artillery action, something Henry did well. It should have been a blast, but wasn't popular... I assume Sancho's failure was due entirely to the strength of the story, because the art was so good.

==== Silo ====
Silo was Mark Millar's first series at 2000 AD which was greenlit after he had had just two Future Shocks published. It was drawn by Dave D'Antiquis and ran in issues #706-711 in 1990 and was reprinted in Extreme Edition #14 and involved two American soldiers in a nuclear missile silo apparently haunted by the ghost of Edward Bulwer-Lytton who was intent on ending the world.

==== Slaughterbowl ====
Slaughterbowl is a story by John Smith and Paul Peart that ran in 2000 AD #842-849 as part of their "Summer Offensive". It features convicts piloting cybernetic dinosaurs as a sport of the future.

==== Snow/Tiger ====
Snow/Tiger is a story featuring "a mixture of paranoid politics and extreme violence" written by Andy Diggle: originally pitched to Vertigo, it was turned down as being "too mainstream". He reworked it, "I just took out the politics and left in the extreme violence", but the politics that remained still proved controversial, although Diggle concludes that "the fact the story pissed people off on both sides of the political spectrum suggest I probably pitched it about right."

Only one story was published, "Pax Americana", in 2000 AD ##1336-1342 and it was collected in a free trade paperback given away in the Judge Dredd Megazine #276.

==== Stalag 666 ====
Stalag #666 is a fifteen-part story, with a double-length (ten page) first instalment, by Tony Lee, with art by Jon Davis-Hunt. Lee describes it as "a futuristic space story that happens to be set in a prison camp. and it's (and I'll be honest here) a mash of clichés and homages as let's be truthful here, you couldn't do a prison camp story and not be like that."

The story ran in 2000 AD #1600-1614, between August and November 2008.

=== T ===
==== Tales from Beyond Science ====
Tales from Beyond Science is a series of one-off Future Shock-style stories all drawn by Rian Hughes with scripts by Mark Millar, Alan McKenzie and John Smith. The story was devised by Millar and then-editor McKenzie who brought Smith and Hughes in as the last members of the team. The series was published in 1992 in 2000 AD #774-779 and as part of a couple of special issues. Hughes has had these stories collected, along with new material, by Image Comics (ISBN 1607064715).

==== Thirteen ====
Thirteen is a one-off story written by Mike Carey, with art by Andy Clarke. The story had been on Carey's mind for seven years before appearing in the comic. The writer has said "I wanted to do a story that was an insane, over-the-top space opera combined with the seventies paranoid thriller. I also had this idea for a narrative structure that would start small and then just keep on opening outwards like Chinese boxes until it was working on a cosmic level"

The story appeared in 2002 in 2000 AD #1289-1299 and has been collected into a trade paperback (ISBN 1-904265-36-7)

==== Tyranny Rex ====
Tyranny Rex is a story by John Smith and Steve Dillon. The main character is an artist and reptile, whose story crossed over with Indigo Prime. The stories appeared between 1988 and 1994, with a number of artists including Will Simpson, Dougie Braithwaite, Steve Sampson, Duncan Fegredo, Mark Buckingham, Paul Marshall and Richard Elson, and the character made a comeback in 2004, with Steve Yeowell on art duties but no further stories appeared.

=== W ===
==== Witch World ====
Witch World is a series that appeared twice in 2000 AD, written by Gordon Rennie, with art provided by Siku, Paul Johnson, Will Simpson and John M. Burns.

Rennie describes the origins of the story (one of his first in 2000 AD after stories being published in Judge Dredd Megazine): "It came about when I and a number of other writers were asked to put together pitches for a new fantasy strip, with guidelines suggested by the editor". However, he does not rate the story highly:

I didn't think my idea was much cop when I came up with it, I still didn't think much of it when I pitched it, and I absolutely fucking hated it while I was writing it. [...] Chopping and changing artists every few episodes didn't help, but the fact that the series was generally just crap to begin with was probably the biggest drawback. Of everything I've ever written, Witch World is easily the one thing I wish I hadn't done. One or two Vector 13s aside, it was the first thing I did for 2000 AD, a comic that's been part of my life for 25 years, and the fact that it was hackneyed old rubbish is still a source of eternal mortification.

=== Z ===
==== Zombo ====
Zombo is a story written by Al Ewing, based on ideas by series artist Henry Flint, who also provided the art. The first series was set on a "death planet", one of a number of hostile and malevolent living planets, where the eponymous character has to lead the passengers of a crashed space ship to safety.

Zombo first appeared in 2000 AD #1632.

== See also ==
- List of 2000 AD stories
