= The Dead Man =

Sci-fi comic strip by John Wagner and John Ridgway

- The Dead Man (foreground) and Yassa (drawn by John Ridgway)
- Publisher: Fleetway Publications
- Publication date: 28 October 1989 – 20 January 1990
- Genre: Science fiction
- Title(s): 2000 AD prog 650–662

Creative team
- Writer: John Wagner
- Artist: John Ridgway
- Editor: Tharg (Richard Burton)
- The Dead Man: ISBN 978-1-906735-19-7

The Dead Man was a science fiction strip in the British comic 2000 AD by writer John Wagner and artist John Ridgway, published in black and white in 1989–90. Although it was not billed as a Judge Dredd story, it featured Dredd as the amnesiac protagonist known only as the Dead Man. It was part of a series of stories that set the scene for the main Judge Dredd story of 1990, "Necropolis".

== Plot ==
The story is told from the point of view of Yassa Povey, a young boy living in a post-apocalyptic wasteland. Yassa discovers the body of a man with appalling injuries caused by acid burns, leaving him so badly disfigured that he effectively has no face left. At first believing the man to be dead, Yassa is startled when the man regains consciousness, and he runs home to get help. The townsfolk collect the injured man and take him back with them, fully expecting him to die during the night, but he survives. When he has finally recovered enough to talk, it transpires that the mental trauma caused by his injuries has caused him to lose his memory, and he has no idea of who he is. Therefore, Yassa nicknames him "Dead Man", and for want of a better alternative the name sticks.

Once the Dead Man has finished recuperating, he resolves to set out on his own and retrace his steps in an effort to find out who he was. Yassa's father gives him a rifle and some clothes: a brown overcoat and a wide-brimmed hat, giving him the appearance of a character from a Western. The Dead Man sets out alone, but is followed by Yassa and his dog. When the Dead Man discovers Yassa, he forbids him to accompany him any further due to the exceptionally dangerous terrain they will be passing through, but Yassa disobeys and the Dead Man gives up trying to stop him.

The rest of the story tells of their hazardous journey through the wasteland, during which they are attacked by various hostile inhabitants. Throughout the story the Dead Man is plagued by enigmatic nightmares and half-memories of the circumstances of his near-fatal injuries. During a kidnap attempt by mutants seeking food, it is established that the Dead Man is highly proficient with the rifle, and at tracking.

During their journey they not only encounter mutants, but also are occasionally visited by a strange, supernatural presence: a woman dressed in black. At first beautiful, she later transforms into a terrifying monster before disappearing.

Eventually the pair reach a river of acid, where the Dead Man finds traces of the clothing he was wearing when Yassa first found him. His memory slowly begins to return as he recalls running through the river, pursued by an unseen foe, and then losing his footing and falling into the acid. Soon after they reach a small town called Crowley, where they both sense the presence of some great evil and Yassa's dog refuses to go any further. Entering the town, they find the whole place has been burned down, and the streets littered with corpses. There are no survivors.

The Dead Man discovers more artefacts which belonged to him and which help to jog his memory: a wrecked motorbike, an irreparably damaged handgun, and pieces of an old uniform, including a badge. As the memory of his identity finally returns, the Dead Man shows Yassa the name on the badge: Dredd. The Dead Man recalls that he resigned from the Justice Department and took the Long Walk into the Cursed Earth, leaving Mega-City One behind for ever. After one hundred days of bringing law to the lawless outside the city walls, he reached Crowley, where he was attacked by the Sisters of Death, who incinerated everyone, chased him into the acid river and left him for dead.

At the very moment of this revelation, the two Sisters of Death – Nausea and Phobia – manifest themselves in their hideous true forms, and burn Yassa's eyeballs out of his skull. They try to kill Dredd, but this time Dredd realises what he did not understand before: the Sisters are not physically present, but are only psionic projections, illusions which can only harm him if he believes they can. By refusing to believe they can hurt him, Dredd survives their assault, but Yassa is too terrified to heed his warning and is therefore blinded.

Once the Sisters have vanished, Dredd takes Yassa back home, where he is denounced by Yassa's mother for allowing her son to be exposed to such peril. Dredd is remorseful, realising too late that he should have done more to stop Yassa from following him in the first place. However he must travel to Mega-City One to investigate what is happening there, since if the evil Dark Judges have returned then the whole city is at risk.

Left behind, Yassa struggles to cope not only with his blindness, but also with the nightmares about that fateful encounter which wake him screaming every night. Unable to forget that terrible day, he becomes envious of the Dead Man's loss of memory, wishing that he could forget too.

== Significance ==
The Dead Man was a major event in the history of the Judge Dredd strip, as it heralded the onset of the 26-episode epic "Necropolis" in 1990. To preserve the mystery of the Dead Man story, writer John Wagner used a pseudonym, Keef Ripley, to disguise the fact that a high-profile creator strongly associated with Judge Dredd had written it. It was also not made explicit that the story was set in Dredd's universe until the eleventh episode, in which the revelation of the Dead Man's true identity occurred.

The Dead Man was immediately followed in the regular Judge Dredd strip by a prequel, "Tale of the Dead Man", told almost entirely in flashback, which recounted how and why Dredd resigned and took the Long Walk. This was then followed by the five-episode "Countdown to Necropolis" which set the scene for "Necropolis" proper. "Necropolis" and its numerous prologues and epilogues brought together and resolved hitherto separate plot threads that had been running through the Judge Dredd strip for the preceding four years, and collectively had repercussions that were still being felt another four years later, ending at the conclusion of the "Mechanismo" storyline.

The Dead Man contained a rare depiction of Judge Dredd in which he is not wearing his features-obscuring helmet, although he is instead disfigured by his earlier falling into an acid river.

== Tale of the Dead Man ==
"Judge Dredd: Tale of the Dead Man"
- Publisher: Fleetway Publications
- Publication date: 20 January – 3 March 1990
- Title(s): 2000 AD #662–668

Creative team
- Writer: John Wagner
- Artist(s): Will Simpson, Jeff Anderson
- Editor: Tharg (Richard Burton)
- Judge Dredd: The Complete Casefiles 14: ISBN 978-1-906735-29-6

As soon as The Dead Man finished, "Tale of the Dead Man" began in the same issue (by Wagner and artists Will Simpson and Jeff Anderson). It was preceded by a one-episode prologue, "A Letter to Judge Dredd" by Wagner and Simpson, a story which also had a significant impact on the events which unfolded in the "Tale of the Dead Man".

Besides its immediate importance in the build-up to "Necropolis", the story also features Dredd's resignation from the force, and the death of his mentor, Judge Morphy. It significantly developed the supporting character Judge Kraken, who was to have a major role in "Necropolis". Its epilogue, "By Lethal Injection", saw Kraken being ordered to impersonate Dredd to cover up Dredd's resignation, a deception which ultimately was instrumental in bringing about the conquest of Mega-City One and the deaths of over 60 million people.

== Follow-up stories ==
Following "Necropolis", the Judge Dredd story "Nightmares" (2000 AD progs 702–706) saw Yassa Povey brought to Mega-City One by Judge Dredd, where Dr Zilton Northgate, the city's best eye surgeon, fits him with bionic eyes, while Judge Anderson uses her telepathic abilities to ease his mental trauma. During his treatment, Yassa is kidnapped and rescued by Dredd. In the later story "Death Aid" (2000 AD progs 711–715, 719–720), Yassa is almost assassinated by a sniper as he boards his flight home; Dr Northgate intercepts the bullet and is killed.

== Publication ==
- The Dead Man first appeared in 2000 AD #650-662. It has been collected in trade paperbacks three times:
  - By Titan Books, 1991 (ISBN 1-85286-381-1)
  - By Rebellion Developments, 2009 (ISBN 978-1-906735-19-7)
  - By Hachette Partworks in volume 21 of Judge Dredd: The Mega Collection, 2015
- Judge Dredd: "Tale of the Dead Man" first appeared in 2000 AD #662-668. It was collected in Necropolis Book One and Judge Dredd: The Complete Casefiles 14, but it has also had its own release:
  - Judge Dredd: Tale of the Dead Man (by John Wagner, Fleetway, July 1991, ISBN 1-85386-245-2):
    - "A Letter to Judge Dredd" (with Will Simpson, in 2000 AD #661, 1990)
    - "Tale of the Dead Man" (with Will Simpson (1–4) and Jeff Anderson (5–7), in 2000 AD #662-668, 1990)
  - It was also collected in volume 21 of the Mega Collection (see above).

| Preceded by Oz | Major Judge Dredd stories 1989–90 | Succeeded by Necropolis |
