= Black Axe =

Black Axe may refer to:

- Black Axe (organized crime group), a Nigerian international criminal organization
- Black Axe (comic book), a comic book series published by Marvel UK
- Mouse Guard: Black Axe, a Mouse Guard comic book mini-series
