= Cliff Robinson (artist) =

British comic book artist (born 1962)

- Born: 1962 (age 63–64)
- Areas: Penciller; Inker

Cliff Robinson is a British comic book artist, probably best known for his cover work on 2000 AD, and contributions to the Judge Dredd strip.

== Biography ==
Clifford Robinson was raised in Gorleston-on-Sea, Norfolk, England.

Robinson has an extremely precise inking style which is extremely well suited to producing detailed, composed single images for cover art. But his strip work has also been praised highly by, among others, Gordon Rennie. This excerpt from a 2004 interview demonstrates the regard in which Robinson’s art is held by the 2000 AD writers:

Q - "Have you ever had an artist turn in something, and thought ‘Oh No! What have they done?!"
A - "Yeah, but what can you do? The reverse happens too, of course. You turn in a script you maybe didn't think was so great, and the artist really brings it to life. That happened on a Dredd story I did called 'Couch Potatoes'. I quite liked it, but I thought there were too many corny lines in it about mashed potatoes. Cliff Robinson did an incredible job on it, though, and people absolutely loved it."

Robinson’s strip work outside Judge Dredd has been quite limited, though he did create the strip Mother Earth with Bernie Jaye.

== Bibliography ==
- Judge Dredd:
  - "Block Rite" ( with John Wagner and Alan Grant as T.B. Grover, in "2000AD" #489, 1986)
  - "A Real Xmas Story" ( with John Wagner and Alan Grant, in "2000AD" #502, 1986)
  - "First of the Many" (with Garth Ennis and Gina Hart, in 2000 AD #775, 1992)
- Mother Earth (with co-authors Paul Neary and Jaye, in 2000 AD #867-872, 1993)
- Vector 13:
  - "Case Three: Graven Images" (with John Smith, in 2000 AD #1064, 1997)
  - "Case Eleven: Search & Rescue" (with Gordon Rennie, in 2000 AD #1072, 1997)
  - "Divine Fury" (with Lee Marks, in 2000 AD #1117, 1998)
- Pulp Sci-Fi:
  - "Eggs is Eggs" (with Mike Carey, in 2000 AD #1145, 1999)
  - "War of Words" (with Robbie Morrison, in 2000 AD #1159, 1999)
- Terror Tales: "Futurity" (with Arthur Wyatt, in 2000 AD #1599, 2008)
