= Scarab (Vertigo) =

- Cover of Scarab #1, art by Glenn Fabry.

Publication information
- Publisher: Vertigo
- Schedule: Monthly
- Format: Limited series
- Genre: Superhero
- Publication date: November 1993 – June 1994
- No. of issues: 8
- Main character: Scarab (Louis Sendak)

Creative team
- Written by: John Smith
- Penciller: Scot Eaton
- Inker: Mike Barreiro
- Letterer: Clem Robins
- Colorist: Stuart Chaifetz
- Editor(s): Stuart Moore; Julie Rottenberg

Scarab is an American comic book limited series written by John Smith and published by the Vertigo imprint of DC Comics, featuring a superhero called Scarab.

It ran for only eight issues between November 1993 and June 1994, although the character later reappeared in DC's Justice Society of America series.

== Fictional character biography ==
Louis Sendak is a 78-year-old man and a retired superhero. A green door in his house leads to an other-worldly labyrinth to which his father would often go during Louis' childhood to collect strange, alien items. One of these items was the Scarabaeus, which latched on to Louis in 1941 and transformed him, giving him superpowers which he used to become the superhero Scarab.

== Publication history ==
=== Vertigo series ===
The series came about when John Smith asked Stuart Moore for his ideas about a possible reboot of Doctor Fate for DC's Vertigo imprint and giving the imprint its own interpretation of DC's Golden Age history and characters. Smith's proposal was deemed "too extreme" for an established character and was asked to rework the concept into an original creation, which became Scarab. Scarab was subsequently cut down from an ongoing series to a limited series, with pencils by Scot Eaton and inks by Mike Barreiro, which ran for eight issues in 1993 and 1994.

==== Crossover ====
Two Indigo Prime agents, Dazzler and Creed, appeared in Scarab #7 & 8 as a way to end the series due to the problems that Smith had encountered with writing it. Smith explained that "by that time I was probably just so sick of the thing I thought — 'Screw it. I'll rip off my own story' — and stuck in Indigo Prime as a lazy way out'".

=== JSA ===
In JSA Secret Files #1, the book that began the new JSA series in 1999, James Robinson and David S. Goyer referred to Sendak. Wesley Dodds asked the Gray Man to contact the old man for help finding the baby who would become the new Doctor Fate. In issue #1 of JSA, Louis appeared in uniform at the funeral of Wesley Dodds and later told the JSA members some of his history, including that he "dropped out of sight after '44". The character then appeared in JSA #16 and 18, in a storyline written by Goyer and Geoff Johns.
