= Edmund Bagwell =

British comics artist

Edmund Bagwell (1966 – 2017) was a British comics artist. Professionally he was also known as Edmund Perryman, EC Perriman, Edmund Kitsune, Anonyman and Anoniman.

Bagwell was born in Preston, England, and studied art at Leeds Polytechnic. His early career as a comics artist saw him write and draw his own strip, Syd Serene, for Deadline in 1988. He also illustrated Black Axe (1993) for Marvel UK, a Nick Fury strip for Marvel Comics Presents, a Judge Dredd story for 2000 AD, and stories for Crisis and other titles, before moving on to develop concept art and digital design for computer games and film companies. He returned to comics several years later, when he was headhunted to illustrate independent British comic Event Horizon. His work for that comic was noticed by Matt Smith, the editor of 2000 AD, who asked him to work on some one-off stories and then on new series Cradlegrave (2009). Other stories Bagwell illustrated for 2000 AD include Indigo Prime, The Ten-Seconders and Tharg's Future Shocks.

He died on 14 May 2017, due to pancreatic cancer.

== Bibliography ==
- "A Single English Rose" (writer and artist), Blaam! #1 (1988)
- "Doctor Thallus and His Amazing Theories" (writer and artist), Deadline #2 (1988)
- "A Moral Tale" (written by Michael Bonner), Deadline #3 (1988)
- "A Moral Tale: Attack of the Killer Zombie Pensioners from Bradford" (written by Michael Bonner), Deadline #4 (1989)
- Syd Serene (writer and artist), Deadline #5–6 (1988)
- "C-RAP" (written by Peter Hogan), Crisis #41 (1990)
- "The Big Voice" (written by Nick Abadzis), Crisis #63 (1991)
- Contributed to The Comic Relief Comic (1991)
- Judge Dredd: "Joovz N' the Hood" (written by John Wagner), Judge Dredd Mega-Special #2 (1992)
- Motormouth and Killpower #7 (written by Graham Marks), (1992)
- "Mirrors" (written by Terry Kavanagh), 2099 Unlimited #7 (1993)
- Contributed to AIDS Awareness #1 (1993)
- Black Axe #1–7 (written by Simon Jowett) (1993)
- Nick Fury: "Duty and Country" (written by Glenn Greenberg), Marvel Comics Presents #159 (1994)
- Tharg's Future Shocks:
  - "Spaceland" (written by Al Ewing), 2000 AD #1508 (2006)
  - "Natural Order" (written by Arthur Wyatt), 2000 AD #1527 (2007)
  - "Rapture Ready" (written by Arthur Wyatt), 2000 AD #1576 (2008)
- Cradlegrave (written by John Smith), 2000 AD #1633–1644 (2009)
- Tharg's Future Shocks: "Cargo Culture" (written by Arthur Wyatt), 2000 AD #1664 (2009)
- Tharg's Terror Tales: "Pea Patch Podlings" (written by Arthur Wyatt), 2000 AD #1674 (2010)
- Indigo Prime:
  - "Everything and More" (written by John Smith), 2000 AD #1750–1753 (2011)
  - "Anthropocalypse" (written by John Smith), 2000 AD #1756–1763 (2011)
- Judge Dredd: "Day of Chaos: Tea for Two" (written by John Wagner), 2000 AD #1785 (2012)
- Tharg's Terror Tales: "Blackspot" (written by John Smith), 2000 AD #1801 (2012)
- The Ten-Seconders:
  - "Godsend" (episodes 1–8 and 11) (written by Rob Williams), 2000 AD #1839–1849 (2013)
  - "Harris's Quest for the Perfect Xmas Pint" (written by Rob Williams), 2000 AD Prog 2014 (2013)
