= Indigo Prime =

Series of stories written by John Smith

Publication information
- Publisher: Rebellion Developments/2000 AD
- First appearance: "A Change of Scenery" (1986)
- Created by: John Smith

In-story information
- Type of organisation: Continuity watchdog

Indigo Prime is the umbrella name for a series of stories written by John Smith for British comics magazine 2000 AD. It is about an agency existing out of time and whose members are dead that polices the multiverse of parallel realities.

== Plot ==
Indigo Prime is an extra-dimensional agency dedicated to the maintenance and repair of breaks and distortions across the multiverse. However, they're not above making a few 'alterations' for any rich clientele that approach them (although it appears that this is never at the expense of the harmony of the multiverse itself). Their base of operations exists outside the multiverse and time itself in a hypothetical 'nullzone', which every event in time and space throughout the multiverse transects.

All Indigo Prime agents are chosen, upon their death, based on the presence of a certain gene (the "Rembrandt Index") that occurs in one in twelve million people across the multiverse; given a new body, and then trained in a range of abilities to assist them in their job. Each agent also specializes in a role - known job descriptions are: Sceneshifters (who manipulate the physical world), Seamsters (who deal mainly with time) and Imagineers (who can influence minds and dreams).

== Characters ==
- Major E. Kurtz Arcana – Director
- Clive Vista – Director

Current, active agents

- Redman and Dak – Danny Redman is Indigo Prime's newest recruit; a young British soldier resurrected for service when his reality's humankind was wiped out by a global plague of deadly mushroom spores; a plague deliberately engineered by a race of underground-dwelling Neanderthals. Unthur Dak is one of these Neanderthals, an Indigo Prime agent who had spent decades in 'deep cover' and rejoins the agency to act as Danny's handler.
- Winwood and Cord – Respectively, Max and Ishmael. 'Seamsters'.
- Crippen and Kiss – 'Imagineers'. Mariah Kiss is a powerful empath and psychic. Hawley Crippen may be the notorious murderer himself, or an alternate world version.
- William S. Burroughs
- Wenlock and Quilp
- Mickey Challis
- Trixie la Rue
- Doctor Raymond March (Retired)

Presently inactive agents

- Basalt and Foundation – Respectively, Harry and Jerry. 'Sceneshifters.' The first agents readers were introduced to.
- Fervent and Lobe – Freelance 'Psilencers'.
- Almarandra – Fortune teller and Lobe's former girlfriend.
- Fegredo and Brecht – Respectively, Sean and Trevor. 'Sceneshifters'.
- Spacesick Steve – An agent who got lost in the multiverse and in trying to get back to Indigo Prime's hub inadvertently let his specialist hardware fall into the hands of one parallel's inhabitants. Armageddon was averted and Steve rescued, but his body was beyond repair, necessitating his relocation into the body of a newborn baby.

== Publication ==
Initially appearing in the Future Shock "A Change of Scenery" (prog #490) the agency was named Void Indiga but changed after Smith learned of Steve Gerber's graphic novel Void Indigo. Indigo Prime agents then featured in eight illustrated comic stories in 2000 AD, two text only stories, and had cameos in a number of stories about Tyranny Rex, as her stories also occur in the Smithiverse Over twenty years after the last of the original stories was published, Winwood and Cord made a surprise appearance in the last few pages of supposedly unrelated and standalone serial Dead Eyes. This subsequently dovetailed into the first new Indigo Prime stories for two decades.

From episode 3 of "A Dying Art" in 2000 AD #2052, Smith was replaced by Nigel Long, under the pseudonym "Kek-W".

- Tyranny Rex (written by John Smith):
  - Uncollected:
  - "Soft Bodies" (with Will Simpson, in 2000 AD #595-604, 1988)
  - Untitled (with Steve Dillon, in 2000 AD Sci-Fi Special 1988)
- Indigo Prime (written by John Smith):
  - Indigo Prime (2005, DC/Rebellion, ISBN 1-904265-42-1):
    - "Issigri Variations" (with Mike Hadley, in 2000 AD #642-649, 1989)
    - "Holiday on Ice" (with Mike Hadley)
    - "Indigo Prime" (with Chris Weston, in 2000 AD #678, 1989)
    - "Winwood and Cord" (with Chris Weston, in 2000 AD #680-681, 1990)
    - "Fegredo and Brecht" (with Chris Weston, in 2000 AD #682, 1990)
    - "Almaranda: Solstice" (with Mike Hadley, in 2000 AD #720-721, 1991)
    - "Killing Time" (with Chris Weston, in 2000 AD #735-744, 1991)
  - Uncollected:
    - "Requiem" (illustrated, with Chris Weston, in 2000 AD Winter Special 1990)
    - "The Loa in the Machine" (illustrated, with Mick Austin, in 2000 AD Winter Special 1992)
    - "Weird Vibes" (text only, 2000 AD Yearbook 1993)
  - Anthropocalypse (2013, Rebellion, ISBN 978-1-78108-111-2):
    - Dead Eyes: (with Lee Carter, in 2000 AD #1577-1588, 2008)
    - "Everything and More" (with Edmund Bagwell, in 2000 AD #1750-1753, September 2011)
    - "Anthropocalypse" (with Edmund Bagwell, in 2000 AD #1756-1763, October–November 2011)
  - Uncollected:
    - "Perfect Day" (with Lee Carter, in 2000 AD #1880-1887, May 2014)
    - "A Dying Art" (written by Kek-W from episode 3; art by Lee Carter, in 2000 AD #2050-2058, September-November 2017)
    - "Fall of the House of Vista" (written by Kek-W; art by Lee Carter, in 2000 AD #2139-2148, July-September 2019)
