= Firekind =

British comic strip

- Art by Paul Marshall
- Created by: John Smith; Paul Marshall

Publication information
- Publisher: Fleetway
- Schedule: Weekly
- Title(s): 2000 AD #828-840
- Formats: Original material for the series has been published as a strip in the comics anthology(s) 2000 AD.
- Genre: Science fiction
- Publication date: March – June 1993
- Number of issues: 13

Creative team
- Writer(s): John Smith
- Artist(s): Paul Marshall
- Letterer(s): Steve Potter
- Colourist(s): Paul Marshall
- Editor(s): Tharg (Richard Burton); Alan McKenzie; John Tomlinson

Firekind was a comic strip published in the British weekly anthology comic 2000 AD for 13 issues in 1993. It was written by John Smith, with art by Paul Marshall.

== Publication history ==
Firekind came about as part of the "Spring Fever" promotion at 2000 AD after a change in distribution saw a big drop-off in sales. The assistant editor Alan McKenzie had contacted John Smith and suggested he might want to write a story involving dragons to make up for the lack of fantasy in the comic. According to Smith:

when I started to think about it, I realised what a naff proposition the whole thing was. I'd read a few Anne McCaffrey books and she'd pretty much got the whole dragon thing sewn up, so I didn't want to do a rehash of that. I always try to come at things from a different angle, see it from a different perspective, so I though I'd write it as a hard SF story instead.

The story was originally serialised in 2000 AD from issues #828 to #840. Part 7, however, which should have appeared in issue #834, was accidentally omitted. According to John Tomlinson, another assistant editor:

This was born out of the usual tight deadlines we had on 2000 AD and the original art being kept in the same place as already used pages. Somehow one episode got lost in the mix.

Paul Marshall spotted the error but the production staff were running sufficiently far-ahead that they were putting together issue #839 and the missing episode had to be run after the final installment.

The story was entirely reprinted in its proper order in 2000 AD Extreme Edition #8 (2005) and 2000 AD: The Ultimate Collection #82 (2020).

== Plot synopsis ==
The self-contained story concerns a human xeno-botanist named Larsen who travels to the alien jungle planet Gennyo-Leil whose atmosphere is a toxic hallucinogen. Though he initially gains the inhabitants' trust, his mission is compromised by the arrival of a merciless gang of mercenary poacher / torturers. But Gennyo-Leil is not without defences...

James Cameron's film Avatar, released sixteen years later, has a number of similarities with Firekind.

== Sources ==
- Bishop, David Thrill-Power Overload (Rebellion Developments, 260 pages, hardcover, February 2007, ISBN 1-905437-22-6)
