= John Ridgway (comics) =

English comic book artist

- Born: 4 May 1940 (age 86) England
- Area: Artist
- Notable works: Hellblazer

John Ridgway (born 4 May 1940) is an English comic book artist. He is best known as the first artist of the comic book series Hellblazer, featuring John Constantine.

== Career ==
Ridgway began his career initially as a hobby, drawing D.C.Thompson's Commando War Stories alongside professional work as a design engineer. In 1984 Ridgway became a full-time professional, broadening his employment to include 2000 AD, Guttenberghus, Marvel Comics and DC Comics.

Ridgway's full-colour work is immediately distinctive for its unusual realism coupled with a delicate, sketchy pencil line, the two combining to give a slightly old-fashioned look influenced strongly by classic British artist Frank Hampson. This has made him ideal for illustrating strips such as the 1960s set Summer Magic and Enid Blyton's The Famous Five, but it is also a look that lends itself well to large-scale science fiction such as Babylon 5. His portfolio incorporates Doctor Who, Zoids, the Incredible Hulk and My Name is Chaos.

Ridgway has been responsible for creating the look for a number of series, including Hellblazer, Luke Kirby and Junker, a sign of the high regard in which he is held by many editors. He was also the artist chosen to depict Judge Dredd without his helmet - albeit severely disfigured by an acid river - in The Dead Man saga.

He has recently begun experimenting with incorporating computer graphics into his work.

== Bibliography ==
Comics work includes:

- Commando:
  - "Weekend Warriors" (in No. 748, 1973)
  - "Counter Spy" (in No. 864, 1974)
  - "No-Man's Land" (in No. 896, 1974)
  - "Advance!" (in #1490, 1981)
  - "The Line-Shooter" (in #1565, 1981)
  - "Depth-Charges Away!" (in #1654, 1982)
  - "Night of Reckoning" (in #3009, 1996)
  - "Honour!" (in #3362, 2000)
  - "Viking Slave" (in #3471, 2001), continues in;
  - "Free to Fight" (in #3482, 2001)
  - "Mountain Warfare" (in #3530, 2002)
  - "Unexploded Bomb!" (in #3546, 2002)
  - "H-Boat Hunt" (in #3830, 2005)
  - "The Final Flight" (in #3903, 2006)
  - "H-Boat Havoc" (in #3986, 2007)
  - "H-Boat Feud" (in #4035, 2007)
  - "The Axeman" (in #4060, 2007)
  - "H-Boat Hi-Jack" (with Alan Hebden, in #4098, 2008)
  - "The Fighting Fisherman" (with Bill Styles, in #4113, 2008)
  - "Commando versus Kommando" (with Alan Hebden, in #4121, 2008)
  - "The Lost Tanks" (with Alan Hebden, in #4140, 2008)
  - "The Fighting Brothers" (with Mike Knowles, in #4146, 2008)
- The Spiral Path (in Warrior #9–12, 1983)
- Young Marvelman (in Warrior No. 12, 1983)
- The Shroud (in Warrior No. 13, 1983)
- Marvelman Family (in Warrior No. 17, 1984)
- Home is the Sailor (in Warrior No. 17, 1984)
- Shandor Demon Stalker with Steve Moore (in Warrior No. 23)
- Tharg's Future Shocks: "Doing Time" (with Alan Hebden, in 2000 AD No. 377, 1984)
- Doctor Who:
  - First Doctor:
    - "A Religious Experience" (with Tim Quinn, in Yearbook 1994)
  - Fifth Doctor:
    - "Blood Invocation" (with Alan Barnes, in Yearbook 1995)
  - Sixth Doctor:
    - "The Shape-Shifter" (with Steve Parkhouse, in Doctor Who Magazine #88–89, 1984)
    - "Voyager" (with Steve Parkhouse, in Doctor Who Magazine #90–94, 1984)
    - "Polly the Glot" (with Steve Parkhouse, in Doctor Who Magazine #95–97, 1984–1985)
    - "Once Upon a Time-Lord..." (with Steve Parkhouse, in Doctor Who Magazine #98–99, 1985)
    - "War-Game" (with Alan McKenzie, in Doctor Who Magazine #100–101, 1985)
    - "Funhouse" (with Alan McKenzie, in Doctor Who Magazine #102–103, 1985)
    - "Kane's Story" / "Abel's Story" / "The Warrior's Story" / "Frobisher's Story" (with Alan McKenzie, in Doctor Who Magazine #104–107, 1985)
    - "Exodus" / "Revelation!" / "Genesis!" (with Alan McKenzie, in Doctor Who Magazine #108–110, 1986)
    - "Nature of the Beast" (with Simon Furman, in Doctor Who Magazine #111–113, 1986)
    - "Time Bomb" (with Jamie Delano, in Doctor Who Magazine #114–116, 1986)
    - "Salad Daze" (with Simon Furman, in Doctor Who Magazine No. 117, 1986)
    - "Changes" (with Grant Morrison, in Doctor Who Magazine #118–119, 1986)
    - "Profits of Doom!" (with Mike Collins and inks by Tim Perkins in Doctor Who Magazine #120–122, 1987)
    - "The Gift" (with Jamie Delano and inks by Tim Perkins in Doctor Who Magazine #123–126, 1987)
    - "The World Shapers" (with Grant Morrison and inks by Tim Perkins in Doctor Who Magazine #127–129, 1987)
    - "Facades" (with Scott & David Tipton), in Prisoners of Time No. 6, 2013
  - Seventh Doctor:
    - "A Cold Day in Hell" (with Simon Furman in Doctor Who Magazine #130–133, 1987–1988)
    - "Echoes of the Mogor" (with Dan Abnett, in Doctor Who Magazine #143–144, 1988–1989)
    - "Hunger From the Ends of Time" (with Dan Abnett, in The Incredible Hulk Presents #2–3; reprinted in Doctor Who Magazine #157–158, 1990)
    - "Train-Flight" (with Andrew Donkin/Graham S. Brand, in Doctor Who Magazine #159–161, 1990)
    - "Memorial" (with Warwick Gray, in Doctor Who Magazine No. 191, 1992)
    - "Cat Litter" (with Marc Platt, in Doctor Who Magazine No. 192, 1992)
    - "Flashback" (with Warwick Gray, in Winter Special 1992)
    - "Time and Time Again" (with Paul Cornell, in Doctor Who Magazine No. 207, 1993)
    - "Cuckoo" (with Dan Abnett, in Doctor Who Magazine #208–210, 1993)
    - "Uninvited Guest" (with Warwick Gray, in Doctor Who Magazine No. 211, 1993)
- Torchwood
  - "Overture: A Captain Jack Adventure" (with Gary Russell), in Torchwood Magazine No. 25, 2010
- The Liberators (with Grant Morrison, in Warrior No. 26 & the Warrior/Comics International flipbook, 1985 & 1996)
- Transformers: "Man of Iron" pt 1–2 (in Transformers #9–10, 1985, No. 33 [US] 1987)
- Spider-Man and the Zoids #36–37: "Bits and Pieces" (with Grant Morrison, 1986)
- Solomon Kane #6 (with Ralph Macchio, Marvel Comics, 1986)
- Bozz Chronicles #4 (with David Michelinie, Epic Comics, 1986)
- Amazing High Adventure #5 (with Mike Baron, Marvel Comics, 1986)
- Miracleman #10 (inks over Rick Veitch, Eclipse Comics, 1986)
- Spider-Man and the Zoids #51: "Getting Even" (with Richard Alan, 1987)
- One-Off: "Candy and the Catchman" (with Grant Morrison, in 2000 AD No. 491, 1986)
- The Incredible Hulk #335 (with Peter David, Marvel Comics, 1987)
- Alien Encounters #14 (with Jack Butterworth, Eclipse Comics, 1987)
- Hellblazer #1–9 (with Jamie Delano, DC Comics, 1987–1988)
- Solo Avengers #5 (with Dennis Mallonee, Marvel Comics, 1988)
- Amazing Adventure #1 (with J.M DeMatteis, Marvel Comics, 1988)
- Rick Mason, The Agent (with James D. Hudnall, Marvel Comics, 1989)
- Critical Mass #3, 5–6 (with D. G. Chichester and Margaret Clark, Epic Comics, 1990)
- Open Space #2 (with F. Paul Wilson, Marvel Comics, 1990)
- Clive Barker's Hellraiser #3 (with Randy Lofficier and Jean-Marc Lofficier, Epic Comics, 1990)
- Hook Magazine (with Charles Vess, Marvel Comics, 1992)
- My Name is Chaos #1–4 (with Tom Veitch, DC Comics, 1992)
- The Punisher Back to School Special #1 (with Barry Dutter, Marvel Comics, 1992)
- Chiller #1–2 (with James D. Hudnall, Epic Comics, 1993)
- The Punisher Holiday Special #2 (with Dan Abnett and Andy Lanning, Marvel Comics, 1994)
- Harsh Realm #1–6 (inks over Andrew Paquette, Harris Comics, 1994)
- The Spectre #20, 26, 34, 45 (with John Ostrander, DC Comics, 1994–1996)
- Lobo Annual #2 (with Alan Grant, DC Comics, 1994)
- Dark Dominion #10 (with Janet Jackson and Len Wein, Defiant Comics, 1994)
- Prince Valiant #1–4 (with Charles Vess, Marvel Comics, 1994–1995)
- Judge Dredd:
  - "The Raggedy Man" (with John Wagner and Alan Grant, in 2000 AD #525-26, 1987)
  - "Twister" (with John Wagner, in 2000 AD #588–591, 1988)
  - "A Night at the Opera" (with John Wagner, in 2000 AD No. 597, 1988)
  - "Alzhiemer's Block" (with John Wagner, in 2000 AD #605–606, 1988)
  - "Radlander" (with John Wagner, in Judge Dredd Megazine #4.16–4.18, 2002)
  - "Damned Ranger" (with John Wagner, in Judge Dredd Megazine #218–220, 2004)
  - "Cursed Earth Rules" (with Simon Spurrier, in Judge Dredd Megazine No. 236, 2005)
- The Journal of Luke Kirby (with Alan McKenzie):
  - "Summer Magic" (in 2000 AD #571–577, 1988)
  - "The Dark Path" (in 2000 AD Sci-Fi Special 1990)
  - "The Night Walker" (in 2000 AD #800–812, 1992)
  - "Sympathy for the Devil Prologue" (in 2000 AD #850–851, 1993)
  - "Trick or Treat" (in 2000 AD 1994 Yearbook, 1993)
  - "The Price" (in 2000 AD No. 972, 1995)
- The Dead Man (with John Wagner, in 2000 AD #650–662, 1989–1990)
- Junker (with Michael Fleisher)
  - "Junker Part 1" (in 2000 AD #708–716, 1990–1991)
  - "Junker Part 2" (in 2000 AD #724–730, 1991)
- Strontium Dog: "The Walking Lady (An Untold Tale of Johnny Alpha)" (with Peter Hogan, in 2000 AD Sci-Fi Special 1992)
- Calhab Justice (with Jim Alexander):
  - "Calhab Justice" (in Judge Dredd Megazine #2.10–2.13, 1992)
  - "Hogmanay" (in Judge Dredd Megazine #2.18, 1992)
  - "Family Snapshot" (in Judge Dredd Megazine #2.64–2.66, 1994)
- Vector 13:
  - "Case One: Who Was the Mothman?" (with Shaky Kane, in 2000 AD No. 951, 1995)
  - "Case Seven: Are They Cats?" (with Peter Hogan, in 2000 AD No. 957, 1995)
  - "Case One: Berserkers" (with Brian Williamson, in 2000 AD #965, 1995)
  - "Case Six: A Salver in the Heavens" (with Dan Abnett, in 2000 AD No. 970, 1995)
  - "Case Eight: Worlds at War" (with Dan Abnett, in 2000 AD No. 995, 1996)
  - "Case Ten: Video Nasty" (with Pat Mills, in 2000 AD No. 997, 1996)
- Babylon 5 (written by Timothy DeHaas, based on storyline by J. Michael Straczynski, DC Comics)
  - "With Friends Like These..." (in Babylon 5 No. 5, 1995)
  - "Against the Odds" (in Babylon 5 No. 6, 1995)
  - "Survival the Hard Way" (in Babylon 5 No. 7, 1995)
  - "Silent Enemies" (in Babylon 5 No. 8, 1995)
  - "The Psi Corps and You!" (in Babylon 5 No. 11, 1995)
- The Invisibles #11 (with Grant Morrison, Vertigo Comics, 1995)
- Books of Magic #20, 72 (with John Ney Rieber and Peter Gross, Vertigo Comics, 1996–2000)
- Darkness Visible (with Nick Abadzis, in 2000 AD #975–979, 1996)
- The Age of Heroes #1–5, Special #1–2 (with James D. Hudnall, Image Comics, 1997–1999)
- Michael Moorcock's Multiverse #1–12 (with Michael Moorcock, DC Comics, 1997–1998)
- Trenchcoat Brigade #1–4 (with John Ney Rieber, Vertigo Comics, 1999)
- The Invisibles vol. 2 #4–2 (with Grant Morrison, Vertigo Comics, 2000)
- Missionary Man: "Place of the Dead" (with Gordon Rennie, in Judge Dredd Megazine #4.9–4.13, 2002)
- Armitage: "Apostasy in the UK" (with Dave Stone, in Judge Dredd Megazine #212–213, 2003)
- Middenface McNulty (with Alan Grant):
  - "Mutopia" (in Judge Dredd Megazine #205–207, 2003)
  - "Killoden" (in Judge Dredd Megazine #224–229, 2004–2005)
