= Lee Carter (comics) =

British fantasy artist

- Areas: Penciller, Inker, Colorist
- Notable works: Necrophim

Lee Carter is a British fantasy artist whose work has appeared in 2000 AD.

== Work ==
Carter's "day job" is as a concept artist for computer games company Bizarre Creations.

His published comics work includes the Dead Eyes and Necrophim series for 2000 AD. He has also worked freelance for various fantasy gaming and roleplay publishers, such as Wizards of the Coast, Games Workshop, Fantasy Flight Games and Green Ronin.

== Bibliography ==
Comics work includes:

- "Necromachia" (with writer Liam Sharp, Event Horizon #1 and 2, Mam Tor Publishing, May, November 2005)
- Fear the Dead: A Zombie Survivor's Journal (with writer Michael Alan Nelson, hardcover one-shot, Boom! Studios, April 2006)
- "Witch Hunter" (with Andrew Cosby, in Cthulhu Tales #1, Boom! Studios, May 2006)
- "Namesake" (with John Rogers, in Pirate Tales #1, Boom! Studios, October 2006)
- Tharg's Terror Tales: "Bad Blood" (with Arthur Wyatt, in 2000 AD #1539, May 2007)
- Dead Eyes: (with writers John Smith, in 2000 AD #1577-1588, March–May 2008)
- The Darkness #75 (with Phil Hester, Top Cow, February 2009)
- Necrophim (with Tony Lee):
  - "Prologue" (in 2000 AD #1628-1623, March–April 2009)
  - "Hell's Prodigal" (in 2000 AD #1655-1665, September–December 2009)
- Mr Stuffins #1 (with writers Andrew Cosby/Johanna Stokes, Boom! Studios, April 2009)
- "Militär and Klaus" (with Andi Ewington and 44 other artists, in Forty-Five, anthology graphic novel, Com.x, February 2010, ISBN 1-61584-713-8)
- Indigo Prime: "Perfect Day" (in 2000 AD #1880-1887, May 2014)
- Durham Red: "Born Bad" (episodes 5–8, in 2000 AD #2086–2089, 2018)
