= Simon Jowett =

British author and scriptwriter

- Website: www.simonjowett.com

Simon Jowett is a British author and scriptwriter.

== Biography ==
His early work was in comics, as the writer of the James Bond stories Silent Armageddon (1993, drawn by John M. Burns) and Shattered Helix (1994, drawn by David Jackson, over layouts and with colouring by David Lloyd) and as a contributor to 2000AD. He left comics largely behind in the mid-1990s, when he moved into script-writing for other media. He has worked on feature-length adaptations of children's fiction and has written scripts for a number of computer games, including the best-selling Fire Warrior, the landmark game/internet serial Halcyon Sun (with Jonathan Clements) and 007: First Light.

Jowett's broadcast television work includes Shane the Chef, which he co-created, A.T.O.M. (Jetix/Toon Disney), Chop Socky Chooks (Aardman Animations), Zula Patrol (Zeeter Productions), Pitt & Kantrop (Millimages), The Way Things Work (Millimages) and episodes of Bob the Builder (HIT Entertainment).

He is also the author of two novels and several children's books, including movie tie-ins to Finding Nemo and Wallace and Gromit. He has also contributed short stories and novellas set in the Warhammer 40K game universe to various anthologies published by the Black Library imprint of BL Publishing, a subsidiary of Games Workshop.

== Television ==
- Shane the Chef (2018) - Co-creator/Head Writer
  - Missing Mum
  - Shane's World Record
  - All at Sea
  - Dancing Under the Stars
  - Drone Zone
  - Run For It
  - Nature Trail Trouble
  - Who's Cooking?
  - Mama's Bad Hair Day
  - Where's Eddy?
  - Dr Izzy
  - Honey Honey
  - Snow Wonder
  - Snow Food
- Tilly and Friends (2012)
  - Pru's Parade
  - Hector's Pet
- Mouk (2011)
  - The Best Dressed Elephant
- Pet Squad - (2011)
  - It Came from Down Under
  - The New Kid
- Rastamouse - (2011)
  - Da Rare Groove
- Gigglebiz - (2009-2011)
- Dennis & Gnasher - (2009-2010)
  - Dig This
  - Game On
  - The Great Outdoors
- Bear Behaving Badly (2009)
  - Crazy Keith: Extreme Koala
- Timmy Time (2009)
  - Go Kart Timmy
  - Timmy Needs a Bath
- Chuggington (2008)
  - Wilson and the Wild Wind
  - Brewster Goes Bananas
  - Old Puffer Pete's Tour
- Pinky and Perky Show (2008)
  - Pretty in Pork
  - You'll Believe a Pig Can Fly
  - Where Is Everybody?
- Famous 5: On the Case (2008)
  - The Case of the Defective Detective
  - The Case of the Fudgie Fry Pirates
  - The Case of the Bogus Banknotes
- The Zula Patrol (2006-2008)
  - The Lizard Who Came to Dinner
  - Island of the Endotherms
  - The Sound of Multo
  - Eyes in the Skies
  - Rock and Patrol
  - Support Your Neighborhood Volcano (2006)
- Chop Socky Chooks (2008)
  - His Master's Choice
  - Enter the Chickens (story editor)
- Combo Ninos (2006-2007)
  - DivinoDoro
  - Kissy Kissy Love Love
  - Los Rivlos
- A.T.O.M. - Alpha Teens on Machines (2005-2007)
  - Serving Two Masters
  - Secret Admirer
  - Zoo Story
  - High Frontier
  - Resurrection
  - Fathers and Daughters
  - Daddy's Little Girl
  - The Experiment
- Pitt and Kantrop (2005)
  - Ride 'Em, Pitt
  - Vacation Creation
  - Table for 15
- Planet Cook (2004)
  - Monsters of the Deep
  - Inuits [sic]
  - Electric Animals
  - Thunder and Lightning
  - Rainforests
- The Way Things Work (2004)
  - The Sound of Mammoths/La Melodie des Mammouths
  - The Far Side
  - Shocking!
  - 'Displace' Ain't Big Enough For The Both Of Us
  - Images
  - Take It To The Bridge
  - Under Pressure
  - On Squeezing Mammoths
  - That Sinking Feeling
- Wilf The Witch's Dog (2002)
  - Card Tricks
  - The Little Fib
  - The Opposite Spell
  - Mad Gadgets
  - Wide Awake Wilf
- Bob the Builder (1999 - 2002)
  - Ballroom Bob
  - Hamish's New Home
  - Spud the Pilot
  - Wendy's Removal Service
  - Bob and the Big Freeze
  - Inspector Spud
  - One Shot Wendy
  - Roley and the Rock Star
  - Special Delivery Spud
  - Roley's Tortoise
  - Dizzy's Birdwatch
  - Wendy's Big Match
- Upstairs Downstairs Bears (2000)
  - A Winter's Day
  - Art Attack
  - Cleaning Day
  - Mrs B's Birthday
  - The Last Card
  - Wash Day

== Videogames ==
- 007 First Light (2026) (IO Interactive)
- Run (2005) (BBC Interactive/Monterosa)
- Halcyon Sun (2002) (Kuju Entertainment)
- Sky Storm (2002) (unpublished) (Kuju Entertainment)
- Thunderbirds (2002) (unpublished) (Kuju Entertainment)
- Warhammer 40,000: Fire Warrior (1999) (writer/script editor) (Kuju Entertainment)

== Fiction ==
=== Original Children's Fiction ===
- One of Our Demons is Missing
- A Visit From Beyond

=== Novellas/Short fiction ===
- Warhammer 40,000
  - Xenocide
  - Descent
  - Apothecary's Honour
  - Hell in a Bottle
  - Loyalty's Reward
- Warhammer Fantasy
  - A Good Thief
- 2000AD
  - Judge Dredd: Black Atlantic (with Peter J. Evans)

== Comics ==
- The Enlghtement of Ly-Chee The Wise a 5-page comic strip in The Incredible Hulk Presents #10 (with Andrew Wildman, Marvel UK, 1989)
- James Bond:
  - A Silent Armageddon #1-2 (with John Burns, proposed 4-issue mini-series, Dark Horse Comics, 1993)
  - Shattered Helix (with David Jackson, David Lloyd, 2-issue mini-series, 1994)
- Black Axe (with pencils by Edmund Perryman and inks by Rodney Ramos, 7-issue mini-series, Marvel UK, 1993)
- Wild Things #1-7 (with Duke Mighten, Marvel UK, 1993))
- Dances With Demons (with pencils by Charlie Adlard and inks by Rodney Ramos, 4-issue mini-series, Marvel UK, 1993)
- Marvel Comics Presents #164-167 ("Behold the Man-Thing") (Marvel Comics, 1994)
- Vector 13: "Case One: Extraction Point" (in 2000 AD #988, 1996)

Preceded by Steve Gerber	Man-Thing writer 1994	Succeeded by J. M. DeMatteis
