= Graham Higgins =

- Born: 1953 (age 72–73)
- Area: Artist

Graham Higgins (born 1953) is a British writer and artist, designer and lecturer.

== Biography ==
Higgins' association with comics began with independent publishers Birmingham's Ar-Zak Press and Knockabout Comics. He has drawn cartoons and covers for Punch including the Chandleresque comic-strip "Luke Carew, Lone Wolf Detective - The Hogfather", Radio Times, Q magazine and others, and has also drawn for DC Comics, Marvel Comics and 2000 AD He is an associate artist with Comic Company, illustrating educational publications featuring health and social advice for children and young people.

Higgins is also associated with the UK fantasy fiction scene, as an occasional member of the Midnight Rose Collective and artist on the graphic novel adaptations of two Discworld novels, Mort and Guards! Guards!'.

== Bibliography ==
- The Journal of Luke Kirby: "A Winter's Tale" (with Alan McKenzie, in 2000 AD Winter Special 1, 1988)
