= Vector 13 =

Vector 13 is a comic strip published in the British magazine 2000 AD. It featured the eponymous agency set up to investigate anomalous phenomena and conspiracy theories. It was influenced by American TV drama The X-Files (which was at the height of its popularity at the time) and other events such as the 1995 release of the alien autopsy film; as general interest in the paranormal and parapolitics waned, the series was wound up and replaced by Pulp Sci-Fi and the return of Tharg's Future Shocks as a venue for single issue self-contained stories. In turn it foreshadowed other comics series dedicated to similar agencies, such as Caballistics, Inc.

The format was created by former 2000 AD editor and long-time contributor Alan McKenzie.

== Synopsis ==
Each story was presented by the Men in Black, as being a true file from their cases touching on a whole range of Forteana from Mothman to the Chupacabras and broader conspiracy theories such as those surrounding Project MKULTRA.

In the middle of the series run (and as the interest in such subjects peaked) the MiB broke out of their own strip and took over the running of the magazine from #1014 (appearing as part of the logo from #1015), as editor Tharg was allegedly away dealing with a crisis. This first issue coinciding with a promotion of the X-Files series 2 trading cards.

=== Continuity ===
Cases were not always consistent:

- Series 1 "Case Nine: Spear of Destiny", series 3, "Case Three: The Dream Factory" and "Divine Fury".
  - Case Nine revealed that the Spear Of Destiny was used as the flagpole in the 1969 Moon landing, whereas Case Three stated that the Moon landing had been faked in order to cover up a much more advanced space programme prevalent throughout the Solar System. Divine Fury intimated that the space programme was accurate, but had been based on alien technology first discovered and reverse-engineered by the Nazis in the latter stages of World War II.
- Series 2 "Case Four: Operation Mordred", "Case Seven: Psi-Wars", series 3 "Case Zero: Oath of Office" and series 5 "Case Nine: JFKed!"
  - Case Four stated that John F. Kennedy was killed by a time-traveller to avert a dystopian future where Kennedy had instigated a nuclear holocaust after the American defeat in Vietnam. Case Seven showed that he was assassinated by a Soviet agent assisted by psychic operatives, and Case Zero showed Kennedy as being assassinated by the Illuminati for not following their leadership. Finally, Case Nine had Kennedy assassinated by time travelling hitmen hired by a future-cabal from "a post-nuclear shambles" where Kennedy's death was deemed more profound than his life. In the last panel the hitmen were revealed to be Sinister and Dexter.

== Bibliography ==
All cases were single episode stories with the exception of the "Black Light" crossovers which occasionally featured the MiB.

- Series 1:
  - "Case One: Who Was the Mothman?" (by Shaky Kane and John Ridgway, in 2000 AD #951, 1995)
  - "Case Two: In Hollow Lands" (by Kek-W and Paul Marshall, in 2000 AD #952, 1995)
  - "Case Three: Circle of Evil" (by Nick Abadzis and Kevin Cullen, in 2000 AD #953, 1995)
  - "Case Four: Parallel Lines" (by John Tomlinson and Lee Sullivan, in 2000 AD #954, 1995)
  - "Case Five: The Henderson Event" (by Alan McKenzie and Dave D'Antiquis, in 2000 AD #955, 1995)
  - "Case Six: Marion" (by Dan Abnett and Sean Phillips, in 2000 AD #956, 1995)
  - "Case Seven: Are They Cats?" (by Peter Hogan and John Ridgway, in 2000 AD #957, 1995)
  - "Case Eight: Echo Location" (by Dan Abnett and Nigel Dobbyn, in 2000 AD #958, 1995)
  - "Case Nine: Spear of Destiny" (by Peter Hogan and David Hine, in 2000 AD #959, 1995)
- Series 2:
  - "Case One: Berserkers" (by Brian Williamson and John Ridgway, in 2000 AD #965, 1995)
  - "Case Two: Danse Macabre" (with Dan Abnett and Kevin Cullen, in 2000 AD #966, 1995)
  - "Case Three: Heatwave" (by Kevin Gill and Dave D'Antiquis, in 2000 AD #967, 1995)
  - "Case Four: Operation Mordred" (by Peter Hogan and Lee Sullivan, in 2000 AD #968, 1995)
  - "Case Five: Shadrach" (by Dan Abnett and Nick Percival, in 2000 AD #969, 1995)
  - "Case Six: A Salver in the Heavens" (by Dan Abnett and John Ridgway, in 2000 AD #970, 1995)
  - "Case Seven: Psi-Wars" (by Kek-W and Kevin Cullen, in 2000 AD #971, 1995)
  - "Case Eight: Red in Tooth and Claus" (by John Tomlinson and Lee Sullivan, in 2000 AD #972, 1995)
  - "Case Nine: Blackout" (by Dan Abnett and Mike Perkins, in 2000 AD #973, 1996)
  - "Case Ten: Thrillkill" (by Brian Williamson and John Burns, in 2000 AD #974, 1995)
  - "Case Eleven: K2" (with Kevin Gill and Mike Hadley, in 2000 AD #975, 1995)
- Series 3:
  - "Case Zero: Oath of Office" (by Gordon Rennie and Garry Marshall, in 2000 AD #987, 1996)
  - "Case One: Extraction Point" (by Simon Jowett and Paul Johnson, in 2000 AD #988, 1996)
  - "Case Two: Trinity" (by Simon Furman and John Higgins, in 2000 AD #989, 1996)
  - "Case Three: The Dream Factory" (by Kek-W and Steve Yeowell, in 2000 AD #990, 1996)
  - "Case Four: Parts and Labour" (by Dan Abnett and Mick Austin, in 2000 AD #991, 1996)
  - "Case Five: Assassin" (by Alan McKenzie and Dave D'Antiquis, in 2000 AD #992, 1996)
  - "Case Six: Screaming Friar" (by Brian Williamson and John Burns, in 2000 AD #993, 1996)
  - "Case Seven: Buzz-Saw" (by Kevin Gill and Kevin Cullen, in 2000 AD #994, 1996)
  - "Case Eight: Worlds at War" (by Dan Abnett and John Ridgway, in 2000 AD #995, 1996)
  - "Case Nine: Down to the Woods" (by Brian Williamson and Kevin Cullen, in 2000 AD #996, 1996)
  - "Case Ten: Video Nasty" (by Pat Mills and John Ridgway, in 2000 AD #997, 1996)
  - "Case Eleven: Imaginary Friend" (by Nick Abadzis and Paul Johnson, in 2000 AD #998-999, 1996)
- Series 4:
  - "Case One: Devil in the Deep Blue Sea" (by Steve White and Henry Flint, in 2000 AD #1024, 1997)
  - "Case Two: It's Good to Talk" (by Nick Abadzis and Sean Phillips, in 2000 AD #1025, 1997)
  - "Case Three: The Blackwater Incident" (by Shaky Kane and David Bircham, in 2000 AD #1026, 1997)
  - "Case Four: Bad Moon Rising" (by Steve White and Amanda Fletcher, in 2000 AD #1027, 1997)
  - "Case Five: Patent Pending" (by Gordon Rennie and Mike Perkins, in 2000 AD #1028, 1997)
  - "Case Six: Bodysnatchers" (by Gordon Rennie and Alex Ronald, in 2000 AD #1029, 1997)
  - "Case Seven: The Immortality Question" (with Paul Neal and Cyril Julien, in 2000 AD #1030, 1997)
  - "Case Eight: Unhallowed Ground" (by Gordon Rennie and Allan Bednar as "Neal Brand", in 2000 AD #1031, 1997)
  - "Case Nine: The Sad Child" (by Dan Abnett and Paul Marshall, in 2000 AD #1032, 1997)
  - "Case Ten: Case Closed?" (by David Bishop and Simon Davis, in 2000 AD #1032, 1997)
- Series 5:
  - "Case Zero: Shadows and Light" (by Gordon Rennie and Dylan Teague, in 2000 AD #1060, 1997)
  - "Case One: Side Step" (by Dan Abnett and Chris Weston, in 2000 AD # 1062, 1997)
  - "Case Two: Cryptogram" (by Dan Abnett and Alex Ronald, in 2000 AD #1063, 1997)
  - "Case Three: Graven Images" (by John Smith and Cliff Robinson, in 2000 AD #1064, 1997)
  - "Case Four: HALO" (by Chris Standley and Robert McCallum, in 2000 AD # 1065 (1997))
  - "Case Six: MK-Ultra" (by Gordon Rennie and Alex Ronald, in 2000 AD #1067, 1997)
  - "Case Seven: Night of the Jaguar" (by Steve White and Marc Wigmore, in 2000 AD #1068, 1997)
  - "Case Eight: Midnight Rambler" (by Gordon Rennie and Paul Johnson, in 2000 AD #1069, 1997)
  - "Case Nine: JFKed" (by Dan Abnett and Allan Bednar as "Neal Brand", in 2000 AD #1070, 1997)
  - "Case Ten: Angels" (by Robbie Morrison and Lee Sullivan, in 2000 AD #1071, 1997)
  - "Case Eleven: Search & Rescue" (by Gordon Rennie and Cliff Robinson, in 2000 AD #1072, 1997)
  - "Case Twelve: Deep Freeze" (by Kek-W and Paul Marshall, in 2000 AD #1073, 1997)
  - "Case Thirteen: Sands of Death" (by Robbie Morrison and Alex Ronald, in 2000 AD #1074, 1997)
  - "Case Fourteen: Chupacabras" (by Chris Standley and Allan Bednar as "Neal Brand", in 2000 AD #1075, 1997)
  - "Case Fifteen: Time's Arrow" (by Gordon Rennie and Patrick Woodrow, in 2000 AD #1076, 1998)
- Series 6:
  - "Case One: Houdini" (by Dan Abnett and Robert McCallum, in 2000 AD #1078, 1998)
  - "Case Two: Chill Out" (by D. McDonagh and Charles Gillespie, in 2000 AD #1079, 1998)
  - "Case Three: Shades of Grey" (by Dan Abnett and Robert McCallum, in 2000 AD #1080, 1998)
  - "Case Four: Einstein's Monsters" (by Gordon Rennie and Cyril Julien, in 2000 AD #1081, 1998)
  - "Case Five: Seal of Solomon" (by Gordon Rennie and Alex Ronald, in 2000 AD #1082, 1998)
  - "Case Six: Godhead Revisited" (by Dan Abnett and Allan Bednar, in 2000 AD #1083, 1998)
- A stand-alone episode:
  - "Divine Fury" (with Lee Marks and Cliff Robinson, in 2000 AD #1117, 1998)
- Specials:
  - "Case 459: Sheep's Clothing" (by Dan Abnett and Lee Sullivan, in 2000 AD Winter Special 1995)
  - "Case 667: Suburban Hell" (by Igor Goldkind, Dix and Nick Abadzis, in 2000 AD Sci-Fi Special 1996)
- Crossover:
  - The Vector 13 Men in Black appeared on several occasions in Black Light, usually as plot devices to offer hints or explanations as to Black Light's activities - particularly in the "Pandora's Box" storyline.

== See also ==
- Bureau 13
- Bureau for Paranormal Research and Defense
