= New Statesmen =

British comic book story

- The cover of New Statesmen #1, dated April 1991 featuring (clockwise from front) Cleve, Meridian, Vegas, Burgess, and Dalton; art by Sean Phillips.
- Publisher: Fleetway Publications
- Publication date: 17 September 1988 – 30 September 1989
- Title(s): Crisis #1-14; 17 September 1988 to 18 March 1989; Crisis #28; 30 September 1989
- Main character(s): Burgess; Cleve; Dalton; Meridian; Vegas

Creative team
- Writer: John Smith
- Artist(s): Jim Baikie (#1-4, #9-12 and #28); Sean Phillips (#5-6 and #13-14); Duncan Fegredo (#7-8)
- Letterer: Annie Parkhouse
- Editor: Steve MacManus
- The Complete New Statesmen: ISBN 9781853862175

"New Statesmen" is a British revisionist superhero comic story. It was originally published in the adult-orientated anthology comic Crisis between 17 September 1988 to 18 March 1989, with a brief return on 30 September 1989. Written by John Smith and initially with art from Jim Baikie, the story took place in America, 2047 and revolved around the Optimen, a group of genetically engineered superheroes assigned to each U.S. state - one of whom is running for President.

== Creation ==
Charged by Fleetway Publications managing director John Sanders with coming up with a comics anthology for older readers which could be repackaged for sale in the booming American comics market, Steve MacManus decided on a fortnightly with two 14-page stories, the equivalent of a single monthly American title. Sanders requested superheroes be involved; while MacManus had little experience with the genre, Grant Morrison's "Zenith" in 2000 AD had convinced him that it could be done well by British writers. MacManus conceived the plot idea of a future America where each state had its own superhero - along with Britain, which had been incorporated as the 51st state. Wanting to use the new anthology to find new British talent, MacManus turned to the 22-year old John Smith to write it, whose work on Starblazer and 2000 AD had drawn good critical notices, with Jim Baikie - another 2000 AD alumni - as artist. Part of the attraction was the increased creator rights offered by Fleetway after MacManus heavily reworked the company's contracts. While the story was aimed at similar dark territory as Alan Moore's Watchmen, MacManus had not read the latter at the time.

Smith added an element of realism to MacManus' sketch, coming up with the concept of the superhumans having 'soft' and 'hard' genetic talents. He would later describe the storyline as "deliberately convoluted" and noted that films were more of an influence on the story than literature, crediting Don't Look Now, Blood Simple and 12 Angry Men as particular inspirations. MacManus had originally envisioned the title as a flipbook called 50/50, with a cover either side and each half of the contents designed by a different graphic artist. Steve Cook was assigned to design the "New Statesmen" half, but the format was overridden by management. The comic was retitled Crisis, and Cook's design work was relegated entirely to the interior.

== Publishing history ==
"New Statesmen" appeared as planned in the launch issue of Crisis (cover-dated 17 September 1988). The strain of providing 7 pages a week - which, unlike American contemporaries, British artists pencilled, inked and (in the case of Crisis) coloured - soon proved a strain; Baikie rested after the first four chapters, with first Duncan Fegredo and then Sean Phillips taking over. Baikie returned for Crisis #9-12, before Phillips again drew #13-14. Smith felt his writing improved dramatically when, several chapters in, he actually got to meet Baikie in person and they began developing the story together.

However, after a respectable start sales for the title tailed off alarmingly; MacManus found himself defending the comic against Sanders' replacement after Fleetway were drastically downsized under the ownership of Robert Maxwell. While the editor was able to save the title, audience research revealed considerable problems with the format; just two stories (the other being Pat Mills' "Third World War") left little choice for readers, and both effectively being complex, serialised graphic novels made Crisis intimidating to new or lapsed readers. As such the first 'book' of "New Statesmen" ended in Crisis #14 (dated 18 March 1989), being replaced by "Sticky Fingers" and Garth Ennis' "Troubled Souls".

Hazy mentions were made of a second arc - the material in Crisis #7-8 was meant to function as a preview of further developments - and a new episode appeared in Crisis #28 (dated 30 September 1989), even making a rare cover appearance. However, the editorial made clear this was a one-off return, being an extra episode commissioned for the American market; after a lack of interest from American publishers, Fleetway had set up Fleetway Quality with Dez Skinn's Quality Communications to repackage the material themselves. "New Statesmen" was compiled as a five-part prestige-format limited series, with the new strip as a prologue - speculated to be an attempt to counter some of the criticism of the story's labyrinthine plot. Featuring new covers by Phillips, the series was released in America in 1989 but failed to find particular commercial or critical success. Fleetway Quality also issued collected edition The Complete New Statesmen in November 1990.

After the cancellation of Crisis in 1991 and the collapse of Maxwell's empire after his death, the elements of the comic and stories that Fleetway owned passed to Egmont Publishing. In 2016 they were sold on to Rebellion Developments, who began reprinting strips from various titles. The first reprinted from Crisis was "Third World War", beginning in 2020. At the time, Treasury of British Comics editor Oliver Pickles noted that while he was a fan of "New Statesmen" and would liked to have seen a new edition printed, the large number of copies of the 1990 edition available cheaply second-hand online made it unlikely.

== Plot summary ==
Bankrolled by funds diverted from Ronald Reagan's Star Wars programme in 1984, scientists Alan Lambert and Dr. Kathleen Shaw set up the Hephaestus Program in 1988. The pair solved the genetic code of mankind in two years, unveiling the first genetically-engineered Optiman prototype in 1990 and in August 1992, the first batch of three enhanced Optimen was completed. The first five batches featured enhanced 'hard' talents based around physical strength and endurance but research led to a breakthrough in psi-talent in 2011 and production switched to Optimen with 'soft' talents based around mental powers, triggering a boom in biotechnology. In 2010, America pulled out of NATO, with England following the year later (despite opposition from the English Liberation Army) and eventually being accepted as the 51st state, while the EEC allies with the USSR after the 2014 Lutsk summit.

Ongoing terrorist actions saw the Optimen sent into combat shortly afterwards; while officially the Statesmen were anti-terror troops they also carry out numerous other destabilising missions for the American government. While initially the genetic superhumans are treated with suspicion, careful spin and branding from the Federal Defence Council (FDC) saw them acclaimed as celebrities and heroes, especially after intervention in South Africa. However, the actions of one group - the Halcyon Squad, made up of Burgess, Cleve, Dalton, Meridian and Vegas - become increasingly difficult to control, especially after a bloody action (known as Tariq Alley) against the ELA on the border of Wales leaves hundreds of innocent bystanders dead.

The Halcyons return from exile in Puerto Rico to New York in 2048 to secretly to attend a reunion, and find another Statesman - Phoenix - is preparing a Presidential campaign at the head of a zealous religious party called the League of Light, arguing for a return to traditional American values. However, the group's return is exposed when an unsuccessful assassination attempt is made on Dalton (a closeted homosexual, despite his relationship with Meridian), who triggers a blackout of half the city in response after killing the gunman and scores of others, causing further unrest. The Halcyons find themselves at the centre of a media circus, and come under heavy criticism from Phoenix and the League of Light, who are gaining in popularity. Part of the FDC's reason for bringing the charismatic team back is to counter Phoenix, whose bid for office is backed by a huge business empire, built around his church and including control of numerous violent fundamentalist gangs.

Their investigation into the assassination attempt and the League of Light is coordinated by old FDC handler Irwin Freyer. To her annoyance, psychic Meridian is paired up with the seedy bruiser Vegas while Dalton is paired with the English Burgess, with Cleve overseeing the operation. Meridian and Vegas follow the trail from the assassin to a priest called de Palma, who has been letting one of the League's gangs operate and deal drugs in his area with impunity on the orders of 'The Admiral'; Vegas wipes out the gang and crushes the priest's head. The conspiracy leads them to drug-running computer magnate George Cattrill, but leaks in the government tip off Phoenix - who is using his healing powers to gain control over numerous influential figures Phoenix wipes out weak links and weathers his links to Cattrill, and his popularity actually increases. Meridian meanwhile is getting increasingly troubling visions of 'Burning Men'.

The Statesmen reunion continues and parades through America, with the Halcyons included on government orders; when not actively in front of the public the superhumans turn to drink and gossip, though Burgess comes increasingly distressed about his role in the Tariq Alley massacre. Fights break out and a journalist visiting the Statesmen is accidentally killed, while Meridian receives a vision saying Cleve will die - but is devastated when she finds Dalton in bed with Burgess.

Riots begin to break out between mobs supporting and opposing the League of Light, while Californian Senator Bob McKitrick - an ally of Phoenix - is shot at a rally. Meanwhile, the Halcyons discover the military have covered up a massacre when a Tamarisk convoy stumbled across a secret installation. The purportedly-amoral San Francisco is struck by multiple terrorist incidents linked to the League of Light. Phoenix is targeted for death by California's Statesman Burbank but kills his would-be assassin easily, and begins making his way to San Francisco. Meridian, Dalton, Burgess and Vegas are in the city, and Phoenix corners the latter alone in a fast-food restaurant, having decoyed the other three away. He brutally attacks Vegas, delighted that the Halcyons' investigation means he no longer has to act in a respectable fashion. Dalton arrives in time to save Vegas' life, but is cornered in the city's sewers. Even after Burgess and Meridian join the battle Phoenix still holds the upper hand, until Meridian is finally able to use her talent to burn him from the inside.

Cleve meanwhile has been retired and moved in with his aging Batch 1 lover Blanchard, where he realises he has days to live until his advanced metabolism burns out. He decides to slip away and die on his own terms, having an overwhelming urge to head east, towards Huntsville, Alabama, seeing a strange red-haired figure on the way. In the wilderness Cleve perishes alone, having avoided the worry that his burnout might cause casualties. Blanchard believes Cleve was murdered, and warns fellow superhuman Shervain. Meridian, Burgess, Dalton and Irwin are among those at Cleve's funeral, which provokes mass mourning in his home state of Ohio. Rumours meanwhile are growing that a new batch of Mark III Optimen - the first since 2024 - are being prepared, causing nervousness among the extent Statesmen. Meridian meanwhile meets with the same figure seen by Cleve before his death, who calls himself 'The Angelus' and tells her that the current Optimen all have a dangerous design fault and gives cryptic warnings. Meanwhile, someone wearing the League of Light insignia attacks Vegas, comatose since the battle with Phoenix.

By 2064, America has slid into brutal civil war, with many fleeing north to Canada - including one-time Statesman Lejeune. The few other surviving Statesmen have largely gone into hiding in Europe, though several have been killed in the conflict and the Halcyons are believed dead.

== Statesmen ==
Hard Option (Mark I)

Soft Option (Mark II)

Batch 1 - August 1992

- Blanchard (Arkansas)
- Sterling (Kentucky)
- Laramie (Wyoming)

Batch 2 - May 1997

- Burlington (Vermont)
- Bremerton (Washington)
- Cleve (Ohio)
- Ozzy (Kansas)

Batch 3 - June 2000

- Challis (Idaho)
- La Crosse (Wisconsin)
- Ozark (Missouri)

Batch 4 - February 2004

- McKinley (Alaska)
- Paris (Texas)
- Staten (New York)
- Vegas (Nevada)

Batch 5 - February 2007

- Burbank (California)
- Elkins (West Virginia)
- Honor (Michigan)
- Monroe (Louisiana)
- Peerce (Maryland)
- Red (Rhode Island)

Batch 6 (August 2011)

- Burgess (England)
- Logan (Utah)
- Makai (Hawaii)
- Mitchell (Alabama)
- Phoenix (Arizona)

Batch 7 (March 2013)

- DuPont (Delaware)
- Hardin (Montana)
- Legare (South Carolina)
- Lejeune (Florida)
- Monhegan (Maine)
- Trenton (New Jersey)
- Winston (North Carolina)
- Wyatt (Iowa)

Batch 8 (July 2018)

- Colt (Connecticut)
- Danville (Virginia)
- Happy Jack L'Amour (North Dakota)
- Errol L'Amour (South Dakota)
- Lanais (Colorado)
- Linton (Indiana)
- Meridian (Mississippi)
- Rockford (Tennessee)
- Shervain (Oregon)

Batch 9 (April 2024)

- Blair (Nebraska)
- Claremont (New Hampshire)
- Dalton (Georgia)
- Gatsby (Minnesota)
- Holden (Pennsylvania)
- McAlester (Oklahoma)
- Salem (Massachusetts)
- Sheridan (Illinois)
- Willolane (New Mexico)

== Collected editions ==
Title	ISBN	Publisher	Release date	Contents
The Complete New Statesmen	9781853862175	Fleetway Quality	November 1990	Material from Crisis #1-14 and #28

== Reception ==
"New Statesmen" has received mixed reviews. Smith's own foreword to the 1990 collected edition felt that "like a suicide attempt, this was a desperate plea to be noticed" and generally made light of his learning curve with the series. Jeffrey Lang reviewed The Complete New Statesmen for Amazing Heroes in May 1991; while he felt the story was much improved when read in a compilation he still noted that an "annoying habit for distracting scenes and attention" aside the story was often a good superhero comic, and awarded it three stars out of five. TV Cream would later describe the story as "almost impossible to follow".
