= Black Axe (comic book) =

Comic book series published by Marvel UK in 1993

Publication information
- Publisher: Marvel UK
- Schedule: Monthly
- Format: Ongoing series
- Publication date: April 1993 – October 1993
- No. of issues: 7
- Main character(s): Black Axe

Creative team
- Written by: Simon Jowett
- Penciller(s): Edmund Perryman
- Inker(s): Rodney Ramos

Black Axe is a comic book series published by Marvel UK in 1993. It was written by Simon Jowett, with pencils by Edmund Perryman and inks by Rodney Ramos. The series was cancelled abruptly after the seventh issue.

== Publication history ==
The title was published between April and October 1993 by Marvel Comics' British imprint Marvel UK.

== Fictional character biography ==
Black Axe is an immortal who has existed for the length of human history.
