= Alan McKenzie =

British comics writer and editor

- Born: Glasgow, Scotland
- Areas: Writer, Editor
- Notable works: Brigand Doom; Journal of Luke Kirby

Alan McKenzie is a British comics writer and editor known for his work at 2000 AD.

== Biography ==
McKenzie worked for Marvel UK during the early 1980s, editing Starburst, Cinema and Doctor Who Monthly magazines. After leaving the Marvel staff in 1985, he wrote several Doctor Who comic stories for the Monthly under the pseudonym Max Stockbridge. He then wrote three non-fiction books, The Harrison Ford Story (1985), Hollywood Tricks of the Trade (1986) and How to Draw and Sell Comic Strips (1987), before contributing comic scripts to IPC's Battle Action and later 2000 AD.

In 1987, he joined the editorial team of 2000 AD as a freelancer, and from 1987 to 1994 he created a number of stories including Bradley, Brigand Doom and Journal of Luke Kirby. He also served in 1994 as the comic's editor.

== Bibliography ==
=== Comics ===
Comics work includes:

- Doctor Who (with John Ridgway):
  - "War-Game" (in Doctor Who Magazine #100-101, 1986)
  - "Funhouse" (in Doctor Who Magazine #102-103, 1986)
  - "Kane's Story" / "Abel's Story" / "The Warrior's Story" / "Frobisher's Story" (in Doctor Who Magazine #104-107, 1986)
  - "Exodus" / "Revelation" / "Genesis" (in Doctor Who Magazine #108-110, 1986)
- Tharg's Future Shocks:
  - "The Star Warriors" (with Nik Williams, in 2000 AD #517, 1987)
  - "Some One is Watching Me" (with Liam Sharp, in 2000 AD #531, 1987)
  - "Bliss" (with Mark Farmer, in 2000 AD #571, 1988)
- Universal Soldier (with Will Simpson & Brett Ewins):
  - "Universal Soldier" (in 2000 AD #537-543, 1987)
  - "Universal Soldier II" (in 2000 AD #672-682, 1990)
  - "Universal Soldier: The Indestructible Man" (in 2000 AD #750-759, 1991)
- The Journal of Luke Kirby:
  - "Summer Magic" (with John Ridgway, in 2000 AD #571-577, 1988)
  - "A Winter's Tale" (with Graham Higgins, in 2000 AD Winter Special 1, 1988)
  - "The Dark Path" (with John Ridgway, in 2000 AD Sci-Fi Special 1990)
  - "The Night Walker" (with John Ridgway, in 2000 AD #800-812, 1992)
  - "Sympathy for the Devil Prologue" (with John Ridgway, in 2000 AD #850-851, 1993)
  - "Trick or Treat" (with John Ridgway, in 2000 AD 1994 Yearbook, 1993)
  - "Sympathy for the Devil" (with Steve Parkhouse, in 2000 AD #873-877 and 884–888, 1994)
  - "The Old Straight Track" (with Steve Parkhouse, in 2000 AD #954 - 963, 1995)
  - "The Price" (with John Ridgway, in 2000 AD #972, 1995)
- Moon Runners (with Massimo Belardinelli):
  - "Moonrunners" (co-written with Steve Parkhouse, in 2000 AD #591-606, 1988)
  - "Moonrunners: Old Acquaintance" (in 2000 AD #641-644, 1989)
- Bradley (with Simon Harrison):
  - "Bradley Goes Pop" (in 2000 AD #660-682, 1990)
  - "Bradley's Bedtime Stories" (in 2000 AD #795-799, 825–827, 1992–1993)
  - "Bradley: The Sprog Prince" (in 2000 AD #885-888, 1994)
  - "Bradley: Master of the Martial Arts" (in 2000 AD #901-903, 1994)
- Brigand Doom (with Dave D'Antiquis):
  - "Brigand Doom" (in 2000 AD #717-722, 1991)
  - "Voodoo Child" (in 2000 AD #764-773, 1992)
  - "Spirits Willing" (in 2000 AD #815-818, 1992–1993)
  - "House of Games" (in 2000 AD #897-899, 1994)
  - "Account Yorga-Vampire" (in 2000 AD #932-936, 1995)
- Tales from Beyond Science (with Rian Hughes, tpb, 88 pages, Image Comics, January 2012, ISBN 1-60706-471-5) collects:
  - "The Music Man" (in 2000 AD #775, 1992)
  - "Agents of Mu-Mu" (in 2000 AD #777, 1992)
- Mean Arena: "Mean Arena" (with Anthony Williams, in 2000 AD #852-863, 1993)
- Soul Gun Warrior (with Shaky Kane):
  - "Soul Gun Warrior" (with co-writer M. Coulthard, in 2000 AD #867-872, 1993–1994)
  - "Soul Gun Assassin" (with co-writer M. Coulthard, in 2000 AD #920-925, 1994–1995)
- Tharg's Terror Tales:
  - "The Last Victim" (with Mick Austin, in 2000 AD #840, 1993)
  - "Meat is Meat" (with Mick Austin, in 2000 AD Yearbook 1994), 1993)
  - "The Succubus" (with Paul Johnson, in 2000 AD #894, 1994)
- Vector 13 (created format, with Dave D'Antiquis):
  - "Case Five: The Henderson Event" (in 2000 AD #955, 1995)
  - "Case Five: Assassin" (in 2000 AD #992, 1996)
- Chopper: "Supersurf 13" (with John Higgins, 2000 AD #964-971, 1995)

=== Books ===
Non-comics work includes:

- The Harrison Ford Story (Arbor House, 1984, ISBN 0-87795-667-7, Zomba Books, 1985, ISBN 0-946391-64-5, Air Pirate Press, 2011, ISBN 978-0-9569149-1-0)
- How to Draw and Sell Comic Strips (1987/1996/2005, Titan Books, ISBN 1-84576-076-X)
- Hollywood Tricks of the Trade (co-author, Gallery Books, 1987, ISBN 0-8317-4240-2)

Preceded by Richard Burton	2000 AD editor 1994	Succeeded by John Tomlinson
Preceded by Paul Neary	Doctor Who Magazine Editor; 1981–1985	Succeeded by Sheila Cranna
