= Kevin Cullen =

American journalist and author

- Born: May 1, 1959 (age 67); Boston, Massachusetts, U.S.
- Education: UMass Amherst
- Occupations: Journalist & author
- Employer: The Boston Globe
- Notable work: Whitey Bulger ISBN 0393347257

Kevin Cullen (born May 1, 1959) is an American journalist and author. He was a member of The Boston Globe's 2003 investigative team. The Boston Globe as an institution won a Pulitzer Prize for Public Service for coverage of the sexual abuse scandal in the Catholic archdiocese of Boston. Cullen is co-author of The New York Times bestseller Whitey Bulger: America's Most Wanted Gangster and the Manhunt That Brought Him to Justice.

On April 20, 2018, Cullen was suspended by The Boston Globe due to his fabrication of stories related to the Boston Marathon bombing, including his location during the bombing, as well as several other stories later found to be false. Cullen was suspended without pay for three months on June 15, 2018. He was also barred from making media appearances for six months and was placed under “heightened editorial scrutiny" by the Globe during any media appearances thereafter.

== Early life and education ==
Cullen was born in Boston, Massachusetts. He grew up in Malden, Massachusetts, where he attended Malden High School. In 1981, Cullen graduated summa cum laude from the University of Massachusetts Amherst with a dual degree in Journalism and Political Science and attended Trinity College in Ireland during his junior year. During his senior year, Cullen worked as a stringer for wire services such as the Associated Press.

== Journalism career ==
After graduating college, Cullen got a job at the Holyoke Transcript-Telegram. From there, he took a job at the Boston Herald, and then moved from there to The Boston Globe where he has remained. In 1988, Cullen was given a Livingston Award for Excellence in Local Reporting for his piece "Bad Boys," published in the Globe.

=== Whitey Bulger ===
Cullen began reporting on Whitey Bulger soon after joining The Boston Globe in 1985. In 1988, he was part of the Globe's investigative "Spotlight" team that exposed Bulger as an FBI informant. In 2013, he co-authored a book along with fellow journalist Shelley Murphy titled Whitey Bulger: America's Most Wanted Gangster and the Manhunt That Brought Him to Justice.

=== Northern Ireland Troubles ===
In 1997, he was appointed as the Globe's Dublin bureau chief, covering the Northern Ireland peace process, the only American journalist who did so. After a year in Dublin, Ireland, he moved to London to serve as the paper's chief European correspondent, covering the Yugoslav Wars. He reported from more than 20 countries across Europe.

=== Catholic sex abuse scandal ===
In 2001, he returned to Boston and reported news as a member of The Boston Globe's 2003 investigative team. The Boston Globe as an institution won a Pulitzer Prize for Public Service for coverage of the sexual abuse scandal in the Catholic archdiocese of Boston. The team itself won many other awards for those exposes on the Catholic sex abuse scandal, including the Goldsmith Prize for Investigative Reporting, the George Polk Award for National Reporting, and the Selden Ring Award for Investigative Reporting.

=== Boston Marathon bombing fabrications ===
On April 19, 2018, it was revealed by Boston radio host Kirk Minihane that Cullen fabricated details in his accounting of what he saw at the Boston Marathon bombing in columns he wrote for The Boston Globe, The Irish Times, and the BBC. Despite not being at the scene when the bombs went off, Cullen's portrayal of the Richard family during the marathon included several inconsistencies across his writings. The Globe placed Cullen on administrative leave a day later to determine the extent of his dishonesty. On June 15, 2018, the Globe announced that Cullen would be suspended without pay for three months, with the newspaper's editor and publisher claiming that “our review leads us to a conclusion that Mr. Cullen damaged his credibility.”

Among the reported instances of wrongdoing, in a radio interview with the BBC after the bombing, Mr. Cullen fabricated a story in which he claimed that he had spoken to a firefighter who had rescued a 7-year-old girl hurt in the bombing and carried her to an ambulance before noticing that the girl's lower leg had been severed by the bomb, at which point, according to Cullen, the firefighter "went back to the scene and he told me he crawled on his legs and his hand and his knees trying to find her leg and he couldn’t find it." The firefighter, a lieutenant with the Boston Fire Department, said that he hadn't spoken with Cullen on the day of the bombings and that the story of him searching for the child's leg was "crazy."

The Globe's review criticized Cullen for failing to take the investigation of his fabrications seriously:

And now we come to what is the most troubling episode - what to make of Mr. Cullen’s long and dramatic tale, told four months after the intensity of the bombing week to an audience of journalism educators. This is the narrative of the deputy fire chief handing Mr. Cullen his cell phone on the night of the bombing and urging him to help persuade a troubled firefighter on the other end of the phone to leave his home and come join them for a drink.

It is clear from interviews with the firefighters Mr. Cullen has cited that the episode simply did not happen. Mr. Cullen’s answer to our questions about it - that he does not remember telling that story - doesn’t change the fact that he did, as the C-SPAN video attests.

The fact that Mr. Cullen did not himself seek and review that video, easily found, raised questions for us about how seriously he takes the inevitable conclusion that the story he told is a complete fabrication.

Cullen also fabricated claims as to his location at the time of the attacks, claiming that he could "hear," "smell," and "taste" the bombings.

"I own what I did and I accept responsibility for these shortcomings and I'm sorry that it has allowed some to attack the Globe itself," said Cullen.

== Books ==
Cullen is co-author of Betrayal: The Crisis in the Catholic Church, and was a contributor to the books, Britain and Ireland: Lives Entwined II, and Our Boston, an anthology by Boston writers published in support of the victims of the Boston Marathon bombings of 2013. He and Shelley Murphy are the authors of The New York Times bestseller, Whitey Bulger: America’s Most Wanted Gangster and the Manhunt That Brought Him to Justice, published in 2013.
