= John Smith (comics writer) =

British comics writer (born 1967)

- Born: 1967 (age 58–59) Darwen, Lancashire, England
- Area: Writer
- Notable works: New Statesmen; Devlin Waugh; Indigo Prime

John Smith (born 1967) is a British comic book writer best known for his work on the weekly anthology 2000 AD and its spin-off title Crisis, particularly the Indigo Prime, Devlin Waugh and New Statesmen serials.

== Career ==
Smith's earliest published work appeared in the DC Thomson's science fiction comic Starblazer in the mid-1980s. Soon after, he became a regular contributor for 2000 AD and followed up with the political superhero serial New Statesmen for 2000 AD's spin-off title Crisis.

Many of Smith's series created for 2000 AD shared the same continuity under the umbrella of Indigo Prime, a multi-dimensional organisation that policed reality, recruiting recently dead people as its agents. The original run of Indigo Prime stories ended with "Killing Time", in which agents Winwood and Cord pursued a demon that had hitched a ride on a Victorian time machine, one of the legitimate passengers of which turned out to be Jack the Ripper. Other contributions to 2000 AD include Revere, a post-apocalyptic occult story with art by Simon Harrison, and Firekind, an anthropological science fiction story involving alien cultures and dragons, illustrated by Paul Marshall. Perhaps the best-known character created by Smith is Devlin Waugh, a flamboyantly gay exorcist, assassin, and vampire working for the Vatican of the future, co-created with artist Sean Phillips and published in 2000 AD's sister title Judge Dredd Megazine. In addition to his own creations, Smith has also contributed stories for the long-running serials Rogue Trooper and Judge Dredd.

Smith has also briefly worked in the American market. For DC Comics, he wrote an issue of Hellblazer and an 8-part mini-series Scarab, which began life as a revamp of Doctor Fate. In the early 2000s, Smith wrote a run of Vampirella comics for Harris.

== The Smithiverse ==
Examples of John Smith's cross-referencing of characters throughout his oeuvre include:

- Renegade Indigo Prime agents Fervent and Lobe originally appeared in Tyranny Rex. Although, at that point, Indigo Prime had only appeared in a single Future Shocks installment, "A Change of Scenery", Smith stated he always considered the stories taking place in the same world:
  "They were both part of the same tailor-made Universe. That was intended right from the start."
- Characters from Pussyfoot 5 originally appeared in Devlin Waugh.
- The character Mr. Cheetl originally appeared in Firekind, while Mr. Vathek, another member of the Chadarisq-Khan species, appears in Pussyfoot 5.
- Two members of Indigo Prime, Dazzler and Creed, appear in Scarab #7.
  "By that time I was probably just so sick of the thing I thought – 'Fuck it. I'll rip off my own story' – and stuck in Indigo Prime as a lazy way out."
- Winwood and Cord appear in the last few pages of Dead Eyes, uploading Danny's soul into a cloned body after the human race in his home universe (Reality 377) are killed.

== Style and influences ==
Smith's work, told in an elliptic, fractured narrative style reminiscent of Iain Sinclair or the cut-up technique of William S. Burroughs, is characterised by intricate, sometimes obscure plots and an interest in taboos and the occult.

Other notable influences include Michael Moorcock, Edgar Rice Burroughs, Alan Moore and Noël Coward.

== Bibliography ==
=== UK publishers ===
- Starblazer (anthology, DC Thomson):
  - "Head Hunter" (with Segura, in #163, 1985)
  - "Timeslay" (with Enrique Alcatena, in #168, 1986)
- 2000 AD (anthology, Fleetway/Rebellion):
  - Tharg's Future Shocks:
    - The Best of Tharg's Future Shocks (tpb, 160 pages, 2008, ISBN 1-905437-81-1) includes:
      - "Time Enough to Tell" (with Barry Kitson, in #473, 1986)
      - "Video" (with Geoff Senior, in #478, 1986)
      - "A Change of Scenery" (with Nik Williams, in #490, 1986)
      - "No Exit" (with Simon Harrison, in #559, 1988)
      - "One Man's Meat" (with Massimo Belardinelli, in #563, 1988)
      - "The Osmotic Man" (with Horacio Lalia, in #605, 1988)
      - "Opening Moves" (with Mick Austin, in #629, 1989)
      - "Earthsong" (with Steve Parkhouse, in #1480, 2006)
  - Tyranny Rex:
    - "In His Image" (with Steve Dillon, in #566–568, 1988)
    - "Under Foreign Skies" (with Steve Dillon, in #582–584, 1988)
    - "Untitled" (with Steve Dillon, in Sci-Fi Special '88, 1988)
    - "Soft Bodies" (co-written by Smith and Chris Standley, art by Will Simpson, in #595–598 and 604, 1988)
    - "Systems of Romance" (with Doug Braithwaite, in Sci-Fi Special '89, 1989)
    - "Untitled" (with Steve Sampson, in Winter Special '89, 1989)
    - "Shadowground" (prose story with illustrations by Duncan Fegredo, in Annual '91, 1990)
    - "Touched by the Hand of Brendan" (prose story with illustrations by Mark Buckingham, in Sci-Fi Special '91, 1991)
    - "A Twist in the Tale" (prose story with illustrations by Paul Marshall, in Sci-Fi Special '93, 1993)
    - "Bitter Fruit" (with Paul Marshall, in Yearbook '94, 1993)
    - "Deus Ex Machina" (with Mark Buckingham (#852–855), Paul Marshall and Richard Elson (#877–880), in #852–859 and 873–880, 1993–1994)
    - "The Comeback" (with Steve Yeowell, in #1395–1399, 2004)
  - Rogue Trooper: "Cinnabar" (with Steve Dillon, in #624–630 and 633–635, 1989) collected in Rogue Trooper: Tales of Nu-Earth Volume 4 (tpb, 288 pages, 2014, ISBN 1-78108-230-8)
  - Inside Moves (with Chris Weston, in #631, 1989)
  - Order of the Beast (with Dave D'Antiquis, in #632, 1989)
  - Indigo Prime:
    - The Complete Indigo Prime (tpb, 168 pages, DC Comics, 2005, ISBN 1-904265-42-1) collects:
      - "Fervent and Lobe: The Issigri Variations" (with Mike Hadley, in #642–649, 1989)
      - "Indigo Prime" (with Chris Weston, in #678, 1989)
      - "Winwood and Cord: Downtime" (with Chris Weston, in #680–681, 1990)
      - "Fegredo and Brecht: How the Land Died" (with Chris Weston, in #682, 1990)
      - "Fervent and Lobe: Holiday on Ice" (with Mike Hadley, in Winter Special '90, 1990)
      - "Almaranda: Solstice" (with Mike Hadley, in #720–721, 1991)
      - "Winwood and Cord: Killing Time" (with Chris Weston, in #735–744, 1991)
    - "Requiem" (prose story with illustrations by Chris Weston, in Sci-Fi Special '90, 1990)
    - "Weird Vibes" (prose story with illustrations by Pauline Doyle, in Yearbook '93, 1992)
    - "The Loa in the Machine" (prose story with illustrations by Mick Austin, in Winter Special '92, 1992)
    - Indigo Prime: Anthropocalypse (tpb, 160 pages, 2013, ISBN 1-78108-111-5) includes:
      - "Everything and More" (with Edmund Bagwell, in #1750–1753, 2011)
      - "Anthropocalypse" (with Edmund Bagwell, in #1756–1763, 2011)
    - "Perfect Day" (with Lee Carter, in #1880–1887, 2014)
    - "A Dying Art, Parts 1 and 2 (of 9)" (with Lee Carter, in #2050–2051, 2017)
      - The storyline was continued and finished by Kek-W.
  - Danzig's Inferno (with Sean Phillips, in #718–719, 1991)
  - Rogue Trooper (Friday):
    - "Hollow Town" (with Simon Coleby, in Sci-Fi Special '91, 1991)
    - "Enfleshings" (with Chris Weston, in Yearbook '93, 1992)
    - "Shock Tactics" (with Chris Weston and Mike Hadley, in Sci-Fi Special '93, 1993)
  - Revere (with Simon Harrison, in #744–749, 809–814 and 867–872, 1991; 1992; 1993–1994)
  - Doctor Sin: "The Strange Case of the Wyndham Demon" (with John Burns, in Action Special, 1992)
  - Tales from Beyond Science (with Rian Hughes, in #778–779, 1992) collected in Tales from Beyond Science (hc, 88 pages, Image, 2012, ISBN 1-60706-471-5)
  - Robo-Hunter: "Something for the Weekend, Sir?" (with Chris Weston, in Sci-Fi Special '92, 1992) collected in Robo-Hunter: The Droid Files Volume 2 (tpb, 400 pages, 2010, ISBN 1-906735-43-3)
  - Tales from Mega-City One: "Animal House" (prose story with illustrations by Chris Weston, in Sci-Fi Special '92, 1992)
  - Firekind (with Paul Marshall, in #828–840, 1993)
  - Slaughterbowl (with Paul Peart, in #842–849, 1993)
  - Judge Dredd:
    - "Hate Inc." (with Manuel Benet Blanes, in Judge Dredd Mega-Special #6, 1993) collected in Judge Dredd: The Restricted Files Volume 3 (tpb, 288 pages, 2011, ISBN 1-907992-21-9)
    - "Roadkill" (with Peter Doherty, in #856–858, 1993) collected in Judge Dredd: The Complete Case Files Volume 20 (tpb, 320 pages, 2013, ISBN 1-78108-141-7)
    - "Darkside" (with Paul Marshall, in #1017–1028, 1996–1997) collected in Judge Dredd: The Complete Case Files Volume 25 (tpb, 320 pages, 2015, ISBN 1-78108-331-2)
    - Judge Dredd: The Complete Case Files Volume 32 (tpb, 304 pages, 2018, ISBN 1-78108-661-3) includes:
      - "Survivor Type" (with Simon Davis, in #1190, 2000)
      - "New Model Phoord" (with Paul Marshall, in #1197–1199, 2000)
    - "Meatmonger " (with Siku, in #1365–1370, 2003) collected in Judge Dredd: The Complete Case Files Volume 38 (tpb, 256 pages, 2021, ISBN 1-78108-941-8)
    - "Jumped" (with Simon Fraser, in #1491–1494, 2006) collected in Judge Dredd: The Complete Case Files Volume 43 (tpb, 304 pages, 2024, ISBN 1-83786-094-7)
  - Strontium Dogs: "Fast Breeder" (prose story with illustrations by Pauline Doyle, in Sci-Fi Special '94, 1994)
  - Vector 13 (Series 5): "Case Three: Graven Images" (with Cliff Robinson, in #1064, 1997)
  - Pulp Sci-Fi: "Feast of Skin" (with Chris Weston, in #1163, 1999)
  - Pussyfoot 5:
    - "Fast Breeder" (with Nigel Raynor, in #1184–1188, 2000)
    - "Alien Sex Fiend!" (with Steve Yeowell, in #1251–1256, 2001)
  - A Love Like Blood (with Frazer Irving, in #1243–1249, 2001) collected in Storming Heaven: The Frazer Irving Collection (tpb, 144 pages, 2007, ISBN 1-904265-77-4)
  - Leatherjack (with Paul Marshall, in #1450–1467, 2005) collected as Leatherjack (tpb, 128 pages, 2007, ISBN 1-905437-31-5)
  - Dead Eyes (with Lee Carter, in #1577–1588, 2008) collected in Indigo Prime: Anthropocalypse (tpb, 160 pages, 2013, ISBN 1-78108-111-5)
  - Cradlegrave (with Edmund Bagwell, in #1633–1644, 2009) collected as Cradlegrave (tpb, 96 pages, 2011, ISBN 1-907992-46-4)
  - Tharg's Terror Tales:
    - "Blackspot" (with Edmund Bagwell, in #1801, 2012)
    - "Night Shifts" (with Peter Doherty, in #1957, 2015)
- Crisis (anthology, Fleetway):
  - New Statesmen (with Jim Baikie, Sean Phillips (#5–6, 13–14) and Duncan Fegredo (#7–8), in #1–14 and 28, 1988–1989)
    - The serial was first reprinted as an American format 5-issue limited series titled New Statesmen (1989)
    - Collected as The Complete New Statesmen (tpb, 240 pages, 1990, ISBN 1-85386-217-7)
  - Straitgate (with Sean Phillips, in #50–53, 1990)
- Judge Dredd Annual '91: "Tales from Mega-City One: Resyko" (prose story with illustrations by Sean Phillips, Fleetway, 1990)
- Revolver Romance Special: "Still Life" (with Sean Phillips, anthology, Fleetway, 1991)
- The Comic Relief Comic (among other writers and artists, one-shot, Fleetway, 1991)
- Judge Dredd Megazine (anthology, Fleetway/Rebellion):
  - Strange Cases: "Skin Games" (with John Hicklenton, in #17, 1992)
  - Devlin Waugh:
    - Devlin Waugh: Swimming in Blood (tpb, 288 pages, 2014, ISBN 1-78108-228-6) collects:
      - "Swimming in Blood" (with Sean Phillips, in vol. 2 #1–9, 1992)
      - A Judge Dredd story featuring Devlin Waugh:
        - "Brief Encounter" (with Sean Phillips, in vol. 2 #26, 1993)
      - 2000 AD: Judge Dredd Mega-Special #6: "A Love Like Blood" (prose story with illustrations by Sean Phillips, 1993)
      - Several long-form installments originally published in Judge Dredd Megazine's sister title 2000 AD:
        - "Chasing Herod" (with Steve Yeowell, in #1149–1157, 1999)
        - "Reign of Frogs" (with Steve Yeowell, in #1158–1167, 1999)
        - "Sirius Rising" (with Steve Yeowell, in #1168–1173, 1999)
      - "Mouthful of Dust" (with Michael Gaydos, in vol. 3 #72–73, 2000–2001)
    - Devlin Waugh: Red Tide (tpb, 224 pages, 2015, ISBN 1-78108-344-4) collects:
      - 2000 AD: Judge Dredd Yearbook '94: "Body and Soul" (prose story with illustrations by Sean Phillips, 1993)
      - "Red Tide" (with Colin MacNeil, in #201–213, 2003)
      - Another Judge Dredd story featuring Devlin Waugh:
        - "Bite Fight!" (with John Burns, in #224–225, 2004)
      - "Vile Bodies" (with Colin MacNeil, in #227, 2005)
      - "All Hell" (with Colin MacNeil, in #231–235 and 237, 2005)
      - "Innocence and Experience" (with Peter Doherty, in #253–256, 2007)
  - Judge Dredd:
    - Judge Dredd: Heavy Metal Dredd (tpb, 128 pages, 2009, ISBN 1-905437-96-X) includes:
      - "Mort Rifkind Rises Again" (with John Hicklenton, in vol. 2 #23, 1993)
      - "The Big Hit" (with John Hicklenton, in vol. 2 #24, 1993)
      - "Monkey Beat" (with John Hicklenton, in vol. 2 #34–35, 1993)
    - Judge Dredd: The Complete Case Files Volume 19 (tpb, 320 pages, 2012, ISBN 1-907992-96-0) includes:
      - "The Jigsaw Murders" (with Xuasus, in vol. 2 #27–29, 1993)
      - "Ladonna Fever" (with David Millgate, in vol. 2 #30, 1993)
    - Judge Dredd: The Complete Case Files Volume 24 (tpb, 320 pages, 2015, ISBN 1-78108-339-8) includes:
      - "The Ballad of Cindy Crawlskin" (with Ashley Sanders, in vol. 3 #12, 1995)
      - "Killing Grounds" (with Dean Ormston, in vol. 3 #13, 1996)
      - "Mondo Simp" (with Paul Marshall, in vol. 3 #15–16, 1996)
    - "Fetish" (with Siku, in vol. 3 #26–30, 1997) collected in Judge Dredd: The Complete Case Files Volume 26 (tpb, 320 pages, 2016, ISBN 1-78108-431-9)
    - "Old Wounds" (with Peter Doherty, in #287–288, 2009) collected in Judge Dredd: The Complete Case Files Volume 48 (tpb, 304 pages, 2025, ISBN 1-83786-607-4)
  - Judge Karyn: "Skin Games" (with Ashley Wood, in vol. 3 #8, 1995)
  - Holocaust 12 (co-written by Smith and Chris Standley):
    - "Skyfall" (with Jim Murray, in vol. 3 #20–23, 1996)
    - "Storm Warning" (with Clint Langley, in vol. 3 #29–33, 1997)
  - Tales from the Black Museum:
    - "Burn!" (with Adrian Salmon, in #247, 2006)
    - "Feeders and Eaters" (with Vince Locke, in #250, 2006)
  - Strange and Darke (with Colin MacNeil, in #319–323, 2012) collected in Brit-Cit Noir (tpb, 96 pages, 2016, ISBN 1-78108-414-9)
- Red Stains: "Passion" (short prose story for the horror anthology, 144 pages, Creation Books, 1992, ISBN 1-871592-08-9)

=== US publishers ===
- Tales of Terror #11: "Perfect Vision" (with Carol Lay, anthology, Eclipse, 1987)
- DC Comics:
  - Hellblazer #51: "Counting to Ten" (with Sean Phillips, 1992) collected in John Constantine, Hellblazer Volume 6 (tpb, 400 pages, Vertigo, 2013, ISBN 1-4012-4043-7)
  - Scarab #1–8 (with Scot Eaton, Vertigo, 1993–1994)
- Marvel:
  - Ultraforce vol. 2 #2: "The Phoenix Resurrection: Red Shift, Part 7" (with Rob Haynes, co-feature, Malibu, 1995)
  - X-Men Unlimited #35: "Triptych" (with David Finch, anthology, 2002) collected in New X-Men Companion (tpb, 432 pages, 2019, ISBN 1-302-91841-9)
- Vampirella vol. 2 (Harris):
  - "Fear of Mirrors" (with Mike Mayhew, in #4–6, 2001–2002) collected in Vampirella Masters Series Volume 3: Mark Millar (tpb, 144 pages, Dynamite, 2011, ISBN 1-60690-195-8)
  - "Hungry Ghosts" (with Dawn Brown, in #7–10, 2002)
  - "Pantha" (with Mark Texeira, co-feature in #7–10, 2002) collected in Vampirella Presents: Tales of Pantha (tpb, 128 pages, 2006, ISBN 0-910692-89-0)
  - "Wilding Sanction, Parts 1 and 2 (of 4)" (with Mike Mayhew (#11) and Manuel García (#12), in #11–12, 2002)
    - The storyline was continued and finished by Ben Raab.
  - "Blood and Roses" (with Javier Pina, in #19–21, 2003)
