= Will Simpson (comics) =

Northern Irish comics and storyboard artist

William Simpson
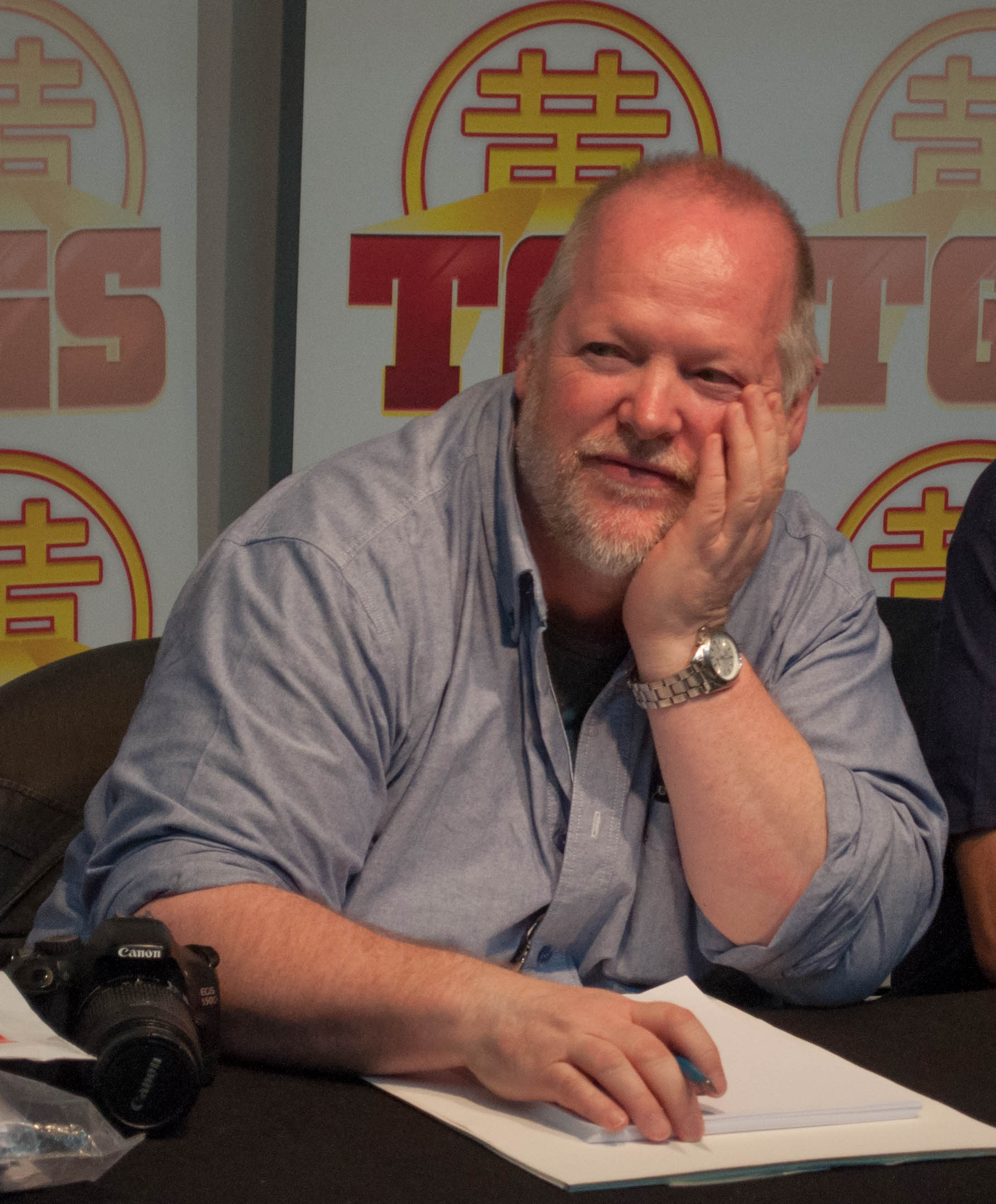
- Will Simpson (2014)
- Born: 4 July 1960 (age 66)
- Area: Artist
- Pseudonym: Will Simpson
- Notable works: Hellblazer; Game of Thrones

William "Will" Simpson is a Northern Irish comics artist and film and television storyboard and concept artist.

Born in Prehen, County Londonderry, he began his career in British comics in the 1980s, drawing "Big Ben" for Warrior magazine in 1984, Transformers for Marvel UK, work for 2000 AD, including "Judge Dredd" and "Rogue Trooper", in 1987-91, and "Sex Warrior" for Toxic! in 1991. This led to work in American comics in the 1990s, including Hellblazer and Vamps and Batman: Legends of the Dark Knight for DC Comics. In the 2000s he moved into film and television, providing storyboards and concept art for films like 24 Hours in London (2000), Reign of Fire (2002), Breakfast on Pluto (2005) and City of Ember (2008). From 2011 until 2019 he was a storyboard and concept artist for the HBO TV series Game of Thrones, for which he designed the White Walkers as well as all the show's weapons. A book of his storyboards for the series was published in 2019 by Insight Editions.

== Selected works ==
=== Comics ===
- "Cúchulainn" (script and art, with co-author Wendy Simpson (#3), in Ximoc #1-3, Blackdog Publications, 1980-1981)
- Big Ben (with Dez Skinn, in Warrior #19-26, June–December 1984)
- Tharg's Future Shocks:
  - "Nerves of Steel" (with Peter Milligan, in 2000 AD #408, March 1985, collected in The Best of Tharg's Future Shocks, 160 pages, 2008, ISBN 1-905437-81-1)
  - "The Night Shift" (with Alan Hebden, in 2000 AD #535, August 1987)
  - "Monsters!" (with Mamo-Mason, in 2000 AD #586, August 1988)
- Transformers UK #41, 47, 49, 61-62, 74-77, 80, 85, 88, 96, 100, 103, 114, 117, 130-131, 1986 Annual, 1987 Annual (Marvel UK, December 1985-September 1987)
- Judge Anderson: "Hour of the Wolf" (with writers Alan Grant/John Wagner and co-artist Barry Kitson, in 2000 AD #520-531, May–July 1987)
- Tales of Mega-City One: "Divorce" (with John Wagner, in 2000 AD #525, June 1987)
- Universal Soldier (with Alan McKenzie, in 2000 AD #537-543, August–October 1987)
- Venus Bluegenes: "The Pleasures of the Flesh" (with Grant Morrison, in 2000AD Sci-Fi Special 1988, June 1988)
- Judge Dredd:
  - "The Fall Guy" (with Alan Grant, in Judge Dredd Mega Special 1988, June 1988, collected in Judge Dredd The Restricted Files 02, June 2010, ISBN 1-906735-47-6)
  - "A Letter to Judge Dredd" (with John Wagner, in 2000 AD #661, 1990)
  - "Tale of the Dead Man" (with John Wagner, in 2000 AD #662-665, 1990)
  - "The Gipper's Big Night" (with Alan Grant, in Judge Dredd Megazine vol. 1 #10, July 1991, collected in Judge Dredd The Complete Case Files 15, June 2010, ISBN 1-906735-47-6)
  - "The Chief Judge’s Man" (with John Wagner, in 2000 AD #1244-1247, 2001)
- Tyranny Rex: "Soft Bodies" (with John Smith, in 2000 AD #595-604, October–December 1988)
- Rogue Trooper (Friday) (with Dave Gibbons):
  - "The War Machine Part 1" (in 2000 AD #650-653, 1989)
  - "The War Machine Part 2" (in 2000 AD #667-671, 1990)
  - "The War Machine Part 3" (in 2000 AD #683-687, 1990)
- "Summer's End" (with Igor Goldkind, in Revolver: The Horror Special, October 1990)
- Sex Warrior (with Pat Mills/Tony Skinner):
  - "Crimes of Passion" (in Toxic! #9-11, May–June 1991)
  - "The Steroid Factor" (in Toxic! #19-22, August 1991)
- Hellblazer #41-47, 50, 52-55, 59-61, 75 (with Garth Ennis, Vertigo, May 1991 – March 1994) collected as:
  - Dangerous Habits (collects #41-46, 1998, ISBN 1-56389-150-6)
  - Bloodlines (collects #47, 52-55, 59-61, 2007, ISBN 1-4012-1514-9)
  - Damnation's Flame (collects #75, 1999, ISBN 1-56389-508-0)
- Excalibur #52 (pencils, with writer Alan Davis and inks by Dave Hoover/Jimmy Palmiotti, Marvel Comics, July 1992)
- Aliens: Rogue (with Ian Edginton, 4-issue limited series, Dark Horse Comics, April–July 1993, tpb, 112 pages, 1995, ISBN 1-56971-023-6, 1997, ISBN 1-56971-267-0)
- Animal Man #64-65 (art (#65), with writer Jamie Delano with inks by Dan Steffan (#64), Vertigo, October–November 1993)
- Vamps (with Elaine Lee, 6-issue limited series, Vertigo, August 1994 - January 1995, tpb, January 1996, ISBN 1563892200)
  - Vamps: Hollywood & Vein (with Elaine Lee, 6-issue limited series, Vertigo, February–July 1996)
  - Vamps: Pumpkin Time (with Elaine Lee, 3-issue mini-series, Vertigo, December 1998 - February 1999)
- The Punisher 2099 #14, 27 (with Pat Mills/Tony Skinner, Marvel Comics, March 1994 and April 1995)
- Indiana Jones and the Spear of Destiny #1 (pencils, with writer Elaine Lee and inks by Dan Spiegle, Dark Horse Comics, April 1995)
- Batman: Legends of the Dark Knight #91-93 (with Garth Ennis, DC Comics, February–April 1997)
- Witch World "The Anatomist" (with Gordon Rennie, in 2000 AD #1055-1058, August–September 1997)
- "We Meet at Twelve" (with P. J. Kryfko, in Outlaw Territory, Volume 1, graphic novel, Image Comics, June 2009, ISBN 1607060043)

=== Film ===
- 24 Hours in London (2000)
- Puckoon (2002)
- Reign of Fire (2002)
- You Looking at Me? (2003)
- Squaddie (2004)
- Nailed (2006)
- The Hotel Trade (2007)
- How About You (2007)
- Closing the Ring (2007)
- City of Ember (2008)

=== Television ===
- Game of Thrones (2011-2019 end)
