= Tharg's Future Shocks =

Comic strip

Cover to Alan Moore's Shocking Futures by Kevin O'Neill.

Tharg's Future Shocks is a long-running series of short strips appearing in the British weekly comic 2000 AD since 1977. The name originates from the fictional editor of 2000 AD and the book titled Future Shock, written by Alvin Toffler, published in 1970.

== Publishing history ==
The series began in issue 25 of 2000 AD titled "Tharg's Future Shocks" in a single short story written by Steve Moore, who also created the format. This established the pattern of the series which would be two- or three-page short stories, which were normally self-contained.

These stories would be a testing ground for new artists and writers and creators resulting in the stories having a very mixed level of quality. Authors such as Peter Milligan, Alan Davis, Alan Moore, and Grant Morrison found some of their earliest work published as Future Shocks.

=== Spin-offs ===
Some characters proved popular enough to either appear in their own stories, or have multiple appearances in Future Shocks, such as Alec Trench, Bradley, D.R. and Quinch and Abelard Snazz.

=== Similar series ===
2000 AD also begat several other science fiction and horror short stories under several different titles, including Time Twisters. Examples of the others include:

- Bob Byrne's Twisted Tales
- Future Shorts, single page Future Shocks
- Past Imperfect
- Pulp Sci-Fi
- Ro-Jaws Robo Tales, stories presented by Ro-Jaws
- Tales from Beyond Science, a short run series all drawn by Rian Hughes
- Tales from the Black Museum, an equivalent set in Mega-City One
- Tales of Telguuth, a series of fantasy tales set on a distant planet, written by Steve Moore
- Tharg's Terror Tales, covering horror, that still occasionally appears
- Time Twisters, single episode stories, with a focus on time travel and subsequent paradoxes
- Vector 13 although wrapped in its own story stretching beyond the series, it still featured one off stories largely focused on anomalous or paranormal phenomena

== Collected editions ==
The stories have been collected into a number of trade paperbacks:

Two collections of Alan Moore's Future Shocks (Alan Moore's Shocking Futures) and Time Twisters (Alan Moore's Twisted Times) stories were released by Titan Books in 1986:

- Alan Moore's Shocking Futures (1986), Titan Books; reprints a selection of Future Shocks short strips originally published in 2000 AD between 1981 and 1983, with various artists. ISBN 0-907610-71-4
- Alan Moore's Twisted Times (1987), Titan Books; reprints almost all of Moore's Abelard Snazz strips, and a further selection of Time Twisters short strips originally published in 2000 AD between 1980 and 1983, with various artists. ISBN 0-907610-72-2

The contents of those two volumes have been collected together into a single volume, along with additional material from Moore:

- The Complete Future Shocks (tpb, Rebellion Developments, 2006 ISBN 1-904265-88-X)

Despite the title, this is not a complete collection of all Future Shock stories from the comic, only the Alan Moore stories in the 1986 and 1987 books described above.

All the Future Shocks written by Peter Milligan, John Smith, and Neil Gaiman and around half of Grant Morrison's were collected in:

- The Best of Tharg's Future Shocks (160 pages, November 2008, ISBN 1-905437-81-1)

A series of paperbacks collecting all Future Shocks is being published by Rebellion:

- The Complete Future Shocks Volume 1 (320 pages, July 2018, ISBN 1781085595) covers 1977–1981
- The Complete Future Shocks Volume 2 (272 pages, August 2019, ISBN 1781086834) covers 1981–1982
