= Just 1 Page =

Annual charity comic

Publication information
- Publisher: Adrian Brown
- Publication date: 2001–2006
- No. of issues: 4

Creative team
- Written by: Mike Carey, Alex de Campi, Warren Ellis, Steve Gerber, Peter Hogan, Eddie Robson
- Artist(s): Charlie Adlard, David Baillie, Adrian Bamforth, Leo Baxendale, Mike Collins, Howard Cruse, Al Davison, Richard Elson, Hunt Emerson, Duncan Fegredo, Simon Furman, Peter Gross, Mike Hawthorne, David Hitchcock, P. J. Holden, Dylan Horrocks, Frazer Irving, D'Israeli, Jock, Rich Johnston, Euan Kerr, Roger Langridge, Jamie McKelvie, Gary Spencer Millidge, Lise Myhre, Gary Northfield, Warren Pleece, Steve Pugh, Lew Stringer, Andi Watson, Chris Weston, Rob Williams, Phil Winslade, Brian Wood, Steve Yeowell
- Editor: Adrian Brown

Just 1 Page (J1P) was charity comic linked to the United Kingdom's Comic Festival and Comic Expo comic book conventions in Bristol, SW England. Single-page contributions were donated by a range of professional and amateur artists and writers, including many notable UK creators. Just 1 Page, produced by Adrian "Ade" Brown, published four issues, each one on a specific theme, in the period 2001–2006.

The first Just 1 Page comic, published in 2001, raised about £500 for the Comic Book Legal Defense Fund and Comic Relief. Just 1 Page 2 (2003) raised £800 for the Trinity Hospice in Clapham. Just 1 Page 3 (2005) raised £600 for Childline.

Notable contributions were:

- A picture of a race between DC's Flash, Marvel's Quicksilver and Road Runner from Looney Tunes, drawn by Alan Davis.
- A page where Steve Gerber's Howard the Duck and Destroyer Duck appear at a comics convention. This was drawn by Phil Winslade and was used by Gerber and Winslade in preparation for the Marvel Max series starring Howard.
- Three statues by Jesse Farrell: one of Alan Moore and Kevin O'Neill's The League of Extraordinary Gentlemen; one of Paul Grist's Jack Staff and a third of Shaun of the Dead battling a zombie.

Connected to the Just 1 Page project was the 24 Minute Comic, a high-speed variation of the 24-hour comic, in which twenty-four artists collaborated by drawing a page each during a twenty-four-minute period. The first 24 Minute Comic, which included such contributors as Roger Langridge, Gary Northfield, and David Baillie, was produced for the 2005 UK Web & Mini Comix Thing. A second 24 Minute Comic was also later produced.

== Issues ==
Issue	Date	Title/theme	Contributors	Charity
Just 1 Page 1	2001	Heroes	Simon Perrins (Alan Moore as Swamp Thing), Natalie Sandells (Morbius), Paul Holden (Lord Peter Flint, Warlord), Jim McGee (Mike Allred), Robin Rossigneux (Son Goku from Dragon Ball Z), Kevin Garnett (Sin City), David Goodman (Stan Sakai), Lisa Jurucich / Xyzandra (Katchoo and Francine), Bobby Cheung (X-Men), Arthur Goodman (various), Al Davison (variouser and variouser), Tatiana Gill (Tintin), Espen Jorgensen / Geir Moen (The Maxx & John Constantine), Jens Altmann (Groo the Wanderer), Peter Hogan (script) / Tony Rollinson (art) (Alex Toth), Mike Carey (script) / Adrian Brown (art) (Little Nemo), Dylan Horrocks (Charlie Brown), Howard Cruse (Lulu Moppet), Hunt Emerson (J. Wellington Wimpy), Larry Young (Chris Staros, Jamie S. Rich) (answers) illustrated by Rich Johnston & Ade Brown, Sam Gaffin (The Anomalies), Brian Laframboise (Captain Marvel), Dave West (Hellboy), Steve Pugh (Rabbit & Lois), Steve Yeowell (Jack Kirby & Ian Kennedy), D'Israeli (Thor), Mike Collins (Spider-Man), Darren Clarke (Elastic Man / Fantastic Four), Andi Watson (Mitsuru Adachi), Steve Gerber / Phil Winslade (it's a secret), Bjorn T. Boe / Lise Myhre (Wolverine), Duncan Fegredo (Alex Toth), Mal Jones (Footsoldiers), Brian Wood (Buddy Bradley), Lawrence Rider (Hewligan's Haircut), Warren Ellis (script) / Steve Pugh (art), Adrian Brown (Lloyd Macadam)	Comic Book Legal Defense Fund and Comic Relief
Just 1 Page 2	2003	Brits	Rogan, Gringo & Nesha, Graham Hill (Adam Eterno), Ade Brown, Tim Twelves (Minnie the Minx), Daniel Lundie (Ozzy Unbourne), Paul Ridgon & Simon Furman (Dragon's Claws), Bill Naylor (Dan Dare, The Spider, Robot Archie), Dave Willacy (Death's Head), Al Davison (The Spirit), Gary Northfield (Rupert Bear), Bart Croonenborghs (Storm), Joel Meadows (The Trigan Empire), Chris Weston (Don Lawrence), Ali Pulling (& Bill Naylor) (Dan Dare), Peter Hogan (& Bill Naylor (Dandy Beezer), Arthur Goodman (Tornado & Bob Monkhouse), Steve Pugh (Billy the Cat and Katie), Peter Gross & Matt Peckham (Lucifer & Mazikeen), Craig McGill (Grant Morrison), Kevin Sanders (King Mob), Hector Lima & Marcelo Garcia (St. Swithin's Day), Neville Coleman (Angela), Emma Jane Connolly (Rupert Bear), David Goodman (Tiger Tim), Dave Windett (Wallace and Gromit), Charlie Adlard (James Bond), Adi Tantimedh (Modesty Blaise), Kevin Sanders (The Killer), Mike Hawthorne & Andrew Wheeler (Tara Chace), Iain Thomas (Judge Dredd in Liverpool), Matthew Craig & Natalie Sandells (Judge Dredd meets Doctor Who), Richard Wood (Jimp in Mega City), Mark Stephenson & Tony Rollinson (Zenith), Stuart McCarthy (Doomlord), Michael Kevan (Sláine), Ted Wing & John Mazzeo (Miracle Man), Dan Fish (Desperate Dan & Minnie the Minx), Euan Kerr (The Beano), Leo Baxendale (The Beano), Lee "Budgie" Barnett (The Bash Street Kids' Mr. S. Potter), Mike Carey (Wham! and Smash!), Gary Spencer Millidge (The Cloak), Sean Azzopardi (Faceache), Ade Brown (The Numskulls), Rob Croonenborghs (Tank Girl), Rob Williams & Trev Hairsine, Tim Bisley, Bevis Musson (Jenny Sparks), Cath Tomlinson (Misty), Jamie McKelvie (Halo Jones), Martin Eden (Jenny Sparks), Dave West (Miss Scarlet), Fred (Alan Moore), Ninth Art (Alan Moore), David Jones (Watchmen), Sam Hart (Promethea), Adrian Bamforth (Eve for Vendetta), Arni Gunnarsson (Luther Arkwright & Bryan Talbot), Simon Perrins (Timothy Hunter & Dead Boy Detectives), Hunt Emerson (Andy Capp), Rob Cave & Tony Miers (Toy Boy), Rich Johnston (Billy's Boots), The Lad Done Brilliant (Football comics), David Baillie (Captain Britain), JIM aka 2wyce Shy (Captain Britain), Patrick Findlay (Trelawny), Alex de Campi (John Constantine), David Hitchcock (John Constantine), Jock (John Constantine), Michael Karpas & Bobby Vala (John Constantine / Keanu Reeves), Kevin Garnett (various), Mark Peyton (Sandman), Aristes Iliopoulos (Sandman), Paul Holden (Alf Tupper), John (Gideon Stargrave, Mirkin, Paradax), Daniel Lundie & Jesse Farrell (Dennis the Menace and Gnasher), Len O'Grady (Fungus the Bogeyman), Jesse Farrell (Jack Staff)	Trinity Hospice in Clapham
Just 1 Page 3	2005	Team-ups and Battles	Adrian Bamforth (Superman & Obelix), Alex de Campi (Wonder Woman & Tank Girl), Aris Iliopoulos, Bevis Musson (Storm vs. Wonder Woman), Bobby Vala & Michael Karpas (The Authority), Brian Crowley (John Constantine & Hellboy), Bridgeen Gillespie (Cerebus & The Hulk), Carl Brown, Cath Tomlinson, Charlie Adlard (Thor vs. Asterix & Obelix), Dan Fish (Ambush Bug vs. Animal Man), Daniel Lundie (Batman & Superman), Dave Windett (Totally Spies meets Danger Mouse), David Baillie (All of Comics vs. Dr. Fredric Wertham), David Hitchcock (Satan & Gabriel from Constanteen vs. John Constantine AND The Hulk vs. The Thing), Drashko Roganovich, Eddie Robson & Simon Logan (or is it Penter?) (We3 vs. Woodstock, Snoopy, Garfield), Felipe Sobreiro (Lobo & RanXerox), Frazer Irving, Futurequake (Monster Squad & "friends"), Gary Northfield, Gene Poonyo (The Minx vs. Alice (from Resident Evil), Graeme Reid (Punisher vs. Tintin & Co.), Graham Hill (Supermen), Grant Cross (Judge Dredd & Hellboy vs. Judge Death), Grant Springford (The Defenders and Co.), Hunt Emerson (Plastic Man and the Mighty Atom), Indio (The Menace vs. The Thing), Jason Sobol (Daredevil vs. Elektra vs. The Hand), Jim Whelok, Joacy Jamys (Best Battle?), Jock, Joel Meadows, John "Swampgas" (Spider-Man vs. the world), Johnny X (Grant Morrison vs. Alan Moore AND another to be confirmed), Lee "Budgie" Barnett vs. Jamie McKelvie, Lew Stringer (Aunt May vs. Namor), Mark Peyton & Mal Jones (Planetary vs. The League of Extraordinary Gentlemen), Martin Eden (The O Men versus The X-Men), Mike Carey (24), Mike Collins (Lobo vs. The Littlest Hobo), Paul Palmer, Paul Ridgon (Deadpool / Snake Eyes), Phil Winslade (Wolverine vs Killraven), Richard Elson (Sagat (Street Fighter) vs. Tetsuo (Akira), Rob Croonenborgh (The Maximortal vs. El Guano), Rob Williams, Roger Langridge, Roger Mason, Roxane Grant (Optimus Prime and Bender from Futurama), Sean Azzopardi, Sam Hart (Batman vs. Lobo), Simon Penter (FutureQuake and We3), Simon Perrins (The Watcher & Phantom Stranger), Stuart McCarthy, Stuart Tipples (MONKEYS GO APE!), Tim Seelig, Warren Pleece	Childline
Just 1 Page 4	2006	World	Stu.Art Tipples, England (Hellblazer/Hellraiser), Roger Mason, "France" (France vs. England), P. J. Holden, Northern Ireland (Master of Kung Fu), Dan Fish, Japan (Godzilla & Giant Robot), Adrian Bamforth, England (Billy the Fish), Cabral (Brazil), Human Torch vs. Iceman), Bevis Musson, England (Victoria and David Beckham), Cath Tomlinson, Republic of Ireland (Midnighter/Batman as Jones/Gascoigne), Graeme Reid, Scotland (Hulk vs. Pierluigi Collina), Dave Windett, "Japan" (Ninja 9), Tim Seelig, "Italy" (Pierluigi Collina), Douglas Noble, Scotland (Look Out for Lefty), Leonardo Aragao, Brazil (Luke Cage), Hector Lima, Brazil (Doom, Zenith & others), Sandro Castelli, Brazil (Wonder Woman cheers Brazil), Sam Hart, "Team USA" (Judge Dredd vs. American football), Barry Renshaw, England (Wayne Rooney vs. Predator), Al Ewing, England (Galactus & Mister Fantastic), Indio, "The World" (Galactus with the World), Nick Ellis, Australia (and Greece!) (Socceroos [Australia men's national soccer team] and the 300 Spartans), Délio Freire & Jean Diaz, Brazil (Ronaldinho, Sting, Alfred E. Neuman), Marcio Massula Jr. and Antonio Eder, Brazil (KABBALAH FC Alan Moore, Aleister Crowley, et al), Rafa Gallardo, Brazil (X-Men in training for the World Cup, The Lad Done Brilliant, England & "Sweden" (Sven's Saturday Comes), (Doctor Who and the history of the World Cup)	
