= Matt Timson =

British comic book artist

- Born: 20th century
- Areas: Penciller, Inker, Colorist

Matt Timson is a British comic book artist who resides in Leicester.

== Biography ==
Timson has done a lot of work (especially covers) for British small press comics including Solar Wind, The End Is Nigh and FutureQuake, as well as working as a freelance illustrator.

In recent years he has begun to get professional comics work, on Popgun with Leah Moore and John Reppion, and most recently on Impaler, after the title moved from Image Comics to Top Cow. Comics critic Timothy Callahan in a review of Impaler #3 said:

his work on "Impaler" is startlingly evocative. His fully painted (or mixed-media) art shifts from bloody violence to haunting melancholy to pastel cheerlessness. He can do murky action scenes and crisply colored diner sequences with consistent beauty. It's a savage beauty, appropriate to a horror-action comic, but it's one that recalls Dave McKean mixed with Bill Sienkiewicz mixed with Frazer Irving. ... He's an artist to keep an eye on, to be sure.

== Bibliography ==
=== Comics ===
Interior comics work includes:

- "The Ripper" (written by Arthur Wyatt, in FutureQuake #1, 2003)
- "The Omnocular Man" (written by Paul Scott, in Solar Wind #2, 2003 & #3, 2004)
- "54 Jones" (written by Paul Scott, in Omnivistascope Model One, 2005 & Model Two, 2006)
- "Labour 7" (in Twelve a - retelling of the 12 tasks of Herakles)
- "The Last War" (written by Al Ewing, in The End Is Nigh #2, 2005)
- "Death Squid" (written by Paul Scott, in Solar Wind #1, 2003 & #2, 2003)
- Gutsville #2 (written by Simon Spurrier, with art by Frazer Irving, Image Comics, 2007)
- "Deadeye" (written by Leah Moore and John Reppion, in Popgun #1 and 2, Image Comics, 2007, 2008)
- Impaler (with William Harms, 5-issue limited series, Top Cow Productions, December 2008 - March 2010, ongoing, tpb, 160 pages, August 2010, ISBN 1-60706-101-5)
- "Zip" (with Andi Ewington and 44 other artists, in Forty-Five, anthology graphic novel, Com.x, February 2010, ISBN 1-61584-713-8)
- The Darkness #89 (with Joshua Hale Fialkov, Top Cow, January 2011)

=== Covers ===
- Solar Wind #1
- The End Is Nigh #1 (right)
- FutureQuake #4
- Violent #8
- Omnivistascope Model One

== Awards ==
- 2010: Nominated for "Favourite Newcomer Artist" Eagle Award
