= Arthur Wyatt (writer) =

- Wyatt at the 2026 Rose City Comic Con
- Areas: Writer, Editor
- Notable works: Futurequake

Arthur Wyatt is a writer for British comic 2000 AD, creating stories mostly in the Future Shock format and in the Judge Dredd universe, including the comicbook sequels to the 2012 Dredd movie. Wyatt was also selected as one of 2005's five best new comic book writers, contributing to the 2000AD Winter Special.

Wyatt is also the founder of small press title FutureQuake. He edited and wrote large parts of the first three issues and continues to contribute scripts.

== Bibliography ==
=== Small Press ===
- "Emigration" (with Adrian Bamforth, in FutureQuake #1, 2003)
- "Hail To The King" (with Mike Donaldson, in FutureQuake #1, 2003)
- "Talent Show" (with Mike Donaldson, in FutureQuake #1, 2003)
- "The Ripper" (with Matt Timson, in FutureQuake #1, 2003)
- "H.P. Lovecraft's World of Cosmic Terror" (with Michael Molcher, in Brute & Beastly, 2003)
- "The Hunter" (with Michael Molcher, in FutureQuake #2, 2004)
- "Down The Tubes" (with Adrian Bamforth, in FutureQuake #2, 2004)
- "The Other Side" (with Mike Donaldson, in FutureQuake #2, 2004)
- "Extinction Level Event" (with Tim Twelves, in FutureQuake #3, 2004)
- "Punch" (with Mark Wilson, in FutureQuake #3, 2004)
- "Outer Space" (with Adrian Bamforth, in FutureQuake #3, 2004)
- "Marz Starz" (with Ed Traquino, in FutureQuake #4, 2005)
- Bad Company: "The Lucky One" (with Paul Martin, in Zarjaz (vol. 1) #2, 2005)
- "Domestic Bliss" (with Simon Penter, in FutureQuake #5, 2005)
- "The Great Warlord Sugi" (with Peter Anckorn, in FutureQuake #6, 2006)
- "The painting" (with Vicky Stonebridge, in Something Wicked #1, 2006)
- Future Short: "First Contact" (with David Gray, in Zarjaz (vol. 2) #3, 2006)

=== 2000 AD ===
- Past Imperfect: "Cosmonaut X" (with pencils by Laurence Campbell and inks by Kris Justice, in 2000 AD #1376, 2004)
- "Road Warrior" (with Inaki Miranda/Eva de la Cruz, in 2000 AD Winter Special 2005)
- Terror Tales:
  - "Cold Spots" (with John Cooper, in 2000 AD #1494, 2006)
  - "Bad Blood" (with Lee Carter, in 2000 AD #1539, 2007)
  - "The Talisman" (with Duane Redhead, in 2000 AD #1575, 2008)
  - "Futurity" (with Cliff Robinson, in 2000 AD #1599, 2008)
  - "Pea Patch Podlings" (with Edmund Bagwell, in 2000 AD #1674, March 2010)
  - "Menhir" (with Graeme Neil Reid, in 2000 AD #1713, December 2010)
- Tharg's Future Shocks:
  - "Natural Order" (with Edmund Bagwell, in 2000 AD #1527, 2007)
  - "Yggdrassil" (with Vince Locke, in 2000 AD #1561, 2007)
  - "Rapture Ready" (with Edmund Bagwell, in 2000 AD #1576, 2008)
  - "Scablands" (with Robin Smith, in 2000 AD #1607, 2008)
  - "Legacy System" (with Robin Smith, in 2000 AD #1640, 2009)
  - "Cargo Culture" (with Edmund Bagwell, in 2000 AD #1664, December 2009)
  - "Intestinauts" (With Pye Parr, in 2000 AD #1822, March, 2013)
- The 86ers: "Under Pressure" (with PJ Holden, in 2000 AD #1625-1630, March–April 2009)
- Tales from the Black Museum:
  - "Rat Runs" (with Nick Dyer, in Judge Dredd Megazine #286, July 2009)
  - "The Shadow Over James Block" (with Tiernen Trevallion, in Judge Dredd Megazine #289, October 2009)
  - "Heart of Iron" (with PJ Holden, in Judge Dredd Megazine #291, December 2009)
  - "Purgation" (with Jon Davis-Hunt, in Judge Dredd Megazine #299, July 2010)
- Samizdat Squad (with Paul Marshall and Paul J Holden):
  - "Black Flowers" (in Judge Dredd Megazine #305-308, January–March 2011)
  - "Red Skies" (in Judge Dredd Megazine #311-314, June–September 2011)
  - "Grey Zone" (in Judge Dredd Megazine #323-326, May–Aug 2012)
- Tharg's 3rillers: "Wolves" (with Steve Yeowell, in 2000 AD #1746-1748, August 2011)
- Judge Dredd: "Inversion" (with David Roach, in Judge Dredd Megazine #332, January 2013)
- "The Streets of Dan Francisco" (with Paul Marshall, in Judge Dredd Megazine #335-#339, April–August 2013)
- Dredd: "Underbelly" (with Henry Flint, in Judge Dredd Megazine #340-#342, September–November 2013)
- Dredd: "Uprise" (with Henry Flint, in Judge Dredd Megazine #350-, July 2014 onwards)
