= Zarjaz (disambiguation) =

Zarjaz may refer to:

- Zarjaz, an invented slang word in 2000 AD meaning "excellent"
- Zarjaz, a 1986 shoot'em up released by Ariolasoft/Reaktör Software for the Commodore 64
- Zarjaz, a 2000 AD fanzine
- Zarjazz, a 1980s record label started by Madness and named after the slang word
