= Day of the Dogs =

2005 novel by Andrew Cartmel

- Author: Andrew Cartmel
- Cover artist: Karl Richardson
- Series: Strontium Dog
- Genre: Science fiction
- Publisher: Black Flame
- Publication date: July 2005
- Pages: 256
- ISBN: 1844162184
- Preceded by: Ruthless
- Followed by: A Fistful of Strontium

Day of the Dogs is an original novel written by Andrew Cartmel and based on the long-running British science fiction comic strip Strontium Dog.

== Synopsis ==
Johnny Alpha and Middenface McNulty are hired by wealthy wild west aficionado Asdoel Zo to track down Preacher Tarkettle, the man who killed his family. Alpha and McNulty recruit a squad of Strontium Dogs to assist them on the mission, but all is not what it seems with Zo, and they soon find a traitor in their midst.
