= UK Web & Mini Comix Thing =

Caption
- Status: Defunct
- Genre: Comics
- Venue: Great Hall, Queen Mary University of London
- Location: London
- Country: United Kingdom
- Inaugurated: March 20, 2004
- Most recent: March 27, 2010; 16 years ago
- Attendance: 400 (2006)
- Organizer: Patrick Findlay
- Website: www.ukwebcomixthing.co.uk

UK Web & Mini Comix Thing (familiarly known as The Thing) was an annual comics convention specializing in British small press comics. Produced from 2004 to 2010, always in the month of March, the convention's venue was typically the Great Hall of Queen Mary University of London. The event's organizer was David Findlay, who was based in Slough, Berkshire.

The Thing showcased webcomics, minicomics, graphic novels, comic books, and zines created by independent artists and publishers. The show focused on the art of comics, and unlike traditional comic book conventions, did not feature cosplaying, collectibles, back-issue dealers, or mainstream superhero publishers. Instead, the show centered around an artist alley-style exhibition space that featured up to 100 vendors, as well as industry-related panel discussions.

One feature of the event was "a reading room set aside for people to read a range of free comix, as well as their new purchases." From 2006 to 2010, a themed anthology was produced, made up of comics by the event's exhibitors.

In an interview, Findlay explained the genesis of the show:

The Thing was conceived as an event to showcase what was at the time a new industry, the webcomic, with the traditional homemade comic attached. At the time there were virtually no exhibitions, not proper ones. Inspired by events such as MoCCA and SPX in the USA, I saw a clear opportunity for a similarly styled UK event. It was conceived along the simple idea that the event featured a hall of tables with exhibitors showing their stuff. This simple premise ... is the reason why the show has been able to sustain itself over the years.

The first 24 Minute Comic (a high-speed variation of the 24-hour comic) — in which twenty-four artists collaborated by drawing a page each during a twenty-four-minute period — was produced at the 2005 UK Web & Mini Comix Thing. Contributors included Roger Langridge, Gary Northfield, and David Baillie. (The 24 Minute Comic was connected with Just 1 Page charity comic project.)

The 2006 event attracted 400 attendees.

After the 2010 event, the organizer wrote on the event's official website: "There will be no more Things as the hall is no longer available for hire and my brain is fried. There are some options for using other venues but I think it's probably best to call it a day."

== Dates and guests ==
- 2004 (March 20) (The Octagon, Queen Mary University of London, Stepney, London, UK) — guests included Al Davison, Roger Langridge, and Gary Spencer Millidge
- 2005 (March 19) — guests included Roger Langridge, Gary Northfield, and David Baillie
- 2006 (March 11)
- 2007 (March 17)
- 2008 (March 22)
- 2009 (March 28) — guests include Richard Stevens, Meredith Gran, Sarah McIntyre, Woodrow Phoenix, James Turner, Phillippa Rice, Kate Beaton, Liz Greenfield, and John Allison
- 2010 (March 27) — exhibitors include Roger Langridge

== See also ==
- British small press comics
