= FutureQuake =

British small press comic book

Cover to FutureQuake issue 7, by Oliver Redding.

FutureQuake was a British small press comic book founded by Arthur Wyatt, and later edited by Richmond Clements, David Evans and Owen Watts. Dedicated to showcasing work by new writers and artists, they published mostly self-contained comic stories, generally of 5 pages or less and usually of a sci-fi/fantasy/horror bent.

Under their FutureQuake Press imprint (FQP) they also published the Japanese Manga-influenced anthology Manga Quake and the horror comic Something Wicked. FQP also published other comics, and took over Dog breath, the Strontium Dog fanzine and Zarjaz, the general 2000 AD fanzine.

39 issues of FutureQuake were published until publication went on hiatus following the death of David Evans in May 2021.

== Contributors ==
FutureQuake played host to a wide range of contributors, including first time writers and artists, up-and-coming small press personalities and established creators. Issues featured the likes of Alan Grant, Arthur Ranson, Al Ewing, Stewart McKenny, PJ Holden, Arthur Wyatt, Inaki Miranda & Eva de la Cruz, Adrian Bamforth, Matt Timson, Michael Molcher, Paul Scott and Charlie Adlard.

== Staff ==
The FutureQuake editorial team at the Bristol Comic Expo 2006. From left to right: Richmond Clements, Edward Berridge and David Evans.

In 2021, FutureQuake staff included art/commissioning editor Dave Evans, script editor Richmond Clements, editor Owen Watts, and webmaster Barny Shergold.

Previous members include founder and sole editor for issues 1-3 Arthur Wyatt, script editor James Mackay, and script editor Edward Berridge.

== Awards ==
- 2007: Nominated for the "Favourite Black & White Comicbook" Eagle Award
- 2008: Nominated for the "Favourite Black and White Comicbook" Eagle Award
- 2010: Nominated for the "Favourite Black and White Comicbook" Eagle Award
- 2011: Nominated for the "Favourite British Comicbook: Black and White" Eagle Award (as were FutureQuake Publishing's 2000 AD fanzines Zarjaz and Dogbreath)
- 2012: Nominated for the "Favourite British Comicbook: Black and White" Eagle Award (as was FutureQuake Publishing's 2000 AD fanzines Zarjaz)
- Fanzine of the Month in SFX for FutureQuake #5
- Fanzine of the Month in SFX for MangaQuake #2
- Fanzine of the Month in SFX.

== See also ==
- Hi-Ex, Inverness-based comic convention organised by Richmond Clements
