= Murderdrome =

Murderdrome is the title of a mobile comic created by Al Ewing and PJ Holden. It is an ironic pastiche of certain British 'boys adventure' comics of the late seventies, particularly Action. It contains scenes of on-panel decapitation and extremely over-the-top dialogue.

The series is notable because it is one of the first comics to be drawn specifically for the iPhone with the intention of distribution through the App Store. This has been made possible by the "Comic Reader App" developed for the iPhone by Infurious Comics. However, the Murderdrome project is surrounded by controversy as 'Murderdrome' has been rejected by Apple on the grounds of 'objectionable content'. Although Apple have defended this decision, it has been described by some as blatant censorship.

However, the publicity got the Comic Reader App attention, which resulted in NBC licensing it for their Heroes comics. This led the BBC to suggest that "Mr Holden and his colleagues may have accidentally hit upon what could be the future of comic book publishing.
