= Solar Wind (comics) =

British comics anthology

Publication information
- Format: Ongoing series
- Genre: Science fiction
- Publication date: 2003 – 2007
- No. of issues: 8

Creative team
- Written by: Paul Scott

Solar Wind was a British small press comics anthology. Edited by Cosmic Ray (a pseudonym for small press comics publisher Paul Scott), the comic is devoted to gentle parodies of British boys' comics of the 1970s and 80s. Eight issues in all were produced between 2003 and 2007, with the final issue published in November 2007 as the Solar Wind Summer Special.

Emerging originally from the fanbase of best selling British comic 2000AD, Solar Wind has featured writers and artists including Gordon Rennie, Rufus Dayglo, Al Ewing and PJ Holden.

== Collected editions ==
The comics have been collected in The Bumper Book of Solar Wind Volume 1 and 2, available at Lulu.com.

== Reception ==
Don't let anyone tell you different: Solar Wind is the funniest comic of the decade. - Comics International #161

=== Awards ===
In 2004, the title won the Best Independent Comic Award at the British Diamond Comics Awards.

In 2006, Solar Wind was nominated for the Eagle Awards for best British Black and White comic.

The comic was three times SFX Fanzine of the Month.

== Spin-offs ==
Solar Wind has two direct spin-off publications - Big War Comic (1 issue) and Sunny For Girls (2 issues). The same small-press publisher also produces Omnivistascope comics.
