= The End Is Nigh (fanzine) =

The End is Nigh
- Editor: Michael Molcher
- Categories: Apocalypse
- Frequency: Yearly
- First issue: Summer 2005
- Final issue: 2006
- Country: United Kingdom

The End Is Nigh was an annual British fanzine edited by Michael Molcher. It was launched at the Bristol Comic Expo in 2005 and, since becoming a semi-annual publication, each subsequent issue is also launched there.

It deals with the End of the World, each issue dealing with differently themed Apocalypses. The contents range from articles to sequential art, with contributors drawn from both comics and magazines.

== Issues ==
Past, present and future issues include:

- Summer 2005 – the first issue was about zombies and zombidom. Cover by Matt Timson.
- Winter 2005 – the second issue had a war theme. It includes interviews with Alan Moore and also with John Wagner and Alan Grant (about their series The Last American). The cover is by Boo Cook.
- Summer 2006 – the third issue is on threats from space, including dangers from meteorites, aliens and includes an interview with Lembit Öpik. The cover is by Oliver Redding.
- October 2009 – the fourth issue is not themed and, in a break with previous issues, will be published through internet print-on-demand service Lulu.com.

== Contributors ==
The magazines includes work from artists and writers from the British comic and magazine industry, for example 2000AD and the Fortean Times as well as the British small press comics scene.

Contributors include:

- Leah Moore
- John Reppion
- Gordon Rennie
- Frazer Irving
- Jock
- Cavan Scott
- Al Ewing
- Jason Brashill
- Paul Scott
- Edward Berridge

== Press ==
On Monday 12 December 2005 Leah Moore, John Reppion and Al Ewing signed copies at OK Comics in Leeds, an event which made the Yorkshire Evening Post.

== Reviews ==
- "This fat collection of articles and strips looks very slick and is terrific value for money" – Comics International No. 192
- "The second issue of this post-apocalyptic fanzine more than matches the standard of the first. This time the theme is war, and there are a lot of comic strips and features based around that, as well as some more general pieces of satire. The big thing of note is an exclusive interview with Alan Moore about all things apocalyptic, but overall this is about as professional a job as a fanzine can get – great layout, fantastic art and genuinely interesting, well-written content. Wonderful!" – SFX magazine #140-page 10. Named Fanzine of the Month

== Praise ==
The End Is Nigh has garnered praise from comic industry figures including:

- "Truly a book of revelations... although judging from the energy and enthusiasm crackling around this ambitious independent, the end is far from nigh. Highly recommended", Alan Moore
- "I am *yet again* bowled-over at the sheer brilliance of this little gem. The amount of research, creativity and thought that's gone into it leaps off every page, and the sheer wealth of content means it'll continue to be my Bogside Browser of choice for months to come. Funny, intriguing, often surreal and genuinely informative. Swee-poib. ", Simon Spurrier

== Origin of name ==
The phrase 'The End is Nigh' derives from a man who could often be seen walking up and down London's Oxford Street wearing a sandwich board, or carrying a placard on a pole, bearing the phrase. The main meaning was purely religious – he was warning of the 'impending' Christian vision of Apocalypse – but the phrase has since entered the popular consciousness as a slightly derogatory term for someone or something warning of impending doom.
