= Dogbreath =

Zarjaz

Publication information
- Publisher: Dr. Bob; FutureQuake Press
- Schedule: Twice yearly
- Format: Ongoing series
- Genre: Science fiction
- Publication date: 1997 -
- No. of issues: 24 (as of July 2015)
- Editor(s): Dr. Bob; Dave Evans; Richmond Clements

Dogbreath is a fanzine dedicated to the 2000 AD series Strontium Dog.

== Publication history ==
Dogbreath was started by Dr Bob (Amanda Kear), who had been writing Strontium Dog fan fiction since 1981. Her experience with getting other work published in other fanzines (covering, for example, Doctor Who and Blake's 7) made her realise that she could create her own publication devoted to Strontium Dog.

After 14 issues, over 8 years, she handed over the reins to members of the FutureQuake Press (FQP) team.

== Creators ==
Dogbreath contributors during Dr Bob’s editorship who have gone on to be art and script droids for 2000 AD itself include Rufus Dayglo and Al Ewing. Scott Montgomery has written a few articles for the Judge Dredd Megazine and works for The Dandy.

== Issues ==
Issue 1 of Dogbreath came out in 1997. It contained some pre-written fanfics by Dr Bob, Allan J. Sim, and specially written fanfic by Gary Loveridge, plus a specially written chronology of the Strontium Dog universe by Dr Bob. Inspired by the latter, and with Stront data provided by Dr Bob, James Norton wrote "Tax Return" – a spoof tax demand from the Inland Revenue's cartoon character 'Hector', used in adverts of the time. This was later, in turn. to inspire John Wagner to write "The Tax Dodge" for 2000 AD, which was drawn by Carlos Ezquerra, the first page of which was a version of the original tax demand letter that was redone by James Norton. Issue 1 also contained a Helltrekker parody written by Dr Bob, Val Douglas and Jackie Marshall. All the art (except Hector) was done by Dr Bob.

Issue 2 came out in late spring/early summer of 1998. Several new contributors, including Gary Simpson and David Morris who became regulars, wrote and drew material for it. It had a normal and a 'glow-in-the-dark, nude variant' cover, drawn by David Morris. This was the Gronkinator robot with and without his covering of fake fur, and with glow-in-the-dark stickers added.

Issue 3 was published in 1999. Subsequent issues came out roughly every 6 months, and contained comic strips as well as the usual cartoons, pin-ups, articles and fanfic. Issue 12 contained a photo story featuring action figures of Johnny Alpha & Durham Red. Issue 14 (spring 2005) was the last one produced by Dr Bob.

Issue 15, the first by the FutureQuake team of Dave Evans and Richmond Clements, was published at the end of 2006. However, this is an external publication to the FQP brand, though sharing close ties.

== Availability ==
A number of back issues can be bought FutureQuake shop and at various British comic conventions.

== Awards ==
Dogbreath was nominated for the "Favourite British Comicbook: Black and White" Eagle Award in 2011.

== See also ==
- Zarjaz, the 2000 AD fanzine
