= Zarjaz =

Publication information
- Publisher: vol. 1 Andrew J. Lewis vol. 2 Underfire Comics; FutureQuake Press
- Schedule: Twice yearly
- Format: Ongoing series
- Genre: Science fiction
- Publication date: vol. 1: Sept. 2001 - May 2004 vol. 2: May 2005 -
- No. of issues: vol. 1: 5 vol. 2: 30 (as of July 2015)
- Editor(s): Andrew J. Lewis; Colin J. Dinnie; Dave Evans; Richmond Clements

Zarjaz is a comics anthology fanzine for the long-running British science fiction comic 2000 AD.

== Publication history ==
Zarjaz was started in 2001 by Andrew J. Lewis. The fanzine contained comic strips based on various 2000 AD characters and also ran an in-depth interview with writer Alan Moore. There were contributions from established 2000 AD creators like Alan Grant and gave a start to others such as Adrian Bamforth and Simon Spurrier. It was originally printed in A4 format and reproduced cheaply giving it something of the feel of the original 2000 AD comic as it appeared in the 70s and early 80s. Issues 3 and 4 were printed in the smaller A5 size in an attempt to keep costs low and were published simultaneously.

After four issues, Zarjaz was re-launched in 2005 by Colin J. Dinnie under the Underfire Comics banner, with whom he had previously edited the small press anthology Rapid Fire. The new run produced seven issues edited by Dinnie in A5 format and with colour covers.

Zarjaz was then taken on by a new team led by Dave Evans and was produced and published by FutureQuake Publishing starting in May 2008. The team also took over publication of Dogbreath, the Strontium Dog fanzine at issue #15 (December 2006).

Following the death of Evans, Zarjaz was put on indefinite hold.

In 2023 original editor Andrew J Lewis announced that he would be reviving the title with a relaunch planned for August 2024. The comic will once again be published in the larger A4 size for the first time since its original issues. It will be rebranded as Zarjaz Vol.3.

== Contributors ==
Contributors have come both from mainstream comics and the small press and include Alan Grant, PJ Holden, Al Ewing and Arthur Wyatt and has helped showcase for some of the newest generation of 2000 AD writers and artists like Simon Spurrier, Adrian Bamforth and Nick Dyer.

It has also featured interviews with major 2000 AD talent (from the past and present) including Alan Moore, Alan Grant and Frazer Irving.

There have also been stories which have been picked up and continued in Zarjaz like Al Ewing's "Bones of Eden", the first issue of which appeared in the 2000 AD Winter Special 2005.

== Availability ==
Zarjaz was published twice yearly and sold in comic shops around the UK, including Forbidden Planet, as well as through the internet and mail order. The relaunched version is also available on subscription.

== Andrew J. Lewis ==
Andrew J. Lewis, the author of Zarjaz, is a writer, musician and artist. Comics written by him include two Tharg's Future Shocks stories: "Goldie Locke & the Three B.E.A.R.s" (with art by Boo Cook, in 2000 AD #1288, 2002) and "Escape" (with pencils by Gary Crutchley and inks by Cliff Robinson, in 2000 AD #1410, 2004).

== Awards ==
In 2002 Zarjaz won the "Best Self-Published/Independent" National Comics Award at the annual Bristol Comic Festival and came second to Jack Staff in 2003. It was also nominated for the "Favourite British Comicbook: Black and White" Eagle Award in 2011.

== See also ==
- Dogbreath, the Strontium Dog fanzine
