= Resident Alien (comics) =

Comic book series by Peter Hogan and Steve Parkhouse

- Portion of the cover to volume 1, issue 1 by Steve Parkhouse

Publication information
- Publisher: Dark Horse Comics
- Schedule: Monthly
- Title(s): Welcome to Earth! The Suicide Blonde; The Sam Hain Mystery; The Man with No Name; An Alien in New York; Your Ride's Here; The Book of Love; The Book of Life; The Book of Changes; One More for the Road
- Formats: Original material for the series has been published as a set of limited series.
- Genre: Cosy; Mystery
- Publication date: Welcome to Earth! April–July 2012; The Suicide Blonde; August–November 2013; The Sam Hain Mystery; April–July 2015; The Man with No Name; September–December 2016; An Alien in New York; April–July 2018; Your Ride's Here; November 2020–May 2021; The Book of Love; November 2022–February 2023; The Book of Life; June–September 2024; The Book of Changes; August–December 2025 "One More for the Road"; April 2026
- Number of issues: 39

Creative team
- Writer(s): Peter Hogan
- Artist(s): Steve Parkhouse
- Editor(s): Philip R Simon

Resident Alien is an American comic book series created by Peter Hogan and Steve Parkhouse. The series was published by Dark Horse Comics in 8 installments of four-issue miniseries and 1 six-issue miniseries, from 2012 to 2025.

The story is about an alien who crash lands on Earth, then poses as a doctor while he awaits a rescue. He is pursued by a government agency and passes his time solving murders and other mysteries. The series has received positive reviews from critics, particularly for Parkhouse's ability to draw expressions.

A television adaptation for Syfy starring Alan Tudyk premiered on January 27, 2021.

== Publication history ==
=== Development ===
Parkhouse and Hogan had previously collaborated on five issues of The Dreaming for Vertigo comics in 1999, and Hogan had been wanting to collaborate again. When Hogan asked Parkhouse what kind of project he would like to do, Parkhouse suggested something with an alien. The two worked closely on the broader aspects of the plot, but Hogan developed most of the story. Dark Horse Publisher Mike Richardson provided editorial input that helped Hogan and Parkhouse find the right tone for the narrative.

Hogan felt the depiction of "aliens as monsters or invaders had become stale" and wanted to bring a "sympathetic attitude to a nonhuman character". He also wanted to mix the science fiction and mystery genres to get some "interesting sparks". He drew inspiration from Twin Peaks, The Man Who Fell to Earth, and My Favorite Martian, and he specifically requested Parkhouse base the design for the main character upon aliens from DC Comics published in the early 1960s, such as Chameleon Boy.

The title came from a conversation Hogan had many years earlier with an English friend who was married to an American. When asked if he had a green card, the friend instead showed an ID that read "Resident Alien". Hogan thought the phrase was funny and would make a great title.

=== Publication ===
Because Parkhouse was unable to maintain the work pace necessary for a monthly series, Resident Alien was published as a series of four-issue miniseries. Hogan said a new miniseries each year is "the best balance for us, though I sometimes wish we could squeeze in another issue or two". For the first three miniseries, the first chapter was serialized in the anthology series Dark Horse Presents before being collected as issue zero. Issues are then published monthly, and a trade paperback collection is released shortly after the miniseries concludes.

The first chapter was serialized in Dark Horse Presents vol 2 #4–6 (October – December 2011). When it was collected as Resident Alien #0 in April 2012, it was the 268th best selling issue of the month with estimated orders around 4,800 copies. Issue #1, released the following month, had estimated orders of about 5,700. The collected volume was released February 27, 2013 with the subtitle Welcome to Earth!.

The second miniseries followed a similar publication schedule. The first chapter of the second miniseries, subtitled The Suicide Blonde, was serialized in Dark Horse Presents vol 2 #18–20 (November 2012 – January 2013) before being reprinted as issue zero in August 2013. The first issue, published the following month, had estimated orders of about 3,900. The 104-page trade paperback was released on May 28, 2014.

The third miniseries, subtitled The Sam Hain Mystery, was written before the second miniseries began publication. Parkhouse got the idea for a detective named "Sam Hain" from Neil Gaiman in 1990 during a conversation about the holiday Samhain. When he decided to write a fictional detective into Resident Alien, he asked Gaiman for permission before using the name. The first chapter was serialized in Dark Horse Presents vol 3 #1–3 (August – October 2014) and reprinted as issue zero on April 29, 2015. The trade paperback was released on November 11, 2015.

A fourth miniseries, The Man With No Name, began in September 2016 and was followed by a fifth miniseries, An Alien in New York, which began in April 2018. Instead of serializing the first chapter and starting with a zero issue, these miniseries were numbered one through four. A sixth miniseries, Your Ride's Here, premiered in 2020 and was planned as the story's conclusion. The success of the television adaptation led to a seventh miniseries, The Book of Love, in 2022, an eighth miniseries, The Book of Life in 2024, and a ninth miniseries, The Book of Changes in 2025.

The series concluded in April 2026, with the one-shot issue "One More for the Road".

== Collected editions ==
Resident Alien has been collected in a series of trade paperback releases.

Miniseries	Issues	Issues Released	TPB release	TPB ISBN	Note
Welcome to Earth!	0–3	April–July 2012	February 27, 2013	978-1616550172	Issue # 0 was serialized in Dark Horse Presents v2 #4-6 (October – December 2011)
The Suicide Blonde	0–3	August–November 2014	May 28, 2014	978-1621159513	Issue # 0 was serialized in Dark Horse Presents v2 #18-20 (November 2012 – January 2013)
The Sam Hain Mystery	0–3	April–July 2015	November 11, 2015	978-1630083113	Issue # 0 was serialized in Dark Horse Presents v3 #1-3 (August – October 2014)
The Man with No Name	1–4	September–December 2016	April 19, 2017	978-1506701530	
An Alien in New York	1–4	April–July 2018	November 21, 2018	978-1506705651	
Your Ride's Here	1–6	November 2020–May 2021	June 2, 2021	978-1506713229	
The Book of Love	1–4	November 2022–February 2023	June 22, 2023	978-1506733708	
The Book of Life	1–4	June–September 2024	January 28, 2025	978-1506745459	
The Book of Changes	1–4	August–December 2025	August 18, 2026	978-1506753454	Includes one-shot finale "One More for the Road"

Resident Alien has also been collected in the following Omnibus editions.

Title	Material Collected	Publication date	ISBN
Resident Alien Omnibus Volume 1	Resident Alien #0-3, Resident Alien: The Suicide Blonde #0-3, and Resident Alien: The Sam Hain Mystery #0-3	August 18, 2020	978-1506720432
Resident Alien Omnibus Volume 2	Resident Alien: The Man with No Name #1-4, Resident Alien: An Alien in New York #1-4, Resident Alien: Your Ride's Here #1-6, and The Ghost from Free Comic Book Day 2022	May 18, 2023	978-1506734507

== Plot ==
Flashbacks

Narrative flashbacks interspersed throughout the series provide the background to the plot. Captain Hah Re, an alien biologist, is shot down by a fighter plane and crashes in the Southwestern United States desert. At night, he takes money from an ATM and it captures his face on video. Men in black who are investigating his crash site learn of the image and begin to track him by the ATM bills. Hah Re has empathic abilities that prevent others from noticing his odd appearance. Six months later, Hah Re uses advanced technology to win one million dollars from a slot machine in Las Vegas. The men in black lose track of him but assume he will continue moving in the same direction toward the Oregon-Washington area.

One year after his crash, Hah Re has taught himself English and human anatomy, among other things. He has also developed an interest in mystery novels and films. Taking the identity "Harry Vanderspeigle", he introduces himself as a retired doctor and buys a remote cabin near Patience, Washington.

Welcome to Earth!

Three years after Harry's crash, the only doctor in Patience is murdered. The town mayor and sheriff ask Harry to examine the body and temporarily fill in as town doctor. Harry's mental abilities allow him to detect the emotions of his patients and to know when they lie. When the police arrest an innocent man for the doctor's murder, Harry tries to locate the true killer. Harry is unsuccessful, but his attempts worry the murderer, who attacks him. Harry is saved by the police and one of his nurses, Asta Twelvetrees. Asta is the daughter of a Mohawk shaman and is able to partially see through Harry's disguise, but mistakes him for a visiting spirit instead of an alien. At her father's advice, she does not tell Harry what she knows. Harry realizes he has been lonely and agrees to stay on the job.

The Suicide Blonde

A former lover comes to the mayor for financial help when she becomes pregnant by another man. He gives her $500, and the next morning she is found dead from poison in a Patience hotel. The room is staged to look like a suicide, but the police quickly realize another person had been in the room. To help the mayor, whom he has befriended, Harry travels with Asta to the young woman's apartment in Seattle to look for clues. They learn she killed herself after a fight with her lesbian partner, who was present for the suicide. She confesses to tampering with the crime scene and is arrested. While in Seattle, picture of Harry with Asta is unintentionally taken in a park. The photographer posts the picture online, where it is seen by the men in black.

The Sam Hain Mystery

The men in black do not have a clear picture of Asta, so they contact nearby police to see if she can be identified as part of a counterfeiting investigation. When they get to Patience, the sheriff recognizes but does not identify her. Because of his response, the men in black mark Patience as a potential site for their investigations. Meanwhile, Harry learns a popular pseudonymous mystery writer from the 1960s lives in Patience. After some research, he believes he has identified her and visits her to get confirmation. She admits the truth and they talk about her books. The writer's granddaughter is able to see through Harry's disguise and later draws a picture of him.

The Man with No Name

Harry has dinner with Asta and her father, Dan Twelvetrees. Privately, Dan shows Harry the image of him from Seattle, which Asta has not seen. Harry is scared and wants to flee, but Dan convinces him to remain. Dan is not frightened by Harry, and offers to be a confidant. A meth lab explodes in Patience and a homeless man from Los Angeles is caught in the fire. Before he dies, he mentions a daughter to Harry. Harry, feeling an obligation to the man, uses a detective agency in Los Angeles to learn the full names of the man's family members. Harry realizes the daughter lives in Patience and was connected to the meth lab, and she is arrested.

An Alien in New York

A nurse at Harry's office frames the child's picture of Harry and hangs it prominently. Harry recognizes alien writing in paintings by a reclusive New York artist who has not been seen for twenty years. The writing leads him to the artist's agent and lover. The artist died several years prior, but she kept the phone line open hoping someone could read his journal and explain his suicide to her. Through the journal, Harry learns the artist was never able to accept Earth as home. He leaves the agent and decides to start living as though he will never be rescued. Meanwhile, the men in black have limited their search for Asta to seven suspects. The lead agent is assigned to Patience.

Your Ride's Here

Harry receives an invitation to Amanda and Bradley's wedding with a small picture of the alien drawing by Amanda's daughter, Honey. He gets nervous about the child showing up at the wedding. As Asta is becoming romantically interested in Harry, her dad warns her that agents are closing in on Harry's location. An agent finds one of Honey's alien drawings and begins spying on Harry. After Amanda and Bradley's wedding, they leave Honey with Amanda's mom during their honeymoon, but Honey is abducted by her dad. Harry and the police find her and Honey's father is arrested. The agent contacts Harry to arrange a meeting, revealing he actually wants to help. When other aliens arrive to rescue Harry, Harry realizes he no longer belongs with them and he lets the agent take his place. Asta and Harry begin a romantic relationship, agreeing to proceed with it slowly.

The Book of Love

The Book of Love follows the alien detective Harry's attempts to navigate love. As the government agency that was trailing Harry decides to back off, his life in Patience quiets down a little. Harry and Asta grow closer, and romance blooms between the two.

== Critical reception ==
Miniseries	Comic Book Roundup
Welcome to Earth!	7.6/10
The Suicide Blonde	7.9/10
The Sam Hain Mystery	7.9/10
The Man with No Name	7.6/10
An Alien in New York	7.7/10
Your Rides Here	7.5/10
The Book of Love	8.0/10
The Book of Life	8.0/10

The series has received mostly positive reviews from critics, and many of them have praised the comic's focus on small-town life. Adventures in Poor Taste described the story's scope as "pretty small," and Comic Vine' agreed it was "a talking head book... but it's extremely satisfying on that level" Multiversity Comics said the "well used premise successfully avoids stereotypical trappings." Bloody Disgusting liked the lack of focus on comedy, which is common to most stories about an alien trapped on Earth. In a review of The Suicide Blonde, Unleash the Fanboy wished the galactic origins and new life as a detective were more closely connected, since "neither is developed enough to stand on [its] own". Geeks of Doom felt the character development and the shift in Harry's motives between Welcome to Earth! and The Suicide Blonde was well managed. The story was favorably compared to the television show Murder, She Wrote by Comicosity, which recommended to any reader who enjoyed mysteries.

According to Comic Vine, Parkhouse's art style "fits incredibly well with the story". He was lauded for his work on facial expressions, and Newsarama drew comparisons to the style of comic artist Dave Gibbons. Parkhouse's art was described as a classic style with a "timeless design" by Bloody Disgusting, and Comicosity felt it captured the slow moving lifestyle of a small town. Comic Book Resources thought the "cohesive, attractive pages" were largely due to Parkhouse handling the color and letter duties in addition to the pencils, and went on to say the colors are an integral part of the story. Adventures in Poor Taste disagreed, saying "some of the coloring is cringe worthy" and "the people don’t look lifelike".

When the first miniseries debuted, critics criticized the initial issue being #0 instead of #1, calling it "potentially confusing", "ridiculous", and "insanely frustrating for any person picking this book up for the first time". Newsarama feared some readers picking up #1 would rather pass on the miniseries than try to locate the back issue. Bloody Disgusting disagreed, saying that the first issue of Welcome to Earth! could be understood without reading the zeroth issue, although some information would obviously be left out. Opinions softened with later miniseries, and Newsarama described The Sam Hain Mystery #0 as "not essential, but a good jumping on point". The concept was still confusing for Bam Smack Pow, who would have preferred if story points from the prior miniseries had been better summarized.

== Television adaptation ==
In March 2013, Hogan said that he was in discussions with unspecified parties to adapt the comics series into a television series. In March 2015, Dark Horse editor and Vice President of Publishing Randy Stradley said that Hollywood was still showing interest in adapting the series. Syfy ordered a pilot for the series in May 2018. Produced as a joint venture by Universal Cable Productions, Dark Horse Entertainment, and Amblin Television, the show was adapted for television by Chris Sheridan. Sheridan is one of the show's executive producers, along with Mike Richardson, Keith Goldberg, Justin Falvey, and Darryl Frank. Production began on October 1, 2018, with Alan Tudyk starring as Harry. The cast also includes Corey Reynolds as Sheriff Mike Thompson and Alice Wetterlund as D'Arcy Bloom. As part of the adaptation process, the fictional setting of Patience was relocated from Washington to Colorado. The series was originally planned to premiere in mid-2020, but its premiere was delayed to January 27, 2021, due to the COVID-19 pandemic. In March 2021, the series was renewed for a second season. It ultimately ran for four seasons; in July 2025, Sheridan confirmed that the fourth season would be the last.
