= Strontium Dog: The Killing =

1984 video game

- Developer: Channel 8 Software
- Publisher: Quicksilva
- Series: Strontium Dog
- Platform: ZX Spectrum
- Release: EU: 1984
- Genre: Action
- Mode: Single-player

Strontium Dog: The Killing is an action game developed by Channel 8 Software and published by Quicksilva. The game was released for the ZX Spectrum in 1984.

== Plot ==
The game is based on the story of the same name from the British comic book series "Strontium Dog", which is published in 2000 AD magazine. The game stars Johnny Alpha, one of the mutant bounty hunters known as "strontium dogs". He undertakes a dangerous mission on the alien planet Zed, located somewhere at the center of the Milky Way galaxy.

The game begins with an introductory scene showing the dictators of Zed announcing the start of an annual ritual called "The Killing". During this event, the dictators sacrifice a victim and stage a contest between killers from every corner of the galaxy. The participants, who are criminals with bounties on their heads, must fight to the death in a city serving as the killing ground. The sole survivor of the contest is awarded a substantial monetary prize.

Johnny Alpha enters the contest with the dual objectives of collecting bounties on the criminal participants and ultimately destroying the dictators of Zed to put an end to their brutal ritual.

== Gameplay ==
Strontium Dog: The Killing is an action game set in a large maze consisting of 256 rooms, arranged in a 16x16 grid. The player controls the main character, Johnny Alpha, as he navigates through the maze to find and eliminate alien killers. The rooms, also referred to as sectors, are relatively similar in design. The objective is to explore the maze, locate the enemies, and kill them while avoiding their attacks.

The gameplay primarily takes place in two types of rooms: those with central passages and those serving as passageways to other sectors. In rooms with central passages enemies run down the sides of the room and fire energy bolts that bounce and travel in a diamond shape, making tighter loops before expiring. The player must dodge these bolts while attempting to shoot the enemies, which is largely based on chance. Character cannot move while firing.

In passageway rooms, enemies can also appear and ambush Johnny, immediately opening fire upon spotting him. The game features a single difficulty level and is considered challenging due to its size and the ease with which players can become lost. To aid in navigation and ensure all enemies are found, players are encouraged to create their own maps of the maze.

Johnny Alpha is equipped with a laser gun that has unlimited charges and three electro-flares. The player begins the game with four lives, and losing all lives results in a game over, returning the player to the intro screen.

The game's display shows the current room and the main character, with a status panel located in the top left corner. This panel provides information such as the player's score in bounty points, the current sector number, the number of lives remaining, and the count of enemies still alive, which starts at 93.

== Development ==
Mark Eyles, a Creative Design Executive at Southampton-based Quicksilva, was considering the British comic magazine 2000 AD characters for a video game adaptation. Although Judge Dredd was the first choice, Games Workshop had already licensed the rights. Consequently, Quicksilva opted for Strontium Dog, a popular and long-running series in the magazine. After securing the license from 2000 AD's publishers, IPC Magazines, Quicksilva developed Strontium Dog and the Death Gauntlet for the Commodore 64.

Concurrently, in April 1984, John Williams, the managing director of Channel 8 Software and a fan of 2000 AD, conceived the idea for a video game based on one of the Strontium Dog storylines. He assigned the project to Paul Hargreaves, a 15-year-old programmer from Leyland who had previously developed Borzak, published by Channel 8. Hargreaves worked on the game during evenings, weekends, and school holidays, completing it in August 1984.

Following the completion of Channel 8's Strontium Dog game, Williams and Hargreaves traveled to London to pitch their product to IPC Magazines. The game was evaluated and deemed a solid offering. Upon learning that Quicksilva already held the Strontium Dog license and had developed their own game, Channel 8 representatives contacted Quicksilva, and the two companies agreed to collaborate, with Quicksilva publishing Channel 8's game.

== Reception ==
Reception

Review scores
| Publication | Score |
|---|---|
| Crash | 42% |
| Computer and Video Games | 27/40 |
| Tilt | 11/15 |
| Your Spectrum | 4/15 |
| Sinclair Programs | 62% |
| Home Computing Weekly | 4/5 stars |

Strontium Dog: The Killing received mixed reviews from critics. Computer and Video Games praised the graphics, particularly the well-drawn and animated depiction of the Johnny Alpha character, which was recognizable from the 2000 AD comics. However, the magazine criticized the limited documentation, noting that the instruction manual was very brief and Quicksilva suggested reading back issues of the comic to fill in the gaps. The game was characterized as entertaining but difficult to play.

Your Spectrum reviewers found the gameplay tedious, with the player wandering aimlessly and only occasionally engaging in combat. They wrote that the game, despite its size, lacked substantial content.

Crash magazine's reviewer was critical of the game, stating that it consisted mainly of empty or repetitive rooms with flashing force fields. The reviewer noted the needlessly ruthless opening routine involving human sacrifice and criticized the jerky graphics, poor sound, and lack of animation. The game's confusing layout and unbalanced enemy difficulty were also mentioned as issues. The reviewer found the game colorful but lacking in original and appealing elements, ultimately deeming it a disappointment.

Sinclair Programs described the game's maze as simple to map but intricate, requiring both luck and skill to defeat enemies. The reviewer suggested that the game might not appeal to everyone.

Home Computing Weekly said that graphics and sound were 'extremely good'. The enemies were described as standard but powerful. However, the originality was criticized, with the game structure being compared to Atic Atac.
