= Middenface McNulty =

Fictional character

Archibald "Middenface" McNulty is a fictional character from the series Strontium Dog appearing in the British comic anthology 2000 AD, as well as his own spin-off series. He is a frequent companion of the series' star, Johnny Alpha.

== Plot ==
The story is set in 22nd-century Scotland, which has been warped by radioactive fallout where mutants are the underclass of future Britain. McNulty grew up in the Scottish mutant ghetto called Shytehill (a reference to Sighthill - the Scottish slang term for shit is 'shite').

Middenface gets his nickname from his signature mutation – his skull is covered in hard, knobby bumps which range in size, number and density depending on the artist. Although this mutation is usually portrayed in the comics as purely cosmetic, there have been instances where Middenface shows to have an unnaturally hard skull. Either dealing blows with it or sustaining blows to it that would kill a normal man.

Like all the members of the Search/Destroy agency he is a seasoned guerrilla fighter. He has had experience in fighting for his life, leading attacks, and defending himself and others against fanatical hatred and violence since the age of ten.

He first appeared in Portrait of a Mutant, the Scottish leader of the rebels in the mutant war and an ally of a young Johnny Alpha. After the war, he became a Search Destroy Agent and first appeared in the present day in Outlaw; he appeared infrequently after this, and after the death of Johnny's partner Wulf Sternhammer, McNulty would become Johnny's new partner in many strips. Initially, he had a running gag of his Scottish dialect being incomprehensible to the English characters but this would be dialed down – his hooligan ways would continue to be a source of humour though.

In "The Life and Death of Johnny Alpha" in 2010, a retired Middenface was shown with a genuine drinking problem following Johnny Alpha's death.

== Young Middenface ==
Young Middenface was a long-running black and white strip featured in Judge Dredd Megazine. Alan Grant wrote and created the story. It was drawn by various artists, the last one being Shaun Thomas. Ellie De Ville provided lettering.

The strip begins with a young, teenage McNulty as a juvenile delinquent on the streets of Shytehill. The story follows him in his path to becoming a mutant guerilla and eventually the leader, filling in the gaps before his debut in "Portrait of a Mutant". Forced into guerilla activism after becoming a fugitive, he becomes a highly violent and reckless soldier. The deaths of many of his friends fuel his hatred for the mutant-killing Kreeler police.

Eventually, with the threat of the genocidal Sir William "Stinking Billy" Cumberland (the name and nickname of the Duke of Cumberland who crushed the 1745 Jacobite uprising in Scotland) becoming Head of Kreelers in Scotland, the Scottish Mutant Army launches an uprising. They overrun the Kreelers, capture multiple cities and then the Scottish Parliament building (still not fully paid for in the 2160s), but are unprepared when Cumberland simply blows up Parliament instead. Kreeler reinforcements forces the mutants into a retreat, making a last stand at Killoden theme park where they are massacred in their tens of thousands. On the back of this, Cumberland becomes First Minister of Scotland. Middenface and the surviving resistors continue to fight and at last succeed in assassinating Cumberland.

The stories make use of Scots slang and dialect and the storylines often subtly (or otherwise) refer to contemporary Scottish politics, society and culture. "Brigadoom!" and "'Midnapped!", parody the musical Brigadoon and the classic Robert Louis Stevenson Scottish novel Kidnapped, but with twists. The mystical village of Brigadoom is made up entirely of cannibals led by Sawney Bean, who happen to break into song for no reason.

== Bibliography ==
As well as appearances in Strontium Dog (comics and audiodramas), he has also appeared in Strontium Dogs, Young Middenface, Dogbreath, and his own eponymous series in the Judge Dredd Megazine.

Strontium Dog (by John Wagner, Alan Grant, and Carlos Ezquerra):

- "Portrait Of A Mutant" #200–206, 210–221 (1981)
- "Outlaw!" #363–385 (1984)
- "The Big Bust Of ’49" #415–424 (1985)
- "Rage" #469–489 (1986)
- "Warzone!" #497–499 (1986)
- "The Rammy" #544–553 (1987)

(written by Grant alone):

- "The Stone Killers" (art by Carlos Ezquerra) #560–572 (1988)
- "The No-Go Job" (art by Simon Harrison) #580–587 (1988)
- "The Final Solution" (part 1) (art by Simon Harrison) #600–606, 615–621, 636–641, 645–647 (1988–89)
- "The Final Solution" (part 2) (art by Colin MacNeil) #682–687 (1990)

(written by Wagner alone, art by Carlos and Hector Ezquerra):

- "Blood Moon" #2009, 1617–1628 (2008–09)
- "The Life and Death of Johnny Alpha" #1689–1699 (2010)
- "The Life and Death of Johnny Alpha: The Project" #2012, 1764–1771 (2011–12)

Middenface McNulty (by Alan Grant):

- "Wan Man an' His Dug" (with co-writer Tony Luke and artist John McCrea, in Judge Dredd Megazine #1.15-1.20, 1991–1992)
- "Grannibal!" (with pencils by Patrick Goddard and inks Dylan Teague, in Judge Dredd Megazine #3.76, 2001)

Young Middenface:

- "Tambo Shanter" (with pencils by Patrick Goddard, inks Dylan Teague and colours by Richard Elson, in Judge Dredd Megazine #4.11, 2002)
- "A Parcel of Rogues" (with pencils by Patrick Goddard and inks Dylan Teague, in Judge Dredd Megazine #4.16-4.18, 2002)
- "Mutopia" (with John Ridgway, in Judge Dredd Megazine #205-207, 2003)
- "Brigadoom!" (with pencils by Patrick Goddard and inks Dylan Teague, in Judge Dredd Megazine #218-220, 2004)
- "Killoden" (with John Ridgway, in Judge Dredd Megazine #224-229, 2004–2005)
- "Midnapped!" (with Shaun Thomas, in Judge Dredd Megazine #234-236, 2005)
- "A Scottish Sojer" (with Shaun Thomas, in Judge Dredd Megazine #240-243, 2006)

== Name ==
A midden is a waste pit. The term is still used in Scotland and has come by extension, to refer to anything that is a mess, including people. This reflects McNulty's rather knobbly and unattractive face.
