= Stewart McKenny =

Australian comic book artist

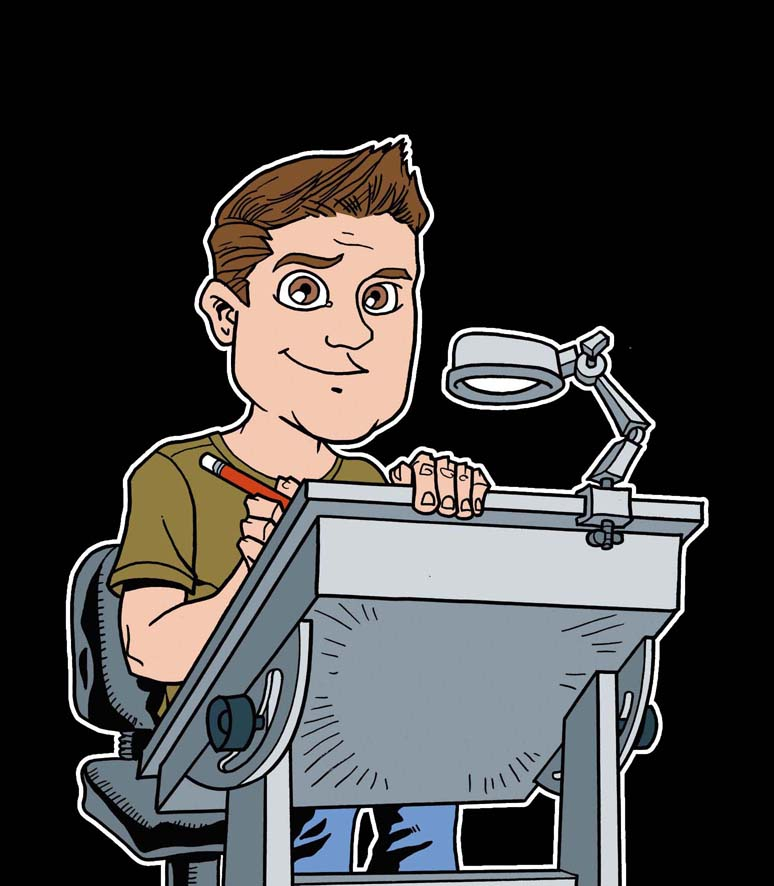
- Stewart McKenny self-portrait
- Area: Artist
- Notable works: Clone Wars Adventures; Super Friends

Stewart McKenny is an Australian comic book artist, who has been described as "one of Australia's most prolifically published comic book artists".

== Career ==
McKenny has worked on Star Wars comics, including Star Wars: Clone Wars Adventures, as well as working with Eddie Campbell on Captain America. He is currently working for DC on the new children's title, Super Friends.

McKenny’s British small press work includes contributions to FutureQuake. His cover for FutureQuake #6 was featured in a full-page reprint in the Judge Dredd Megazine (Feb 2006). In Australia, he has contributed to Zero Assassin, Tango Quattro, Pop Culture & Two Minute Noodles, Rex Hellwig and The Watch.

== Bibliography ==
Comics work includes:

- Rex Hellwig #1 (Black Cat Comics, 2000)
- The Watch vol. 2 #5 (Phosphorescent Comics, 2002)
- "Being Boba Fett" (with Jason Hall, in Star Wars Tales 18, 2003)
- Captain America vol. 4 #27-28 "Requiem" (inks, with writer Robert Morales and pencils by Eddie Campbell, Marvel Comics, 2004)
- The Watch: Casus Belli (Phosphorescent Comics, 2005)
- "Strip!" (with James MacKay, in FutureQuake #4, May 2005)
- "Triumph of the Will" (with writers Edward Berridge/Richmond Clements and graytones by Andy Finlayson, FutureQuake #6, May 2007)
- Super Friends #3, 5, 8, 12, 17, 21, 23, 26 and 29 (with writer Sholly Fisch and inks by Phillip Moy / Dan Davis, DC Comics, 2008–2010)
- The All-New Batman: The Brave and the Bold #15 (DC Comics, 2012)
