= Durham Red =

- Illustration by Carlos Ezquerra from 2000 AD No. 561 (1988)

Publication information
- Publisher: IPC Magazines / Rebellion Developments
- First appearance: 2000 AD #505 (17 January 1987)
- Created by: John Wagner; Alan Grant; Carlos Ezquerra

In-story information
- Full name: Durham Red
- Species: Human mutant
- Place of origin: Earth
- Team affiliations: Strontium Dogs
- Notable aliases: Empress Redwina; Saint Scarlet; Brite Red
- Abilities: Super-strength; Super agility Bloodlust; Regenerative powers Long lifespan Superhuman senses

Durham Red is a British comics character, originally created in 1987 as a female sidekick and lover for Johnny Alpha in the long-running comic book series Strontium Dog in 2000 AD. She is a bounty hunter with a mutation that gives her a vampiric lust for blood.

== Publication history ==
When the character was first devised, there was some debate over Durham Red or Chelsea Blue as the character's name. The writers, John Wagner and Alan Grant, settled on Durham Red, and the character immediately proved popular from her first appearance. Following the death of Johnny Alpha, she was given a leading role in the spin-off series Strontium Dogs and in her own series, Durham Red. Following the departure of writer Peter Hogan, the series was handed to Dan Abnett. Abnett's first action was to place Red in suspended animation and have her awake a thousand years after Strontium Dog continuity, in a universe where she was worshipped as a mythical saint of mutants.

With art by several artists including Mark Harrison, the series has enjoyed a long run. Dan Abnett's final story was printed in 2004, envisioning Durham Red surviving another ten thousand years, watching over the end of the human race and the beginning of a mutant-populated universe. Since then, the character has returned in stories set before Abnett's, in which she is still in the 22nd century.

== Fictional character biography ==
As a result of radioactive fallout (strontium-90) from a nuclear war in 2150, Durham Red was born with a mutation which made her resemble a vampire in appearance and behaviour, although she had no supernatural attributes. Shunned by other mutants, she joined the Search / Destroy agency at a young age and became a bounty hunter, or "strontium dog." While working for the agency she met Johnny Alpha (the lead character in the Strontium Dog series) and they were briefly romantically involved, but he was unable to trust her (and with good reason).

At some unspecified time after Alpha's death, Red became tired of her life and entered suspended animation. She only intended to do this for a couple of years, but she was not awoken until 1,272 years later. On her revival she discovered that the human race had spread throughout the galaxy but was still divided between pure-blood humans and mutants. As a mutant who drank the blood of normal humans, she had become a mythical figure to the mutants, who revered her as a saint ("Saint Scarlet"). Her efforts to end the conflict backfired and only made things much worse, costing the lives of billions. However she lived for another ten thousand years, and eventually witnessed a renaissance of human civilisation. In the last episode of Dan Abnett's stories, it is implied that she became an empress and was responsible for a new golden age of humanity, before faking her death and withdrawing from public life. Stories published since then (2004) are set before she entered suspended animation.

== Bibliography ==
She has appeared in a number of strips and featured in her own Durham Red title:

- Strontium Dog:
  - "Bitch" (by Alan Grant and Carlos Ezquerra, in 2000 AD #505–529, 1987)
  - "The Stone Killers" (by Alan Grant and Carlos Ezquerra, in 2000 AD #560–572, 1988)
  - "The Final Solution" (one episode only) (by Alan Grant and Colin MacNeil, in 2000 AD #682, 1990)
- Durham Red:
  - "Island of the Damned" (by Alan Grant and Carlos Ezquerra, in 2000 AD #762–773, 1991)
  - "The Golden Mile" (by Alan Grant and Carlos Ezquerra, in 2000AD Yearbook 1993)
  - "Mirrors" (by Peter Hogan and Mark Harrison, in 2000 AD #901–903, 1994)
  - "Ghosts" (by Peter Hogan and Mark Harrison, in 2000 AD Winter Special, 1994)
- Strontium Dogs: "High Moon" (Peter Hogan and Mark Harrison, 2000 AD #940–947, 1995)
- Durham Red:
  - "Bloodlines" (text story by Peter Hogan, with illustrations by Mark Harrison, in 2000 AD Alternity Winter Special, 1995)
  - "Deals" (by Peter Hogan and Mark Harrison, in 2000 AD #960–963, 1995)
  - "Diners" (by Peter Hogan and Paul Marshall, in 2000 AD Sci-Fi Special 1995)
  - "Night of the Hunters" (by Peter Hogan and Mark Harrison, in 2000 AD #1000–1005, 1996)
  - "Epicedium" (by Dan Abnett and Mark Harrison, in 2000 AD #1006, 1996)
  - "The Scarlet Cantos" (by Dan Abnett and Mark Harrison, in 2000 AD #1078–1083 and #1085–1089, 1998)
  - "Mask of the Red Death" (by Dan Abnett and Mark Harrison, in 2000 AD #1111, 1998)
  - "The Vermin Stars" (by Dan Abnett and Mark Harrison, in 2000 AD #1250–1261, 2001)
- The Scarlet Apocrypha:
  - "Necrocultura" (by Dan Abnett and John Burns, in Judge Dredd Megazine vol. 4 No. 12, 2002)
  - "Semblance" (by Dan Abnett and Steve Yeowell, in Judge Dredd Megazine vol. 4 No. 13, 2002)
  - "The Spirit and the Gaki" (by Dan Abnett and Frazer Irving, in Judge Dredd Megazine vol. 4 No. 14, 2002)
  - "Children of the Night" (by Dan Abnett and Enric Romero, in Judge Dredd Megazine vol. 4 No. 15, 2002)
  - "Genegun SD" (Dan Abnett and Steve Kyte, in Judge Dredd Megazine vol. 4 No. 16, 2002)
  - "Red Menace" (Dan Abnett and Carlos Ezquerra, in Judge Dredd Megazine vol. 4 No. 17, 2002)
  - "In the Flesh" (Dan Abnett and Mark Harrison, in Judge Dredd Megazine vol. 4 No. 18, 2002)
- Durham Red:
  - "The Empty Suns Book I" (by Dan Abnett and Mark Harrison, in 2000 AD #1362–1368, 2003)
  - "The Empty Suns Book II" (by Dan Abnett and Mark Harrison, in 2000 AD #1382–1386, 2004)
  - "The 'Nobody Wants This Job' Job" (by Alan Grant and Carlos Ezquerra, in 2000 AD #1785–1790, 2012)
  - "Running Out of Patients" (written by Leah Moore and John Reppion, art by Jan Duursema and Dylan Teague, in 2000 AD Free Comic Book Day Prog 2014)
  - "The Calling" (written by Robert Murphy, art by Duane Redhead and Kirsty Swan, in 2000 AD Sci-Fi Special 2014)
  - "The Judas Strain" (written by Lauren Beukes and Dale Halvorsen, art by Carlos Ezquerra, in 2000 AD 40th Anniversary Special, 2017)
  - "Born Bad" (written by Alec Worley, art by Ben Willsher (episodes 1–4) and Lee Carter (episodes 5–8), in 2000 AD #2082–2089, 2018)
  - "Three Gifts" (written by Alec Worley, art by Ben Willsher, in 2000 AD #2111, 2018)
  - "Mistletoe Kiss" (written by Alec Worley, art by Ben Willsher, in 2000 AD #2162, 2019)
  - "Served Cold" (written by Alec Worley, art by Ben Willsher, in 2000 AD #2212–2219 and 2221–2223, 2021)
  - "Mad Dogs" (written by Alec Worley, art by Ben Willsher, in 2000 AD #2326–2335 and 2337–2338, 2023)

=== Collected editions ===
Some of the later stories have been collected into a number of trade paperbacks:

- The Scarlet Cantos (collects "The Scarlet Cantos" and "Mask of the Red Death", April 2006, ISBN 1-904265-86-3)
- Vermin Stars (collects "Vermin Stars", April 2006, ISBN 1-904265-08-1)
- Empty Suns (collects Durham Red: "The Empty Suns Book I" and "The Empty Suns Book II", November 2007, ISBN 1-905437-45-5)

== Other media ==
Peter J. Evans has written a number of Durham Red novels that have been published by Black Flame:

- The Unquiet Grave (August 2004 ISBN 1-84416-159-5)
- The Omega Solution (May 2005 ISBN 1-84416-175-7)
- The Encoded Heart (October 2005 ISBN 1-84416-272-9)
- Manticore Reborn (January 2006 ISBN 1-84416-323-7)
- Black Dawn (July 2006 ISBN 1-84416-382-2)

== Similarity with BloodRayne ==
Critics said that Rayne, from the videogame series BloodRayne shows a strong similarity to Durham Red, having the same weapons and distinctive red hair. The claim has been denied by the TRI representatives. In a posting on the BloodRayne.co.uk forums Joe Wampole, a developer for BloodRayne declared:

Durham Red looks like a cool character but we've never heard of her. It is coincidence that her and BloodRayne look so similar.

The symbol on the hair is similar but looks more like a target, while Rayne's looks a little like Prince's symbol. Also, it looks like Durham is set in some alternate super sci-fi future.

I think it is just natural to put a vamp chick in black leather and either color her hair black or red."
