= Paul Scott (comics) =

- Area: Writer
- Pseudonyms: Paul von Scott; Cosmic Ray
- Notable works: Solar Wind; Omnivistascope
- Awards: "Best British Independent Comic" National Comics Award

Paul Scott, sometimes known as Paul von Scott, is a British comics writer and games designer who is very active in the British small press comics scene.

== Biography ==
Paul attended the University of Birmingham, where he studied geology.

He produces Solar Wind as well Big War Comic, Sunny For Girls, Omnivistascope and Warlock Holmes. In addition he has written for various other small press publications including FutureQuake, Something Wicked, The End Is Nigh and Starscape. He now runs a games company, Midlam Miniatures.

== Awards ==
- 2004: Won "Best British Independent Comic" National Comics Award for Solar Wind.
- 2006: Nominated for "Best British Black and White Comic" Eagle Award for Solar Wind
