= Peter Hogan =

British comics creator

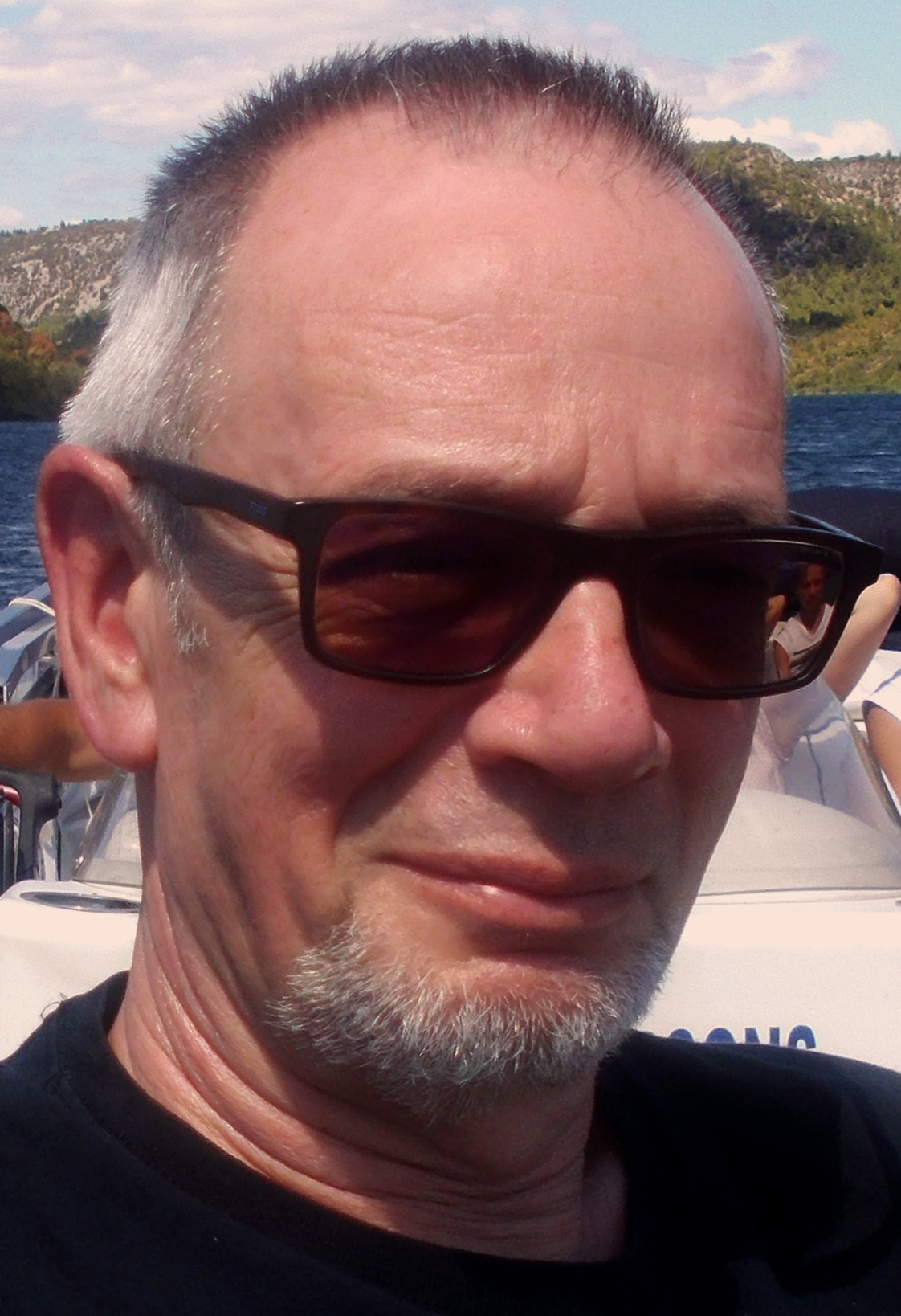
- Born: Peter K. Hogan
- Areas: Writer, Editor
- Notable works: Terra Obscura; Resident Alien (comics)

Recorded with Peter Hogan at Stoke Newington Literary Festival 2013.

Peter K. Hogan is an English writer and comics writer, best known for Resident Alien, which he co-created with artist Steve Parkhouse. Hogan began his comics career as editor of cult British comic magazine Revolver in 1990–1991, before working for 2000 AD, American comic book publishers Vertigo, America's Best Comics and Dark Horse Comics

== Biography ==
In 1978, Pete Townshend of rock band The Who asked Hogan to set up and manage his Magic Bus Bookshop in Richmond. Hogan then worked as commissioning editor for Townshend's Eel Pie Publishing from the late 1970s to the early 1980s. Projects included Pennie Smith's book of Clash photos, Viv Stanshall's Sir Henry At Rawlinson End, Roy Carr and Charles Shaar Murray's Bowie – An Illustrated Record. Hogan worked on the editorial side, with John Brown (later the publisher of Viz comic) on the business side. His known associates at that time were rock music journalists Dave Marsh and Patrick Humphries.

Hogan worked as a record company press officer for Rough Trade during the early days of The Smiths, and for IRS Records where he worked for R.E.M., as well as writing about music and film, for magazines like Melody Maker and Sky and Vox, and much later on Uncut. He went on to write books about The Bangles, The Doors, Queen, R.E.M., The Velvet Underground and Nick Drake.

He also was a contributing writer to a biography about The Monkees pop group.

Hogan is the brother-in-law of noted UK comic artist/typographer/design guru Rian Hughes.

Fleetway then hired Hogan to edit comics, and whilst he was editing Revolver, he also co-edited The Comic Relief Comic with Neil Gaiman and Richard Curtis.

Later, Hogan became a scriptwriter for the 2000 AD comic, working on short story series Vector 13 and Tharg's Dragon Tales, as well as reinventing the long-running Strontium Dog series as Strontium Dogs and supervising the Durham Red spin-off series. Hogan also had a short stint working on Sam Slade, Robo-Hunter. He also created the fantasy Timehouse.

However, when David Bishop took on the editorship of 2000 AD, he informed Hogan that he would commission no more of Hogan's scripts because he "didn't believe his writing fitted the comic [he] wanted 2000 AD to be." The two commissioned scripts, Strontium Dogs "Hate and War" and Durham Red "Night of the Hunters", were heavily rewritten and Hogan asked for his name to be removed – they were credited to Alan Smithee. With hindsight, Bishop says: "He was rightly furious about having his work summarily rewritten and demanded his name taken off the scripts, which I did. I regret the brutal way I treated Peter: I was in a hurry to make changes and he caught the full force of that haste."

In the 1990s, Hogan wrote for some titles on DC Comics' Vertigo imprint, including The Dreaming and The Sandman Presents: Love Street. Most recently, his unpublished followup to the latter, The Sandman Presents: Marquee Moon, was published online. Like Love Street, Marquee Moon is a tie-in to Neil Gaiman's The Sandman and offers a look at the early days of John Constantine of Swamp Thing and Hellblazer fame.

In addition, Hogan has worked with Alan Moore on Moore's America's Best Comics series, including his own spin-off title Terra Obscura. He also wrote three issues of Tom Strong with artist Chris Sprouse and the two of them returned to the character in 2010 with the limited series Tom Strong and the Robots of Doom.

Since 2011, Hogan has worked on his own Resident Alien series for Dark Horse. It has been adapted by Chris Sheridan into a television series starring Alan Tudyk in the title role.

In 2020, Hogan returned to the pages of 2000 AD working with Brendan McCarthy on Zaucer of Zilk: A Zaucer Full of Zecrets.

== Bibliography ==
Comics work includes:

- Tharg's Dragon Tales:
  - "The Challenge" (with Tim Bollard, in 2000 AD #793–95, 1992)
  - "Dragon Tales" (with Nigel Dobbyn, in 2000 AD #793-–95, 1992)
- Tharg's Future Shocks:
  - "Seeds" (with Lee Sullivan, in 2000 AD No. 798, 1992)
  - "A Kind of Hush" (with Jon Haward, in 2000 AD No. 862, 1993)
  - "Time of Peace" (with DHill, in 2000 AD No. 864, 1993)
  - "Clone Wolf" (with DHill, in 2000 AD No. 866, 1993)
  - "Brighter Later" (with Jon Haward, in 2000 AD Winter Special 1993)
  - "Red Giant" (with Paul Johnson, in 2000 AD No. 892, 1994)
  - "The Star!" (with Mike Perkins, in 2000 AD No. 938, 1995)
  - "The Way We Whirr!" (with Tim Perkins, in 2000 AD Sci-Fi Special 1995)
- Strontium Dogs:
  - "Crossroads" (with Nigel Dobbyn, in 2000 AD #897–899, 1994)
  - "Alphabet Man" (with Nigel Dobbyn, in 2000 AD #937–939, 1995)
  - "High Moon"(with Mark Harrison, in 2000 AD #940–947, 1995)
  - "The Mutant Sleeps Tonight" (with Simon Harrison, in 2000 AD No. 957, 1995)
  - "Hate & War" (as Alan Smithee, with Trevor Hairsine, in 2000 AD #993–999, 1996)
- Robo-Hunter:
  - "Slade Runner" (with Rian Hughes, in 2000 AD 1994 Yearbook, 1993)
  - "Winnegan's Fake" (with Rian Hughes, in 2000 AD #852–854, 1993)
  - "Metrobolis" (with Rian Hughes, in 2000 AD #904–911, 1994)
  - "Fax and Deductions" (with Simon Jacob, in 2000 AD 1994 Sci-Fi Special)
  - "War of the Noses" (with Rian Hughes, in 2000 AD #1023, 1996)
  - Timehouse (with Tim Bollard):
  - "Timehouse" (in 2000 AD #860–866, 1993)
  - "Century Duty" (in 2000 AD #919–927, 1994–1995)
- Durham Red:
  - "Mirrors" (with Mark Harrison, in 2000 AD #901–903, 1994)
  - "Ghosts" (with Mark Harrison, in 2000 AD Winter Special 1994)
  - "Deals" (with Mark Harrison, in 2000 AD #960–963, 1995)
  - "Diners" (with Paul Marshall, in 2000 AD Sci-Fi Special 1995)
  - "Night of the Hunters" (as Alan Smithee, with Mark Harrison, in 2000 AD #1000–1005, 1996)
- Vector 13:
  - "Case Seven: Are They Cats?" (with John Ridgway, in 2000 AD No. 957, 1995)
  - "Case Nine: Spear of Destiny" (with David Hine, in 2000 AD No. 959, 1995)
  - "Case Four: Operation Mordred" (with Lee Sullivan, in 2000 AD #968, 1995
- The Sandman Presents: Marquee Moon (1997, unpublished)
- The Sandman Presents: Love Street (with pencils by Michael Zulli, 3-issue mini-series, Vertigo, July–September 1999)
- Terra Obscura (with co-author Alan Moore and pencils by Yanick Paquette, America's Best Comics):
  - Terra Obscura vol. 1 (6-issue limited series, August 2003 – February 2004)
  - Terra Obscura vol. 2 (6-issue limited series, January 2004 – May 2005)
- Tom Strong #24–25, 35 (with pencils by Chris Sprouse, America's Best Comics, January–March 2004, January 2006)
- Tom Strong and the Robots of Doom (with Chris Sprouse, 6-issue limited series, America's Best Comics, June 2010–January 2011)
- Tom Strong and the Planet of Peril (with Chris Sprouse, 6-issue limited series, Vertigo, September 2013–February 2014)
- Resident Alien (with Steve Parkhouse, Dark Horse Comics, April 2012–Present)
