= Adrian Bamforth =

British comic book artist

- Area: Artist

Adrian Bamforth is a British comic book artist who has worked for 2000 AD as well as producing work for British small press comics like FutureQuake.

== Bibliography ==
Comics work includes:

- Judge Dredd:
  - "Pret-a-porker" (in Zarjaz volume 1 #1, 2001)
  - "Married with juves" (with Gordon Rennie, in 2000 AD #1262, 2001)
- Judge Anderson: "Not All in the Mind" (with Alan Grant, in Zarjaz volume 1 #2, 2002)
- Sinister Dexter:
  - "U R Here" (with Dan Abnett, in 2000 AD #1279, 2002)
  - "Narked for Death" (with Dan Abnett, in 2000 AD #1281, 2002)
- Past Imprefect: "The Red Menace" (with Gordon Rennie and inks: Lee Townsend, in 2000 AD #1318, 2002)
- "Emigration" (with Arthur Wyatt, in FutureQuake #1, 2003)
- "Down The Tubes" (with Arthur Wyatt, in FutureQuake #2, 2004)
- "Outer Space" (with Arthur Wyatt, in FutureQuake #3, 2004)
- "The Other side" (art and script, in Something Wicked #1, 2006)
- Tharg's Future Shocks: "Optimal" (with Al Ewing, in 2000 AD #1496, 2006)
- Tharg's Future Shorts: "Stasis" (art and script, in 2000 AD #1510, 2006)
