= P. J. Holden =

Irish comic artist

- Born: Paul Jason Holden; 28 December 1969 (age 56) Northern Ireland
- Area: Artist
- Notable works: The 86ers Judge Dredd

Paul Jason Holden (born 28 December 1969) is a Northern Irish comic artist based in Belfast.

He has worked for 2000 AD, Warhammer Monthly, and Judge Dredd Megazine. Among other stories for these publications, he has provided the art for Rogue Trooper, Judge Dredd and Johnny Woo.

== Biography ==
Holden was first published by Fantagraphics in 1997 (Holy Cross #3) with Malachy Coney, and he provided art for a story with Mike Carey from Caliber in 1997.

Not professionally published again until 2000 AD (Judge Dredd "Sino-Cit") in 2001, he has been working professionally since. This work has included further stints on Judge Dredd and, most recently, becoming the main artist on The 86ers, taking over for the third instalment of the first story.

He has a long history within the British small press comics, amongst other things, providing the early covers for FutureQuake, and this has continued until today with his providing forums to small press publishers on his Pencil Monkey message board. He has recently collected all his small press work into a single volume, Previously.

Holden got his break into the American comic book market with the Image Comics, mini-series Fearless.

Holden has also formed Infurious Comics a company aiming to produce mobile comics for the iPhone and iPod Touch and he helped design the Comic Reader App to facilitate this, which the BBC highlighted as one of "four pioneering web innovations". He has also provided the art for their first comic Murderdrome, written by Al Ewing. Although this was banned by Apple for violent content, the publicity raised the profile of Comic Reader App, which resulted in NBC licensing it for their Heroes comics. This led the BBC to suggest "Mr Holden and his colleagues may have accidentally hit upon what could be the future of comic book publishing.

== Bibliography ==
=== Comics ===
Comics work includes:

- Fantagraphics (with Malachy Coney):
  - Holy Cross #3
  - The Moon Looked Down and Laughed with
  - The DandyLion
- "Suicide Kings" (with Mike Carey, Caliber Comics, 1997)
- Mega-City One: "The Burning Red" (with Simon Spurrier, in Zarjaz (vol. 1) #1, 2001)
- Judge Dredd:
  - "Sino-Town" (with Gordon Rennie, in 2000 AD #1233, 2001)
  - "Unnatural Selection" (with Alan Grant, in 2000 AD #1278, 2002)
  - "Waiting" (with Gordon Rennie, in 2000 AD #1312, 2002)
  - "Meet the Flooks" (with Gordon Rennie, in 2000 AD #1359, 2003)
  - "Dead Man Walking" (with Jonathan Clements, in Judge Dredd Megazine #226, 2004)
  - "The Magnificent Umbersons" (with Gordon Rennie, in Judge Dredd Megazine #235, 2005)
  - "Warzone" (with John Wagner, in Judge Dredd Megazine #240-243, 2006)
  - "House of Pain" (with Gordon Rennie, in 2000 AD #1488-1490, 2006)
  - "Sanctuary" (with Gordon Rennie, in 2000 AD #1495, 2006)
  - "On Campus" (with John Wagner, in 2000 AD #1522, 2007)
  - "It Came From Bea Arthur Block" (with Gordon Rennie, in 2000 AD #1637-1639, 2009)
  - "Tour of Duty: Interlude" (with John Wagner, in 2000 AD #1656, 2009)
- Tharg's Future Shocks:
  - "Alpha Team" (with Simon Spurrier, in 2000 AD #1262, 2001)
  - "Skeleton Key" (with Richard McTighe, in 2000 AD #1276, 2002)
  - "Autocrats Anonymous" (with Jaspre Bark, in 2000 AD #1370, 2003)
- Rogue Trooper: "Realpolitik" (with Gordon Rennie, in 2000 AD #1380-1385, 2004)
- "The Cut Above" (in FutureQuake #2, 2004)
- Johnny Woo: "A Bullet In The Head" (with Gordon Rennie, in Judge Dredd Megazine #231-233, 2005)
- Origins of the Cadre #2 (with Mat Nastos and Andrew Pellerito, Nifty Comics, 2005)
- The 86ers:
  - "Touchdown" (with writer Gordon Rennie, in 2000 AD #1482-1485, 2006)
  - "Interference" (with writer Gordon Rennie, in 2000 AD #1508-1510, 2006)
  - "Walking to Eternity" (with writer Gordon Rennie, in 2000 AD prog 2007, 2006)
  - "Grendel" (with writer Gordon Rennie, in 2000 AD #1544-1549, 2007)
  - "Under Pressure" (with writer Arthur Wyatt, in 2000 AD #1625-1630, 2009)
- Fearless (with Mark Sable and Dave Roth, Image Comics, 2007-2008)
- Dead Signal (with Al Ewing, in 2000 AD #1581-1587, 2008)
- Murderdrome (with Al Ewing, mobile comic, 2008)
- Battlefields: Happy Valley (with Garth Ennis, Dynamite Entertainment, January–February 2010, tpb, 88 pages, June 2010, ISBN 1-60690-128-1, included in The Complete Battlefields, Volume 2, hardcover, 200 pages, July 2011, ISBN 1-60690-222-9)
- Terminator/Robocop: Kill Human (with Rob Williams, 5-issue limited series, Dynamite Entertainment, July–November 2011, tpb, 104 pages, March 2012, ISBN 1-60690-260-1)

=== Covers ===
Covers work includes:

- FutureQuake #1-3, (2003–2004)

=== VR ===
VR work includes:

- Dragon Slumber
