= David Baillie (comics) =

Scottish comics writer

- Area: Writer
- Notable works: 2000 AD, Red Thorn for Vertigo

David Baillie is a writer and artist best known for creating the Vertigo comic series Red Thorn, and for writing stories for 2000 AD and Judge Dredd Megazine - for which he also once wrote a monthly column describing his life as a comics creator.

== Biography ==
David Baillie was born in East Whitburn, West Lothian in 1977. At university he studied electrical engineering, moved to London in 1999 and worked there for two years as a computer programmer in an investment bank before quitting that job to become an artist.

Baillie began his career as a self-publisher at the turn of the millennium, writing, drawing and hand-selling his own mini-comics at conventions, and wrote columns for the Judge Dredd Megazine about the experience. He wrote numerous Teenage Mutant Ninja Turtles comics for publishers in the UK and Europe, including Titan Magazines, both before and after Nickelodeon's acquisition of the franchise, which brought changes to its brand guidelines, including restrictions on the Turtles' consumption of pizza, and worked as a storyboard artist on children's television programmes including Teletubbies and In the Night Garden. His first credit in 2000 AD was the Future Shock "The Lie" (drawn by Nick Dyer) in Prog 1611, on sale 5 November 2008.

In 2010 Baillie was engaged as artist-in-residence for visual arts centre Firstsite in Colchester.

In 2011 he took part in the successful group effort to break the Guinness World Records for the fastest comic-book ever produced and the largest number of creators working on a single comic, with proceeds going to Yorkhill Hospital.

In 2013 he was one of a number of professional writers commissioned to write a novel for Amazon Publishing's Kindle Worlds line featuring the Valiant Comics character Bloodshot

In 2014 he was interviewed in Judge Dredd Megazine issue 344 by Matthew Badham about his comics career to date.

It was announced at the 2015 San Diego Comic-Con that Baillie would write a new series for Vertigo called Red Thorn, set in modern-day Glasgow exploring Scottish mythology, featuring art by Meghan Hetrick, colours by Steve Oliff, (latterly Nick Filardi) and letters by Todd Klein.

The first issue went on sale on 18 November 2015. The series ran for 13 issues, ending in December 2016. It was reported that the comic was being developed for television as a six-episode hour-long series for BBC Scotland by production company Wall to Wall, with Emilia di Girolamo having written a pilot episode and story bible.

In 2017 Baillie appeared at the Edinburgh International Book Festival with Rob Davis to discuss Comics of a Deadly Kind and the inspiration and publication history of his series Red Thorn.

At the beginning of 2018 it was announced that Baillie would write the return of classic Judge Dredd character Chopper with Mad Max's Brendan McCarthy on art.

In 2018 Baillie was interviewed for the Scotland's Futures Forum film Our Future Scotland, along with Scottish writers, artists, politicians and actors, including Brian Cox, Nicola Sturgeon and Christopher Brookmyre.

In 2019 Baillie's Chopper stories were collected by Rebellion and he wrote a graphic novel celebrating the thrash metal band Megadeth's greatest hits international tour.

In 2020 Baillie revisited the history of classic 2000AD character The Gronk, produced several Judge Dredd tales with new Scottish artist Anna Morozova and contributed a number of short stories to Rebellion's Judge Dredd Prose collection, Judge Fear's Big Day Out and Other Stories. In May he and Conor Boyle created a story called “Revenge of the Cicatrix” for Heavy Metal Magazine. He also wrote and drew a short web series of unconnected comic stories for Webtoon called Paraverse.

In 2021 Baillie wrote "Strontium Dug" (with artist Colin MacNeil) for 2000 AD, and a second Chopper story, "Dreamgazer", with artist Tom Foster for the 2000 AD Sci-Fi Special. A Middenface McNulty story with artist VV Glass followed in the 2022 Sci-Fi Special. In 2024 Baillie's series "Harrower Squad", with artist Steve Yeowell, debuted in the Judge Dredd Megazine in issue 464, alongside the three-part 2000 AD story "Blue Skies Over Deadwick" (with Nick Brokenshire).

In 2025, Baillie wrote "Jump", a Bloodshot story illustrated by João Azeitona, for Black, White & Bloodshot #3, published by Alien Books.

== Selected bibliography ==
=== Vertigo / DC Comics ===
- Red Thorn, co-created with artist Meghan Hetrick, letters by Todd Klein (13 issues, 2015–2016)

=== 2000 AD ===
- "The Ghostship Mathematica" with art by Inaki Miranda/Eva de la Cruz, (Progs 1827 to 1829)
- "After the Vengeance" with art by Jon Davis-Hunt, (Progs 1870 to 1873)
- "The Flowers of Viber Hinge" with art by Paul Marshall, Prog 1873
- "A Guide for Prisoners Arriving from the Year 2149" with art by Warren Pleece, (Prog 1786)
- "Silent Running", with art by Anthony Williams (comics), (Prog 1787)
- "Birth of the Mazzikim", with art by Jesus Redondo, (Prog 1737)
- "The Death Magnetic", with art by Will Morris, (Prog 1836)
- "Time is the Only Enemy, art by Graeme Neil Reid and Letters by Simon Bowland, (Prog 1837)
- "The Crow Gifts", art by Joshua George, Letters by Ellie De Ville, (Prog 1958)
- "The Lie" (Future Shock), with art by Nick Dyer, Prog 1611
- "The Trouble With Gronks", with art by Rob Davis, Prog 2020
- "Viva Forever", with art by Anna Morozova, Prog 2020
- "Strontium Dug", with art by Colin MacNeil, Prog 2256
- "Blue Skies Over Deadwick", with art by Nick Brokenshire, Progs 2383–2385

=== Judge Dredd Megazine ===
- "The Unfortunate Case of High-Altitude Albert", with art by Joel Carpenter, (Meg 317)
- "And Death Must Die", with art by Jake Lynch, (Meg 348)
- "Dead Man Talking", Judge Dredd prose story, (Meg 339)
- "Too Hottie To Handle", Judge Dredd prose story, (Meg 354)
- "Prophet of Stomm", Judge Dredd Black Museum art by Steve Austin, (Meg 357)
- Chopper: "Wandering Soul", with art by Brendan McCarthy, (Meg 395–399)
- Harrower Squad: "Calhab Country", with art by Steve Yeowell, Megs 464–467
- Harrower Squad: "Urban Rotation", with art by Steve Yeowell, Megs 468–471
