= Michael Molcher =

British journalist and magazine editor

Michael Molcher is a British journalist and magazine editor, who is originally from Leeds. His book I Am the Law: How Judge Dredd Predicted Our Future won an Eisner Award in 2024. He also produced the small press magazine The End Is Nigh.

His more recent work is as a freelance features writer for 2000 AD, the Judge Dredd Megazine and Comic Heroes, for which he has interviewed some of the most notable artists and writers from the British comic industry. He also wrote a piece for the 30th anniversary issue of 2000 AD. In recent times, his latter-day interviews are primarily conducted live by remote video, and are currently posted on the "2000AD YouTube channel" – via YouTube.

== Bibliography ==
=== Books ===
- I Am the Law: How Judge Dredd Predicted Our Future (Rebellion, 2024)

=== Feature writing ===
As well as a lot of uncredited writing in The End Is Nigh, his feature writing includes:

- "A Very English Apocalypse" (interview with Alan Moore, illustrated by Frazer Irving, in The End Is Nigh #2, 2005)
- 2000AD features:
  - "Tharg's Big Breaks" (Prog 1526) - 30th anniversary issue feature, looking at the many 2000AD readers who have gone on to be artists and writers for the comic
- Judge Dredd Megazine features:
  - Alan Moore (Meg 246)
  - Kevin O'Neill (Meg 248)
  - Mick McMahon (Meg 256)
  - Pat Mills (Meg 261)
  - Simon Spurrier (Meg 263)
  - John Hicklenton (Meg 264)
  - Simon Davis (Meg 265)
  - Dave Taylor (Meg 270)
  - Frazer Irving (Meg 272)
  - Peter Doherty (Meg 273)
  - Jock (Meg 274)
  - Greg Staples (Meg 279)
  - John Higgins (Meg 281)
  - Colin Wilson (Meg 284)
  - Richard Elson (Meg 285)
  - John Cooper (Meg 286)
  - Ron Smith (Megs 288 to 289)
  - Dom Reardon (Meg 295)
  - Jesus Redondo (Meg 296)
  - Dave Gibbons (Megs 297 to 298)
  - Carlos Ezquerra (Megs 300 to 302)
- Obituaries:
  - "Belardinelli - Loving the Alien" (Meg 259, 2007) - obituary of Massimo Bellardinelli
- Comic Heroes features:
  - Interview with Hellboy artist Guy Davis in issue one
  - Interview with Alan Moore in issue two
  - Interview with Sean Phillips in issue three
