= Mobile comic =

Type of digital comic

A mobile comic is a digital comic or cartoon strip that can be purchased, downloaded, read and sometimes edited or shared with friends via mobile phones.

== Overview ==
Increasingly the line between digital comics, animation and games is blurring and the same applies to their mobile counterparts as mobile comics become multimedia with sounds and interactivity. In 2008 IDW Publishing and Devil's Due Publishing (now Devil's Due Digital) became two of the earliest adopters of comics for mobile devices. Devil's Due's initially offered mobile comics through companies such as Uclick, on their GoComics Mobile Store.

Mobile comic content has until recently been miniaturized or adapted versions of established branded comic content. With the rise of file sharing and piracy it has been increasingly hard for publishers to control money leakage from digital/mobile comics and as such publishers (especially traditional Japanese Manga houses) have shied away from licensing digital or mobile comics.

This however, has led to the rise of user-generated (independent artists) using platforms to publish and sell their work at low cost, and (for the first time in years) do so profitably.

The challenges for mobile comics creation include:

- Small screen size, which means as little text as possible can be included.
- Different handsets with different screen sizes and technical specifications means the same java viewer will not work on all phones.
- Story telling must end within 25 frames, or less. The number of frames depends on delivery method

Several mobile content providers have now developed their own mobile comics platforms, some using java-based applications which have to be downloaded to the mobile first before comics can be viewed. Others are using Multi Media Messaging and WAP subscription to deliver strips. However, there are platforms for iPhone and iPad that have been developed to distribute RSS-based webcomics for free, such as the iOS application Comic Avenue.

== Titles ==
Initially the titles released were existing comics licensed for the new medium but new titles are emerging purely on the mobile phone. Thunder Road is the first original title for the medium, featuring artist Steven Sanders who previously worked on The Five Fists of Science. Carnival of Souls is the first digital and motion comic book series on Blackberry's App World, written by Jazan Wild. The Carrier is the first original graphic novel exclusively on the iPhone, written by Evan Young. Alien Revolution an eight chapter multi language comic, by Illot.Mobilecomic A collection of comics. Multi language. Interactive, by Illot.
