= Strontium Dog =

Comics series

Johnny Alpha
- Johnny Alpha; Art by Carlos Ezquerra.

Publication information
- Publisher: originally IPC Media (Fleetway) to 1999, thereafter Rebellion Developments
- First appearance: Starlord #1 (1978)
- Created by: John Wagner; Carlos Ezquerra

In-story information
- Alter ego: John Kreelman
- Team affiliations: Search/Destroy Agency
- Notable aliases: Johnny Alpha
- Abilities: Mutant eyes allow him to see through solid objects and read brainwave patterns, limited telekinesis, superb military skills, has mastered Yogi trick of stopping & restarting his own heartbeat

Strontium Dog is a long-running British comics series starring Johnny Alpha, a mutant bounty hunter who lives in Earth's future. The series was created in 1978 by writer John Wagner (under the pseudonym T. B. Grover) and artist Carlos Ezquerra for Starlord, a short-lived weekly science fiction comic. When Starlord was cancelled, the series transferred to the British science fiction weekly 2000 AD. In 1980, Wagner was joined by co-writer Alan Grant, although scripts were normally credited to Grant alone. Grant wrote the series by himself from 1988 to 1990. Wagner revived the series after a ten-year hiatus in 2000. After Ezquerra's death in October 2018, the series was put in indefinite hiatus with no current plans for its continuation (other than some single-episode stories in special issues aimed at younger readers).

The series takes place in an imagined future after the Great Nuclear War of 2150. Due to nuclear fallout of strontium-90, humanity has an increased number of mutant births, most of whom have physical abnormalities but some of whom possess superhuman abilities. John Kreelman is born with white blank eyes and a mutant "alpha radiation" power that grants him greater perception, allowing telepathy and the ability to see through many surfaces. Facing discrimination, John Kreelman adopts the name "Johnny Alpha" and becomes a bounty hunter for the Search/Destroy Agency. Due to the origin of their mutation and their S/D badges, mutant bounty hunters are nicknamed "strontium dogs." A formidable bounty hunter, Johnny Alpha uses not only his mutant abilities in combat but also an array of high-tech gadgets and weapons.

Strontium Dog stories are often known for a bleak, minimalistic edge at times reminiscent of spaghetti westerns. Several stories veer into satire and overtly bizarre science fantasy. Johnny Alpha's adventures sometimes involve time travel (such as a mission to 1945 where he attempts to apprehend Adolf Hitler) or alternate dimensions (including one that seems to be Hell). On several occasions, Johnny Alpha's time travel adventures to periods before the Great Nuclear War have featured him crossing paths with another 2000 AD character Judge Dredd.

== Series background ==
In the world of Strontium Dog, the Great Nuclear War of 2150 wipes out 70% of Britain's population, leading to a huge increase of mutant births due to exposure to nuclear fallout (strontium-90). The mutants of Strontium Dog differ from the usual depiction of mutants in American comics, such as those published by Marvel, in that they are generally afflicted with obvious physical abnormalities. Only a rare few are born with superhuman powers. These strontium-influenced mutants face a high degree of prejudice from average humans ("norms"). Born in 2150 to Diana Kreelman and her husband Nelson Bunker Kreelman, the boy Johnny Kreelman has mutant eyes that can increase his perception by channeling "alpha radiation", allowing telepathy and telekinesis, as well as the ability to see through most surfaces. Nelson is a bigoted politician who gains popularity by drafting anti-mutant laws and creating the anti-mutant police force known as the Kreelers. Despised, abused, and hidden away by his father, Johnny escapes his parents at a young age and adopts the name Johnny Alpha. He then joins the rising resistance group known as the Mutant Army and quickly becomes a valued leader, despite still being a teenager.

The Mutant Uprising of 2167 fails to overthrow the government. Despite this, Johnny Alpha blackmails his father, leading to the man's resignation and the disbanding of the Kreelers (though many members simply transfer into the local police force). Members of the Mutant Army are pardoned for their actions only on condition that they leave Earth forever. An orbital space station is built and becomes the headquarters of the new Search/Destroy Agency, an organization that accepts contracts to hunt criminals and threats deemed too dangerous for conventional law enforcement and "norms." The former Mutant Army members become galactic bounty hunters for the S/D Agency. Due to their S/D badges and the origins of their mutations, these bounty hunters are nicknamed "strontium dogs" by Earth people. This also leads the S/D orbital base to be nicknamed the Doghouse.

On Earth, new laws protect mutants from being hunted and targeted for extermination. However, they still face great prejudice from society and are segregating into ghettos, such as a large mutant settlement at Milton Keynes. Additionally, mutants have limited working opportunities and cannot own businesses. Several mutants succumb to societal pressures and poverty, while others join the S/D Agency as new bounty hunters. By 2180, Johnny Alpha is one of the most famous strontium dogs.

=== Earth ===
Earth is rarely seen in the strip. When it is, the focus is often New Britain — Great Britain after a devastating nuclear war. It is much closer to modern-day Britain than Judge Dredd's Brit-Cit by the same writers, but it contains areas of nuclear devastation such as the Greater London Crater and Birmingham Gap; areas known to survive include Salisbury (now a major area and political centre), Glasgow, Newcastle, Dover, Christchurch & Bournemouth (now a combined conurbation), Cardiff, Isles of Scilly, and Winchester. The flying building of Upminster contains both the parliament and the monarchy. According to the sequel series Strontium Dogs, Britain has a large empire of outer-space colonies.

The mutants of New Britain live in ghettos, isolated from the human population and living in poverty. Stories like Traitor To His Kind reveal some figures in the government, such as the First Lord of the Military (himself having a mutant daughter), make attempts to slowly improve the mutants' situation, but much of this goes unnoticed by the public. Many other figures in the government prefer to regress toward greater oppression or even attempted extermination of the mutant population.

Ireland is known to still exist, though little has been shown; the US and Canada are both visited in The Mork Whisperer (2009); and the leader of a West African Mutant Republic is shown in The Final Solution. Antarctica is the setting of part of Outlaw, shown to have been turned into a tropical area with marshes and rainforests by the Rad Wars. The centre is Antarctic City (also the name of a megacity in Judge Dredd), with military and police matters handled by the Antarctic Militia.

In The Final Solution, the government is usurped by the New Church and the incumbent monarch killed. According to the first Strontium Dogs story, after the destruction of the New Church by the strontium dogs, a hastily assembled junta government exiled all mutants from Britain. Crossroads, in 2000 AD prog 898, reveals that Earth is a severe political mess, with 26 "minor wars", and the rest of the galaxy was cutting ties. The later strip The Life and Death of Johnny Alpha ignores all of this, instead having post-Church New Britain ruled by a more liberal government.

=== Dating ===
The first Strontium Dog stories in Starlord and 2000 AD were said to be set in the year 2180. During the Strontium Dog series published in 2000 AD, in-story events progressed were indicated as occurring in real time to publication. The story "Max Bubba" was published five years after the first Strontium Dog story and gave the date 2185 for its events. Similarly, the main Judge Dredd stories progress in parallel to the real time publication dates. Exceptions to this are some stories appearing in annual issues and summer specials that indicate they are revisiting earlier points of Johnny Alpha's life.

Despite this, there have been some dating discrepancies in the Strontium Dog series. The stories "The No-Go Job" and "The Final Solution" present a date of 2180 but are said to take place two years after the events in "Max Bubba." Likewise, the story "Judgement Day" gives the date 2178 even though it is set after the events in "Max Bubba."

== Johnny Alpha ==
John Alpha is the main character of Strontium Dog stories. His mutated eyes allow him to see through walls and read minds. Born in 2150, he is the son of Diana Kreelman and her husband Nelson Bunker Kreelman. Nelson is a politician who drafts the anti-mutant laws and gains power on the back of bigotry, creating the anti-mutant police force known as the Kreelers. Johnny leaves his parents at a young age and joins the Mutant Army, changing his surname from Kreelman to Alpha and deciding to keep his father's identity secret. Johnny becomes one of the Mutant Army's key leaders, playing a major part in the mutant uprising of 2167 when he is only 17.

By the time he joins the Search/Destroy agency, Johnny Alpha is a highly skilled and dangerous fighter, adept at combining his mutant powers with hand-to-hand combat and weaponry. A sarcastic, cynical man, he nonetheless believes that innocent life must be protected or avenged, even if against the odds. Deeply loyal to friends, he can be impatient and quick to anger if plans go wrong or situations continue to worsen, but often this motivates him to improvise new solutions rather than simply stew in anger. A dogged bounty hunter determined to earn reward for his work, Johnny is also guided by a moral conscience. He is persistent and pursues a target even if the job becomes difficult. However, he may relent for a good enough reason, such as if his target is a victim of greater evil. If he believes the cause is great enough, he may forego payment or decide not to accept it. In "The Doc Quince Case", learning new information convinces him to no longer pursue a man he has been hunting but instead to rescue and help him. In "The Slavers of Drule", Johnny tracks down a group of slavers simply because he believes it is the right thing to do. Despite his morality, Johnny is not above vengeance for himself or those he considers family. A device he used on his own father caused Nelson Kreelman to be locked in a time loop where he continuously relived his final moments, begging for his life.

During his career as a strontium Dog, Johnny Alpha becomes a formidable legend and a hero to some. He is responsible for achievements such as destroying the Wolrog homeworld, leading the mutant uprising on Earth, and bringing Adolf Hitler to the future to face trial. He is known for assisting mutants in trouble, such as when he donates a large sum of money to the Milton Keynes ghetto in "Mutie's Luck".

At times, Alpha has encountered another 2000 AD character, Judge Dredd, by journeying into the past via time travel, but it is ambiguous whether Johnny Alpha's future world is the fate of Dredd's timeline or one of several possibilities.

=== Weapons/equipment and mutant abilities ===
Like all Search/Destroy agents, Alpha is armed with highly advanced technology. His usual equipment includes a variable-cartridge blaster, electrified brass knuckles, a short-range teleporter, a "time drogue" that can briefly "rewind" the last few minutes of time in the immediate area, and "time bombs" which can transport somebody minutes or hours forwards or backwards in time (by which time the planet has moved in its orbit, causing the victim to reappear in empty space).

Johnny Alpha has white, incandescent eyes and multiple mutant abilities. Most frequently, high-level alpha radiation emitted from his eyes allows Johnny to see through walls and other solid objects, or to read people's minds. He has also used his piercing stare to inflict severe headaches on his opponents. He can also "suggest" illusions into their perceptions. Alpha has used this to save his life several times. In the stories "Judgement Day" and "Rage", Alpha makes Sabbat the Necromagus and Max Bubba respectively believe that people are behind them, distracting each long enough for Alpha to strike.

== Supporting cast ==
Wulf Sternhammer
Johnny's original partner. He is not a mutant but a normal human from Scandinavia. He became a strontium dog out of a sense of camaraderie with Johnny, and, despite the indignities, he viewed it as good work as it kept the galaxy "safe for decent people". A blunt and straightforward brawler, Wulf is far less prone to doubt and introspection and tries to bring his friend back in line when he has doubts. Since Starlord #5, Wulf wears the fur pelt of a Gronk that he'd befriended; the alien's custom was for people dear to them to wear their skin, so part of them would live on. Wulf acts a lot like a stereotypical Viking. Eventually, it was retconned that he was a Viking, accidentally brought into the 22nd century when Johnny was pursuing a criminal gang through time.

The Gronk
Early strips include the brother of the Gronk that Wulf had met earlier. It is a timid, metal-eating alien from the planet Blas, in the Gallego system (a tribute to the fantasy artist Blas Gallego). The Gronk provided medical back-up and constantly worried about its "poor heartses", and in "Outlaw" showed it could survive multiple heart attacks. A gag showed that "the Gronk" was the name for most of its species, causing problems when mail arrives for "the Gronk". In the Strontium Dogs spinoff, the Gronk transformed into a gun-toting highly aggressive soldier.

King Clarkie the Second
A thinly veiled parody of Prince Charles. He is the monarch for much of the strip, being deposed late in the series for his pro-mutant views. While presented as a buffoon in several strips, he was also essentially harmless and well-meaning.

Middenface McNulty
A mutant Scottish ally who was raised in a ghetto/concentration camp, 'Shytehill'. (Note: Presumably a reference to the Sighthill area of Glasgow) McNulty's head is covered with lumps. He later has a solo spin-off series.

Durham Red
A female mutant agent whose mutation resembles vampirism and who is thus feared and despised by other mutants. She also has a solo spin-off series.

Ruth
Johnny's "norm" sister. Her husband is Nigel; they have a daughter, Marci. Ruth and her family remain friendly to Johnny, even helping him blackmail Nelson during the Mutant Army uprising of 2167. During an early comic book adventure, Marci is abducted and almost killed by a criminal who seeks revenge on Johnny. After this, Ruth forbids him from coming near her family again, only making contact with him afterward when she deems it absolutely necessary.

Nelson Culliver
Half-brother to Johnny, a result of an extramarital affair by Nelson Kreelman. After the war, Culliver becomes head of the Anti-Mutant Squad at Scotland Yard. In "Traitor to His Kind", Culliver tries to have Alpha murdered, but he is exposed and dismissed. Alpha decides to assassinate him, but he changes his mind after meeting Culliver's children.

Feral
A young, savage mutant introduced in "The Final Solution". He initially despises the strontium dogs, who he saw as abandoning the mutants on Earth, but he is inspired by the actions of Johnny Alpha. Feral witnesses Alpha's sacrifice in "The Final Solution", and in the original strips of the 1990s, he becomes first a rebel outlaw in the colony worlds and then a renowned SD Agent. In "The Life and Death of Johnny Alpha", this was ignored and he becomes a strontium dog soon after "The Final Solution", but due to his abrasive personality, he soon left and becomes an outlaw who tries to resurrect Alpha, only to give up. In this second timeline, he is executed for murder on an alien world.

Stix Clan
In both the original series and the revival, Alpha frequently encounters or works alongside members of a mutant family. All members, male and female, are identical in appearance, personality and dress sense. They all hail from one town called Stixville on the colony of Freedonia and are highly hostile to outsiders. They often appear as antagonists to Alpha but at times they have work alongside him. However, they usually betray him at some point, showing only the slightest loyalty to other Stix. There is said to be only one good Stix, Father Phineas who is a Catholic priest, a genuinely good and kind person and thus unmentionable around the rest of the Clan.

Negus
Introduced in the revival, he is the First Lord of the Military, a stern-faced and middle-aged politician who both hires Johnny and acts as his Upminster contact. Negus pushes for increased mutant rights, having a mutant daughter that he kept at home (something Johnny remarked as being a brave act for a man in Negus' position), though he still wanted to keep mutant and norm bloodlines separate.

Precious Matson
A reporter from the mutant colony of Freedonia who appears in Flashbacks to the pre-Wulf days of Johnny's life. Competent and dogged, she befriends Johnny and helps him against the terrorist leader Blood Moon. In "Life and Death", she investigates the true events of Johnny's death. With McNulty's aid, she is able to resurrect him.

Kenton Sternhammer
Son of Wulf, he is introduced in "The Son" (2018). He becomes a member of the Search/Destroy Agency.

== Major stories ==
=== Original run ===
"Portrait of a Mutant", a flashback story in 1981, filled in the background of the series and Johnny's role in the Mutant Army; it introduced Kreelman and the Kreelers, his quasi-official anti-mutant police. Kreelman drafted laws stating mutants were not allowed to work or own businesses, leading to them being forced from their homes into slums and eventually into being forced into labour camps; the only option for many mutants was to join the nationwide guerilla Mutant Army. An attack was launched on Upminster in 2167 as part of a general uprising, but the Army's leaders were forced to surrender in the face of mass mutant executions. Kreelman used this as an opportunity to push forward the extermination of all mutants; Johnny Alpha and the other leaders escaped (thanks to Johnny's sister and mother) and led the Mutant Army in a second major uprising to prevent genocide. The Prime Minister and King agreed to draft into law a better deal for mutants, and - after hearing Alpha was Kreelman's son from Ruth - blackmailed Kreelman into resigning. The mutant leaders were pardoned on condition they go into exile in space, leading to the creation of the Search/Destroy agency; the Kreelers were disbanded and replaced with a new police force. This changeover was depicted by a panel showing Kreelers, which was then repeated but with a different uniform, showing that the same people and attitudes remained. In the present day, bookending "Portrait", Johnny tracked his father down and activated a time device, causing his father to relive his final moments: begging for his life, forever.

In the story "Outlaw", Kreelman was later freed, and, in disguise, had himself appointed head of the Search/Destroy agency. He used his position to frame Johnny and other Mutant Army veterans for murder. Johnny was soon made aware of the truth and had no qualms about dragging his own father before the deceived mutants who gunned him down on the spot.

In the 1986 story "Max Bubba", a lengthy story explaining Wulf's origins, Wulf was killed off at the hands of Max Bubba and his gang. This led to the epic "Rage", in which Johnny remorselessly hunted down his partner's killers. After that Johnny either worked solo, or with Durham Red or Scottish mutant Middenface McNulty.

Johnny was killed off in 1990, sacrificing himself to save mutants from extermination at the hands of Kreelman's illegitimate son, Lord Sagan. Artist Carlos Ezquerra disagreed with the decision to kill him and refused to draw it, so Johnny's final adventures were illustrated by Simon Harrison and Colin MacNeil. John Wagner later admitted in Judge Dredd Megazine's Thrill Power Overload feature on the history of the comic that "killing off Johnny Alpha was a mistake [that] I'm doing my best to rectify." He later described it as "one of the big regrets of my career, probably the biggest."

=== Post-death and Strontium Dogs ===
The medium of time travel allowed him to make further appearances. In the 1991 Judge Dredd Annual John Wagner wrote and Colin MacNeil drew "Top Dogs", in which Johnny and Wulf travel back in time to Mega-City One in pursuit of a criminal, whilst encountering and only narrowly escaping Judge Dredd. Johnny and Dredd renewed acquaintances in 1992 in the Judge Dredd story "Judgement Day", written by Garth Ennis and drawn mainly by Ezquerra.

The supporting cast would gain their own spin-off strip Strontium Dogs in the 1990s, written by Garth Ennis and Peter Hogan. It was criticised by Ennis in the book Thrill Power Overload as being anticlimactic and that the lead, Feral, "was nowhere near as interesting as Johnny". The series was scrapped when David Bishop became 2000 AD's editor. The first story, "Monster" starring Feral, revealed the Search Destroy Agency no longer existed and mutants had been driven off Earth by a hastily assembled UK junta government; colony worlds were also shown to be under military occupation and severely ill-treating mutants, with the alleged mutant resistance merely using their organisation to extort "liberation" taxes from mutants (an allegory for The Troubles in Northern Ireland, Ennis' home).

Ennis would bring back the Gronk in "Return of the Gronk", turning him into an aggressive berserker: learning that Johnny Alpha was dead caused a heart attack which awakened his aggressive side of this one. The Gronk and Feral were teamed up, and went out for revenge against the necromancers who had killed Alpha in "The Darkest Star". In the process, Feral found out he was the son of the lead necromancer and both he and the Gronk discovered that the necromancers drew their power from torturing the people they had killed – including Johnny Alpha. To destroy the enemy, the Gronk killed the captives – including, at his friend's request, Alpha himself, who couldn't live on in such excruciating pain.

From 2000 AD # 897, Peter Hogan became the regular writer on the strip and in prog 898 he resurrected the Search Destroy Agency: an agent named Bullmoose revealed that the Galactic Crime Commission had cut ties with Earth (who had pressed for the Agency to be closed and mutants purged), moved to Ganymede, and recreated the agency as they needed mutants to "clean their dirty laundry for them".

Durham Red was given her own solo series, written by Alan Grant, Peter Hogan and later Dan Abnett. This series continued after Strontium Dogs was cancelled.

=== Revival ===
In the Prog 2000 holiday special, published at the end of 1999, Johnny Alpha was revived by his original creators, Wagner and Ezquerra. The new stories were set before Johnny's death.

The first story, "The Kreeler Conspiracy", was based on a treatment Wagner had written for an aborted Strontium Dog TV pilot, and featured Johnny working solo, but Wulf returned in subsequent stories. Wagner introduced the concept that all previous stories were 'folklore' and the current series was the truth, giving him free rein to alter a number of details (such as giving Johnny an AI computer assistant and Kreelman having been President of a unified Earth government). This concept was dropped after "Conspiracy", with the later stories directly harkening back to the original run.

A subsequent story in 2004, "Traitor To His Kind" (progs 1406–1415), introduced Johnny's half-brother, head of a brutal police unit that dealt with mutant crimes. Hired by pro-mutant First Lord Negus, Johnny was sent to get a kidnapped King Clarkie back from mutant guerillas; loath though he was to do so, he knew elements within the government were trying to use this as an excuse to viciously crack down on mutants. Johnny and Wulf rescue the King, as well as uncovering a conspiracy in the Home Office to allow the kidnapping and subsequently fake the King's murder so as to provide a reason for mutant brutalisation. While this led to an improvement in the lives of mutants, all of it was behind the scenes and Johnny Alpha was branded a traitor by mutants for working against his kind.

The 2009 story Blood Moon retconned in a fanatical mutant rebel leader, William Blood Moon, who was responsible for civilian massacres and suicide bombings. Johnny had been seconded to him during the war, and swore vengeance for Moon having his friend Mardi killed as a suicide bomber; years later, before meeting Wulf, he and other former rebel leaders would hunt down Blood Moon to kill him for his continuing terrorist atrocities. Johnny would use a time bomb to take Moon back to the site of Mardi's bombing and executed him there.

=== "The Life and Death of Johnny Alpha" ===
In prog 1689, June 2010, Wagner and Ezquerra began a strip called "The Life and Death of Johnny Alpha", which took place following "The Final Solution". The strip featured reporter Precious Matson trying to discover the true circumstances behind Johnny's death: the story explicitly stated itself to be a retcon and the "true" story of what happened, and diverged from "The Final Solution" when Precious revealed to Middenface McNulty that Johnny's body had been brought back by Feral (the original strip showed it destroyed and the remains left behind). Mutants remain on Earth, the S/D Agency still exists and has a new Doghouse satellite, and the UK government is said to be "apologists and mutie-lovers", ignoring Strontium Dogs.

Middenface and Precious went searching for the truth behind Johnny's death and the whereabouts of his body. In the process, they found out that Feral had taken the body on a quest for the Stone Wizards, immensely powerful entities that could bring Johnny back to life – but, as the cost would be his own life, he backed out and buried him instead. (Feral would end up executed during the story for unrelated crimes.) Precious and Middenface located the body and took it to the Stone Wizards, where McNulty offered to die so Johnny would live – the story ended with Johnny returning to life.

The story continued in three further installments from 2011 to 2014. Alpha discovered a conspiracy to secretly sterilise all mutants in New Britain. This revelation led to a new civil war, with Alpha leading the mutant faction.

After the conclusion of "The Life and Death of Johnny Alpha", the series returned to its bounty-hunter premise. In "The Son" (2018) a new character, Wulf Sternhammer's son Kenton, joined Johnny Alpha as a rookie Search/Destroy agent. This was the last Strontium Dog story to be illustrated by Carlos Ezquerra, who died later that year, and the last in the series to be written by John Wagner (as of May 2025). Other writers and artists have produced one-episode stories since, but no multi-part stories.

== Hiatus ==
Since the death of artist Carlos Ezquerra in October 2018, the editor of 2000AD, Matt Smith, has said he is yet to decide whether the series should continue without Ezquerra. However he has said that spin off series set around popular supporting characters are in development. A story starring the Stix Clan was later published in the May 2019 Villains Takeover Special. In 2020 a one-episode story about Johnny Alpha as a child appeared in prog 2183, by Michael Carroll and Nick Brokenshire.

== Crossover stories ==
Johnny Alpha has also appeared in three Judge Dredd stories, in which he travelled back in time to Dredd's era. The first was "Top Dogs", written by John Wagner, which appeared in the Judge Dredd Annual 1991 (published in 1990). The second was "Judgement Day", a 20-episode story written by Garth Ennis, which appeared in both 2000 AD and in the Judge Dredd Megazine in 1992. The third was "By Private Contract" in issue 2000 of 2000 AD in September 2016, also written by Wagner.

He also stars with Judge Dredd in the Big Finish audio book Pre-Emptive Revenge, in their attempt to stop a nuclear dirty bomb from launching while trying to reach safety after a successful co-operative mission.

== Publication ==
In 1987, Titan Books produced the first collected volume of Strontium Dog stories and others have appeared piecemeal over the years. Starting in 2007, Rebellion Developments released a complete run of collected Strontium Dog stories as the Search/Destroy Agency Files. In 2008 Rebellion also began reprinting the new series of stories. Most of the post-"Final Solution" Strontium Dogs stories were collected in softback collections bagged with issues of the Judge Dredd Megazine.

All material from "Max Quirxx" to "Journey into Hell" written by John Wagner and illustrated by Carlos Ezquerra unless otherwise stated. All stories thereafter written by John Wagner and Alan Grant writing in partnership unless otherwise stated.

- Agency File 01 (336 pages, 2007, ISBN 1-905437-15-3)
  - "Max Quirxx" (Starlord #1-2, 1978)
  - "Papa Por-ka" (Starlord #3–5, 1978)
  - "No Cure For Kansyr" (Starlord #6–7, 1978)
  - "Planet of the Dead"(Starlord #8–10, 1978)
  - "Two-Faced Terror!" (Starlord #12–15, 1978)
  - "Demon Maker" (Art: Brendan McCarthy 17; Ian Gibson 18–19; Starlord #17–19, 1978)
  - "The Ultimate Weapon" (Starlord #21–22, 1978)
  - "The Galaxy Killers" (2000 AD #86–94, 1978)
  - "Journey Into Hell" (2000 AD #104–118, 1979)
  - "Death’s Head" (2000 AD #178–181, 1980)
  - "The Schicklgruber Grab" (2000 AD #182–188, 1980)
  - "Mutie’s Luck" (2000 AD #189, 1980)
  - "The Doc Quince Case" (2000 AD #190–193, 1980–81)
  - "The Bad Boys Bust" (2000 AD #194–197, 1981)
- Agency File 02 (288 pages, June 15, 2007, ISBN 1-905437-29-3)
  - "Portrait of a Mutant" (2000 AD #200–206, 210–221, 1981)
  - "The Gronk Affair" (2000 AD #224–227, 1981)
  - "The Kid Knee Caper" (2000 AD #228–233, 1981)
  - "The Moses Incident" (2000 AD #335–345, 1983)
  - "The Killing" (2000 AD #350–359, 1984)
  - "Outlaw!" (2000 AD #363–385, 1984)
- Agency File 03 (384 pages, September 9, 2007, ISBN 1-905437-38-2)
  - "The Big Bust Of ’49" (2000 AD #415–424, 1985)
  - "The Slavers Of Drule" (2000 AD #425–436, 1985)
  - "Max Bubba" (2000 AD #445–465, 1985–86)
  - "Smiley’s World" (2000 AD #466–467, 1986)
  - "Rage" (2000 AD #469–489, 1986)
  - "Incident on Mayjer Minor" (2000 AD #490–496, 1986)
  - "Warzone!" (2000 AD #497–499, 1986)
  - "Incident at the Back o' Beyond" (written by Alan Grant, art by Robin Smith; 2000 AD 1983 Annual)
  - "The Beast of Milton Keynes" (written by Alan Grant; 2000 AD Annual 1986)
- Agency File 04 (352 pages, January 15, 2008, ISBN 1-905437-51-X)
  - "Bitch" (2000 AD #505–529, 1987)
  - "The Royal Affair" (2000 AD #532–536, 1987)
  - "A Sorry Case" (art by Colin MacNeil); (2000 AD #540–543, 1987)
  - "The Rammy" (2000 AD #544–553, 1987)
  - "The Stone Killers" (written by Grant alone; 2000 AD #560–572, 1988)
  - "Incident On Zeta" (written by Grant alone; plot suggested by Carlos Ezquerra; 2000 AD #573, 1988)
  - "The No-Go Job" (written by Grant alone; art by Simon Harrison; 2000 AD #580–587, 1988)
  - "Fever" (art by Kim Raymond; 2000 AD Annual 1987)
  - "Complaint" (2000 AD Annual 1988)
  - "Incident at the End of the World" (art by Keith Page; 2000 AD Annual 1991, 1990)
  - "Assault on Trigol 3" (written by Steve MacManus, art by Rob Moran; 2000 AD Sci-fi Special 1979)
  - "An Untold Tale of Johnny Alpha" (written by Peter Hogan, art by John Ridgway; 2000 AD Sci-fi Special 1992)
- The Final Solution (160 pages, May, 2008, ISBN 1-905437-63-3)
  - "The Final Solution" (part 1 - written by Grant alone; art by Simon Harrison; 2000 AD #600–606, 615–621, 636–641, 645–647, 1988–89)
  - "The Final Solution" (part 2 - written by Grant alone; art by Colin MacNeil; 2000 AD #682–687, 1990)
  - "Incident at the Birth of the Universe" (written by Grant alone; art by Kev Walker; 2000 AD Winter Special 1988)
  - "The Town that Died of Shame" (written by Grant alone; art by Brendan McCarthy and Colin MacNeil; 2000 AD Sci-Fi Special 1988)
  - "Judge Dredd: Top Dogs" (art by Colin MacNeil; Judge Dredd Annual 1991, 1990)
- Judge Dredd: Judgement Day (written by Garth Ennis; art by Carlos Ezquerra, Peter Doherty, Dean Ormston and Chris Cunningham (credited as Chris Halls); 2000 AD #786–799 and Judge Dredd Megazine volume 2 #4–9, 1992) (various reprints)
- "Night of the Blood-Freaks" (uncredited text story, in 2000 AD Annual 1981)

=== Revival ===
All stories written by John Wagner and illustrated by Carlos Ezquerra, except where otherwise indicated. Ezquerra's son Hector joined as inker and colourer for the stories from "Blood Moon" to "The Project". Initially, the revival comprised 'untold tales' all set prior to "The Final Solution".

- The Kreeler Conspiracy (September 2008, ISBN 978-1-905437-78-8)
  - "The Kreeler Conspiracy" 2000 AD #2000, (Note: Between 1999 and 2014, the final issue of 2000AD of the year was numbered after the incoming year so, for example, #2000 was the final issue of 1999 even though this was out of sequence with the regular numbering of the series. Different issues numbered 2000–2015 were published in 2016 when the regular numbering reached those numbers.) 1174–1180, 1195–1199 (1999–2000)
  - "The Sad Case" 2000 AD #2001 (2000)
  - "Roadhouse" 2000 AD #1300–1308 (2002)
  - "The Tax Dodge" 2000 AD #1350–1358 (2003)
  - "The Headly Foot Job" 2000 AD #1400–1403 (2004)
- Traitor to His Kind (July 2009, ISBN 978-1-906735-03-6)
  - "Traitor To His Kind" 2000 AD #1406–1415 (2004)
  - "A Shaggy Dog Story" 2000 AD #2006, 1469–1472 (2005–06)
  - "The Glum Affair" 2000 AD #2008, 1567–1576 (2007–08)
- Blood Moon (January 2010, ISBN 978-1-906735-24-1)
  - "Blood Moon" 2000 AD #2009, 1617–1628 (2008–09)
  - "The Mork Whisperer" 2000 AD #1651–1660 (2009)

All subsequent stories were set after "The Final Solution".

- The Life and Death of Johnny Alpha (July 2012, ISBN 978-1-781080-43-6)
  - "The Life and Death of Johnny Alpha" 2000 AD #1689–1699 (2010)
  - "The Life and Death of Johnny Alpha: The Project" 2000 AD #2012, 1764–1771 (2011–12)
  - "What If...? Max Bubba Hadn't Killed Wulf," written by Alan Grant. 2000 AD #1772 (2012)
- The Life and Death of Johnny Alpha: Dogs of War (January 2015, ISBN 978-1781083369)
  - "The Life and Death of Johnny Alpha: Mutant Spring" 2000 AD #2013, 1813–1821 (2012–13)
  - "The Life and Death of Johnny Alpha: Dogs of War" 2000 AD #2014, 1862–1870 (2013–14)
- Repo Men (March 2018, ISBN 978-1-781086-43-8)
  - "The Stix Fix" 2000 AD #1924–1933 (2015)
  - "Repo Men" 2000 AD #1961–1971 (2015–2016)
  - "Durham Red: The Judas Strain," written by Lauren Beukes and Dale Halvorsen. 2000 AD 40th Anniversary Special (2017)
- "Judge Dredd: By Private Contract" 2000 AD #2000 (2016) (collected in Judge Dredd: Guatemala, 2021)
- The Son (November 2022, ISBN 978-1-78618-676-8)
  - "The Son" 2000 AD #2073–2081 (2018)
  - "Once Upon a Time in Der Vest", written by Rob Williams, art by Laurence Campbell and Dylan Teague, in 2000 AD #2212 (2020)
  - "Durham Red: The 'Nobody Wants This Job' Job", written by Alan Grant, art by Carlos Ezquerra, in 2000 AD #1785-1790 (2012)
  - "What If...? Max Bubba Hadn't Killed Wulf," written by Alan Grant, in 2000 AD #1772 (2012)
  - "Wulf Sternhammer: Valhalla", written by Mike Carroll, art by Patrick Goddard, in 2000 AD Sci-Fi Special 2019
  - "Stix: Let Sleeping Dogs Lie", written by Matt Smith, art by Chris Weston, in 2000 AD Villains Special (2020)
- Uncollected:
  - "Trial Run!" written by Alec Worley, art by Ben Willsher, in 2000 AD Regened: Free Comic Book Day (2018)
  - "Acceptable Losses", written by Michael Carroll, art by Nick Brokenshire and John Charles, in 2000 AD #2183 (2020)
  - "In the (Dead) Doghouse", written by Rob Williams, art by Staz Johnson and Chris Blythe, in 2000 AD #2300 (2022) (crossover with other stories in that issue and in Judge Dredd Megazine #448)
  - "Alpha", written by Rufus Hound, art by Dan Cornwell and Dylan Teague, in 2000 AD #2362 (2023)
  - "Portrait of a Judge", written by Karl Stock, art by Ben Willsher, in 2000 AD Sci-Fi Special 2024
  - "Poison", written by Simon Spurrier, art by Hayden Sherman, in 2000 AD Annual 2025 (2024)
  - "Doghouse Roses", written by Garth Ennis, art by Henry Flint, in 2000 AD #2413 (2024)
  - "The Holliday Job", written by Karl Stock, art by Jake Lynch & Jim Boswell, in 2000 AD Sci-Fi Special 2025
  - "The Necks Case", written by Karl Stock, art by Colin MacNeil & Dylan Teague, in 2000 AD #2463 (2025)
  - "The Royal Mess", written by Karl Stock, art by Colin MacNeil & Jim Boswell, in 2000 AD Sci-Fi Special 2026

=== Spin-offs ===
Following "The Final Solution" there were a number of spin-off series, with Durham Red and Middenface McNulty (and later Young Middenface). In addition, Strontium Dogs focused on the other bounty hunters, especially The Gronk and Feral.

- Strontium Dogs:
  - "Monsters" (written by Garth Ennis, with art by Steve Pugh, #750–761, 1991)
  - "Dead Man's Hand" (written by Garth Ennis, with art by Simon Harrison, in 2000 AD Yearbook 1993, 1992)
  - "Return of the Gronk" (written by Garth Ennis, with art by Nigel Dobbyn, in 2000 AD #817–824, 1993)
  - "Angel Blood" (written by Igor Goldkind, with art by Jon Beeston and Colin MacNeil, in 2000 AD Sci-Fi Special 1993, June 1993)
  - "How The Gronk Got His Heartses" (written by Garth Ennis, with art by Nigel Dobbyn, in 2000 AD #850–851, 1993)
  - "The Darkest Star" (written by Garth Ennis, with art by Nigel Dobbyn, in 2000 AD #855–866, 1993)
  - "Crossroads" (written by Peter Hogan, with art by Nigel Dobbyn, in 2000 AD #897–899, 1994)
  - "Fast Breeder" (text story written by John Smith, illustrations by Pauline Doyle, in 2000 AD Sci-Fi Special 1994)
  - "Alphabet Man" (written by Peter Hogan, with art by Nigel Dobbyn, in 2000 AD #937–939, 1995)
  - "High Moon" (written by Peter Hogan, with art by Mark Harrison, in 2000 AD #940–947, 1995)
  - "The Mutant Sleeps Tonight" (written by Peter Hogan, with art by Simon Harrison, in 2000 AD #957, 1995)
  - "Hate & War" (written by Peter Hogan, as Alan Smithee, with art by Trevor Hairsine, in 2000 AD #993–999, 1996)

Prior to "The Final Solution" there was an intermittent series of one-off stories called Tales From the Doghouse, featuring other S/D agents.

- Strontium Dog – Tales From the Doghouse:
  - "Back-to-Front Jones" (in 2000 AD #578, 1988)
  - "Tom 'Birdy' Lilley" (in 2000 AD #579, 1988)
  - "Freddy 'Chameleon' Finegan" (in 2000 AD #612, 1989)
  - "Edward "Spud" O’Riley" (in 2000 AD #613, 1989)
  - "Maeve the Many-Armed" (in 2000 AD #617–618, 1989)
  - "'Sting' Ray" (in 2000 AD #623–624, 1989)
  - "'Froggy' Natterjack" (in 2000 AD #625, 1989)
  - "Jerry 'Ratty' Cagney" (in 2000 AD #626, 1989)
  - "Maeve the Many-Armed in: "Niall of the Nine Sausages" (in 2000 AD #636–638, 1989)
  - "Chris 'Moosey' Day in: 'The Island" (in 2000 AD #649, 1989)

In 2019 there was a story about another Strontium Dog called Stix.

- Stix: "Sleeping Dogs Lie" (written by Matt Smith, art by Chris Weston, in 2000 AD Villains Takeover Special, 2019)

== In other media ==
=== Fan film ===
A fan film, Search/Destroy, premiered at 2000 AD's 40 Years of Thrill-Power Festival, on February the 11th 2017. John Wagner and Carlos Ezquerra both praised the film, which received 3 1/2 to 5 star reviews from several Sci-Fi and comic related outlets.

=== Computer games ===
In 1984, a computer game called Strontium Dog: The Killing was released by Quicksilva for the ZX Spectrum. In the game, (based on the storyline "The Killing" from progs 350–359,) Alpha has to rid the galaxy of all the 'vicious murderers' by roaming through a maze of corridors and rooms killing the murderers with his gun. The game was of extremely poor quality, with reviews of the period deriding it for poor graphics, a lack of playability and for being extremely boring.

The same year, Quicksilva released Strontium Dog: The Death Gauntlet, a side-scrolling shoot-em-up for the Commodore 64.

=== Board game ===
In 2018 Warlord Games released tabletop skirmish game called "Strontium Dog Miniatures Game".

=== Novels ===
In 2003, Black Flame started publishing official 2000 AD novels, including five featuring Strontium Dog. These were:

- Bad Timing (Rebecca Levene, June 2004 ISBN 1-84416-110-2)
- Prophet Margin (Simon Spurrier, December 2004 ISBN 1-84416-134-X)
- Ruthless (Jonathan Clements, April 2005 ISBN 1-84416-136-6)
- Day of the Dogs (Andrew Cartmel, July 2005 ISBN 1-84416-218-4)
- A Fistful of Strontium (Jaspre Bark and Steve Lyons, October 2005 ISBN 1-84416-270-2)

=== Audio dramas ===
In recent years, Big Finish Productions have released a number of audio dramas with 2000 AD characters. These have mostly featured Judge Dredd, but three have starred Strontium Dog. In these, Judge Dredd and Wulf Sternhammer are played by Toby Longworth, and Johnny Alpha is played by Simon Pegg. The current list of Strontium Dog plays includes:

- 3. Strontium Dog: Down to Earth by Jonathan Clements
- 10. Strontium Dog: Fire from Heaven by Jonathan Clements
- 16. Judge Dredd: Pre-Emptive Revenge by Jonathan Clements (taking place in the immediate aftermath of the Judge Dredd/Strontium Dog crossover story "Judgement Day")

=== Film ===
In the opening scene of the 2012 film Dredd, one of the "mega blocks" of Mega-City One is named "Sternhammer".

=== Fanzines ===
Dogbreath is an unofficial small press comic produced by fans of the series.

== In popular culture ==
In an episode of TV sitcom Spaced, an angry Mike tells his friend Tim to remember "whose shoulder you cried on" when Johnny Alpha was killed in 2000 AD. Tim's actor and Spaced co-author Simon Pegg later went on to play Johnny Alpha in the Big Finish Productions Strontium Dog audio plays.

== See also ==
- Middenface McNulty
- Durham Red
