= Dean Ormston =

British born comic book artist

- Born: 7 August 1961 (age 65)
- Areas: Penciler, Inker
- Notable works: Bodies; Black Hammer; Harke & Burr; The Girl Who Would Be Death

Dean Ormston is a British born comic book artist. His most notable work has been for the British comic 2000 AD and for DC Comics' Vertigo imprint.

== Biography ==
Ormston was born in Barnsley, South Yorkshire, England and earned a degree in art and illustration at Leeds University sometime around the mid-1980s. For the following few years he spent his time between playing the drums in various bands, some of which released singles and compilation album tracks (The Silent Scream, The second Coming, This Colossal Youth) and working part-time in a Sheffield comic-book shop with fellow budding artists Nick Percival, Greg Staples and filmmaker Lee Ford. Sometime in 1990 he moved into working full-time as an artist working mainly for Judge Dredd Megazine.

Ormston's dark, thick paints were seen in action on the Judge Dredd strip on numerous occasions, most notably in the Judgement Day and Raptaur storylines. Ormston also created, the comedy strip Harke & Burr with Si Spencer. Harke & Burr is a twist on the notorious grave robbers Burke and Hare. He drew part of "The Kindly Ones" story arc in Neil Gaiman's The Sandman series. His work can also be seen in the Predator comics for Dark Horse, Lucifer and Books of Magic for DC Vertigo.

Ormston's prominent American comic credits include 'Bodies' for DC Vertigo which has been adapted for Netflix as an 8 part series starring Stephen Graham. The Girl Who Would Be Death, many issues of Lucifer, and primary artist on Books of Magick: Life During Wartime, all published under the Vertigo imprint of DC Comics.

His other works include a brief spell as character designer for Mainframe Animation where he co-created Dot's Bots with writer Steve Seagle, a proposed 13-episode series that so far has only made it to a 30-minute pilot episode. His Reboot Character design of Daemon can be seen in the TV movie Daemon Rising made in 2001.

Ormston is the artist and co-creator of Black Hammer with writer Jeff Lemire, colorist Dave Stewart (artist), and letterer Todd Klein. The series won the 2017 Eisner Award for Best New Series.

== Bibliography ==
- Judge Dredd:
  - "I Singe the Body Electric" (with Alan Grant, in Judge Dredd Megazine #1.06, 1991)
  - "Raptaur" (with Alan Grant, in Judge Dredd Megazine #1.11–1.17, 1991)
  - "Judgement Day" (with Garth Ennis, in Judge Dredd Megazine #2.04–2.06, 2.08–2.09, 1992)
  - "Fall of the House of Esher" (with Si Spencer, in Judge Dredd Megazine #2.70, 1995)
  - "Killing Grounds" (with John Smith, in Judge Dredd Megazine #3.13, 1996)
  - "Doledrums" (with Alan Grant, in 2000 AD #1176, 2000)
  - "The in Club" (with John Wagner, in 2000 AD #1362, 2003)
- Harke & Burr (with Si Spencer):
  - "Antique and Curious" (in Judge Dredd Megazine #2.27–2.28, 1993)
  - "Hamster Horror" (in Judge Dredd Megazine #2.40–2.42, 1995)
  - "Grief Encounter" (in Judge Dredd Megazine #2.47–2.49, 1994)
  - "Satanic Farces" (with co-author Gordon Rennie, in Judge Dredd Megazine #3.04–3.07, 1995)
- Ammo Armageddon #1: "Bug Hunt" (Atomeka, 1993)
- Sandman Mystery Theatre Annual #1: "The Bystanders" (Vertigo, 1995)
- The Eaters (with Peter Milligan, Vertigo, 1995)
- The Crow: City of Angels (with John Wagner and Phil Hester, Kitchen Sink Press, 1996)
- The Sandman: The Kindly Ones (with Neil Gaiman, 1996)
- House of Secrets (with Steven T. Seagle, Vertigo):
  - Digol, issue 11, 1997
  - Plyck, issue 16, 1998
- Mythos: The Final Tour #3: "Book Three: Salvage" (with John Ney Rieber, Vertigo, 1997)
- Lucifer (with Mike Carey):
  - A Dalliance with the Damned, issues 14–20 (ISBN 1-84023-470-9)
  - The Divine Comedy, issues 21–28 (ISBN 1-84023-693-0)
  - Inferno, issues 29–35 (ISBN 1-4012-0210-1)
  - Mansions of the Silence, issues 36–41 (ISBN 1-4012-0249-7)
  - Evensong, issues 70–75 and the Nirvana one-shot (ISBN 1-4012-1200-X)
- Predator:
  - "Hell Come a Walkin'" (with Nancy A. Collins, two-issue mini-series, 1998)
  - "Captive" (with Gordon Rennie, one-shot, May 1998)
- The Girl Who Would Be Death (with Caitlín R. Kiernan, 4-issue miniseries, Vertigo, 1998–1999)
- Ozzy Osbourne #1: "Speak of the Devil" (with Paul Jenkins, Image Comics, 1999)
- Missionary Man: "The Promised Land" (with Gordon Rennie, in 2000 AD #1186–1188, 2000)
- Totems (with Tom Peyer, Vertigo, 2000)
- The Monarchy #5: "The Boy Who Talked To Spiders" (with Doselle Young, Wildstorm, 2001)
- Books of Magick: Life During Wartime (with Si Spencer, issues 1–5, 7–9, 11–12, with Steve Yeowell, 13–15, 2005–2006)
- Tales From the Black Museum: "Shades of Grue" (with Al Ewing, in Judge Dredd Megazine No. 252, 2006)
- Testament No. 18 (with Douglas Rushkoff, DC Comics, May 2007)
- Northlanders issues No. 9 & No. 10 (with Brian Wood, Vertigo, 2008)
- The World of Black Hammer (co-creator with Jeff Lemire, Dark Horse Comics)
  - Black Hammer #1–8, #10–11, #13 (with Jeff Lemire, 2016–2017)
  - "The Quantum Age" (with Jeff Lemire and Wilfredo Torres, in Free Comic Book Day: Overwatch / Black Hammer, 2018)
  - Black Hammer: Age of Doom #1–5, #8–12 (with Jeff Lemire, 2018–2019)
