= Jeacocke =

Jeacocke or Jeacock is a surname. Notable people with the surname include:

- Alfred Jeacocke (1892–1961), English cricketer
- Paul Jeacock (born 1963), English cricketer
- Sheree Jeacocke (born 1958), Canadian singer-songwriter
