= Colin MacNeil =

British comics artist

- Areas: Penciller, Inker
- Notable works: Judge Dredd

Colin MacNeil is a British comics artist, best known for his work on 2000 AD and in particular on Judge Dredd and other stories within his world like Shimura and Devlin Waugh.

MacNeil has illustrated cards for the Magic: The Gathering collectible card game.

== Bibliography ==
- Tharg's Future Shocks (with Grant Morrison, collected in The Best of Tharg's Future Shocks, 160 pages, November 2008, ISBN 1-905437-81-1):
  - "Fruitcake and Veg" (in 2000 AD #508-509, 1987)
  - "Fair Exchange" (in 2000 AD #514, 1987)
- Strontium Dog (with Alan Grant):
  - "A Sorry Case" (in 2000 AD #540-543, 1987)
  - "The Final Solution: Replay" (in 2000 AD #682, 1990)
  - "The Final Solution Part 2" (in 2000 AD #683-687, 1990)
- Chopper (with John Wagner):
  - "Soul on Fire" (in 2000 AD #594-597, 1988)
  - "Song of the Surfer" (in 2000 AD #654-665, 1989)
- Judge Dredd:
  - "Our Man in Hondo" (with John Wagner, in 2000 AD #608-611, 1989)
  - "Firepower" (with Garth Ennis. in 2000 AD #736, 1991)
  - America: The Complete America (with John Wagner, Titan, 2003, ISBN 1-84023-615-9):
    - "America" (in Judge Dredd Megazine vol. 1 #1-7, 1990, also collected in Classic 2000 AD #1, 1995 and another tpb, America, Fleetway, 1991, ISBN 1-85386-250-9)
    - "Fading of the Light" (in Judge Dredd Megazine vol. 3 #30-25, 1996)
  - "Mechanismo" (with John Wagner, in Judge Dredd Megazine vol. 3 #12-17, 1992)
  - "Snowstorm" (with Garth Ennis, in 2000 AD #819, 1993)
  - "It's a Dreddful Life" (with Robbie Morrison/Jim Alexander, in Judge Dredd Megazine vol. 2 #44-45, 1993–94)
  - "Funeral in Mega-City One" (with John Wagner, in Judge Dredd Poster Prog #4, 1994)
  - "The Pit" (with John Wagner, in 2000 AD #978-980, 1996)
  - "On The Chief Judge’s Service" (with John Wagner, in 2000 AD #1263-1266, 2001)
  - "Terror" (with John Wagner, in 2000 AD #1392-1399, 2004)
  - "Cadet" (with John Wagner, in Judge Dredd Megazine #250-252, 2006)
  - "The Secret of Mutant Camp" (with John Wagner, in 2000 AD #1547-1548, 2007)
  - "Test Flight" (with Gordon Rennie, in 2000 AD #1554, 2007)
  - "Emphatically Evil: The Life and Crimes of PJ Maybe" (with John Wagner, in 2000 AD #1569-1575, 2008)
  - "Tour of Duty" (with John Wagner, in 2000 AD #1650-1655, 2009)
  - "Tour of Duty - Gore City" (with John Wagner, in 2000 AD #1664-1667 and #2010 (special New Year issue), 2009–2010)
- The Road to Hell (with Dwayne McDuffie/Matt Wayne, in Toxic! #30-31, 1991)
- Batman: Legends of the Dark Knight #37 (with Dan Abnett/Andy Lanning, DC Comics, September 1992)
- Strontium Dogs: "Angel Blood" (with Igor Goldkind and Jon Beeston, in 2000AD Sci-Fi Special 1993)
- "Death's Dark Riders" (with Roy Thomas, in The Savage Sword of Conan #219-220, Marvel Comics, March–April 1994, tpb, The Saga of Solomon Kane. Dark Horse Comics, July 2009, ISBN 1-59582-317-4)
- The Corps: "Fireteam One" (with Garth Ennis, Si Spencer and Paul Marshall, in 2000 AD #918-923, 1994)
- Shimura (with Robbie Morrison):
  - "Outcast" (in Judge Dredd Megazine vol. 2 #50-55, 1994)
  - "The Harder They Come" (in Judge Dredd Megazine #238-243, 2005)
- Tales of Suspense vol. 2 (with James Robinson, one-shot, Marvel Select/Marvel Comics, January 1995)
- Predator: "Nemesis" (with Gordon Rennie, two-issue mini-series, Dark Horse Comics, 1997, collected in Predator Omnibus Volume 4, 352 pages, September 2008, ISBN 1-59307-990-7)
- Bloodquest: Eye of Terror Trilogy (with Gordon Rennie, Warhammer 40,000, Black Library, 256 pages, 2005, ISBN 1-84416-146-3) collects:
  - Bloodquest (104 pages, 1999, ISBN 1-84154-108-7)
  - Bloodquest: Into the Eye of Terror (54 pages, 2001, ISBN 1-84154-126-5)
  - Bloodquest: The Daemon's Mark (96 pages, 2003, ISBN 1-84416-057-2)
- Battlefleet Gothic (with Gordon Rennie, in Battlefleet Gothic, Games Workshop, 8 pages, 1999)
  - Reprinted in Warhammer Monthly 34, September 2000, ISSN 1461-2089
  - Reprinted in The Gothic War, 518 pages, 2010, ISBN 1-84416-900-6
- Maelstrom (with Robbie Morrison, in Judge Dredd Megazine vol. 2 #73-80, 1995)
- Missionary Man: "The Promised Land" (with Gordon Rennie, in 2000 AD #1178-1180, 2000)
- Vanguard (with Robbie Morrison, in 2000 AD #1212-1219, 2000)
- Satanus Unchained! (with Gordon Rennie, in 2000 AD #1241-1246, 2001)
- Devlin Waugh (with John Smith):
  - "Red Tide Prologue" (in Judge Dredd Megazine #201, 2003)
  - "Red Tide" (in Judge Dredd Megazine #202-213, 2003)
  - "Vile Bodies" (in Judge Dredd Megazine #227, 2005)
  - "All Hell" (in Judge Dredd Megazine #231-235 and 237, 2005)
- Insurrection (with Dan Abnett, in Judge Dredd Megazine #279-284, January–May 2009)
