= Simon Davis (artist) =

British comics artist

- Born: 1968 (age 57–58) Stratford-upon-Avon, Warwickshire, England, United Kingdom
- Areas: Penciller, Artist, Inker, Colourist
- Notable works: Sinister Dexter; Sláine; Black Siddha; Stone Island

Simon Davis (born 1968) is a British portraits artist and comics artist. In comics he is known for his fully painted art work for 2000 AD on "Sinister Dexter", "Sláine" and "Stone Island". Later in his career he became a member of the Royal Birmingham Society of Artists and the Royal Society of Portrait Painters, and he has produced prize-winning fine art for the National Portrait Gallery.

== Biography ==
Born in 1968 in Stratford-upon-Avon, Warwickshire, Davis attended Alcester Grammar School, before gaining a "Diploma in Technical illustration" from Mid-Warwickshire College, Leamington Spa in 1986. He subsequently studied illustration and graphic design at Swindon College of Art and after graduating in 1988, he worked as a graphic designer and freelance illustrator of books and magazines for the next five years before moving into comics work in 1993/1994.

Davis lives in London.

=== Comics ===
Davis has largely worked for the UK anthology 2000 AD. For that publication, he has been a major contributor to the Missionary Man strip with writer Gordon Rennie, and to Sinister Dexter with Dan Abnett. He painted the Sinister and Dexter duo's first full-length story, "Gunshark Vacation", described by then-editor David Bishop as "a big fat hit". He has also been the sole illustrator on a number of recent stories including Black Siddha and Stone Island. His work has been published around the world, most notably in the UK, US and Germany.

=== Portraiture ===
As a painter of "contemporary figurative paintings" and portraits, mainly in oils, he is a member of both the Royal Birmingham Society of Artists (appointed as an Associate member in 2004, and full member in 2005) and the Royal Society of Portrait Painters (from 2007), exhibiting at a number of British art galleries, including the National Portrait Gallery.

=== Awards ===
Davis "won the Tanner Charitable Trust Prize in August 2004 with his contemporary painting, 'Sarah and Rosie'," at the RBSA, repeating this win two years later. He won "a prize in the RBSA Open Exhibition for a portrait painting of the BBC Midlands presenter Shefali Oza" in 2005, and in October 2006 won "the Coley Tilley Prize for a portrait painting 'The RSC Wig Mistress'." In 2008 he won second place in the BP Portrait Award for his painting of Amanda Smith.

=== Other work ===
Davis also works on storyboarding music videos by Muse and Tori Amos and TV adverts for Barclaycard, Levi's and the BBC, for whom he has also provided "illustrations for the BBC "Cult" Website."

== Bibliography ==
=== Comics ===
Comics work includes:

- Missionary Man (with Gordon Rennie):
  - "The Undertaker Cometh" (in Judge Dredd Mega-Special No. 7, 1994)
  - "Treasure of the Sierra Murder" (in Judge Dredd Megazine #2.63–2.66, 1994)
  - "Mississippi Burning" (in Judge Dredd Megazine 3.01–3.03, 1995)
  - "The Big Sleazy" (in Judge Dredd Megazine #3.18–3.20, 1996)
  - "Missionary Man: Prologue" (in 2000 AD #1091, 1998)
  - "The Promised Land" (in 2000 AD #1183–1185, 2000)
- Judge Dredd:
  - "Compassion Fatigue" (with Robbie Morrison, in Judge Dredd Megazine #3.08, 1995)
  - "The Trial" (with John Wagner, in 2000 AD #1148–1150, 1999)
  - "Survivor Type" (with John Smith, in 2000 AD #1190, April 2000)
- Sinister Dexter (with Dan Abnett):
  - "Wish Upon A Czar" (in 2000 AD #992–993, 1996)
  - "Gunshark Vacation" (in 2000 AD #1024–1031, 1997, collected in Gunshark Vacation, tpb, 128 pages, Rebellion Developments, September 2004, ISBN 1-904265-16-2, DC Comics, October 2004, ISBN 1-4012-0391-4)
  - "Murder 101" (in 2000 AD #1051–1061, 1997, collected in Murder 101, tpb, 160 pages, Rebellion, January 2005, ISBN 1-904265-26-X, DC Comics, ISBN 1-4012-0575-5)
  - "Lyrical Bollards" (in 2000 AD #1086, 1998, collected in Slay Per View, tpb, 240 pages, Rebellion, May 2005, ISBN 1-904265-38-3, DC Comics, June 2005, ISBN 1-4012-0587-9))
  - Eurocrash (tpb, 160 pages, Rebellion, March 2009, ISBN 1-905437-93-5) collects:
    - "Eurocrash" (in 2000 AD #1127–1139, 1998, collected in )
    - "Exit Wounds" (in 2000 AD Prog 2000, 1999)
    - "Life Behind Bars" (in 2000 AD #1198–1199, 2000)
  - Money Shots (tpb, 192 pages, Rebellion, October 2009, ISBN 1-906735-17-4) collects:
    - "Feeding Frenzy" (in 2000 AD #1200–1202, 2000)
    - "The Man in the Ion Mask" (in 2000 AD #1223–1226, 2000)
  - "The Off-Lode Experience" (in 2000 AD #1312, 2002)
  - "Get Shirty" (in 2000 AD Prog 2003, 2002)
  - "Junk Bond" (in 2000 AD #1356–1361, 2003)
  - "Five Go Postal in Downlode" (in 2000 AD Prog 2004, 2003)
  - "Dunce Macabre" (in 2000 AD Prog 2005, 2004)
  - "Slow Train to Kal Cutter" (in 2000 AD #1443–1449, 2005)
  - "...and Death shall have no dumb minions" (in 2000 AD #1459–1468, 2005)
  - "Festive Spirits" (in 2000 AD Prog 2006, 2005)
  - "The Last Thing I Do" (in 2000 AD #1528–1533, 2007)
- Outlaw: "Deadliest Man Alive" (with Paul Neal, in 2000 AD #1001–1002, 1012–1013, 1996)
- Vector 13: "Case Ten: Case Closed?" (with David Bishop, in 2000 AD #1032, 1997)
- B.L.A.I.R. 1:
  - "B.L.A.I.R. 1" (with David Bishop/Steve MacManus, in 2000 AD #1034, 1997)
  - "Blair Force One" (with Alan Grant, in 2000 AD #1071–1074, 1997)
  - "Criminal Record" (with Alan Grant, in 2000 AD #1084, 1998)
  - "He Died with his Boots on" (with Alan Grant, in 2000 AD #1097–1098, 1998)
- "Unearthed Remains" (with Gordon Rennie, in Inferno! No. 9, 1998)
- Downlode Tales: "Lock and 'Lode" (with Dan Abnett, in 2000 AD #1161–1168, 1999)
- Tales of Telguuth: "The Eternal Bliss of Zebba Horath" (with Steve Moore, in 2000 AD #1194, 2000)
- JLA: Riddle of the Beast (with Alan Grant, Elseworlds DC Comics, hardcover, 2001, paperback, 2003)
- Black Siddha (with Pat Mills):
  - "Bad Karma" (in Judge Dredd Megazine #202–208, 2003)
  - "Kali Yuga" (in Judge Dredd Megazine #218–223, 2004)
  - "Return of the Jester" (in Judge Dredd Megazine #245–252, 2006)
- Stone Island (with Ian Edginton, tpb, 112 pages, February 2008, ISBN 1-905437-57-9) collects:
  - "Stone Island" (in 2000 AD #1500–1507, 2006)
  - "The Harrowers" (in 2000 AD #1550–1559, 2007)
- Ampney Crucis Investigates (with Ian Edginton):
  - "Vile Bodies" (in 2000 AD #1611–1616, 2008)
  - "The End of the Pier Show" (in 2000 AD Prog 2010 and #1666–1671, 2009–2010)
  - "The List of Ten" (in 2000 AD Prog 2011 and #1715–1723, 2010–2011)
  - "The English Assassin" (in 2000 AD #1750–1760, 2011)
  - "The Entropy Tango" (in 2000 AD Prog 2013 and #1813-1822, 2012–2013)
- Damnation Station (with Al Ewing):
  - "To The Dark & Empty Skies" (in 2000 AD #1677–1680, 2010)
  - "A Bone to be Chewed" (in 2000 AD #1686–1687, 2010)
  - "Even Heroes Fail" (in 2000 AD #1690–1692, 2011)
- Sláine: The Brutania Chronicles (with Pat Mills):
  - "A Simple Killing" (in 2000 AD #1874-1886, 2014)
    - collected in:Sláine: The Brutania Chronicles Book 1, hc, 112 pages, January 2015, ISBN 1-78108-335-5)
  - "Primordial" (in 2000 AD #1924-1936, 2015)
    - collected in: Sláine: The Brutania Chronicles Book 2, hc, 112 pages, January 2015, ISBN 1-78108-335-5)
  - "Psychopomp" (in 2000 AD #1979-1988, 2016)
  - "Red Branch" (in 2000 AD 40th Anniversary Special, 2017)
    - collected in: Sláine: The Brutania Chronicles Book 3, hc, 101 pages, February 2017, ISBN 1-78108-546-3)
  - "Archon" (in 2000 AD #2050-2060, 2017)
    - collected in: Sláine: The Brutania Chronicles Book 4, hc, 96 pages, August 2018, ISBN 1-78108-632-X)
- Thistlebone (with T. C. Eglington, in 2000 AD #2135-2144, 2019)
  - collected in: Thistlebone Book 1, hc, 64 pages, April 2021, ISBN 1-78108-778-4)

=== Covers ===
Cover work includes:

- The Crow #7–10 (Image Comics, 1999)
- Cy-Gor #3–6 (Image Comics, 1999)
- Spawn: The Dark Ages No. 11, 15 (Image Comics, 2000)
