= Paul Peart =

British comics artist

Paul Peart Smith
- Area: Artist

Paul Peart (also known as Paul Peart-Smith) is a British comics artist who has done some work for 2000 AD, Nelson, H.P Lovecraft, and many other publications.

== Bibliography ==
- Judge Hershey: "Down Time" (with Dave Stone, in Judge Dredd Megazine #2.09 1992)
- Slaughterbowl (with John Smith, in 2000 AD #842-849, 1993)
- Judge Dredd:
  - "Do the Wrong Thing" (with Gordon Rennie, in Judge Dredd Megazine #2.49 1994)
  - "Under Siege" (with Mark Millar, in 2000 AD #880, 1994)
  - "Dredd Has Been Murdered" (with Alan McKenzie 2000AD Sci-Fi Special 1995, 1995)
  - "Sponts A-Go-Go" (with Chris Standley and Roger Langridge, Judge Dredd Lawman of the Future #14, 1996)
  - "Medusa" (with Alan Barnes and Roger Langridge, Judge Dredd Lawman of the Future #19-20, 1996)
  - "Control" (with Robbie Morrison, in Judge Dredd Megazine #3.18 1996)
- Harke & Burr: "Secret Origin" (with Si Spencer, in Judge Dredd Megazine #2.83 1995)
- Tharg's Future Shocks: "Brush With Fate" (with Win Wiacek, in 2000 AD #949, 1995)
- Tracer (with Dave Stone, in 2000 AD #948-949, 1995)
- "Horrible History" comic book artist/cartoonist, published by Eaglemoss 2003 -2005
- "Jackie Chan Adventures" illustrator, published by Eaglemoss 2003-2005
- "Horrible Science" comic book artist/cartoonist, published by Eaglemoss 2002 -2006
- "Wallace and Gromit" comic published by Titan 2006 - 2007
- "One Plus One" written and drawn by Paul Peart Smith, published online as a web comic on the Activate website, http://www.activatecomix.com, 2009 - 2010
- "Black Power" a history of black comics exhibition at the Swiss Cottage Gallery, London, 2010. Curated by Paul Peart Smith and George Nelson.
- "1979" in "Nelson" published by Blank Slate in 2011, coloured by Rob Davis, edited by Woodrow Phoenix and Rob Davis.
- "Erotic Fantasy Now" edited by Paul Peart Smith, published by Ilex, 2011
- "He" in "H.P Lovecraft Anthology 2 "published by Self Made Hero in 2012, written by Dwight L. Macpherson
- Design Manager for Home Fundraising Ltd.
- "Edge of Extinction" Comics Artist, published by Eighth Continent, written by Baden Mellonie
- Lead Animation Background Artist on "Fanshaw and Crudnut" for Blue Rocket Productions, appearing on Australian Channel 9 and GOtv. 2015-2016
- "Graveyard Song" self published, 2016
- Lead Background Artist on Bikey Face an Animated short.
- Comics Artist on Edge Of Extinction 2, Cast No Shadow Exhibition, Cover illustrator for Freedom City Comics, Self published A-OK manga style comic.
