= Gordon Rennie =

Scottish comics writer (active 1991–2013)

- Area: Writer
- Notable works: Judge Dredd; Caballistics, Inc. Necronauts
- Awards: 2004, Diamond Comics Awards, Graphic Novel of the Year

Gordon Rennie is a Scottish comics writer, responsible for White Trash: Moronic Inferno, as well as several comic strips for 2000 AD and novels for Warhammer Fantasy.

In May 2008, he announced he was leaving comics to concentrate full-time on video games which "are more fun, pay better and have a brighter future". However, he has since written several new series for 2000 AD, Titan and others.

== Biography ==
His first work was published in Blast! magazine in 1991, a metafictional Sherlock Holmes story called "Sherlock Holmes in the Curious Case of the Vanishing Villain", painted by Woodrow Phoenix. It also had appearances by characters from other Victorian fiction including Dr Jekyll and Mr Hyde and characters from stories by Edgar Allan Poe.

He included a completely different White Trash in the same issue - a satirical journey through the USA, drawn by the New Zealand artist Martin Emond. Both these stories were later collected into one-shot graphic novels and published by Tundra Publishing. Two further planned collaborations with Phoenix, a one-shot graphic novel called Orson Welles: Special Agent! and Necronauts, later completed with Frazer Irving, were halted when Tundra Press ceased publishing in 1993.

Rennie's first major series for the 2000 AD family was Missionary Man, which began in Judge Dredd Megazine vol.2 #29 (5/93) and ran between the latter and 2000 AD for 74 episodes before finishing in 2002. Other original series include Witch World (1997) and Rain Dogs (2000). He also took over the exploits of the Judge Dredd villain Mean Machine (2000–2001), as well as the return of the original Rogue Trooper (2002–2004).

His works for 2000 AD include the miniseries Necronauts (2000–2001), in which Harry Houdini, Arthur Conan Doyle, Charles Fort and H. P. Lovecraft team up to defeat an alien menace that seeks to destroy the human race. This was followed up by the series Caballistics, Inc., a story about a recently privatized team of occult researchers, which included a combination of pop-cultural references and labyrinthine conspiracies.

By 2004, Rennie had become a writer on the Judge Dredd strip, following up a number of subplots initiated by its principal author, John Wagner, as well as developing his own situations and guest characters, some of whom have spun off into stories of their own. While the lengthier Judge Dredd adventures are typically scripted by Wagner, Rennie was awarded one in 2005. This story, "Blood Trails", ran for ten episodes beginning in 2000 AD prog 1440 (5/25/05).

His contribution to the series of novels expanding miniature wargaming platforms Warhammer Fantasy, Warhammer 40,000 and Battlefleet Gothic include Zavant, Ulli and Marquand, the Kal Jerico stories, Bloodquest, Execution Hour and Shadow Point.

Rennie has worked on computer games. In 2006, his script for the game Rogue Trooper was nominated for the 2006 BAFTA, and in 2012 he, along with co-scriptwriters Alan Barnes and Emma Beeby, received a nomination for the 2012 Writers' Guild of Great Britain's Best Videogame Script award for Risen 2: Dark Waters.

In May 2008, he was quoted as saying, "I got fed up with comics and quit last month to concentrate on games." Although he later said he was misquoted, and that he has not completely given up comics, as he would still be writing an ongoing series for 2000 AD. At that time, Rennie was also planning a novel on the Romans in Scotland. He has since returned to 2000 AD to write the serials Aquila, Jaegir and Survival Geeks.

He also co-wrote The Doomsday Quatrain and sections of 1001 Nights with Emma Beeby for Big Finish Productions' Doctor Who main range of audio plays.

He is known for maintaining close links with the fan community, for example by contributing to small press comics such as Solar Wind, despite a public persona he describes as "a grumpy Scottish git".

== Works ==
=== Comics ===
Comics work includes:

- "Sewer Patrol" (with Robin Smith, in Toxic! #31, 1991)
- "Sherlock Holmes in the Curious Case of the Vanishing Villain" (with Woodrow Phoenix, in Blast!, 1991, Tundra, 1992)
- White Trash (with Martin Emond, Tundra, 1992)
- Missionary Man:
  - "Salvation at the Last Chance Saloon" (with Frank Quitely, in Judge Dredd Megazine #2.29, 1993)
  - "A Town Called Intolerance" (with Frank Quitely, in Judge Dredd Megazine #2.30, 1993)
  - "Legend of the Unholy Drinker" (with Garry Marshall, in Judge Dredd Megazine #2.43, 1993)
  - "Bad Moon Rising" (with Frank Quitely, in Judge Dredd Megazine #2.50-2.55, 1994)
  - "Season of the Witch" (with Garry Marshall, in Judge Dredd Megazine #2.56-2.57, 1994)
  - "Sanctuary" (with Sean Longcroft, in Judge Dredd Megazine #2.58-2.59, 1994)
  - "The Undertaker Cometh" (with Simon Davis, in Judge Dredd Mega-Special #7, 1994)
  - "Treasure of the Sierra Murder" (with Simon Davis, in Judge Dredd Megazine #2.63-2.66, 1994)
  - "Medicine Show" (with Jon Beeston, in Judge Dredd Megazine #2.81, 1995)
  - "Nightriders" (with Jamie Grant, in Judge Dredd Megazine #2.82-2.83, 1995)
  - "Mississippi Burning" (with Simon Davis, in Judge Dredd Megazine 3.01-3.03, 1995)
  - "Crusader" (with Charles Gillespie, in Judge Dredd Megazine #3.17, 1996)
  - "The Big Sleazy" (with Simon Davis, in Judge Dredd Megazine #3.18-3.20, 1996)
  - "The Shootist" (with Christian Bravery, in Judge Dredd Megazine #3.26-3.27, 1997)
  - "Juggernaut" (with Henry Flint, in Judge Dredd Megazine #3.34, 1997)
  - "Storm Warnings" (with Trevor Hairsine, in Judge Dredd Megazine #3.38, 1998)
  - "The Promised Land" (with Trevor Hairsine, in 2000 AD #1177, 2000)
  - "Missionary Man: Prologue" (with Simon Davis, in 2000 AD #1091, 1998)
  - "Mardi Gras" (with Alex Ronald, in 2000 AD #1092-1096, 1998)
  - "Goin' South" (with Alex Ronald, in 2000 AD #1118-1123, 1998)
  - "Apocrypha" (with Henry Flint, in 2000 AD #1124, 1998)
  - "The Promised Land" (with Alex Ronald (1-3, 8-9), Trevor Hairsine (4), Colin MacNeil (5-7), Simon Davis (10-12), and Dean Ormston (13-15), in 2000 AD #1174-1188, 2000)
  - "Mark of the Beast" (with Jesus Redondo, in 2000 AD #1201-1204, 2000)
  - "Silence" (with Wayne Reynolds, in Judge Dredd Megazine #3.77, 2001)
  - "Place of the Dead" (with John Ridgway, in Judge Dredd Megazine #4.9-4.13, 2002)
- Judge Dredd:
  - "Do the Wrong Thing" (with Paul Peart, in Judge Dredd Megazine #2.49 1994)
  - "Lethal Response" (with Mike Perkins, in Judge Dredd Yearbook 1995, 1994)
  - "Get Me to the Church on Time" (with Pete Venters, in Judge Dredd Megazine #3.01, 1995)
  - "Zero Tolerance" (with Enric Rebollo, in Judge Dredd Megazine #3.31-3.32, 1997)
  - "Rest Stop" (with Chris Weston, in 2000 AD #1194, 2000)
  - "The Big Lie" (with Steve Parkhouse, in 2000 AD #1224, 2001)
  - "Sino-Town" (with PJ Holden, in 2000 AD #1233, 2001)
  - "Asylum" (with Frazer Irving, in Judge Dredd Megazine vol. 4 #5, 2001)
  - "Married with Juves" (with Adrian Bamforth, in 2000 AD #1262, 2001)
  - "Safe Hands" (with Jock, in 2000 AD #1273, 2002)
  - "A Right Royal Occasion" (with Peter Doherty, in 2000 AD #1293, 2002)
  - "Waiting" (with PJ Holden, in 2000 AD #1312, 2002)
  - "One of our simps is missing" (with Anthony Williams, in Judge Dredd Megazine #4.14, 2002)
  - "War Crimes" (with Lee Sullivan, in Judge Dredd Megazine #201, 2003)
  - "Sturm und Dang" (with Carlos Ezquerra, in Judge Dredd Megazine #211-212, 2003)
  - "Holding On" (with Ian Gibson, in 2000 AD #1357, 2003)
  - "Club Sov" (with Simon Fraser, in 2000 AD #1358, 2003)
  - "Bato Loco" (with Simon Coleby, in Judge Dredd Megazine #202, 2003)
  - "Meet the Flooks" (with PJ Holden, in 2000 AD #1359, 2003)
  - "See Zammy Run" (with Inaki Miranda, in 2000 AD #1360-1361, 2003)
  - "Gulag" (with Charlie Adlard, in 2000 AD #1382-1386, 2004)
  - "Last Respects" (with John McCrea, in 2000 AD #1389, 2004)
  - "Lazarus" (with Adrian Salmon, in Judge Dredd Megazine #217, 2004)
  - "Master Moves" (with D'Israeli, in Judge Dredd Megazine #217, 2004)
  - "(This is not a) Mega-City Love Story #1: Callista" (with Ben Willsher, in 2000 AD #1423, 2004)
  - "The Magnificent Umbersons" (with PJ Holden, in Judge Dredd Megazine #235, 2005)
  - "Visiting Hour" (with Anthony Williams, in 2000 AD #1423, 2005)
  - "The Searchers" (with Carl Critchlow, in 2000 AD #1424, 2005)
  - "Missing in action" (with Ian Gibson, in 2000 AD #1429-1431, 2005)
  - "Descent" (with Boo Cook, 2000 AD #1432-1436, 2005)
  - "Radstock" (with Karl Richardson, in 2000 AD #1437-1439, 2005)
  - "Blood Trails" (with Andrew Currie, in 2000 AD #1440-1449, 2005)
  - "Matters Of Life And Death" (with Carlos Ezquerra, in 2000 AD #1452, 2005)
  - "Burned Out" (with Carl Critchlow, in 2000 AD #1461 - Judge Dredd Megazine #238, 2005)
  - "Change of Loyalties" (with Henry Flint, in 2000 AD #1466, 2005)
  - "Global Psycho" (with Ian Gibson, in 2000 AD #1468, 2005)
  - "Direct Action" (with Cam Kennedy, in 2000 AD #1477-1479, March 2006)
  - "Return to Planet Gary" (with Ian Gibson, in 2000 AD #1483, April 2006)
  - "Culling Time" (with Paul Marshall, in Judge Dredd Megazine #244, May 2006)
  - "Regime Change" (with Inaki Miranda, in Judge Dredd Megazine #246-249, June–September 2006)
  - "Fitness Test" (with Anthony Williams, in 2000 AD #1484, 2006)
  - "House of Pain" (with PJ Holden, in 2000 AD #1488-1490, 2006)
  - "Sanctuary" (with PJ Holden, in 2000 AD #1495, 2006)
  - "Judgement" (with Ian Gibson, in 2000 AD #1523-1528, 2007)
  - "Tartan Terrors" (with Jock, in 2000 AD #1540, 2007)
  - "Cit-Emp" (with Len O'Grady, in 2000 AD #1550, 2007)
  - "Trial by Dury" (with Paul Marshall, in 2000 AD #1552-1553, 2007)
  - "Test Flight" (with Colin MacNeil, in 2000 AD #1554, 2007)
  - "The Listener" (with Boo Cook, in Judge Dredd Megazine #265, 2007)
  - "The Menagerie" (with Paul Marshall, in Judge Dredd Megazine #267, 2008)
  - "Mind Games" (with Inaki Miranda, in Judge Dredd Megazine #269, 2008)
  - "Born to Zoosh" (with Nick Dyer, in 2000 AD #1634, 2009)
  - "Road Stop" (with Dave Taylor, in 2000 AD #1582-1586, 2008)
  - "It came from Bea Arthur Block" (with PJ Holden, in 2000 AD #1637-1639, 2009)
  - "Tour of Duty: Dragon's Den" (with Cliff Robinson (1-2) and PJ Holden (3-4), in 2000 AD #1668-1671, January–February 2010)
  - "The Connoisseur" (with Karl Richardson, in 2000 AD #1695-1697, July–August 2010)
  - "The Natural" (with Graeme Neil Reid, in Judge Dredd Megazine #301, September 2010)
  - "Persistent Vegetative State" (with Cliff Robinson, in 2000 AD #1726-1727, March 2011)
  - "Scream" (with Lee Carter, in 2000 AD #1737-1739, June 2011)
  - "Suicide Watch" (co-written with Emma Beeby, art by Paul Davidson and Chris Blythe, in 2000 AD #1826-1829, April 2013)
- Mean Machine:
  - "Psycho Analysis" (with Robert McCallum, in 2000AD Sci-Fi Special 1995)
  - "Mean Streets" (with Jim Murray, in Judge Dredd Mega-Special, 1996)
  - "Close Encounters of the Mean Kind" (with Anthony Williams, in 2000AD Sci-Fi Special 1996)
  - "Born Mean" (with Kev Walker, in Judge Dredd Megazine #3.69, 2000)
  - "The Geek" (with pencils by Paul Marshall and inks by Lee Townsend, in Judge Dredd Megazine #3.69, 2000)
  - "Support Yore Local Bastich" (with Wayne Reynolds, in Judge Dredd Megazine #3.69, 2000)
  - "The Last Vidshow" (with pencils by Patrick Goddard and inks by Lee Townsend, in Judge Dredd Megazine #3.69, 2000)
  - "Butt Me Deadly" (with pencils by Patrick Goddard and inks by Lee Townsend, in Judge Dredd Megazine #3.69, 2000)
- Harke & Burr: "Satanic Farces" (with co-writer Si Spencer and Dean Ormston, in Judge Dredd Megazine #3.04-3.07, 1995)
- Vector 13:
  - "Case Zero: Oath of Office" (with Garry Marshall, in 2000 AD #987, 1996)
  - "Case Five: Patent Pending" (with Mike Perkins, in 2000 AD #1028, 1997)
  - "Case Six: Bodysnatchers" (with Alex Ronald, in 2000 AD #1029, 1997)
  - "Case Eight: Unhallowed Ground" (with Allan Bednar as "Neal Brand", in 2000 AD #1031, 1997)
  - "Case Zero: Shadows and Light" (with Dylan Teague, in 2000 AD #1060, 1997)
  - "Case Six: MK-Ultra" (with Alex Ronald, in 2000 AD #1067, 1997)
  - "Case Eight: Midnight Rambler" (with Paul Johnson, in 2000 AD #1069, 1997)
  - "Case Eleven: Search & Rescue" (with Cliff Robinson, in 2000 AD #1072, 1997)
  - "Case Fifteen: Time's Arrow" (with Patrick Woodrow, in 2000 AD #1076, 1998)
  - "Case Four: Einstein's Monsters" (with Cyril Julien, in 2000 AD #1081, 1998)
  - "Case Five: Seal of Solomon" (with Alex Ronald, in 2000 AD #1082, 1998)
- Species: Human Race #1 (with pencils by Phil Hester and inks by Ande Parks, 4-issue mini-series, 1996–1997, Dark Horse, tpb, 1997, ISBN 1-56971-219-0)
- Witch World:
  - "The Dark Man" (with Siku, in 2000 AD #1050-1052, July 1997)
  - "Wolfshead" (with Paul Johnson, in 2000 AD #1053-1054, July–August, 1997)
  - "The Anatomist" (with Will Simpson, in 2000 AD #1055-1058, August–September 1997)
  - "Closing Shadows" (with John Burns, in 2000 AD #1059-1061, September 1997)
- Inferno!:
  - "Bloodquest" (with Colin MacNeil, in Inferno! #2, 1997)
  - "Rites of Passage" (short story, in Inferno! #4, 1998)
  - "Trespass" (with John Hicklenton, in Inferno! #8, 1998)
  - "Unearthed Remains" (with Simon Davis and Gordon Robson, in Inferno! #9, 1998)
- Starship Troopers: "Insect Touch" #2-3 (with co-writer Warren Ellis with art by Davide Fabbri and Paolo Parente, 4-issue mini-series, 1997, Dark Horse, collected in Starship Troopers, 1998, ISBN 1-56971-314-6)
- Bloodquest: Eye of Terror Trilogy (with Colin MacNeil, Black Library, 256 pages, 2005, ISBN 1-84416-146-3) collects:
  - Bloodquest (104 pages, 1999, ISBN 1-84154-108-7)
  - Bloodquest: Into the Eye of Terror (54 pages, 2001, ISBN 1-84154-126-5)
  - Bloodquest: The Daemon's Mark (96 pages, 2003, ISBN 1-84416-057-2)
- Tharg's Terror Tales (with Frazer Irving):
  - "Reefer Madness" (in 2000 AD #1263, 2001)
  - "Mars Needs Mates!" (in 2000 AD #1285, 2002)
  - "Monsters of Rock" (in 2000 AD #2004, 2003)
- Pulp Sci-Fi:
  - "Night Shift" (with Dylan Teague, in 2000 AD #1131, 1999)
  - "Buzz Tycho's Last Stand" (with Charlie Adlard, in 2000 AD #1146, 1999)
  - "Surgical Strike" (with Trevor Hairsine, in 2000 AD #1148, 1999)
  - "Reapermen" (with Jock, in 2000 AD #1170, 1999)
  - "Chronvicts" (with Siku, in 2000 AD #1172, 1999)
- Glimmer Rats (with Mark Harrison, in 2000 AD Prog 2000 & #1174-1182, 1999–2000, tpb, Rebellion Developments, 60 pages, hardcover, 2002, ISBN 1-904265-00-6)
- Rain Dogs (with Colin Wilson, in 2000 AD #1213-1222, 2000, tpb, Rebellion Developments, 52 pages, hardcover, 2002, ISBN 1-904265-01-4)
- Kal Jerico: Underhive Bounty Hunter (Necromunda series, Black Library, 176 pages, 2005, ISBN 1-84416-254-0) collects:
  - Kal Jerico (with Karl Kopinski, 54 pages, 2000, ISBN 1-84154-041-2)
  - Kal Jerico II: Contracts and Agendas (with Wayne Reynolds, 54 pages, 2001, ISBN 1-84154-209-1)
- Necronauts (with Frazer Irving, in 2000 AD Prog 2001 and #1223-1230, 2000–2001, tpb, 64 pages, 2003, ISBN 1-904265-09-X)
- Satanus Unchained! (with Colin MacNeil, in 2000 AD #1241-1246, 2001)
- ZombieWorld: "Home for the Holidays" (with Gary Erskine, one-shot, 1997, Dark Horse, collected in ZombieWorld: Winter's Dregs, 2005 ISBN 1-59307-384-4)
- Predator Omnibus: Volume 4 (352 pages, October 2008, ISBN 1-59307-990-7) collects:
  - "Nemesis" (with Colin MacNeil, two-issue mini-series, 1997)
  - "Captive" (with Dean Ormston, one-shot, 1998)
- Storming Heaven (with Frazer Irving, in 2000 AD Prog 2002 & # 1273-1278, 2001–2002)
- The Life and Time of Ulli & Marquand and Their Misadventures in Mordheim, City of the Damned (with Gavin Thorpe, Mike Perkins, and Karl Kopinski, Black Library, 80 pages, 2002, ISBN 1-84154-211-3)
- Rogue Trooper (collected in Realpolitik, 144 pages, February 2007, ISBN 1-904265-94-4):
  - "What lies beneath" (with pencils by Staz Johnson and inks by David Roach, in 2000 AD #1301-1304, 2002)
  - "Weapons of War" (with Dylan Teague, in 2000 AD #1305, 2002)
  - "Overkill" (with Simon Coleby, in 2000 AD #1306-1307, 2002)
  - "Lions" (with Staz Johnson (1308) and Mike Collins (1309), in 2000 AD #1308-1309, 2002)
  - "A Visit to the Boneyard" (with pencils by Mike Collins and inks by David Roach, in 2000 AD #1310-1311, 2002)
  - "Requiem" (with Simon Coleby, in 2000 AD #1312, 2002)
  - "Angels" (with Simon Coleby, in 2000 AD Prog 2003, 2002)
  - "Ghouls" (with Staz Johnson (1344–1347) and Mike Collins (1348-1349), in 2000 AD #1345-1349, 2003)
  - "Realpolitik" (with PJ Holden, in 2000 AD #1380-1385, 2004)
  - "Condor Six Down" (with Simon Coleby, in 2000 AD #1462-1464, 2005)
- Past Imperfect:
  - "Infamy" (with pencils by Mike Collins and inks by Lee Townsend, in 2000 AD #1316, 2002)
  - "The Red Menace" (with pencils by Adrian Bamforth and inks by Lee Townsend, in 2000 AD #1318, 2002)
- Caballistics, Inc. (with Dom Reardon):
  - "Going Underground" (in 2000 AD #1322-1326, 2002)
  - "Moving In" (in 2000 AD #1331-1333, 2003)
  - "Breaking Out" (in 2000 AD #1337-1340, 2003)
  - "Downtime 1 - Chapter" (in 2000 AD #1363, 2002)
  - "Downtime 2 - Verse" (in 2000 AD #1364, 2002)
  - "Downtime 3 - Ness" (in 2000 AD #1365, 2003)
  - "Downtime 4 - Jonathan & Jennifer" (in 2000 AD #1366, 2003)
  - "Downtime 5 - Ravne" (in 2000 AD #1367, 2003)
  - "Downtime 6 - Kostabi" (in 2000 AD #1368, 2003)
  - "Krystalnacht" (in 2000 AD Prog 2004, 2003)
  - "Picking Up The Pieces" (in 2000 AD #1400, 2004)
  - "Creepshow" (in 2000 AD #1401-1408, 2004)
  - "Weird War Tales" (in 2000 AD Prog 2005, 2004)
  - "Northern Dark" (in 2000 AD #1443-1448, 2005)
  - "Strange Bedfellows" (in 2000 AD Prog 2006, 2005)
  - "Changelings" (in 2000 AD #1469-1474, 2006)
  - "Ashes" (in 2000 AD #1551-1558, 2007)
  - "The Nativity" (in 2000AD Prog 2008, 2007)
- Bato Loco:
  - "True Romance" (with Simon Coleby, in Judge Dredd Megazine #208, 2003)
  - "Head Job" (with Simon Coleby, in Judge Dredd Megazine #229-230, 2005)
  - "Kiss Me Deadly" (with Andrew Currie, in Judge Dredd Megazine #290-291, 2009)
- Daemonifuge: Judgement of Tears (with Kev Walker and Karl Richardson, Black Library, 88 pages, 2003, ISBN 1-84154-240-7)
- Whatever Happened To?:
  - "Maria" (with Graham Manley, in Judge Dredd Megazine #215, 2004)
  - "John 'Giant' Clay" (with Rufus Dayglo, in Judge Dredd Megazine #216, 2004)
  - "Conrad Conn" (with Carlos Trigo, in Judge Dredd Megazine #218, 2004)
  - "The Gribligs" (with Steve Roberts, in Judge Dredd Megazine #219, 2004)
- Deff Skwadron (with Paul Jeacock, Black Library, 64 pages, 2003, ISBN 1-84416-069-6)
- Cursed Earth Koburn (with Carlos Ezquerra):
  - "Kuss Hard" (in Judge Dredd Megazine #221-223, 2004)
  - "Burial Party" (in Judge Dredd Megazine #228, 2005)
  - "The Assizes" (in Judge Dredd Megazine #239, 2005)
  - "Malachi" (in Judge Dredd Megazine #240-144, 2006)
- Johnny Woo:
  - "A Bullet In The Head" (with PJ Holden, in Judge Dredd Megazine #231-233, 2005)
  - "A Hong Tong Ghost Story" (with PJ Holden, in Judge Dredd Megazine #298-299, 2010)
- The 86ers:
  - "Touchdown" (with art by Karl Richardson (1-2), drawing by PJ Holden (3-6) and colours by Chris Blythe (3-6), in 2000 AD #1480-1485, 2006)
  - "Interference" (with PJ Holden, in 2000 AD #1508-1510, 2006)
  - "Walking to Eternity" (with PJ Holden, in 2000 AD Prog 2007, 2006)
- Absalom (with Tiernan Trevallion):
  - "Noblesse Obligie" (in 2000 AD #1732-1739, May–June 2011)
  - "Sick leave" (in 2000 AD Prog 2012, December 2011)
  - "Ghosts of London" (in 2000 AD #1765-1771, January–February 2012)

=== Novels ===
Novels include:
2000 AD

- Judge Dredd: Dredd Vs Death (Black Flame, October 2003, ISBN 1-84416-061-0)
- Rogue Trooper: Crucible (Black Flame, October 2004, ISBN 1-84416-061-0)

Warhammer

- Execution Hour (with Matthew Farrer, Games Workshop, August 2001, ISBN 0-7434-1165-X)
- Zavant (Games Workshop, March 2002, ISBN 0-7434-1174-9)
- Shadowpoint (Games Workshop, April 2003, ISBN 0-7434-4326-8)
- Blood Royal (with Will McDermott, Necromunda series, Black Library, August 2005, ISBN 1-84416-190-0)

=== Video games ===
- Killzone (script, 2004)
- Rogue Trooper (script 2006)
- Xi ("initial brainstorm writer", 2009)
- Splatterhouse (script, 2010)
- Aliens vs. Predator (script, 2010)
- Highlander: The Game (cancelled 2010)
- Risen 2: Dark Waters (script with Emma Beeby & Alan Barnes, 2012)

== Awards ==
- 2004 Graphic Novel of the Year, Diamond Comics Awards (for Necronauts)
- 2006 Screenplay (video games), BAFTA nomination for writing the script for the Rogue Trooper game
