= Northlanders =

American comic book series

- Cover to issue #1 of Northlanders (December 2007), art by Massimo Carnevale.

Publication information
- Publisher: Vertigo
- Schedule: Monthly
- Format: Ongoing series
- Genre: Historical
- Publication date: February 2008 – April 2012
- No. of issues: 50

Creative team
- Created by: Brian Wood
- Written by: Brian Wood
- Artist(s): Davide Gianfelice; Massimo Carnevale; Dean Ormston; Ryan Kelly; Vasilis Lolos; Danijel Žeželj; Leandro Fernández
- Letterer: Travis Lanham
- Colorist(s): Dave McCaig; Dean Ormston
- Editor(s): Mark Doyle; Will Dennis; Casey Seijas

Collected editions
- Sven the Returned: ISBN 1401219187
- The Cross + the Hammer: ISBN 140122296X

Northlanders is an American comic book series published by DC Comics under their Vertigo imprint. The stories are fictional but set in and around historical events during the Viking Age.

Northlanders is written by Brian Wood, illustrated by various artists on a per storyline basis, and with painted cover art by Massimo Carnevale. The first issue of the series was published on December 5, 2007.

The series was canceled by Vertigo on April 11, 2012, at issue #50.

== Plot ==
Northlanders alternates long and short story arcs, each of which deals with a different protagonist in a different time period within the Viking Age.

The first story arc, "Sven the Returned", runs through issues #1–8 and is set in A.D. 980. It follows a self-exiled Viking warrior named Sven who has been serving in the Byzantine Varangian Guard, and is now returning to his birth region in the Orkney Islands in order to reclaim his rightful inheritance.

The second arc, "Lindisfarne", runs through issues #9 and 10, and is about a young boy and the sacking of the Lindisfarne monastery in A.D. 793, the beginning of the Viking Age.

The third arc, "The Cross + The Hammer", runs through issues #11–16 and is set around Dublin, Ireland circa the Battle of Clontarf, which took place in A.D. 1014; it deals with the pursuit of an Irishman and his daughter who attacks the occupying Viking forces using guerrilla tactics.

== Collected editions ==
The series was collected into trade paperbacks:

Northlanders trade paperbacks
#	Title	ISBN	Release date	Collected material	Artists
1	Sven the Returned	ISBN 1-4012-1918-7	October, 2008	Northlanders #1–8, "Sven the Returned"	Davide Gianfelice
2	The Cross + the Hammer	ISBN 1-4012-2296-X	July, 2009	Northlanders #11–16, "The Cross + the Hammer"	Ryan Kelly
3	Blood in the Snow	ISBN 1-4012-2620-5	March, 2010	Northlanders #9–10, "Lindisfarne"; Northlanders #17, "The Viking Art of Single Combat"; Northlanders #18–19, "The Shield Maidens"; Northlanders #20, "Sven, the Immortal"	Davide Gianfelice, Vasilis Lolos, Dean Ormston, Danijel Žeželj
4	The Plague Widow	ISBN 1-4012-2850-X	October, 2010	Northlanders #21–28, "The Plague Widow"	Leandro Fernández
5	Metal	ISBN 1-4012-3160-8	July, 2011	Northlanders #29, "The Sea Road"; Northlanders #30–34, "Metal", Northlanders #35–36, "The Girl In The Ice"	Fiona Staples, Riccardo Burchielli, Becky Cloonan
6	Thor's Daughter	ISBN 1-4012-3366-X	February, 2012	Northlanders #37–39, "The Siege of Paris"; Northlanders #40, "The Hunt"; Northlanders #41, "Thor's Daughter"	Simon Gane, Matthew Woodson, Marion Churchland
7	The Icelandic Trilogy	ISBN 1-4012-3691-X	January, 2013	Northlanders #42–50, "The Icelandic Trilogy"	Paul Azaceta, Declan Shalvey, Danijel Žeželj

Later also collected in the following paperback omnibus editions:

Northlanders omnibus editions
#	Title	ISBN	Release date	Collected material	Artists
1	Book I: The Anglo-Saxon Saga	ISBN 1-4012-6331-3	June, 2016	Northlanders #9–10, "Lindisfarne"; Northlanders #18–19, "The Shield Maidens"; Northlanders #1–8, "Sven the Returned"; Northlanders #41, "Thor's Daughter"; Northlanders #11–16, "The Cross + the Hammer"	Davide Gianfelice, Ryan Kelly, Dean Ormston, Marion Churchland, Danijel Žeželj
2	Book II: The Icelandic Saga	ISBN 1-4012-6508-1	November, 2016	Northlanders #29, "The Sea Road"; Northlanders #20, "Sven, The Immortal"; Northlanders #35–36, "The Girl In The Ice"; Northlanders #42–50, "The Icelandic Trilogy"	Fiona Staples, Danijel Žeželj, Becky Cloonan, Paul Azaceta, Declan Shalvey
3	Book III: The European Saga	ISBN 1-4012-7379-3	September, 2017	Northlanders #17, "The Viking Art of Single Combat"; Northlanders #21–28, "The Plague Widow"; Northlanders #30–34, "Metal"; Northlanders #37–39, "The Siege of Paris"; Northlanders #40, "The Hunt"	Vasilis Lolos, Leandro Fernández, Riccardo Burchielli, Simon Gane, Matthew Woodson

== Awards ==
- 2007: Nominated for the Eagle Award for "Favourite Comics Cover published during 2007" for cover of issue 1B by Adam Kubert
