= John McCrea (comics) =

Comic book artist from Northern Ireland

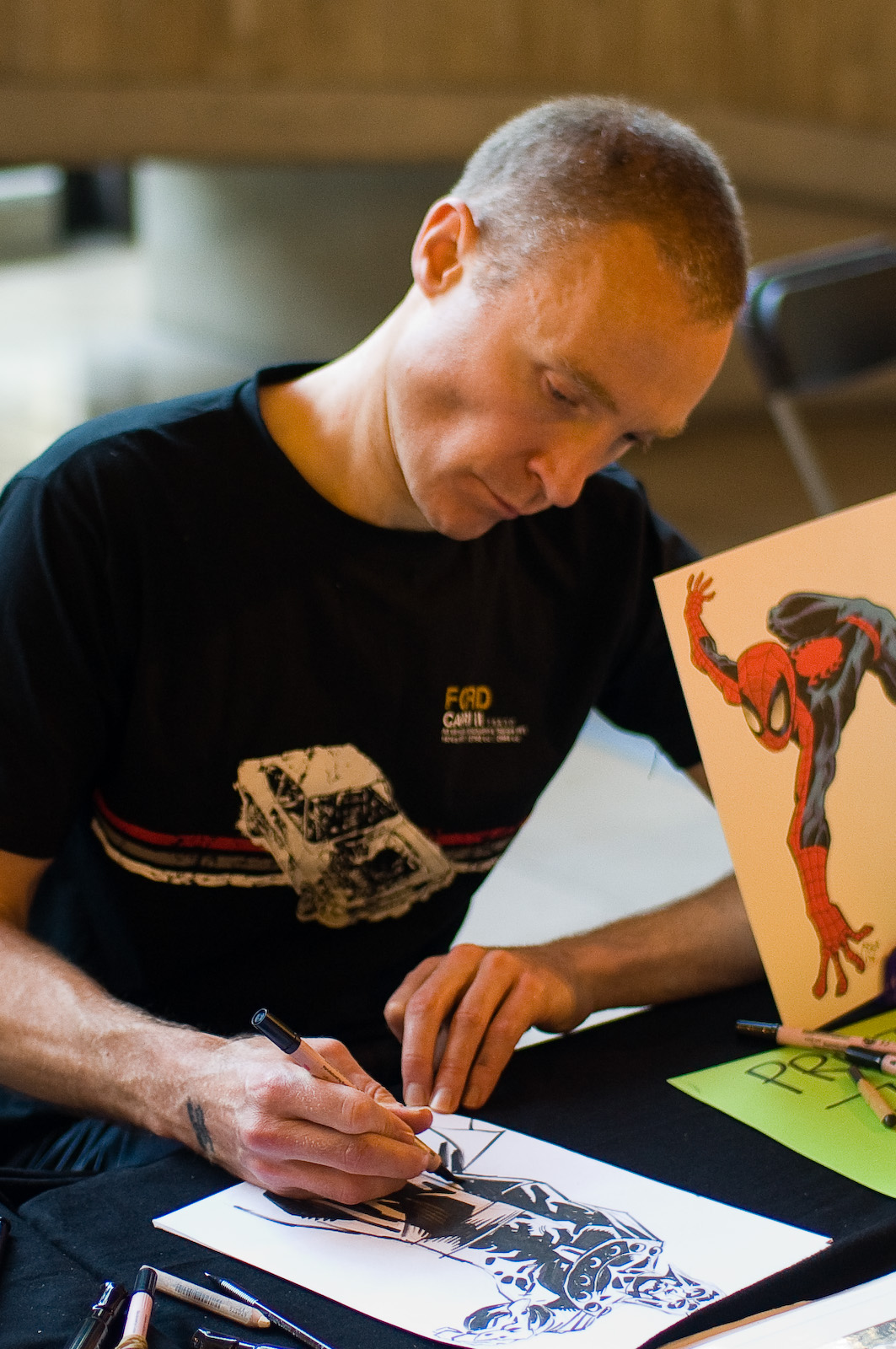
- McCrea at F.A.C.T.S. 2008
- Born: 1966 (age 59–60) Belfast, Northern Ireland
- Areas: Penciller, Inker
- Notable works: Hitman; The Boys (Herogasm, Highland Laddie, and Barbary Coast)

John McCrea (born 1966) is a Northern Irish comic book artist best known for his collaborations with writer Garth Ennis.

== Career ==
In 1989, after a few years of drawing television and toy tie-ins, he illustrated Ennis's debut, the political series Troubled Souls, in Crisis, as well as its sequel, the farce For a Few Troubles More. He later illustrated the series Carla Allison in Deadline.

John gained notoriety in American comics in 1993, drawing Ennis's run on DC Comics's The Demon, followed by its spin-off, Hitman, from 1996 to 2001, where McCrea developed his drawing style. Hitman issue 34 won the Eisner Award for Best Single Issue in 1999. His wilder, more exaggerated cartooning appeared in Dicks, a mini-series spinning off from For a Few Troubles More published by Caliber in 1997, and a sequel, Dicks II, from Avatar in 2002.

Since Hitman finished he has drawn a variety of characters for DC, Marvel, Dark Horse Comics, 2000 AD and others. Recent work includes Herogasm and Highland Laddie, limited series spun off from Garth Ennis' The Boys, and The Boys story arc Barbary Coast.

On 9 April 2011, McCrea was one of 62 comics creators who appeared at the IGN stage at the Kapow! convention in London to set two Guinness World Records, the Fastest Production of a Comic Book, and Most Contributors to a Comic Book.

In 2012, he started work on the Mars Attacks! 50th anniversary relaunch of the ongoing comic, written by John Layman and published by IDW. He also contributed 15 new cards to the Topps MA! Heritage set and exclusive variants for the set.

While pencilling and inking the MA! comic, he has also penciled and inked issue 49.1 of Deadpool for Marvel, Warpaint (written by Phil Hester) for UK based Strip Magazine, and Progenitor (also written by Hester) for David Lloyd's Aces Weekly.

He returned to DC briefly in 2013 through their Vertigo imprint for an 8 pager (written by Neil Kleid) for their one shot Ghosts. He returned again, this time to mainline DC Comics, for miniseries Section 8, based on supporting characters of Hitman. Section 8 also marks his reunion with Hitman writer Garth Ennis and the team's return to the series.

== Bibliography ==
- "Fast Forward" (with Hilary Robinson, in 2000 AD No. 615, 1989)
- Troubled Souls (with Garth Ennis, in Crisis #15–27, 40 & 46, 1989–1990)
- "Wyrmwood" (with Malachy Coney, in Crisis No. 29, 1989)
- "Her parents" (with Mark Millar, in Crisis No. 31, 1989)
- Chopper: "Earth, Wind and Fire" (with Garth Ennis, in Judge Dredd Megazine #1.01–1.06, 1990)
- Judge Death: "Masque of the Judge, Death" (with Si Spencer, in Judge Dredd Mega-Special No. 4, 1991)
- Middenface McNulty: "Wan Man an' His Dug" (with Alan Grant and Tony Luke, in Judge Dredd Megazine #1.15–1.20, 1991–1992)
- Judge Dredd:
  - "The Craftsman" (with Garth Ennis, in 2000 AD No. 817, 1993)
  - "Last Respects" (with Gordon Rennie, in 2000 AD #1389, 2004)
  - "Placebo" (with Rufus Dog, in 2000 AD #1405, 2004)
  - "Harvey" (with John Wagner, in 2000 AD #2024-2029, 2017)
- The Demon #40,42–48,50,52–60 (with Garth Ennis, DC Comics, 1993–1995)
- Hitman (with Garth Ennis, 60 issues, DC, specials: Annual #1, issue #1,000,000, 1996–2001)
  - Hitman (tpb collects #1–3 + The Demon Annual No. 2 + Batman Chronicles No. 4, 1997 ISBN 1-56389-314-2)
  - 10,000 Bullets (tpb collects #4–8, 1998 ISBN 1-56389-404-1)
  - Local Heroes (tpb collects #9–14 + Annual No. 1, 1999 ISBN 1-56389-509-9)
  - Ace of Killers (tpb collects #15–22, 2000 ISBN 1-56389-614-1)
  - Who Dares Wins (tpb collects #23–28, 2001 ISBN 1-56389-718-0)
  - uncollected: 29–33, 1,000,0000, 34–60
  - Hitman/Lobo: That Stupid Bastich! (one-shot, 1999)
  - JLA/Hitman (2-issue mini-series, DC, 2007, ongoing)
- Dicks (with Garth Ennis, 1997–2005)
- Preacher Special; Tall in the Saddle (with Steve Dillon, one-shot, DC/Vertigo 1999)
- Cruel and Unusual (pencils, with authors Jamie Delano/Tom Peyer and inks by Andrew Chiu, Vertigo, 4-issue mini-series, 1999)
- Wonder Woman Annual vol. 2 #154–155 (with Doselle Young, DC, 2000)
- Superman 80-Page Giant: "How To Be A Super-Hero" (with Garth Ennis, DC, 1999)
- Jenny Sparks: The Secret History of the Authority (with Mark Millar, 5-issue mini-series, Wildstorm, 2000, ISBN 1-56389-769-5)
- Bart Simpson's Treehouse of Horror #7: "In Springfield, No-One Can Hear You Scream" (with Garth Ennis, 2001)
- "Trooper" (with Garth Ennis & Jimmy Palmiotti, in Star Wars Tales #10, 2001, collected in Star Wars Tales, Volume Three, Dark Horse Comics, 2003, ISBN 1-56971-836-9)
- The Monarchy (with Doselle Young, 12 issues, Wildstorm, 2001–2002)
- Superboy #92–100
- Spider-Man's Tangled Web #1–3: "The Coming of the Thousand" (with Garth Ennis, 2001, tpb, 2002 ISBN 0-7851-0803-3)
- Spider-Man: "Get Kraven" (pencils with Ron Zimmerman, and inks by James Hodgkins, 5 issues, Marvel, 2002)
- Hulk Smash! (with Garth Ennis, Marvel, 2 issues, 2001, collected in tpb Incredible Hulk Vol. 7: Dead Like Me, August 2004, ISBN 0-7851-1399-1)
- Sinister Dexter "Vircade" (with Dan Abnett, in 2000 AD #1431, 2005)
- The Atheist (with Phil Hester, Image Comics, 2005)
- The 99 (with Fabian Nicieza, Teshkeel Comics, 2007-ongoing)
- Theseus battling the Minotaur (one-shot, Lerner Publishing Group)
- The Boys: Herogasm, Highland Laddie, and Barbary Coast (with Garth Ennis, mini-series, Dynamite Entertainment, 2009-2011)

== Awards ==
- 1998 Eisner Award for Best Single Issue (for Hitman #34: Of Thee I Sing)

== Trivia ==
John McCrea also had a drawing of Toyah Willcox as a Judge printed in 2000AD for a Dredd readers' art page in prog 310.
