= Books of Magick: Life During Wartime =

Fantasy comic book series published by DC Comics

- Cover of Books of Magick: Life During Wartime #2, art by Frank Quitely. Pictured left to right Molly, Tim Hunter, Cat and Dog.

Publication information
- Publisher: Vertigo
- Schedule: Monthly
- Format: Ongoing series
- Publication date: 2004-2005
- No. of issues: 15

Creative team
- Created by: Neil Gaiman; Si Spencer
- Written by: Si Spencer
- Artist(s): Dean Ormston; Steve Yeowell; Duncan Fegredo
- Letterer: Todd Klein

Collected editions
- Book 1: ISBN 1-4012-0488-0

Books of Magick: Life During Wartime is a fantasy comic book series published by DC Comics under their Vertigo imprint in 2004 and 2005 that was discontinued after fifteen issues.

The series was co-authored as a collaborative work from an story created by Neil Gaiman with issues written by Si Spencer, with Neil Gaiman also actively providing consultation during the creative process of the script. The artwork is done solo by Dean Ormston throughout most of the series' run. Steve Yeowell is co-credited as an artist in issues eleven and twelve and Duncan Fegredo fully replaces Ormston for issues six and ten.

The series depicts the events that take place on two fictional worlds, both of which are connected through an alternate version of the character Timothy Hunter.

When Timothy Hunter first appeared he was a young boy who had the potential to be the world's most powerful magic user. He starred in his own series titled The Books of Magic. Over the course of the character's history he changed and aged.

The idea behind Books of Magick: Life During Wartime was to present a more mature version of The Books of Magic without the character's past continuity attached. During the planning stage a problem appeared. A series of books based on the comics and also titled The Books of Magic had been released and marketed in this form to children. Books of Magick: Life During Wartime depicts nudity and sex, as well as a higher degree of violence than The Books of Magic. Although tastefully depicted these things make it a series inappropriate for children and there were fears that the new series and the books could be confused in some sectors. The decision to change 'Magic' to 'Magick' and to add the words 'Life During Wartime' was made and the series went forward.

== Setting ==
The true Earth of this series is a world upon which humans (known as the Bred) live side-by-side with members of the races of Faerie (known as the Born). It is a world torn by war. On one side is the ruling elite made exclusively of Born. On the other is the Coalition made up of both Born and Bred. The majority on both sides are members of the same religion. They worship Tim Hunter as a god under the name The Hunter.

The second Earth is known as Hunter's World and was created by Hunter as a means of protection and escape. The things he was running from were magic, war, and religion. As a result, when he created Hunter's World none of those things existed there.

== Publication history ==
The first five issues detail the current status quo in the final days of the war. The Born make their final attack and the war ends in issues seven to nine. Issues eleven to fifteen show the aftermath of these events with eleven and twelve dealing with the true Earth and thirteen, fourteen and fifteen showing the fate of Hunter's World and the main cast of characters. These three sections are separated by two one issue stories that show events from the perspective of two supporting characters. Issue six shows Dog's perspective while issue ten deals with Cat's.

== Characters ==
- Tim Hunter is the most powerful magic user on the real Earth. He is worshiped as a god, but hates it. He only wants the war to stop.
- John Constantine and Zatanna are two of Tim's closest friends and key players around which events move. These two characters are based on the DC Universe characters of the same names (John Constantine and Zatanna).
- Molly is Tim's girlfriend on Hunter's World.
- Cat and Dog are brother and sister and Tim's close friends on Hunter's World.
- Brewster is the only other person living on Hunter's World not created by Tim. His mission is to safeguard Tim for the Coalition and to ensure his memory of the real world returns when it needs to.
- Lord Midian is a Faerie and one of the leaders of Coalition. He is in charge of the Coalition's Navy.
- The Faerie Queen is the leader of the Born and rules over Earth from her palace in Jerusalem.

== Plot synopsis ==
=== The Beginning of the End ===
The series starts fifteen months into the war between the Born and the Coalition.

On the real world John Constantine finds himself in charge of the besieged city of Kraków. The forces inside are surrounded by the soldiers of the Born under the command of a monstrous Faerie known as The Cherish, and the food stores ran out seven months previously. In Jerusalem Zatanna searches for a way to obtain the three keys that will give her access to the Books of Magick. Her hope is that the books will allow Tim Hunter to regain all of his memories when he comes back from his exile.

Things get worse for the Coalition when an apparition of the Hunter appears worldwide. Seeing this the Coalition launches its naval fleet from Reykjavík to attack England (known as Albion on this world) despite the misgiving of Lord Midian. This turns out to be a disastrous move when the fleet is destroyed by giant wood golems guarding the landing beaches. In Kraków things get much worse when the forces surrounding the city begin launching deadly cluster spells. On top of all of this Zatanna is captured in Jerusalem and tortured. The pain of this last event is lessened when Zatanna escapes taking the three keys to the Books of Magick with her. The apparition also allows the Faerie Queen to discover Tim's location. She sends her agents, the Micturides to get him.

On Hunter's World, Tim meets his girlfriend Molly at the train station. Later they meet with their friends Cat and Dog who give Tim a book named The Books of Magick. After looking through it he collapses and sees a vision of the real world. While in the middle of this vision he inadvertently causes the apparition that appeared there.

This event causes Brewster to make his presence known. He introduces himself a few days later and enters Tim's circle of friends. Brewster begins to take actions that are designed to force Tim to use his powers and to remember magic again.

Strange things begin to happen around Tim at this point. These culminate when Cat gets hit in the head by a broken stone. Her eyes turn solid red and insects begin to exit her mouth. Tim drives to the oceanside and submerges her and himself in the water. The magic he uses in this location allows him to save her. While this is going on The Micturides arrive and are confronted by Brewster.

=== The Return of the Hunter ===
On the true Earth things are dark for the Coalition. The Born begin their invasion of Iceland (known as Thule on this world and the last nation still under Coalition control).

On Hunter's World Tim has regained enough of his memories to know who he is and where he comes from. He creates a church and has a funeral for Brewster who he believes was killed by the Micturides. In attendance are the very confused Molly, Cat and Dog. A very much still living Brewster arrives and begins to argue with Tim over Tim's actions. The argument grows heated and Tim's church is cracked in half. In the chaos Molly, Cat and Dog disappear only to appear in the real world. Molly appears to John Constantine in Kraków. Dog appears in Zatanna's shower in Jerusalem while she is taking a shower. Finally, Cat appears in front of a captured Lord Midian in Thule and is taken prisoner alongside the other Coalition survivors.

=== The War Ends ===
The Cherish on the cover of issue #9, art by Frank Quitely.

Tim arrives back in the real world along with Brewster. While deciding what to do they encounter a group of Alfar, a Faerie race known for eating other sentients, Tim begins a relationship with one of their women named Birgit. After coming to a decision on what his actions should be Tim transports his allies to the prison in Thule where Cat and Midian are being held. They rescue Cat but Midian dies from wounds he received while being tortured.

While Tim is in Thule, The Cherish gives the order to begin the final assault on Kraków. Tim and his allies teleport in not long after that order is given. In the battle Birgit is killed and Tim challenges the Cherish to one on one combat. The head of the Cherish's conjoined twin is cut off by one of her own soldiers just as she is about to kill Tim. This soldier is a worshiper of the Hunter and did not wish to see his god killed. This small victory is not enough to save the day as the forces of the Born overwhelm the city's defenders and the war comes to a conclusion.

=== Confronting the Queen ===
Tim, Molly, Constantine and Cat are taken as prisoners to Jerusalem where they are placed in chains at the head of a victory parade led by The Cherish. The spectacle winds its way through the streets on its way to the Queen's palace.

Seeing this Zatanna and Dog hatch a plan to steal the last of the Books of Magick. Slipping into the palace they quickly make their way to the room containing the last book. Just as they are about to take the book the soldiers assigned to guard the book discover their presence.

In the Queen's throne room, Tim and his allies are presented to the Queen. Tim casts an illusionary spell that distracts the Queen long enough to allow an escape. Constantine leads this small group through the palace halls to where Zatanna and Dog are fighting. Now joined, Tim and his allies take the last of the books and fight their way to a place of temporary safety. There Tim assembles all four books and casts the spell that will give him all of his memories back.

The spell fails and the Faerie Queen appears in the doorway. John Constantine goes to her and they embrace. He reveals that he is her lover, that he has been working for the Born the entire time and that the two of them destroyed the true Books of Magick months previously. As The Queen prepares to kill Tim and end any threat to her reign, Tim joins hands with Molly, Cat and Dog and casts a spell. Tim's three friends from Hunter's World crumble before his eyes and disappear. The effect on the Faerie Queen is similar as she dies and takes on the appearance of a desiccated corpse.

Seeking to see the Queen's true appearance Zatanna turns the corpse over only to see a feminine version of Tim's face. Constantine reveals that she was an alternate version of Tim and both he and Zatanna reveal to Tim that Constantine's actions were a double cross. Constantine's plan was to trick the Queen into allowing a small group close enough that she could be killed.

=== The Final Fate of Hunter's World ===
Since Tim's return to the true world, the social situation on Hunter's World has deteriorated. Tim returns with Brewster and is shocked to find that the strange events that preceded his departure have caused a religion to form. In a reflection of the true world this religion worships Tim as a deity under the name The Hunter.

This world has its own version of John Constantine named Jackie Constantine, who works as a delivery girl. Her assignment is to take a small package to the church that Tim created. Since Tim's leavetaking it has become the center of the new religion and the home for its leaders, the Holy Six. Jackie's delivery goes wrong and she barely gets away with her life.

Jackie is fired and now jobless she rescues a young woman from Hunter worshippers who were about to burn her at the stake. The young woman's name is Charlotte and the two of them become lovers. Later Jackie encounters a woman running from some more Hunter worshippers and saves her as well. This woman turns out to be the woman that Tim created on Hunter's World to be his "mother". This rescue leads to an encounter with Molly, Dog and Cat who have recently reappeared back on Hunter's World. The three of them and Brewster have a mission for her.

Tim has decided to destroy Hunter's World and Jackie is sent to talk to him in hopes that she can talk him out of it. She fails at this and Hunter's World ceases to exist. The only survivors are Jackie, Charlotte, Tim's "Mother", Dog, Cat and Molly. Along with Brewster, Tim transports this group to another realm using two cabins from the Hunter's World version of the London Eye.

This new world is a place of lush green beauty free from predators. Tim tells Cat and Dog that they are not really brother and sister and that they will be this dimension's Adam and Eve.

Tim takes the rest of his group to the Realm of Faerie to drop off Brewster and to have a talk with Titania, the Queen of Faerie (not to be confused with the foe he defeated). Molly and Tim's "mother" wander, see what Faerie is like and decide to stay.

Jackie and Charlotte travel with Tim to the true Earth. There Tim uses his powers to set them up in a new life.

== Reception ==
Although most of the reviews were favorable, there was some criticism. Most of this centered around the thought that, despite the fact that the story had no connection to the history of Timothy Hunter, you still needed to know that history to fully understand many plot details. A review from TheForthRail.com complained that "the writers seem to assume that the reader will be familiar with Tim's history".

== Collected editions ==
There has been one trade paperback collection so far:

- Books of Magick: Life During Wartime: Book 1 (with Dean Ormston, Vertigo, tpb collects #1-5, 2005, ISBN 1-4012-0488-0)
