= The Vinyl Underground =

Comic

Publication information
- Publisher: Vertigo
- Schedule: Monthly
- Format: Ongoing series
- Genre: Crime
- Publication date: December 2007 – November 2008
- No. of issues: 12

Creative team
- Artist: Si Spencer
- Penciller: Simon Gane
- Inker(s): Cameron Stewart; Ryan Kelly
- Letterer: Jared K. Fletcher
- Colorist: Guy Major
- Editor(s): Shelly Bond; Angela Rufino

Collected editions
- Watching the Detectives: ISBN 1-4012-1812-1
- Pretty Dead Things: ISBN 1401219772

The Vinyl Underground is a comic book series published by the Vertigo imprint of DC Comics, created and written by Si Spencer with art by Simon Gane. The title debuted in October 2007 and ran for twelve issues before its cancellation in September 2008.

== Overview ==
=== Background ===
Unveiled at the San Diego ComiCon in 2007 by Vertigo's Karen Berger as "'yet another' good Vertigo book about England", The Vinyl Underground is described by its author, Si Spencer as "a love–hate story about the streets [of London] that shaped its characters, and that shaped its author". Spencer—who was the writer for TV series EastEnders—credited London, his "adopted home now for ten years", with "[t]wo thousand years of violence [which] have shaped its streets" as well as fiction set within them. Spencer wrote in the Vertigo column "On the Ledge" that the city "constantly barg[ed] into the story uninvited", informing in the process the "right narrative voice" for the Vinyl Underground series.

Illustrator Simon Gane described the title as "scary, glamorous, fun, dark and articulate", while fellow-artist Andi Watson noted that Gane's work "[i]s a bit saucy" but also "hard to draw". Gane's work on The Vinyl Underground was deliberately drawn "in a more realistic style" than his usual (self-described as "warped") work, which move he felt "[had] a constructive effect on my drawing and story-telling".

The first issue was released on October 3, 2007 (cover-dated December) featuring cover art by Sean Phillips. Gane summarized the series as being "set in London and featur[ing] an ad-hoc group of self-appointed detectives who become embroiled in occult-tinged crimes with a strong supporting cast of mobsters and so on". Spencer stressed that it was "not just a detective thriller about a bunch of graduates hanging out in an abandoned underground station investigating occult crime", but also featured the city of London as a major 'character'. Publisher Vertigo described the series as a "fast-paced, ultra-cool ongoing crime-noir series", featuring "an unlikely quartet of occult detectives secretly solv[ing] crimes — from DJ crack bars in Camden to the elegant, high-society ballrooms that make up modern London".

=== Characters ===
The four-man group is led by minor celebrity DJ Morrison Shepherd, the "son of an ex-footballer" recently released from prison. Shepherd is aided by Perv (Callum O'Connor), an ex-con clairvoyant "whose seizures give him clues to crimes long before the cops", Leah King, a morgue assistant who moonlights as an internet model/pornstar, and Shepherd's ex-girlfriend Kim "Abi" Abiola, an "African tribal Princess in exile" whose witchdoctor father is accused of the murder which becomes the group's first mystery. Abi is also described by Spencer as "an expert in the psycho-geography of London", a theme which has also informed the works of writers Alan Moore, Iain Sinclair and Will Self, among others.

Living in an abandoned Underground station, the group investigates occult crimes in a manner evocative of fellow-Vertigo character John Constantine, providing anonymous tip-offs to the police force through D.S. Caulfield.

== Collected editions ==
The series has been collected into a couple of trade paperbacks:

- Watching the Detectives (collects #1–5, 128 pages, Vertigo, June 2008, ISBN 1-4012-1812-1)
- Pretty Dead Things (collects #6–12, 128 pages, Vertigo, Dec 2008, ISBN 1-4012-1977-2)
