= Harke & Burr =

Harke & Burr are two fictional comic book characters who appeared in their own stories for thirteen episodes in issues of British comic Judge Dredd Megazine. The majority of the Harke & Burr stories were written by Si Spencer and drawn by Dean Ormston. Gordon Rennie co-wrote one story and Paul Peart provided the artwork for another. The name is a Spoonerism based on infamous body-snatchers Burke and Hare who committed the West Port murders.

== Bibliography ==
They have only appeared in their own, eponymous strip:

- "Antique and Curious" (by Si Spencer and Dean Ormston, in Judge Dredd Megazine #2.27-2.28, 1993)
- "Hamster Horror" (by Si Spencer and Dean Ormston, in Judge Dredd Megazine #2.40-2.42, 1994)
- "Grief Encounter" (by Si Spencer and Dean Ormston, in Judge Dredd Megazine #2.47-2.49, 1994)
- "Secret Origin" (by Si Spencer and Paul Peart, in Judge Dredd Megazine #2.83, 1995)
- "Satanic Farces" (by Gordon Rennie/Si Spencer and Dean Ormston, in Judge Dredd Megazine #3.04-3.07, 1995)

The characters also make a cameo appearance in the Judge Dredd novel Cursed Earth Asylum, by David Bishop (Virgin Books, December 1993, ISBN 0-352-32893-2).

"Antique and Curious", "Hamster Horror" and "Grief Encounter" were reprinted as a giveaway with the 350th edition of the Judge Dredd Megazine in July.
