= Simon Gane =

British artist

- Born: U.K.
- Areas: Penciller, Artist
- Notable works: The Vinyl Underground; Ghost Tree

Simon Gane is a British artist from Bath known for his work in the comic book field.

Gane grew up influenced by the comics of Hergé and Jacques Tardi. He attended art school in the U.K. Later comics influences included Christophe Blain and Joann Sfar, as well as the minicomics of Tom Hart, David Lasky, and Adrian Tomine.

Gane's work was first published in his "self-produced punk fanzine, Arnie, and various minicomics before being collected in Punk Strips" (Slab-O-Concrete, 2000).

His first work published in the United States came in 2004 with Eureka Productions in Graphic Classics #9: Robert Louis Stevenson, and the kids' Godzilla comic, All Flee! (Top Shelf Productions). After illustrating the five-issue comic Paris, written by fellow Englishman Andi Watson and published by Slave Labor Graphics, Gane found a home with Vertigo Comics, first with The Vinyl Underground and then Dark Rain: A New Orleans Story and Northlanders. Gane described The Vinyl Underground as being "set in London and featur[ing] an ad-hoc group of self-appointed detectives who become embroiled in occult-tinged crimes with a strong supporting cast of mobsters and so on."

Gane is the official illustrator for the Burning Sky Brewery in East Sussex.

== Art style ==
Gane's work on The Vinyl Underground was deliberately drawn "in a more realistic style" than his usual (self-described as "warped") work, a move which he felt "[had] a constructive effect on my drawing and story-telling."

== Awards ==
- 2020 (nomination) Eisner Award for Best Penciller/Inker or Penciller/Inker Team for Ghost Tree (IDW Publishing)

== Bibliography ==
=== Comics ===
- (with Darryl Cunningham) Meet John Dark (Slab-O-Concrete, 1998)
- Punk Strips (Slab-O-Concrete, 2000)
- (with Michael Slack) Graphic Classics #9: Robert Louis Stevenson: two-part interpretation of Dr. Jekyll & Mr. Hyde (Eureka Productions, 2004)
- (with writer Gavin Burrows) All Flee! (Top Shelf Productions, 2004)
- (with writer Andi Watson) Paris, 5-issue limited series (Slave Labor Graphics, 2005–2006, tpb, 144 pages, August 2007, ISBN 1-59362-081-0)
- (with writer Si Spencer and inkers Cameron Stewart and Ryan Kelly) The Vinyl Underground #1–12 (Vertigo Comics, December 2007 – November 2008) collected as:
  - Watching the Detectives (collects #1–5, 128 pages, June 2008, ISBN 1-4012-1812-1)
  - Pretty Dead Things (collects #6–12, 128 pages, December 2008, ISBN 1-4012-1977-2)
- (with writer Alex Burrows) adaptation of Arthur Conan Doyle's "John Barrington Cowles," Graphic Classics: Free Comic Book Day #1 (Eureka Productions, 2008)
- (with writer Mat Johnson) Dark Rain: A New Orleans Story (Vertigo, August 2010 ISBN 978-1401221607)
- (with writer Brian Wood) Northlanders #37–39 (Vertigo, April–June 2011)
- (with writer Rob Williams) Think of a City page 20 (Internet art project, 2014)
- (with writer Eric Stephenson) They're Not Like Us (Image Comics, 2014-2017)
- (with writer Bobby Curnow) Ghost Tree #1–4 (IDW Publishing, 2019–2020)

=== Children's books ===
- (with Betty Hicks) Doubles Troubles (Macmillan Publishers, 2010)
- (with Betty Hicks) Track Attack (Macmillan, 2014)
