= Doselle Young =

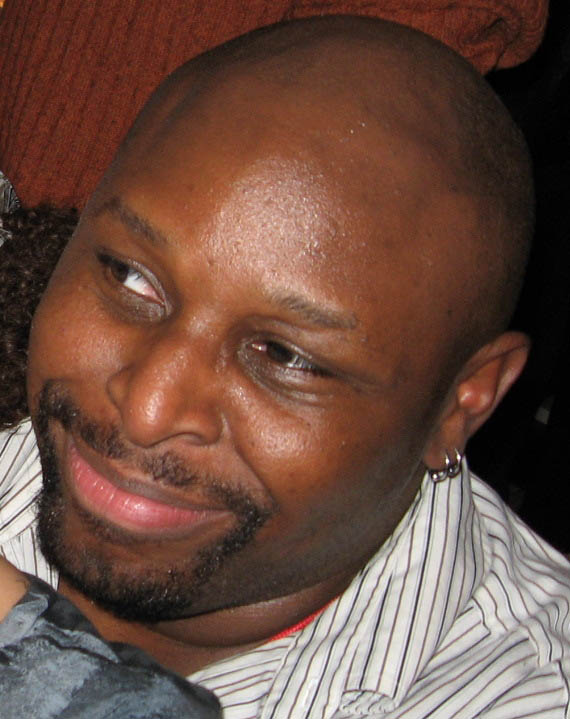
- Doselle Young at the 2007 World Fantasy Convention
- Area: Writer
- Notable works: The Monarchy; "Housework," in The Darker Mask (Tor Books, 2008) with illustration by Brian Hurtt.

Doselle Young is an American science fiction author, graphic novelist and contributor to both prose and comics anthologies.

== Biography ==
Doselle Young is a Los Angeles-based author, story consultant and graphic novelist. He has written stories for such iconic DC Comics characters such as Superman, Wonder Woman and The Authority. He is the author of the twelve-issue limited series The Monarchy (DC/Wildstorm) and has also contributed stories to DC Vertigo's critically acclaimed anthologies Gangland, Heartthrobs and Strange Adventures. In recent years, Doselle has split his creative output between comics, prose fiction and story consulting. His pulp-inspired tale "Housework" appears in the science-fiction/super hero anthology The Darker Mask (Tor/August 2008) while the noir-inspired "Raymond Chandler Slept Here" appears in the upcoming San Diego Noir (Akashic Books, July 2011). Doselle is the writer/creator of the upcoming comics series Perilous and a frequent panelist at science-fiction & comics conventions including ConFusion, PenguiCon, WisCON, San Diego Comic Con, World Con, World Fantasy Convention and LosCon. He has appeared as a guest blogger on author Justine Larbalestier's blog at JustineLarbalestier.com and can also be found on Twitter. A member of the Brights movement, Doselle is an atheist and an outspoken advocate for a naturalistic worldview based on scientific observation.

== Bibliography ==
Young has written for Tor Books, DC Comics' Vertigo and Wildstorm Productions imprints.

=== Comics ===
- Wonder Woman Annual vol. 2 #8, (1999)*
- Star Trek: Voyager - Avalon Rising (with co-author Janine Ellen Young and artist David Roach, graphic novel, Wildstorm, September 2000)*
- The Monarchy (illustrated by John McCrea and Garry Leach, Warren Pleece and Dean Ormston Wildstorm, April 2001 - May 2002)*

=== Comics anthologies ===
- "Your Special Day", in Gangland #1 illustrated by Frank Quitely.
- "Jericho", in Heartthrobs illustrated by Tony Salmons.
- "Driving Miss 134", in Strange Adventures illustrated by Ilya.
- "Upon Reflection", in"Creepy Comics" illustrated by Dean Ormston.

=== Prose anthologies ===
- "Housework", in The Darker Mask (Tor Books, 2008) with illustration by Brian Hurtt.
- "Raymond Chandler Slept Here", in "San Diego Noir" (Akashic Book, 2011).
