= Missionary Man (comics) =

- Cover of Judge Dredd Megazine vol. 2, 29 (29 May 1993), art by Frank Quitely
- Created by: Gordon Rennie; Frank Quitely; Garry Marshall

Publication information
- Publisher: Fleetway; Rebellion Developments
- Schedule: Monthly/Weekly
- Formats: Original material for the series has been published as a strip in the comics anthology(s) Judge Dredd Megazine and 2000 AD.
- Genre: Science fiction
- Publication date: May 1993 – July 2002
- Main character(s): Preacher Cain

Creative team
- Writer(s): Gordon Rennie
- Artist(s): Frank Quitely; Garry Marshall; Sean Longcroft; Simon Davis; Jon Beeston; Jamie Grant; Charles Gillespie; Christian Bravery; Henry Flint; Trevor Hairsine; Alex Ronald; Colin MacNeil; Dean Ormston; Wayne Reynolds; John Ridgway

Reprints
- Collected editions
- Missionary Man: ISBN 1-84023-465-2

Missionary Man is British comic strip. It debuted in the Judge Dredd Megazine in May 1993 with the introductory 7-page story "Salvation at the Last Chance Saloon", illustrated by Frank Quitely. It established that tall Preacher Cain rides the Cursed Earth performing "special sermons" in the radiation-poisoned towns, tutoring the damned with a bible and his guns. In this first outing, having educated and decimated a table of gambling mutant heavyweights he rides into the sunset, tossing a bible at the surviving townspeople - which contains a thermonuclear explosive.

In 1998 the strip transitioned to the weekly 2000 AD.

== Stories ==
All written by Gordon Rennie:

- Missionary Man:
  - "Salvation at the Last Chance Saloon" (with Frank Quitely, in Judge Dredd Megazine (vol. 2) #29, 1993)
  - "A Town Called Intolerance" (with Frank Quitely, in Judge Dredd Megazine (vol. 2) #30, 1993)
  - "Legend of the Unholy Drinker" (with Garry Marshall, in Judge Dredd Megazine (vol. 2) #43, 1993)
  - "Bad Moon Rising" (with Frank Quitely, in Judge Dredd Megazine (vol. 2) #50-55, 1994)
  - "Season of the Witch" (with Garry Marshall, in Judge Dredd Megazine (vol. 2) #56-57, 1994)
  - "Sanctuary" (with Sean Longcroft, in Judge Dredd Megazine (vol. 2) #58-59, 1994)
  - "The Undertaker Cometh" (with Simon Davis, in Judge Dredd Mega-Special #7, 1994)
  - "Treasure of the Sierra Murder" (with Simon Davis, in Judge Dredd Megazine (vol. 2) #63-66, 1994)
  - "Medicine Show" (with Jon Beeston, in Judge Dredd Megazine (vol. 2) #81, 1995)
  - "Nightriders" (with Jamie Grant, in Judge Dredd Megazine (vol. 2) #82-83, 1995)
  - "Mississippi Burning" (with Simon Davis, in Judge Dredd Megazine (vol. 3) #1-3, 1995)
  - "Crusader" (with Charles Gillespie, in Judge Dredd Megazine (vol. 3) #17, 1996)
  - "The Big Sleazy" (with Simon Davis, in Judge Dredd Megazine (vol. 3) #18-20, 1996)
  - "Night of the Hunter" (in Judge Dredd Megazine (vol. 3) #26, 1996)
  - "Mortal Combat" (in Judge Dredd Megazine (vol. 3) #27, 1996)
  - "Juggernaut" (with Henry Flint, in Judge Dredd Megazine (vol. 3) #34, 1997)
  - "The Shootist" (with Christian Bravery, in Judge Dredd Megazine (vol. 3) #36-37, 1997)
  - "Storm Warnings" (with Trevor Hairsine, in Judge Dredd Megazine (vol. 3) #38, 1998)
  - "Missionary Man: Prologue" (with Simon Davis, in 2000 AD #1091, 1998)
  - "Mardi Gras" (with Alex Ronald, in 2000 AD #1092-1096, 1998)
  - "Goin' South" (with Alex Ronald, in 2000 AD #1118-1123, 1998)
  - "Apocrypha" (with Henry Flint, in 2000 AD #1124, 1998)
  - "The Promised Land" (with Alex Ronald (1-3, 8-9), Trevor Hairsine (4), Colin MacNeil (5-7), Simon Davis (10-12), and Dean Ormston (13-15), in 2000 AD #1174-1188, 2000)
  - "Mark of the Beast" (with Jesus Redondo, in 2000 AD #1201-1204, 2000)
  - "Silence" (with Wayne Reynolds, in Judge Dredd Megazine (vol. 3) #77, 2001)
  - "Place of the Dead" (with John Ridgway, in Judge Dredd Megazine (vol. 4) #9-13, 2002)

The character also makes a cameo appearance in the Judge Dredd novel Cursed Earth Asylum, by David Bishop (Virgin Books, December 1993, ISBN 0-352-32893-2).

== Collected editions ==
Some of the stories have been collected into a number of trade paperbacks:

- Bad Moon Rising (112 pages, Rebellion Developments, August 2011, ISBN 1-907992-23-5) collects:
  - Missionary Man (80 pages, Titan Books, June 2002, ISBN 1-84023-465-2) collects:
    - "Salvation At The Last Chance Saloon"
    - "A Town Called Intolerance"
    - "Legend of the Unholy Drinker"
    - "Bad Moon Rising"
    - "Season of The Witch"
  - "Sanctuary"
  - "The Undertaker Cometh"
