= Black Siddha =

Black Siddha is a comic series created by Pat Mills and published in the British anthology Judge Dredd Megazine.

The story revolves around a super-powered Deva knight, Mardaka (literally "who crushes" or "who makes suffer"), who is "known and feared as the Black Siddha".

== Synopsis ==
Black Siddha centers on Rohan, a young Hindu British Asian, who is revealed to be a reincarnation of the titular character, a brutal warrior who enjoyed killing but nevertheless held to a chivalric code. Mardaka's superpowers are known as siddhas, and amongst others he has the siddhi of sky-striding and armoured skin. He fights using an Urumi, a double-edged flexible sword, although his has magical qualities.

== Bibliography ==
- Black Siddha (by Pat Mills and Simon Davis):
  - "Bad Karma" (in Judge Dredd Megazine #202-208, 2003)
  - "Kali Yuga" (in Judge Dredd Megazine #218-223, 2004)
  - "Return of the Jester" (in Judge Dredd Megazine #245-252, 2006)
