= Cruel and Unusual (comics) =

- Cover to Cruel and Unusual #1, art by John McCrea.

Publication information
- Publisher: Vertigo
- Format: Miniseries
- Publication date: June – September 1999
- No. of issues: 4

Creative team
- Created by: Jamie Delano; Tom Peyer; John McCrea
- Written by: Jamie Delano; Tom Peyer
- Penciller(s): John McCrea
- Inker(s): Andrew Chiu
- Letterer(s): Annie Parkhouse
- Colorist(s): Digital Chameleon; Tatjana Wood
- Editor(s): Cliff Chiang; Stuart Moore

Collected editions
- Cruel and Unusual: ISBN 0-9795939-2-1

Cruel and Unusual is a four-issue American comic book miniseries created in 1999 by Jamie Delano and Tom Peyer (writers), John McCrea (penciller) and Andrew Chiu (inker), and published by Vertigo.

== Synopsis ==
America's struggling prison system is turned over to TV producers, who exploit everything possible for profit, making reality shows of the prisoners and even hosting live executions.

== Collected editions ==
The series has been collected into a trade paperback:

- Cruel and Unusual (112 pages, softcover, Desperado Publishing, September 2007, ISBN 0-9795939-2-1)
- Cruel and Unusual (Italian language) (128 pages, hardcover, Green Comm Services, August 2013, ISBN 978-88-90788-51-2)
