= Bodies (comics) =

Detective fiction comic book series by Si Spencer

Publication information
- Publisher: Vertigo imprint of DC Comics
- Schedule: Monthly
- Format: Limited series
- Genre: Crime-thriller
- Publication date: July 2014 - February 2015
- No. of issues: 8

Creative team
- Created by: Si Spencer
- Written by: Si Spencer
- Artist(s): Dean Ormston; Phil Winslade; Meghan Hetrick; Tula Lotay
- Letterer(s): Dezi Sienty; Taylor Esposito; Sal Cipriano; Tom Napolitano
- Colorist(s): Lee Loughridge

Collected editions
- Trade paperback (first printing): ISBN 978-1-4012-5275-5
- Trade paperback: ISBN 9781779526977

Bodies is a detective fiction comic book series that follows London detectives across four time periods as they investigate the death of what appears to be the same man. It was created and written by Si Spencer, and a different artist rendered each era.

It was originally published as an eight-issue limited series by Vertigo, an imprint of DC Comics. It was first released in collected form in 2015 by Vertigo, and again in 2023 by DC Comics. A television adaptation of the same name premiered on Netflix in 2023.

== Plot summary ==
Detectives in 1890, 1940, 2014, and 2050 each find the body of a dead man in the middle of the fictional Longharvest Lane in the Whitechapel district of London. The body appears to belong to the same man in each time period, and to have been the victim of murder. The body has sustained several injuries, including the loss of an eye, burns, and a symbol resembling three tally marks with a horizontal slash branded onto its arm.

== Characters ==
=== 1890 ===
Detective Inspector Edmond Hillinghead, a young man whose department is also trying to apprehend Jack the Ripper.

=== 1940 ===
Detective Inspector Charles Whiteman, a Jewish man who escaped Poland after it was invaded by Nazis.

=== 2014 ===
Detective Sergeant Shahara Hasan, a Muslim woman of Persian descent born in England who faces racist rioters.

=== 2050 ===
Maplewood, a young woman detective with amnesia who has just survived a technological apocalypse.

== Reception ==
Broken Frontier named Bodies the best limited series of 2014, stating that "Spencer's energetic dialogue and narration [...] create a strong sense of time and place, backed up by the inspired choice of artist for each segment".

Comics Alliance published a positive review of the series, calling it "the most thought-provoking and unconventional mystery comic in years". An Asbury Park Press review was more tempered, saying that "Spencer doesn't always achieve everything he attempts with this particularly ambitious series, but Bodies is still more hit than miss".
