= Stone Island (comics) =

British comic strip

Publication information
- Publisher: Rebellion Developments
- Schedule: Weekly
Title(s)
2000 AD #1500-1507
2000 AD #1550-1559
- Formats: Original material for the series has been published as a strip in the comics anthology(s) 2000 AD.
- Genre: Horror
- Publication date: 2006

Creative team
- Writer(s): Ian Edginton
- Artist(s): Simon Davis
- Letterer(s): Ellie De Ville; Annie Parkhouse; Simon Bowland
- Editor(s): Tharg (Matt Smith)

Reprints
- Collected editions
- Stone Island: ISBN 1-905437-57-9

Stone Island is a horror series appearing in the British weekly comic 2000 AD. It is written by Ian Edginton, with art by Simon Davis.

The story is fully painted and is set in a prison called Long Barrow Maximum Security Prison where the main character, David Sorrel, has been sentenced to life, following the murder of his wife and her lover.

== Plot ==
David Sorrel has been sentenced to life in Long Barrow Maximum Security Prison on Dartmoor, following the murders of his wife and her lover, who are also beheaded. He is put in a cell with Harry Rivers, who tells him that he must some reputation and that he will be tested by some of the dangerous inmates as well. David is tested almost straight away when he bumps into Nathan Grice, who picks a fight with him. David wins it even though Grice cheats by using a small blade that he was carrying in his pocket, to cut his face a little.

David is dreaming about the night that he murdered his wife and her lover, in which he grins an insane smile, one which resembles the monster Grice's. His cellmate Harry Rivers wakes him up and David tells him about that particular night that got him locked away in the first place. He says that when he was arrested he could not tell the police a thing.

Hell is breaking loose in Long Barrow Prison as a guard runs through the blood-splattered corridors before being decapitated by one of the monsters. In the ventilation ducts, Harry and David watch. They are trying to find their way out of the prison and Harry seems to know where they are going, so David asks how. Harry tells him that he was allowed to write a book about the prison once, giving him access to the internet where he discovered facts about the ventilation system, cellars, and exits. They continue through the ducts when David stops him, realizing it is too quiet. Harry looks out of a vent only to find two of the creatures staring at him. Harry holds them off as David climbs higher up the ducts. Harry follows quickly and they decide to get out of the ducts but David is hit by a guard, mistaking him for one of the creatures.

David is having another flashback where it is revealed that the lover of David's wife is none other than his best friend. Outside the house, David is grabbed by some sort of claw. At the prison, the woman begs David to help her and Harry. David says that they should be grateful they are alive and says that David Sorrel no longer exists. He is The Light and the Way and is crucified inside out while the creatures experiment on him. Harry, on the other hand, undergoes a transformation just like the monsters themselves. He tells them about their origins and that his blood is what caused the infection. He died of a broken heart and has returned to unmake the world.

David reveals that there are more of the alien-like creatures in other places like prisons all over the world. He reveals that he only murdered his wife so he could get inside. Suddenly he feels pain and shouts to the aliens for air. Some kind of gas is revealed and it seems that the unknown woman is about to be killed by Grice. But luckily the horribly mutated Harry has managed to fight off the transformation and kills him with a pole and tells the woman to make a run for it.

=== The Harrowers ===
The story picks up some time after the events of the first story, with Sara living in a house near the destroyed prison. The "otherworlders" have broken into our world despite the incident at Longbarrow and appear to have changed, or at least there are different types of them. She is attacked by them, but Harry is protecting her but doesn't get there in time to save Sara's dog. Once Harry shows up and kills the last otherworlder.

Suddenly, they realise the Sheeny has transformed into a creature and is trying to wreck the bio-weapon they brought with them to try and kill the TDI's. They gun her down and then examine her body, discovering that "she" was a male transvestite. Briggs tells them that most of the damage it can be easily repaired. Harry and Walker throw themselves on the horde to slow them down, but Walker is killed and so is Harry. They reach the location where they arrived, and use a communicator scavenged of Carmody's remains to call home. The base refuse to open the gate because the risk is too great. The horde of creatures is getting closer, but Harry emerges from the, now missing an arm, rejoins the group.

He tells them that the Otherworld was created by extra-dimensional intelligence to try and force the creatures to evolve from their physical form to leave their Universe. However, the creatures degenerate instead of evolving and they find a physical way to leave rather than a metaphysical one. However, it turns out that human beings can make this evolutionary jump, and Sorrel tells them that he and the other light-beings will destroy all trace of mankind in the Otherworld to hide this fact from the extra-dimensional entities. He opens up a portal, but Harry chooses to remain in the Otherworld. Sorrel gives Sara a snow globe, to destroy all the creatures in the Universe. Sorrel confirms Harry's suspicion that he will have to be killed, to hide all evidence of mankind in the Otherworld, though he goes onto tell him he will probably become a light-being like himself.

== Characters ==
- David Sorrel has murdered his wife, who was cheating on him with another man. He has now been sent to Long Barrow Maximum Security Prison where he has made friends with Harry Rivers and a rivalry with Nathan Grice, who has now mutated into a monster.
- Harry Rivers is an older inmate of Long Barrow and has had David Sorrel thrown in his cell. Why he was imprisoned we are yet to find out. In his cell is an escape route behind a poster as in The Shawshank Redemption that has been used to escape from the mutilated monsters.
- Nathan Grice is one of Long Barrow's more dangerous inmates and has been in a fight with David Sorrel, in which he seems to have caught something causing him to turn into some sort of monster.
- George Fenton is the guard who first witnessed Grice's mutation and escaped his clutches. Now he seems to have suffered a complete mental breakdown and has attacked David and Harry, mistaking them for the monsters. Now he, Harry, David, Jon and Sara are preparing to escape from Long Barrow.
- Jon Prentiss is another guard who has survived the chaos along with Sara. We do not know if anything happened to him but we know that he is calm but seems to be taking orders from George.
- Sara McCandless is not named in the original, but is revealed as Sara in a later story. She seemed to appear with Jon after Sorrel and Harry escaped the prison into the outside area.
- The Light & the Way is the leader of "The Otherworld creatures". It also controls David Sorrel.

=== The Otherworld ===
According to "The Light & the way", "there is a thin, mean world that exists between life and death. They prey upon transitory souls like salmon spawning upstream". Split into drones, workers and warriors, the creatures of this world look like twisted zombies. Cramming their advanced technology into Sorrel when he died of Carbon monoxide poisoning to invade Earth, but failed when Jon Prentiss sacrificed himself.

== Publication ==
- Stone Island (by Ian Edginton and Simon Davis, collected as trade paperback, 112 pages, February 2008, ISBN 1-905437-57-9):
  - "Stone Island" (in 2000 AD #1500-1507, 2006)
  - "The Harrowers" (in 2000 AD #1550-1559, 2007)
