= American Reaper =

British science fiction comic strip

American Reaper is a British science fiction comic strip written by Pat Mills and illustrated by Clint Langley. It was serialised in the Judge Dredd Megazine from 2011, and has been optioned for a film by Steven Spielberg's Amblin Partners, for which Mills wrote the screenplay.

The story is set in New York in the year 2062. Wealthy but elderly criminals nearing the end of their lives kidnap teenagers in order to erase their minds and take over their bodies for a new lease of life. They are hunted down and killed by federal agents called Reapers.

== Publication ==
- First series: Megazine #316–321 (2011–2012)
- Second series: Megazine #332–337 (2013)
- Third series: Megazine #355–358 (2014–2015)

=== Reaper Files ===
Reaper Files was a series of short stories based in the same universe. These included art by Fay Dalton.

- "Tipping Point" #335
- "Buddy Holiday" #336
- "False Flag" #337
- "The Man Who Murdered Himself" #356
- "Happy Deathday, Detective Matherson" #359—360
