= Si Spencer =

British writer (1961–2021)

- Born: 1961 Sheffield, England
- Died: 16 February 2021 (aged 60)
- Areas: Writer, Editor
- Notable works: Books of Magick: Life During Wartime; The Vinyl Underground; Bodies

Si Spencer (1961 – 16 February 2021) was a British comic book writer and TV dramatist and editor whose work appeared in British comics such as Crisis. He often collaborated with Dean Ormston and later moved to the American comics industry.

== Biography ==
After starting in Crisis, he was signed up for the short-lived title Revolver, where two long series, 'Stickleback' and 'YoYo', were intended to run. The magazine folded before it saw print, however, and from 1993 to 1995 Spencer was a regular writer for the Judge Dredd Megazine and created characters such as Harke & Burr and The Creep as well as working on established characters (e.g. Judge Dredd). Spencer also edited comics and music magazine Deadline between 1991 and 1992.

In North America, his work has appeared primarily in series published by DC Comics under its Vertigo imprint, such as Books of Magick: Life During Wartime.

Spencer has also written for television. After winning a 'New Voices' competition with the play Tracey and Lewis, he secured a position at the BBC as script editor on prime-time cop show City Central. He later worked as a staff writer for the BBC's EastEnders and ITV's The Bill in addition to being storyliner and series editor and contributing scripts to Grange Hill. He was credited as script editor on the 2009 Aardman pilot for CBBC show Men in Coats.

An issue #368 of Doctor Who Magazine from March 2006 revealed that he was to write an episode for the Doctor Who spin-off series Torchwood and that he would make an appearance at the 2006 Bristol Comic Expo to publicise it, though he was not among the writers of episodes for the first series. However, a 2010 book Torch, Wood & Peasants, which was credited to "Webley Wildfoot", details the story of a writer on a fictitious British SF series and contains a script that has several strong similarities to Torchwood.

His later work included The Vinyl Underground for Vertigo.

In October 2010, Vertigo published the first issue of a Hellblazer mini-series, Hellblazer: City of Demons.

Spencer also ran a Facebook page 'Script Doctor', providing advice and support for new writers.

In June 2014, Vertigo published the first issue of his creator-owned monthly eight issue limited series Bodies. A television adaptation of the comic by Netflix and Bondage Pictures premiered in October 2023.

In 2015, Self Made Hero published the one-shot graphic novel Klaxon in September. Two months later, Vertigo published the first issue of the six-part series Slash & Burn.

Spencer died from heart failure in February 2021.

== Bibliography ==
- "Two pretty names" (with Sue Swassy in Crisis No. 33, 1989)
- "Strange hotel" (with Adrian Dungworthy, in Crisis No. 62, 1991)
- "The Wrong Brothers" (with John McCrea, in Strip #12, 1990)
- Judge Death: "Masque of the Judge, Death" (with John McCrea, in Judge Dredd Mega-Special No. 4, 1991)
- Mytek the Mighty: "Mytek Lives!" (with Shaky Kane, in 2000 AD Action Special, 1992)
- Harke & Burr:
  - "Antique and Curious" (with Dean Ormston, in Judge Dredd Megazine (vol. 2) #27–28, 1993)
  - "Hamster Horror" (with Dean Ormston, in Judge Dredd Megazine (vol. 2) #40–42, 1995)
  - "Grief Encounter" (with Dean Ormston, in Judge Dredd Megazine (vol. 2) #47–49, 1994)
  - "Secret Origin" (with Paul Peart, in Judge Dredd Megazine (vol. 2) No. 83, 1995)
  - "Satanic Farces" (with co-author Gordon Rennie and art by Dean Ormston, in Judge Dredd Megazine (vol. 3) #4–7, 1995)
- Judge Dredd:
  - "Creep" (with Kevin Cullen, in Judge Dredd Megazine (vol. 2) #41–44, 1993)
  - "Creep's Day Out" (with Kevin Cullen, in Judge Dredd Megazine (vol. 2) No. 50, 1994)
  - "Creep: True Love" (with Kevin Cullen, in Judge Dredd Megazine (vol. 2) #51–54, 1994)
  - "Fall of the House of Esher" (with Dean Ormston, in Judge Dredd Megazine (vol. 2) #70, 1995)
  - "A Very Creepy Christmas" (with Kevin Cullen, in Judge Dredd Megazine (vol. 2) #70, 1995)
  - "Plagues of Necropolis" (in Judge Dredd Megazine (vol. 2) #78–84, 1995)
  - "Sleeping Satellite" (with Morak, in Judge Dredd Mega Special 1995)
  - "Judge Planet II" (with Shaky Kane, in Judge Dredd Mega Special 1995)
- The Corps: "Fireteam One" (with Colin MacNeil and Paul Marshall, in 2000 AD No. 923, 1994)
- Books of Magick: Life During Wartime #1–15 (with Dean Ormston, Steve Yeowell and Duncan Fegredo, ongoing series, Vertigo, 2004–2005, trade paperback collects #1–5, 2005, ISBN 1-4012-0488-0)
- The Vinyl Underground #1–12 (with Simon Gane and Cameron Stewart, ongoing series, Vertigo, December 2007 – November 2008), collected as:
  - Watching the Detectives (collects #1–5, 128 pages, June 2008, ISBN 1-4012-1812-1)
  - Pretty Dead Things (collects #6–12, 128 pages, December 2008, ISBN 1-4012-1977-2)
- Hellblazer: City of Demons (with Sean Murphy, five-issue limited series, Vertigo, December 2010 – February 2011, tpb, May 2011, ISBN 1-4012-3153-5)
- Bodies (with Dean Ormston, Tula Lotay, Phil Winslade, Meghan Hetrick, Lee Loughridge, eight part limited series, Vertigo, July 2014 – February 2015)
- Klaxon (with Dix Grim, 120-page graphic novel published by Self Made Hero, September 2015)
- Slash & Burn (with Max Dunbar, Ande Park, Nik Filardi, six-part limited series, Vertigo, November 2015 – April 2016)
- Script Doctor's 100 Writing Tips For TV and Film (Lulu.com, February 2010, ISBN 1-4452-7777-8)
- Script Doctor's 100 More Writing Tips For TV and Film (Lulu.com, September 2010, ISBN 1-4461-9401-9)
