= Massimo Carnevale =

Italian cartoonist and illustrator

Massimo Carnevale (born 1967) is an Italian cartoonist and illustrator, most famous for creating covers for comic books.

== Career ==
Born in Rome, Massimo Carnevale started his career at Cioè and Tattilo in 1987, going on to join the artist team at Eura Editoriale.

He published his first cover for the weekly magazine Skorpio in 1990.

Carnevale created many of the covers for the Y: The Last Man series, published by DC Comics, under the label Vertigo.
