= The Monarchy (comics) =

American comic book series

- The Monarchy #1

Publication information
- Publisher: WildStorm (imprint of DC Comics)
- Schedule: Monthly
- Format: Ongoing series
- Genre: Superhero
- Publication date: April 2001 – May 2002
- No. of issues: 12
- Main character(s): Jackson King; Christine Trelane; Condition Red; Union; Professor Q The Metropolitan; Vox Populi; Malcolm King; Fenris; Jon Farmer

Creative team
- Created by: Doselle Young; John McCrea
- Written by: Doselle Young
- Artist(s): John McCrea; Warren Pleece

Collected editions
- Bullets Over Babylon: ISBN 1-56389-859-4

The Monarchy was an American comic book series written by Doselle Young with art by John McCrea. It was published by WildStorm, an imprint of DC Comics. The series focused on ex-Stormwatch members Jackson King and Christine Trelane (formerly known as Battalion and Synergy) gathering a team of superheroes for the extra-dimensional Weavers.

== Creation ==
The series was a spin-off of WildStorm's successful The Authority, where King and Trelane had made minor supporting appearances.

== Publishing history ==
The Monarchy was preceded by a larger appearance for the characters in The Authority #21 During publication, Young frequented DC's official messageboard, interacting with fans of the series. The Monarchy ran for 12 issues before ending due to low sales; Young felt delays to early issues adversely affected the series' fortunes and expressed hopes of continuing the series further down the line.

== Plot ==
During a party on the Carrier with the Authority, where King is increasingly annoyed with his former teammates and their methods, the Weavers contact King and inform him that the universe as they know it is threatened by Chimaera. To combat Chimaera, King and Trelane have to gather a group of unique individuals. They accept - leaving their jobs with the United Nations as liaisons to the Authority, get married and disappear. The UN orders FBI agent Morro to investigate their disappearance.

Over the next few months King and Trelane gather resources; they resurrect the superhero Union, free the chaos-artist Condition Red from his imprisonment and enlist Professor Q. Next they enlist Jon Farmer, who had been a member of a previous, alternate version of the Monarchy called the Throne. Farmer had been living as a priest for years, but King and Trelane convince him to join them. The team also recruits former Stormwatch member Union, resurrected as a merciless vigilante. King and Trelane then obtain essential weapons: a Kheran Dream Engine and an unrevealed weapon in exchange for the spirit of Hitler, who had possessed a politician. Their next recruit is Addie Vochs, a Century Baby whose powers had been repressed by the Fever Men, evil creatures of pure thought. Vochs is rejuvenated and receives her powers. King then investigates the former home of Henry Bendix, a genius and one-time Stormwatch commander. He finds information on creating a powerful being by binding an ancient Native American god to the soul of a human. King follows the instructions, tying the spirit of Los Angeles to the failed superhero Bram Dusk, but the resulting creature turns on King and kills him. In the end, Dusk takes control and becomes the Metropolitan.

Chimaera notices the threat of the Monarchy, while the Monarchy find out what exactly Chimaera is: due to the Authority's frequent travels through the Bleed, their characteristics and aggression were imprinted on many worlds. Several alternate versions of the Authority band together and conquer other worlds, forming Chimaera, an ever-expanding empire of evil Authorities led by the Higher Power, a reptilian version of the Authority. Chimaera attacks the Throne, the base of the Monarchy. The Monarchy manages to escape thanks to Jon Farmer’s sacrifice. Trelane leads her people towards a sanatorium where Malcolm King, Jackson's younger brother, is staying. Agent Morro is questioning Malcolm, but finds Malcolm has the Kheran Dream Engine and is a member of the Monarchy. Morro suddenly starts to remember a hidden program Jackson King put in his mind: he's King's backup and has King's plans telepathically planted inside his mind. Christine arrives and greets Malcolm, while Addie Vochs calms Morro. The Monarchy regroups and opens their attack on Chimaera following the plans Jackson left in Morro's head.

Elsewhere Bendix, now allied with the Weavers, finds the spirit of Jackson King and resurrects him as a being of pure willpower. King contacts the essence of Farmer and shapes it into a sword. Bendix also reveals the secret weapon they received in return for the spirit of Hitler: Fenris, the mythological wolf of Norse myth. King, Bendix and Fenris attack Chimaera as well. Together they defeat the troops of Chimaera and Trelane leads Malcolm and Addie Vochs to combine their powers, curing Chimaera's corrupted center. Trelane recruits a young boy named Matt who has the power to create superhumans and takes the Monarchy to the Throne, a mobile world and their new headquarters.

=== Characters ===
- Jackson King: telekinetic and telepath. Former leader of Stormwatch as Battalion, Jackson became the UN liaison to the Authority after Stormwatch disbanded. He grew more and more displeased with the Authority and accepted the Weaver's assignment. He now leads the Monarchy.
- Christine Trelane: formerly the Stormwatch member Synergy, Christine possesses the rare and valuable power of "Activation", allowing her to turn ordinary humans into superhumans. She is married to Jackson King and her intelligence and organisation skills make her as much the leader of the Monarchy as Jackson is.
- Jon Farmer: formerly the youngest member of the Throne, a previous version of the Monarchy until it was destroyed by an alternate version of Abraham Dusk. The Throne's version of Jackson King threw Farmer into the Bleed before detonating their base, leaving Farmer as the sole survivor. Farmer arrived on Earth in 1967 and had a brief career as a superhero before becoming a priest. Farmer had the ability to manipulate light and superluminal projection for flight and other effects, but his being jettisoned into the bleed changed his powers into a rainbow-colored energy dealing in the electromagnetic spectrum. Enabling its use for various effects, capable of superhuman physicality, dimensional porting, aviation under his own power and later; vast reality warping.
- Union: Ohmen, an alien from the planet Agea, became Union, a veteran superhero in the Wildstorm Universe. He served with Stormwatch as a reserve member and had a long career as a solo hero. During the party on the Authority's Carrier, Union committed suicide. Jackson then took his Justice Stone and resurrected Union, now as a dark and brooding man who was focused more on punishing the guilty than saving the innocent. Union's powers are the result of the Justice Stone implanted in his chest. It allows him to generate objects made from energy, like his fighting staff, gives him superhuman strength, durability and flight.
- Condition Red: Caleb was a trickster, imprisoned and tortured by his enemy Doctor Osiris for sleeping with his daughters. King and Trelane freed him and in return he joined the Monarchy. Condition Red reveals little about himself, acting glibly towards everyone. He has special weaponry that is capable of removing spirits from a person's body as well as more conventional weaponry. He also possesses a special device, looking like a vial of smoke that allows him to teleport.
- Professor Q: nicknamed the "Calculator Goddess", she has superhuman intelligence and seems to enjoy herself the most when she is fighting. She can generate machinery as quickly as she can invent it and was able to generate a singularity generator in picoseconds. She develops a romantic interest in Malcolm King.
- Vox Populi: Addie Vochs is a Century Baby born one year later than the others. Addie's powers were locked away for most of her life and when Trelane and Professor Q visit her she is an old woman. Trelane rejuvenates her and awakens her powers Addie Vochs becomes Vox Populi, capable of using her voice for various effects ranging from destructive songs to calming tunes.
- The Metropolitan: Abraham Dusk received superpowers when he was hit by lightning. As “the Last Angel”, he was a superhero with superhuman speed and agility, but was a failure both as a hero and in his private life. King decides to give him a chance at more power and bonds his soul to Chichinika, the snake god of Los Angeles. The resulting creature kills King, but with Farmer and Condition Red’s help, Bram manages to take control and becomes the Metropolitan. As the Metropolitan, Bram can adapt to whatever is thrown at him, constantly changing his abilities to remain unpredictable.
- Malcolm King: brother to Jackson King and the former Stormwatch member Strafe, Malcolm was put into a sanatorium when his brother's telepathy put him into a coma. When Agent Morro tries to find out more about Jackson King, Malcolm reveals that he has merged with the Kheran Dream Engine and is a member of the Monarchy. Christine Trelane dubs Malcolm 'Bellerophon'.
- Fenris: the secret weapon of the Monarchy is the mythological wolf from Norse myth that will swallow the sun at Ragnarok. Traded for the spirit of Hitler with some mysterious entities, the Monarchy receives Fenris as a little wolf, but after a few months it has grown to the size of a large building. Fenris doesn't seem to be more intelligent than a regular wolf and obeys King's commands. He seems to be little more than a living weapon of mass destruction.
- Matt: gifted with the ability to give superhuman powers to regular humans as well as possessing enormous destructive powers himself, Matt is saved by Jon Farmer when his powers make him release an enormous explosion. He is the first recruit of the Monarchy after they defeat Chimaera.
- The Weavers: Souls of dead humans who have the task of safeguarding the multiverse. They often appear as spiders or human-spider hybrids. They give information to the humans they work with, but don't act themselves in any way.
- Henry Bendix: An alternate universe version of the former Stormwatch Weatherman, he secretly replaced his Wildstorm Universe counterpart shortly after the reorganization of Stormwatch. His actions eventually lead his teammates to assume that he is insane, which in turn leads him to eventually be killed by Jenny Sparks. Bendix reveals that this was just a plot to turn into an imaginary being made out of pure willpower. As an imaginary being, he has nicknamed himself Happy Hank Bendix and acts like a completely different man than before. Bendix is a genius and uses weapons of his own design to help the Weavers in their task.
- Agent Morro: An FBI agent tasked with finding King and Trelane, Morro turns out to be a vital part of King's plan.

== Reception ==
Reviewing the Bullets Over Babylong trade paperback in 2012, Chaos McKenzie of Ain't It Cool News praised the series' vision. Frank Plowright of Slings & Arrows however felt the series was a let-down compared to The Authority, while Chad Evett of Comic Book Resources appreciated the series' attempts to do something different with the genre but felt let down by the ending.

== Collected editions ==
Title	ISBN	Release date	Issues
The Monarchy: Bullets Over Babylon	1563898594	December 2001	The Authority #21,The Monarchy #1-4

== See also ==
- United Nations in popular culture
