= Paul Jeacock =

English cricketer

Personal information
- Full name: Paul Anthony Jeacock
- Born: 25 April 1963 (age 63); Bicester, Oxfordshire, England
- Batting: Right-handed
- Bowling: Right-arm off break

Domestic team information
- Years: Team
- 1998–2004: Oxfordshire

Career statistics
Competition	List A
Matches	4
Runs scored	13
Batting average	–
100s/50s	–/–
Top score	9*
Balls bowled	216
Wickets	3
Bowling average	41.00
5 wickets in innings	–
10 wickets in match	–
Best bowling	2/23
Catches/stumpings	1/–
- Source: Cricinfo, 20 May 2011

Paul Anthony Jeacock (born 25 April 1963) is a former English cricketer. Jeacock was a right-handed batsman who bowled right-arm off break. He was born in Bicester, Oxfordshire.

Jeacock made his debut for Oxfordshire in the 1998 MCCA Knockout Trophy against Huntingdonshire. Jeacock played Minor counties cricket for Oxfordshire from 1998 to 2004, which included 14 Minor Counties Championship matches and 16 MCCA Knockout Trophy matches. He made his List A debut against the Durham Cricket Board in the 1999 NatWest Trophy. He played 3 further List A matches, the last coming against Shropshire in the 2nd round of the 2002 Cheltenham & Gloucester Trophy which was held in 2001. In his 4 List A matches he took 3 wickets at a bowling average of 41.00, with best figures of 2/23.
