= Judge Dredd Megazine =

Monthly British comic magazine

Judge Dredd: The Megazine

Publication information
- Publisher: Rebellion Developments
- Schedule: Monthly
- Format: Ongoing
- Publication date: October 1990 (Note: The cover date was actually the last day on which the issue was on sale, so the issue would have been published in the previous month.) – present

Creative team
- Written by: Alan Grant; John Wagner
- Artist: Carlos Ezquerra

Judge Dredd: The Megazine is a monthly British comic magazine, launched in September 1990. It is a sister publication to 2000 AD. Its name is a play on words, formed from "magazine" and Judge Dredd's locale Mega-City One.

== Content ==
Like 2000 AD, Judge Dredd Megazine is an anthology, featuring both ongoing and stand-alone stories. Some series have comprised a specific storyline while others only a loose thematic connection. Originally the Megazine only set stories in the world of Judge Dredd, including both spin-off series and Future Shock-style done-in-one stories, starting with Strange Cases and continuing with Tales from the Black Museum. It has since expanded to include some unconnected stories and text pieces, including articles, interviews and reviews.

Unlike 2000 AD, reprint material has been extensively used in order to bring costs down. As well as older 2000 AD stories such as Helltrekkers, there have also been reprints that originate elsewhere, such as Preacher and Charley's War. Since the demise of 2000 AD Extreme Edition, a bimonthly 2000 AD spinoff which focused on reprints of old strips, a separate reprint supplement has been packaged with each issue of the Megazine, usually focusing on the work of a particular 2000 AD contributor or compiling a particular strip.

Starting in issue #276 a creator-owned slot that featured Tank Girl, American Reaper and Snapshot has appeared.

=== Selected series ===
For a complete list of stories, see the External links section below.

- Al's Baby
- America
- Armitage
- The Bad Man
- Black Atlantic
- Black Siddha
- Blood of Satanus
- Brit-Cit Brute
- Cal-Hab Justice
- Citi-Def
- Creep
- Cursed Earth Koburn
- Devlin Waugh
- Dominion
- Fiends of the Eastern Front
- Harke and Burr
- Hawk the Slayer
- The Inspectre
- Insurrection
- Judge Dredd
- Judge Hershey
- Low Life
- Missionary Man
- Psi-Judge Anderson
- Shimura
- Sleeze 'n' Ryder
- The Simping Detective
- The Streets Of Dan Francisco
- Tales From The Black Museum
- Tempest
- Young Middenface

==== Themed one-offs ====
- Strange Cases
- Tales from the Black Museum

==== Creator-owned ====
- Al's Baby
- American Reaper
- Lily MacKenzie
- Numbercruncher
- Ordinary
- Snapshot
- Tank Girl

==== Reprints ====
From 2000AD:

- Button Man #3.72–3.75
- The Helltrekkers #218–223

From other publishers:

- Preacher #3.40–3.63
- Sin City #3.42–3.44
- Charley's War #211–244
- Bob The Galactic Bum #266–273

=== Supplements ===
Some issues are accompanied by supplements containing stories reprinted from earlier issues of the Megazine or from 2000AD. (A complete list is given below.)

=== Features ===
Text articles appear in between the stories. They are usually comic-related, such as biographies or obituaries, interviews with writers and artists, or articles about stories, but they can also be about science-fiction, horror and fantasy television shows, book reviews and upcoming films.

A feature that ran from 2006 was "Small Press". This section dealt with small press or self-published writer/artists. It featured reviews of comics, and included one story every issue. They are usually unrelated to the Judge Dredd universe.

At the end of most issues is a letters section, called Dreddlines, where the readers can voice their opinions about the magazine.

== Creators ==
Creators to have worked for Judge Dredd Megazine include:

- Simon Bisley
- Carlos Ezquerra
- Alan Grant (also a consultant editor)
- Trevor Hairsine
- Chris Halls
- Cam Kennedy
- Pat Mills
- Robbie Morrison
- Arthur Ranson
- Gordon Rennie
- Si Spencer
- Simon Spurrier
- John Wagner (also a consultant editor)

== Editors ==
Between 1990 and 2002, the issue numbering of the Megazine was reset several times. Originally, the issue numbers were in the format X.YY, where X was the volume number and YY the issue number within that volume. Issue 4.18 was the 200th issue overall; the next issue was numbered 201, and the numbering has since run uninterrupted, with the concept of volumes dropped.

- Steve MacManus, 1990–1991 (issues 1.01 – 1.12)
- David Bishop, 1991–1995 (1.13 – 3.12)
- John Tomlinson, 1996 (3.16 – 3.21)
- David Bishop, 1996–2000 (3.22 – 3.63)
- Andy Diggle, 2000 (3.64 – 3.68)
- David Bishop, 2000–2002 (3.69 – 4.08)
- Alan Barnes, 2002–2006 (4.09 – 4.18, 201 – 240)
- Matt Smith, 2006–present (241 – present)

On becoming editor, Matt Smith – already editor of 2000 AD – took the new title editor-in-chief.

== Awards ==
- 1992: won the UK Comic Art Award for Best Ongoing Publication
- 1993: won the UK Comic Art Award for Best Ongoing Publication
- 1999: nominated for the Eagle Award for Favourite British Comic
- 2002: nominated for the Eagle Award for Favourite British Comic
- 2000: nominated for the Eagle Award for Favourite British Comic
- 2004: nominated for the Eagle Award for Favourite British Comic
- 2005: nominated for the Eagle Award for Favourite Colour Comic Book – British
- 2006: won the Eagle Award for Best British Colour Comic
- 2007: nominated for the Eagle Award for Favourite Colour Comicbook – British
- 2008: nominated for the Eagle Award for Favourite Colour Comicbook – British
- 2012: nominated for the Eagle Award for Favourite Colour Comicbook – British

== See also ==
- 2000 AD crossovers, of which the Megazine is the other major comic outlet of stories.

== Sources ==
- Bishop, David (2007). Thrill Power Overload. Rebellion Developments. p. 260. ISBN 978-1-905437-22-1.
- Judge Dredd: The Megazine at the Comic Book DB (archived from the original)
- Judge Dredd: The Megazine (vol. 2) at the Comic Book DB (archived from the original)
- Judge Dredd Megazine (vol. 3) at the Comic Book DB (archived from the original)
- Judge Dredd Megazine (vol. 4) at the Comic Book DB (archived from the original)
- Judge Dredd Megazine (vol. 5) at the Comic Book DB (archived from the original)
- Judge Dredd: The Megazine at the Grand Comics Database
- Judge Dredd Megazine (Fleetway) at the Grand Comics Database
- Judge Dredd Megazine (Egmont) at the Grand Comics Database
