= Batman: Legends of the Dark Knight =

Comic book series

- Cover of Legends of the Dark Knight #2 (Dec. 1989), art by Ed Hannigan and George Pratt, cover design and logo by Dean Motter.

Publication information
- Publisher: DC Comics
- Schedule: Monthly, with a few biweekly runs
- Format: Completed ongoing series
- Publication date: (Legends of the Dark Knight); November 1989 – late August 1992 (Batman: Legends of the Dark Knight); September 1992 – March 2007 (Legends of the Dark Knight (vol. 2)); June 2012 – December 2013
- No. of issues: vol. 1: 215 (225 with seven Annuals, three Specials and one three-issue miniseries) vol. 2: 79 weekly digital issues
- Main character: Batman

Collected editions
- Shaman: ISBN 1-56389-083-6
- Gothic: ISBN 1-56389-028-3
- Prey: ISBN 1-4012-3515-8
- Venom: ISBN 1-56389-101-8
- Faces: ISBN 1-56389-126-3
- Collected Legends of the Dark Knight: ISBN 1-56389-147-6
- Other Realms: ISBN 1-85286-977-1
- Dark Legends: ISBN 1-56389-266-9
- Going Sane: ISBN 1-40121-821-0
- Monsters: ISBN 1-40122-494-6
- KnightsEnd: ISBN 1-56389-191-3
- The Ring, The Arrow and The Bat: ISBN 1-4012-0126-1
- Terror: ISBN 1-4012-0125-3
- Snow: ISBN 1-4012-1265-4

Batman: Legends of the Dark Knight, often simply called Legends of the Dark Knight, is the name of several DC comic books featuring Batman. The original series launched in 1989 as the third major monthly Batman title, following the popularity of Tim Burton's 1989 film Batman. Many of the stories follow the tone of Frank Miller's Batman: Year One. The creative team rotated with every story arc and the stories stood alone, unlike the inter-connected nature of other Batman comics of the time. Initially the title ran stories contained to five issues, often with more mature topics and sensibilities than the other Batman titles. After issue #20, the number of issues for each story began to vary and occasionally tied into crossover events.

Most stories in Batman: Legends of the Dark Knight are set early in Batman's career, although a few are set in the present and even the future. Stories set early in Batman's career are commonly referred to as "Year One" stories, loosely meaning Bruce Wayne's first several years of crimefighting as Batman. Stories in the title were initially only from before Robin, but Dick Grayson began appearing sporadically in later issues. The series, for the most part, eschewed appearances by other DC Universe superheroes and focused on Batman and his closest partners Alfred Pennyworth, Commissioner Gordon, and Batman's rogues gallery.

The title was discontinued with issue #214 (March 2007) and replaced with a new Batman anthology series, Batman Confidential, which focuses on more personal events in Batman's life (first encounters, building of new technology, etc.), rather than early crime-fighting tales.

Some of the creative talent who have worked on the series include Chuck Dixon, Alan Grant, Archie Goodwin, Dennis O'Neil, Dwayne McDuffie, Doug Moench, Grant Morrison, Mike Mignola, Bill Willingham, Matt Wagner and Marshall Rogers.

In 2012, DC Comics revived the series as Legends of the Dark Knight, a digital-first weekly series. The series was similarly composed of self-contained stories with revolving creative teams. The first issue, "The Butler Did It", by Damon Lindelof and Jeff Lemire, debuted in June 2012.

== Publication history ==
=== Volume 1 (1989–2007) ===
The original series was published as issues #1–214 from 1989 to 2007. Seven Annuals were also published.

Three one-issue Halloween specials, Fears, Madness and Ghosts, a fourth one-issue special based on the Knightfall story arc, Mitefall and one three-issue miniseries, Batman: Legends of the Dark Knight - Jazz, were also published under the Legends of the Dark Knight banner.

=== Volume 2 (2012–2015) ===
The second volume was published in 88 weekly "digital-first" installments and subsequently collected as Legends of the Dark Knight #1-13 and Legends of the Dark Knight 100-Page Super Spectacular #1-5. The entire series was collected in five trade paperback volumes.

=== Hardcover collection series (2011–present) ===
In 2011, DC began publishing some of its premium hardcover collections under Legends of the Dark Knight banner. These volumes focus on historically significant Batman creators (the companion volumes were branded as Tales of the Batman).

- Legends of the Dark Knight: Jim Aparo Volume 1 (2012)
- Legends of the Dark Knight: Jim Aparo Volume 2 (2013)
- Legends of the Dark Knight: Jim Aparo Volume 3 (2017)
- Legends of the Dark Knight: Norm Breyfogle Volume 1 (2015)
- Legends of the Dark Knight: Norm Breyfogle Volume 2 (2018)
- Legends of the Dark Knight: Alan Davis Volume 1 (2012)
- Legends of the Dark Knight: José Luis García-López (2023)
- Legends of the Dark Knight: Michael Golden (2019)
- Legends of the Dark Knight: Marshall Rogers (2011)
- Legends of the Dark Knight: Matt Wagner (2020)

== Story arcs ==
=== 1989–2007 series ===
Shaman (#1–5)

By Dennis O'Neil, Ed Hannigan, and John Beatty

Bruce Wayne and a bounty hunter climb a mountain in Alaska as they try to capture a murderer named Thomas Woodley. Woodley quickly manages to kill the bounty hunter before falling off the cliff after a small fight with Wayne. Wayne's supplies are lost with Woodley, which nearly results in Wayne's death when a Native American with her grandfather discover him. The grandfather is able to save Wayne's life by taking Wayne to his cabin and tells him a story on how the Bat gained its wings, while wearing a mask of a bat. After he recuperates and leaves, Wayne is warned by the granddaughter never to tell anyone the story.

Upon his return to Gotham City shortly after, Wayne attempts to fight crime, but fails miserably. That night after he fails, a bat flies into the room and reminds Wayne of the Native American's story from years earlier and so he decides to create a costume for himself and become Batman.

Note: Legend of the Dark Knight #1 (the first issue of the "Shaman" storyline) was printed with several different colored covers as collector's items.

Gothic (#6–10)

By Grant Morrison and Klaus Janson

A man known as "Mr. Whisper" is killing off mob bosses one by one. The mobsters explain to Batman that he was a child killer over 30 years ago, and (similar to the film M) the mobsters had found and killed him when there was too much pressure from the cops over them. At the same time, Batman's investigation links Mr. Whisper with a hideous event in Bruce Wayne's school days, a bargain reminiscent of Don Giovanni, and the Gotham City Cathedral.

Note: Grant Morrison's second Batman story and first non-graphic novel Batman story.

Prey (#11–15)

By Doug Moench, Paul Gulacy, and Terry Austin

Batman must contend with the brilliant but deranged psychiatrist Hugo Strange, who foments a massive smear campaign against him and attempts to uncover his secret identity.

Note: Retells the second meeting, in Post-Crisis continuity, between Batman and Hugo Strange (the first meeting would be told, years later, in Dark Moon Rising: Batman and the Monster Men).

Venom (#16–20)

By Dennis O'Neil, Russell Braun, Trevor Von Eeden, and José Luis García-López

When Batman fails to save the life of a young girl held for ransom, he decides to try a new experimental steroid-drug designed by her father called Venom.

Note: First appearance of the "Venom" drug-steroid, later used by Bane. First Legends of the Dark Knight story to be referenced in-canon in the main Batman titles during Knightfall.

Faith (#21–23)

By Mike W. Barr, Bart Sears, and Randy Elliott

A drug addict is rescued from a fatal beating by Batman, which inspires him to organize a group of neighborhood vigilantes to take up Batman's cause. However, his addled dreams convince him that he must supplant Batman. Meanwhile, Dr. Leslie Thompkins discovers Bruce Wayne's secret identity.

Note: Tells the previously-unseen story of Leslie Thompkins discovering that Bruce Wayne is Batman. Also, it is the first Legends of the Dark Knight story to not consist of the original five issue one story format.

Flyer (#24–26)

By Howard Chaykin and Gil Kane

One of the officers who was injured during the siege against Batman in Batman: Year One resurfaces in a mechanized combat suit, targeting Batman for death.

Note: An unofficial sequel to Batman: Year One.

Destroyer (Part 2 of 3) (#27)

By Dennis O'Neil, Chris Sprouse, and Bruce Patterson

A miscreant is blowing up Gotham's newer buildings which, according to him, have overshadowed the old Gotham and his destruction leads to Art.

Note: Part of a three-part crossover involving Legends of the Dark Knight, Batman, and Detective Comics. First issue of the series to be set in the then-present day continuity and the first issue to crossover with the other Batman titles.

Faces (#28–30)

By Matt Wagner

Two-Face takes over a small island with plans to create a society in his own scarred image.

Family (#31)

By James D. Hudnall and Brent Anderson

After Bruce forces Alfred to take a vacation to Corto Maltese, he must rescue him from kidnappers.

Note: First regular DC Universe appearance of the island nation of Corto Maltese, which was introduced in the pages of the out-of-continuity Batman: The Dark Knight Returns miniseries.

Blades (#32–34)

By James Robinson and Tim Sale

While Batman is distracted with a serial killer who targets senior citizens, a new vigilante, the swashbuckling Cavalier, begins his own war on crime.

Note: The Cavalier who appears in the story is a new character, previously never seen before, and has no ties with the more commonly known version of the character.

Destiny (#35–36)

By Bo Hampton and Mark Kneece

Batman meets another costumed vigilante from Norway who dresses like a Viking, and learns an ancient tale of a Norse hero known as the Bat Man.

Mercy (#37)

By Dan Abnett, Andy Lanning, and Colin MacNeil

In his early days, Batman trained a female rookie cop, Mercedes "Mercy" Stone, to fight in hand-to-hand combat. Five years later, he must rescue her from a pit-fighting ring.

Legend of the Dark Mite (#38)

By Alan Grant and Kevin O'Neill

A junkie criminal turned Arkham Asylum inmate, Bob Overdog, claims that the events leading up to his imprisonment were orchestrated by an imp from another dimension (the titular Bat-Mite) who idolizes and attempts to emulate Batman.

Note: Set in the then-present day continuity of the Batman titles and the first Post-Crisis appearance of Bat-Mite.

Mask (#39–40)

By Bryan Talbot

Batman wakes up in a hospital bed surrounded by doctors who tell him that he is an alcoholic tramp who dresses in a batsuit made of garbage. He wonders whether it is some sort of hallucination, or is his life as Batman the real illusion.

Sunset (#41)

By Tom Joyner, Keith S. Wilson, and Jim Fern

While fleeing the police, Batman encounters an actress-turned-vampire who was thought to have died 40 years ago and Batman is hypnotized into doing her will.

Note: Inspired by early Batman stories involving Batman facing vampires in the 1930s. The plotline also deliberately parallels the classic film Sunset Boulevard.

Hothouse (#42–43)

By John Francis Moore and P. Craig Russell

Pamela Isley is out of the asylum after her first encounter with Batman. But when one of her colleagues dies under mysterious circumstances, her rehabilitation is called into question.

Note: First story to feature Poison Ivy attempting to reform. It was later loosely adapted into the Batman: The Animated Series episode "House and Garden".

Turf (#44–45)

By Steven Grant and Shawn McManus

Batman and Captain James Gordon go after racist cops who are brutalizing and murdering African Americans.

Heat (#46–49)

By Doug Moench and Russ Heath

When Thomas Blake starts murdering young women, Batman and Catwoman form an uneasy alliance to stop him.

Note: The story features an alternate origin/take on Catman, portraying him as a serial killer driven by memories of an abusive mother. The story was one of several Batman/Catwoman stories that were officially declared non-canon following the events of Zero Hour: Crisis in Time!.

Images (#50)

By Dennis O'Neil and Bret Blevins

A young Batman meets his match when he encounters a murderous villain known as the Joker.

Note: The story is a retelling of the first encounter between Batman and the Joker, from Batman #1, with elements from Batman: Year One added as part of the retelling.

Snitch (#51)

By Robert Loren Fleming and David G. Klein

A highly skilled hitman whose rule is to only fire a single shot targets Batman and Gotham's other defender, the Ragman.

Tao (#52–53)

By Alan Grant and Arthur Ranson

A man from Batman's past comes to Gotham seeking vengeance.

Sanctum (#54)

By Dan Raspler and Mike Mignola

While hunting a serial killer, Batman discovers an undead man who attempts to kill him in order to live again.

Watchtower (#55–57)

By Chuck Dixon and Mike McMahon

A tale of an alternate future Batman.

Storm (#58)

By Andrew Donkin, Graham Brand, and John Higgins

A foreign diplomat whose country is guilty of violating human rights is targeted by a group of terrorists.

Quarry (#59–61)

By Dennis O'Neil, Ron Wagner, Eduardo Barreto, and Ron McCain

Bruce Wayne, using a wheelchair after having his back broken by Bane, attempts to rescue Jack Drake and Shondra Kinsolving from Shondra's evil brother, the Asp.

Note: Set in the then-present day continuity of the Batman titles and a part of the "Knightquest: The Search" crossover.

KnightsEnd (#62–63)

By Chuck Dixon, Barry Kitson, Ron Wagner, and Ron McCain

Bruce Wayne returns to Gotham to reclaim the mantle of Batman from an out-of-control Azrael. To combat Azrael, Bruce makes a dangerous alliance with Lady Shiva to train him to fight the assassin.

Note: Set in the then-present day continuity and a part of the "KnightsEnd" crossover.

Terminus (#64)

By Jamie Delano, Chris Bachalo, and Mark Pennington

Batman tracks a drug addict to a hotel filled with lost souls.

Going Sane (#65–68)

By J. M. DeMatteis, Joe Staton, and Steve Mitchell

When the Joker traps Batman in an explosion, he believes that he is finally rid of his arch-foe. As a result, his insane mind returns to sanity and the Ace of Knaves forgets his bloodstained past, starting a new life as the average citizen "Joseph Kerr". Batman, however, is still alive, and his return to Gotham means the end to the Joker's newfound happiness.

Note: The plot for this story had originally been submitted to DC by J. M. DeMatteis in the mid-1980s, but was rejected because it was too similar to another Batman story in production at that time, Batman: The Killing Joke. DeMatteis reworked the original draft into the Spider-Man storyline "Kraven's Last Hunt".

Criminals (#69–70)

By Steven Grant and Mike Zeck

Batman goes undercover as a prison inmate.

Werewolf (#71–73)

By James Robinson and John Watkiss

A series of murders connected to Wayne Enterprises leads Batman to London. While there, he discovers a supernatural mystery.

Engines (#74–75)

By Ted McKeever

A story told from the perspective of Gotham's newest serial killer, a slaughterhouse employee who covets the aging and decaying process.

Sleeping (#76–78)

By Scott Hampton

When a car accident leaves Bruce Wayne comatose, Batman must travel through the Underworld back to the land of the living. On the way, Batman meets another coma victim in need of assistance. Before returning to the real world, he must unravel the connection between himself and his evil "soul twin", all while being pursued by an Underworld demon.

Favorite Things (#79)

By Mark Millar, Steve Yeowell, and Dick Giordano

On Christmas Eve, Batman combs the city for a gang known as "the Chessmen", who have been stealing presents from a multitude of wealthy households, including Wayne Manor.

Idols (#80–82)

By James Vance, Dougie Braithwaite, and Sean Hardy

A new boutique is cashing in on the Bat-craze sweeping Gotham. Captain Gordon must cooperate with the FBI when a serial killer strikes in Gotham. Meanwhile, Batman is on the trail of a copycat vigilante in a bat-mask, while trying to stop the violence his publicity might cause.

Infected (#83–84)

By Warren Ellis and John McCrea

Two escaped super-soldier experiments wreak havoc in Gotham. Batman intervenes, as all of Gotham might be the next victim.

Citadel (#85)

By James Robinson and Tony Salmons

Batman ascends a heavily guarded tower, laced with death traps, to reach his quarry on the top floor.

Conspiracy (#86–88)

By Doug Moench, J. H. Williams III, and Mick Gray

A series of ritual murders in Gotham leads Batman to Los Angeles. As the stakes get higher, Batman and a new ally work together to unravel a conspiracy that reaches from drug-peddling biker gangs to the CIA and a mysterious religious order.

Clay (#89–90)

By Alan Grant and Quique Alcatena

Batman faces his slipperiest foe to date in the form of the new Clayface, Matt Hagen.

Notes: A retelling of the story "The Challenge of Clay-Face" in Detective Comics #298.

Freakout (#91–93)

By Garth Ennis and Will Simpson

Batman investigates a new designer drug, an enhanced form of LSD.

Stories (#94)

By Michael T. Gilbert

A writer by the name of Saul Fisher finds himself the target of an assassination attempt by a group of religious fundamentalists known as "the Enlightened". As a result, Fisher finds himself trapped in a powerless elevator, panicking as the gunmen get closer. To help calm him, the elevator's other passengers, from an aged Julie Madison to a retired policeman and his grandson, share with him tales of their encounters with Batman.

Note: This story features homages to the Batman of the Golden Age, Silver Age, Bronze Age, and Dark Age. It was later adapted (with different framing sequences/stories) for Batman: The Animated Series as "Legends of the Dark Knight".

Dirty Tricks (#95–97)

By Dan Abnett, Andy Lanning, and Anthony Williams

An assassin known as the Magician, who seems unstoppable, is in Gotham. Bruce Wayne ran across him in Eastern Europe before becoming Batman and barely survived.

Steps (#98–99)

By Paul Jenkins and Sean Phillips

Batman must track down a new serial killer on the street who murders prostitutes with a crossbow, with the only witness to the case an autistic teenager.

Choices (#100)

By Dennis O'Neil and Dave Taylor

When a married acrobatic couple are killed during a performance, Batman adopts their son, Dick, and trains him to become his sidekick, Robin the Boy Wonder.

Note: A retelling of the origin of the first Robin (Dick Grayson) from Detective Comics #38.

The Incredible Adventures of Batman (#101)

By John Wagner and Carlos Ezquerra

In 2099, Batman has become a figure of legend. A vigilante is inspired to imitate Batman, obtaining his costume from the recently closed Museum of Gotham.

Spook (#102–104)

By James Robinson and Paul Johnson

The Modern Age debut of the supervillain known as the Spook. Bruce Wayne attends a weekend business retreat at a secluded ski resort. When the power goes out and one of the guests winds up dead, Bruce switches into Batman mode. The Dark Knight fights the Spook and his henchman Darwin. Eventually, the Spook blows up the house, sending the few survivors fleeing on a private jet. When the Spook shows up aboard the plane, Batman fights him again, but the new villain disappears. Batman then exposes one of the survivors as the Spook's accomplice.

Duty (#105–106)

By C.J. Henderson, Trevor Von Eeden, and Josef Rubenstein

When the Joker is broken out of Arkham by a terrorist group while Batman is working on a case in the Middle East, Captain James Gordon and Sergeant Harvey Bullock must find a way to stop the madman without the help of the Caped Crusader.

Note: This story is set in the days before Gordon achieved the rank of police commissioner and Bullock the rank of detective. In addition, Batman does not appear in a single panel of the story.

Stalking (#107–108)

By Lee Marrs and Eddy Newell

The Primal Riddle (#109–111)

By Steve Englehart, Dusty Abell, and Drew Geraci

A battle with the Riddler results in Batman being badly electrocuted, resulting in a near death experience that separates his "spirit" from his body. As the soulless Batman struggles to foil the Riddler's latest scheme, his "spirit" wanders around Gotham possessing a wide variety of "hosts", from a small boy to the Riddler himself.

Shipwreck (#112–113)

By Dan Vado, Norman Felchle, and Frank Cirocco

After Batman foils a group of mercenaries in their attempt to free an imprisoned national, the group attempts to hold a cruise ship full of wealthy Gothamites hostage. Batman must fight his way through the bowels of the ship to confront the mercenary leader and save the passengers.

Playground (#114)

By James Robinson, Dan Brereton, and Tim Bradstreet

Batman makes the foolish mistake of blindly confronting a professional mob assassin from Chicago on the latter's home turf, resulting in him suffering multiple wounds and becoming trapped in the slums of the Windy City. A cat-and-mouse game with the assassin ensues, as the Dark Knight struggles, and interacts, with the homeless men and women that populate the slums.

The Darkness (#115)

By Darren Vincenzo and Luke McDonnell

No Man's Land (#116–126)

Following a devastating earthquake and the manipulations of Lex Luthor, Gotham City is disowned by the United States government. Batman and his allies must try to keep what is left of civilization intact in the madness, while solving the mystery of who the new Batgirl is.

Note: For the course of nearly an entire year (11 issues) Legends of the Dark Knight abandoned its anthology format and became a regular continuity Batman book, crossing over with its fellow Batman titles (Batman, Detective Comics and Shadow of the Bat) and spin-offs (Azrael, Catwoman, Robin, and Nightwing) for the duration of the No Man's Land storyline.

The Arrow and the Bat (#127–131)

By Dennis O'Neil, Sergio Cariello, and Matt Ryan

Siege (#132–136)

By Archie Goodwin, James Robinson Marshall Rogers, and Bob Wiacek

Silver St. Cloud and an aging mercenary with ties to Bruce's grandfather return to Gotham as the mercenary and his allies attempt to destroy Wayne Manor and Gotham City.

Note: The story is set during the timeframe in which Bruce Wayne and Alfred Pennyworth lived in a downtown penthouse, instead of Wayne Manor. The story is also one of the final stories written by Archie Goodwin before his death.

Terror (#137–141)

By Doug Moench, Paul Gulacy, and Jimmy Palmiotti

Professor Hugo Strange resurfaces and breaks Dr. Jonathan Crane (the Scarecrow) out of Arkham Asylum to terrorize Batman and Catwoman. Strange enhances Crane's fear toxin with a hallucinogen and gives him a subconscious hatred of Batman, in addition to a "haunted" house as a base of operations.

Note: A spiritual sequel to the earlier Moench Legends of the Dark Knight story "Prey".

The Demon Laughs (#142–145)

By Chuck Dixon, Jim Aparo, and John Cebollero

Ra's al Ghul recruits the Joker in his latest scheme to kill off 95% of the world's population and the Ace of Knaves is all too happy to accept. An attempted double-crossing on the Joker's part, however, results in him being gunned down by Ra's' followers, and if Batman is to have a hope of stopping Ra's from spreading the Joker's virus, he must save the life of his deadliest foe.

Note: Elements from this story, in particular the Joker being recruited by Ra's al Ghul, were later used in the animated film Batman: Under the Red Hood, instead of the plot from "A Death in the Family", to explain how the Joker killed Jason Todd.

Bad (#146–148)

By Doug Moench and Barry Kitson

Grimm (#149–153)

By J. M. DeMatteis, Trevor Von Eeden, and José Luis García-López

Colossus (#154–155)

By Mike Baron and Bill Reinhold

Blink (#156–158)

By Dwayne McDuffie, Val Semeiks, and Dan Green

Batman teams up with a man who can see through the eyes of others in order to track down the leader of an underground snuff film ring.

Loyalties (#159–161)

By John Ostrander, David Lopez, and Dan Green

Captain James Gordon has been kidnapped and brought back to his hometown of Chicago to be tortured into revealing the name of the last surviving eyewitness to a grisly murder. That witness was his young niece, Barbara.

Auteurism (#162–163)

By John Arcudi and Roger Langridge

The Joker, deeming Gotham's newspapers inadequate to represent his "true self", enlists the help of Buddy Kantor, a highly eccentric comedian/filmmaker, to chronicle his exploits. In the end, however, Buddy's inflated ego and tenuous grasp on reality may prove to be too much even for the Clown Prince of Crime.

Don't Blink (#164–167)

By Dwayne McDuffie, Val Semeiks, and Dan Green

Urban Legend (#168)

By Bill Willingham and Tom Fowler

Irresistible (#169–171)

By Tom Peyer, Tony Harris, and Wade von Grawbadger

Testament (#172–176)

By John Wagner and Chris Brunner

Lost Cargo (#177–178)

By Devin Grayson, Jean-Jacques Dzialowski, and George Rodriguez

Full Circle (#179)

By A. J. Lieberman and Greg Scott

The Secret City (#180–181)

By Dylan Horrocks, Ramon Bachs, and Jon Holdredge

Oracle enters a virtual world to investigate a series of murders.

War Games (#182–184)

Stephanie Brown and Orpheus are savagely murdered by the returning Black Mask, when a violent gang war erupts within Gotham.

Note: As it was with "No Man's Land", Legends of the Dark Knight stepped away from the usual self-contained story-arc structure for a few issues to cross over with the other Batman books for the War Games storyline.

Riddle Me That (#185–189)

By Shane McCarthy, Tommy Castillo, and Rodney Ramos

Cold Snap (#190–191)

By J. Torres, David Lopez, and Fernando Blanco

Mr. Freeze is acting strangely and Batman fears he may be preparing for suicide.

Snow (#192–196)

By J. H. Williams III, Dan Curtis Johnson, and Seth Fisher

When Captain Gordon refuses to give him access to GCPD files on a major criminal, Batman takes things into his own hands and assembles a private team of investigators. At the same time, researcher Victor Fries suffers tragedy and goes on a rampage against his employers.

Note: A retelling of the origin of Mr. Freeze, using the origin established for the character in Batman: The Animated Series.

Blaze of Glory (#197–199)

By Will Pfeifer and Chris Weston

Emergency (#200)

By Eddie Campbell, Daren White, and Bart Sears

During his latest battle with Batman, the Joker is inadvertently exposed to his own Joker venom.

Cold Case (#201–203)

By Christos N. Gage, Ron Wagner, and Bill Reinhold

Madmen of Gotham (#204–206)

By Justin Gray and Steven Cummings

Darker than Death (#207–211)

By Bruce Jones and Ariel Olivetti

Chicks Dig the Bat (#212)

By Adam Beechen, Steve Scott, and Nathan Massengill

A socially awkward high school student gets more than he bargained for when he invites a date to watch Batman from a local rooftop.

Otaku (#213)

By Matt Wayne and Steven Cummings

The murder of a black market dealer who specializes in authentic Batman-related memorabilia (lost Batarangs, cowls, etc.) leads Batman to Akihabara, where he must comb the Electric City's various themed establishments to find a Yakuza leader that has a rather disturbing fetish for costumed heroes.

Superstitious and Cowardly (#214)

By Christos N. Gage and Phil Winslade

Famed assassin Deadshot returns to Gotham, following the events of Infinite Crisis, to kill a witness who is set to testify against a corrupt businessman. Knowing of his recent heroic actions during the crossover as part of the Secret Six, Batman must find a way to convince Deadshot to abandon the contract to kill the witness.

Viewpoint (#0)

A preview of upcoming stories published during the Post-Zero Hour "Zero Month" event.

Note: Vince Giarrano produced the framing sequences between the previews. Two of the preview stories featured here were never published.

Duel (Annual #1)

By Dennis O'Neil, Jim Aparo, Keith Giffen, Malcolm Jones III, Joe Quesada, Josef Rubenstein, Tom Lyle, Ty Templeton Dan Spiegle, James Blackburn, and Michael Golden; cover artist: Mike Mignola

Batman has illusions about the metaphorical "burden" he has to carry.

Vows (Annual #2)

By Dennis O'Neil, Michael Netzer, and Luke McDonnell

Transformation (Annual #3)

By Dennis O'Neil, Mike Manley, Luke McDonnell, Gray Morrow, and Ricardo Villagran

Azrael, who is replacing the injured Bruce Wayne as Batman, must help a disillusioned priest who has recently gained superpowers fight an army of alien creatures feeding on humans in Gotham.

Notes: Part of the 1993 "Bloodlines" DC Annual crossover.

Citizen Wayne (Annual #4)

By Brian Augustyn, Mark Waid, Joe Staton, and Horacio Ottolini

Note: Part of the 1994 Elseworlds Annual event, featuring DC characters in various Elseworlds scenarios.

Wings (Annual #5)

By Chuck Dixon and Quique Alcatena

Batman and the Man-Bat's first encounter is retold through the point-of-view of the Man-Bat.

Note: Part of the 1995 "Year One" banner event involving that year's DC Annuals. Features a retelling of the origin of the Man-Bat, originally from Detective Comics #400.

Executioner (Annual #6)

By Alan Grant, Barry Kitson, and Vince Giarrano

I Am A Gun (Annual #7)

By James Robinson, Steve Yeowell, and Russ Heath

=== 2012–2015 series ===
The Butler Did It (#1)

By Damon Lindelof and Jeff Lemire

All of the Above (#1)

By Jonathan Larsen and J.G. Jones

The Crime Never Committed (#1)

By Tom Taylor and Nicola Scott

Crisis in Identity (#2)

By B. Clay Moore and Ben Templesmith

Letters to Batman (#3)

By Steve Niles and Trevor Hairsine

A Game to Die for (#4)

By T. J. Fixman and Christopher Mitten

Batman: The Movie (#4)

By Andrew Dabb and Giorgio Pontrelli

Together (#4)

By Jonathan Larsen and Tan Eng Huat

Slam! (#5)

By Joshua Hale Fialkov and Phil Hester

Gotham Spirit (#6)

By Jeff Parker and Gabriel Hardman

Dungeons and Dragons (#6)

By Michael Avon Oeming

Look Inside (#6)

By Rob Williams and Juan Jose Ryp

Haunted Arkham (#7)

By Joe Harris and Jason Masters

== Continuity ==
Technically, most of the stories in Batman: Legends of the Dark Knight are in the accepted Batman continuity, albeit with a number of exceptions. These include stories set in the year 3000, Batman being a cyborg, certain Joker or Clayface stories that just do not fit chronologically and many more. Many of the stories share a lot of elements with the regular Batman and Detective Comics and have often been referenced in modern continuity, notably Leslie Thompkins' discovery of Batman's identity, the origin of Bane's drug Venom, the characterization of Hugo Strange, the origin of the Batcave, and others. Whereas most comic book titles move forward chronologically, Legends tells stories in random order, mainly focusing on Years One through Five, but sometimes including canonical stories after that time as well. Batman Confidential was a series with which the original Legends utilized a similar literary format.

DC has stated that the stories released between 2012-2015 are not set in the current Batman continuity. However, over the years several issues from this series, such as "Dr. Quinn's Diagnosis", had been integrated and collected as part of the canon Batman mythos.

== Specials ==
In the 1990s, writer Jeph Loeb and artist Tim Sale collaborated on three Halloween specials collected as Batman: Haunted Knight that led them to create Batman: The Long Halloween as stated in the introduction to the book by Jeph Loeb. The three specials are titled "Fears" (1993), "Madness" (1994) and "Ghosts" (1995). In the third and last one, based on Charles Dickens' novel A Christmas Carol, Bruce is visited by three spirits on Halloween, that of Poison Ivy (the Spirit of Halloween Past), the Joker (the Spirit of Halloween Present), and a cloaked, skeletal version of Batman (the Spirit of Halloween Yet To Come). Having been immersed so much in stopping crime for nearly two years (the time being Year Two in which the story takes place), Bruce undergoes a change, much like Ebenezer Scrooge, in which he is reminded what it is to be human.

Another special released was Batman: Jazz (1995), a three-issue miniseries written by Gerard Jones and Mark Badger.

== Crossover issues ==
- Destroyer – #27
- Knightquest – #59-61
- KnightsEnd – #62-63
- No Man's Land – #116-126
- War Games – #182-184

== Writers ==
- Dennis O'Neil (#1-5, 16-20, 27, 50, 59-61, 63, 100, 127-131, Annual #1-3)
- Grant Morrison (#6-10)
- Doug Moench (#11-15, 46-49, 86-88, 137-141, 146-148)
- Mike W. Barr (#21-23)
- Howard Chaykin (#24-26)
- Matt Wagner (#28-30)
- James Hudnall (#31)
- James Robinson (#32-34, 71-73, 85, 102-104, 114, Annual #7)
- Bo Hampton & Mark Kneece (#35-36)
- Dan Abnett & Andy Lanning (#37, 95-97)
- Alan Grant (#38, 52-53, 89-90, Annual #6)
- Bryan Talbot (#39-40)
- Tom Joyner (#41)
- John Francis Moore (#42-43)
- Steven Grant (#44-45, 69-70)
- Robert Loren Fleming (#51)
- Mike Mignola (#54)
- Chuck Dixon (#55–57, 62, 124, 142–145, Annual #5)
- Graham Brand (#58)
- Jamie Delano (#64)
- J. M. DeMatteis (#65-68, 149-153)
- Ted McKeever (#74-75)
- Scott Hampton (#76-78)
- Mark Millar (#79)
- James Vance (#80-82)
- Warren Ellis (#83-84)
- Garth Ennis (#91-93)
- Michael T. Gilbert (#94)
- Paul Jenkins (#98–99)
- C.J. Henderson (#105-106)
- Archie Goodwin (#0, 132-136)
- Dwayne McDuffie (#156-158, 164-167)
- Bill Willingham (#168)
- Lee Marrs (#107–108)
- Steve Englehart (#109–111)
- Dan Vado (#112–113)
- Darren Vincenzo (#115)
- Mike Baron (#154-155)
- John Ostrander (#159-161)
- John Arcudi (#152-153)
- Tom Peyer (#169-171)
- John Wagner (#101, 172-176)
- Devin K. Grayson (#177-178)
- A. J. Lieberman (#179)
- Dylan Horrocks (#180-181)
- Shane McCarthy (#185-189)
- J. Torres (#190-191)
- Dan Curtis Johnson (#192-196)
- Will Pfeifer (#197-199)
- Eddie Campbell (#200)
- Christos Gage (#201-203, 214)
- Justin Gray (#204-206)
- Bruce Jones (#207-211)
- Adam Beechen (#212)
- Matt Wayne (#213)

== Artists ==
- Ed Hannigan (#1-5)
- Klaus Janson (#6-10)
- Paul Gulacy (#11-15, 137-141)
- Trevor Von Eeden (#16-20, 105-106, 149-153)
- Bart Sears (#21-23)
- Gil Kane (#24-26)
- Chris Sprouse (#27)
- Matt Wagner (28-30)
- Brent Anderson (#31)
- Tim Sale (#32-34)
- Bo Hampton (#35-36)
- Colin MacNeil (#37)
- Kevin O'Neill (#38)
- Bryan Talbot (#39-40)
- Keith S. Wilson (#41)
- P. Craig Russell (#42-43)
- Shawn McManus (#44-45)
- Russ Heath (#46-49)
- Bret Blevins (#50)
- David G. Klein (#51)
- Arthur Ranson (#52-53)
- Mike Mignola (#54)
- Mike McMahon (#55-57)
- John Higgins (#58)
- Ron Wagner (#59, 62, 201-203)
- Barry Kitson (#63, 146-148)
- Eduardo Barreto (#60-61)
- Chris Bachalo (#64)
- Joe Staton (#65-68)
- Mike Zeck (#69-70)
- John Watkiss (#71-73)
- Ted McKeever (#74-75)
- Scott Hampton (#76-78)
- Steve Yeowell (#79)
- Doug Braithwaite (#80-82)
- John McCrea (#83-84)
- Tony Salmons (#85)
- J. H. Williams III (#86-88, 192-196)
- Quique Alcatena (#89-90)
- Will Simpson (#91-93)
- Michael T. Gilbert (#94)
- Anthony Williams (#95-97)
- Sean Phillips (#98-99)
- Dave Taylor (#100)
- Carlos Ezquerra (#101)
- Paul Johnson (#102-104)
- Eddy Newell (#107-108)
- Dusty Abell (#109-111)
- Norman Felchle (#112-113)
- Dan Brereton (#114)
- Luke McDonnell (#115)
- Sergio Cariello (#127-131)
- Marshall Rogers (#132-136)
- Jim Aparo (#142-145)
- Bill Reinhold (#154-155)
- Val Semeiks (#156-158, 164-167)
- David Lopez (#159-161, 190-191)
- Roger Langridge (#162-163)
- Tom Fowler (#168)
- Tony Harris (#169-171)
- Chris Brunner (#172-176)
- Jean-Jacques Dzialowski (#177-178)
- Greg Scott (#179)
- Ramon Bachs (#180-181)
- Tommy Castillo (#185-189)
- Chris Weston (#197-199)
- Steven Cummings (#204-206, 213)
- Ariel Olivetti (#207-211)
- Steve Scott (#212)
- Phil Winslade (#214)

== Collected editions ==
Several of the stories from the title have been collected into trade paperbacks, including the following:

- Batman: Shaman (#1-5), by Dennis O'Neil and Ed Hannigan, ISBN 1-56389-083-6
- Batman: Gothic (#6-10), by Grant Morrison and Klaus Janson, ISBN 1-4012-1549-1
- Batman: Prey (#11-15), by Doug Moench and Paul Gulacy, ISBN 0-446-39521-8
- Batman: Prey (new edition including Batman: Terror (#11-15, #137-141)), by Doug Moench and Paul Gulacy, ISBN 978-1401235154
- Batman: Venom (#16-20), by Dennis O'Neil, Trevor Von Eeden, and José Luis García-López ISBN 1-56389-101-8
- Batman: Faces (#28-30), by Matt Wagner ISBN 1-56389-126-3
- Batman: Collected Legends of the Dark Knight (#32-34, 38, 42-43), ISBN 1-56389-147-6
- Batman: Other Realms (#35-36, 76-78), by Bo and Scott Hampton, ISBN 1-85286-977-1
- World's Funnest (#38 Plus Superman and Batman: World's Funnest, Superman #30, Detective Comics #267: "Batman Meets Bat-Mite", World's Finest #113, Detective Comics #482, The Brave and the Bold #200, Superman Vol. 2 #11, 31, World's Finest Vol. 3 #6, Batman: Mitefall, Superman/Batman #51-52) 978-1401261085
- Batman: Dark Legends (#39-40, 50, 52-54), ISBN 1-56389-266-9
- Batman: KnightsEnd (reprints #62-63 along with material from other titles)
- Batman: Going Sane (#65-68, 200-incorrectly misspelled as 100, as 100 was collected in Robin: The Teen Wonder – see below)
- Batman: Monsters (#71-73, 83-84, 89-90)
- Batman: Blink (#156-158, 164-167)
- Tales of the Batman: J. H. Williams III (#86-88, 192-196, plus Batman #526, 550, 667-669, Batman Annual #21; Chase #7-8; Detective Comics #821)
- Batman: Haunted Knight (Batman: Legends of the Dark Knight Halloween Special; Batman: Madness – A Legends Of The Dark Knight Halloween Special; Batman: Ghosts – A Legends of the Dark Knight Halloween Special)
- Robin: The Teen Wonder (#100, plus Nightwing (vol. 2) #101, Batman #428 and 442, Robin (vol. 4) #126 and 132 and Teen Titans (vol. 3) #29)
- Batman: No Man's Land Vol. 1 (Batman: Legends of the Dark Knight #116-118)
- Batman: No Man's Land Vol. 2 (Batman: Legends of the Dark Knight #119-121)
- Batman: No Man's Land Vol. 3 (Batman: Legends of the Dark Knight #122-124)
- Batman: No Man's Land Vol. 4 (Batman: Legends of the Dark Knight #125-126)
- Batman: The Ring, The Arrow and The Bat (reprints Legends of the DC Universe #7-9 and Batman: Legends of the Dark Knight #127-131), by Dennis O'Neil ISBN 1-4012-0126-1
- Batman: Terror (#137-141), by Doug Moench and Paul Gulacy, ISBN 1-4012-0125-3
- Batman: Under the Cowl (Batman: Legends of the Dark Knight #168)
- Batman: War Games Book One (Batman: Legends of the Dark Knight #182)
- Batman: War Games Book Two (Batman: Legends of the Dark Knight #183)
- Batman: War Games Book Three (Batman: Legends of the Dark Knight #184)
- Batman: Snow (#192-196), written by Dan Curtis Johnson and J. H. Williams III, art by Seth Fisher, ISBN 1-4012-1265-4.
- From 2010-2011, several issues of the title had been collected into 100-page reprint issues/books from DC Comics' revival of the DC Comics Presents title.
- Batman: Four of a Kind (Batman: Legends of the Dark Knight Annual #5)
- Batman: Legends of the Dark Knight Vol. 1 (Legends of the Dark Knight (vol. 2) #1-5)
- Batman: Legends of the Dark Knight Vol. 2 (Legends of the Dark Knight (vol. 2) #6-10)
- Batman: Legends of the Dark Knight Vol. 3 (Legends of the Dark Knight (vol. 2) #11-13, 100-Page Super Spectacular #1)
- Batman: Legends of the Dark Knight Vol. 4 (Legends of the Dark Knight 100-Page Super Spectacular #2-3)
- Batman: Legends of the Dark Knight Vol. 5 (Legends of the Dark Knight 100-Page Super Spectacular #4-5)
- Batman: Legends of the Dark Knight Omnibus Vol. 1 (Upcoming, slotted for June 1st 2027, contains #1-38, Annual #1, Batman #474, and Detective Comics #641)

== Awards ==
Issues #116-126 of the series were part of the No Man's Land storyline, which won the Comics Buyer's Guide Fan Award for Favorite Story for 2000.

== Specials and spin-offs ==
There are three annual Batman: Legends of the Dark Knight Halloween Specials written by Jeph Loeb with art by Tim Sale, which were reprinted in Batman: Haunted Knight; the popularity of these led to the three miniseries Batman: The Long Halloween #1-13, Batman: Dark Victory #0-13 and Catwoman: When in Rome #1-6.

The short-lived series Legends of the DC Universe was based on the concept of Batman: Legends of the Dark Knight, but instead of Batman, it featured a rotating roster of other DC superheroes.

The Batman: Mitefall special used the modern version of Bat-Mite, who first appeared in Batman: Legends of the Dark Knight #38, to parody the Knightfall storyline.

The trade paperback Batman: Four of a Kind chronicles Batman's four first meetings with the Batman villains the Riddler, the Scarecrow, the Man-Bat and Poison Ivy. These stories were printed in the 1995 "Year One" Annuals of the four Batman comic book series of the time: Detective Comics, Batman, Batman: Legends of the Dark Knight and Batman: Shadow of the Bat, respectively.

== See also ==
- "Legends of the Dark Knight" is also the title of an episode from The New Batman Adventures era of Batman: The Animated Series.
- Batman Confidential – a monthly comic series that also tells tales from Batman's past, but deals with more personal events in his career.
