= Class war (disambiguation) =

Class war is political tension and economic antagonism among the social classes of a society.

Class war or class warfare may also refer to:

- Class War, a British anarchist group and newspaper
- Class War (album), by Wisdom in Chains, 2007
- Cla$$war, a comic book limited series
- Class Warfare, a 1996 book of interviews with Noam Chomsky
- Class Warfare (film), a 2001 TV film

== See also ==
- Class Struggle (disambiguation)
- "No War but the Class War", anti-capitalist motto
