= Travel Foreman =

American comic book artist (born 1982)

- Born: 1982 (age 43–44) Honolulu, Hawaii, United States
- Areas: Penciller, Inker
- Notable works: Cla$$war; Ares; The Immortal Iron Fist

Travel Foreman is an American comic book artist.

== Biography ==
Travel Foreman gained attention with his work on Com.x’s Cla$$war, where he replaced original series artist Trevor Hairsine. He quickly moved on to work at Marvel Comics, illustrating the Supreme Power spin-off mini-series, Doctor Spectrum, and a Juggernaut story written by Lee Barnett in X-Men Unlimited #4.

He has also worked on the Ares: God of War limited series. He drew covers for Ms. Marvel and took over pencilling duties from David Aja on the Iron Fist series.

Foreman has also done work for DC Comics in their "The New 52" relaunch. He initially provided art for Animal Man, working alongside writer Jeff Lemire before moving to Birds of Prey. On Birds of Prey, Foreman collaborated with Duane Swierczynski, who he had previously worked with on Marvel's The Immortal Iron Fist.

He then drew comic books for Marvel Comics again: from The Ultimates to Civil War II: The Amazing Spider-Man. He later worked on the ongoing Black Cat series with writer Jed MacKay.

== Bibliography ==
Interior comic work includes:

- Arkanium #5 (with Brandon M. Easton, Dreamwave Productions, 2003)
- Cla$$war #4-6 (with Rob Williams, Com.x, 2004)
- X-Men Unlimited vol. 2 #4: "Testing Times" (with Lee Barnett, anthology, Marvel, 2004)
- Doctor Spectrum #1-5 (of 6): "Full Spectrum" (with Sara Barnes, Marvel MAX, 2004–2005)
- Ares #1-5: "God of War" (with Michael Avon Oeming, Marvel, 2006)
- Star Wars: Legacy #4: "Noob" (with John Ostrander, Dark Horse, 2006)
- Star Wars: Knights of the Old Republic #5: "Commencement, Part Five" (with John Jackson Miller, Dark Horse, 2006)
- The Immortal Iron Fist (Marvel):
  - "The Last Iron Fist Story" (with Ed Brubaker, Matt Fraction, David Aja, John Severin, Russ Heath, Jr. and Sal Buscema, in #1-5, 2007)
  - "The Pirate Queen of Pinghai Bay" (with Ed Brubaker, Matt Fraction, Leandro Fernandez and Khari Evans, in #7, 2007)
  - "The Mortal Iron Fist" (with Duane Swierczynski and Russ Heath, Jr., in #17-20, 2008–2009)
  - "Escape from the Eighth City" (with Duane Swierczynski, Timothy Green II, Tonči Zonjić and Juan Doe, in #22-23 and 25-26, 2009)
  - "The Fall of the House of Rand" (with Duane Swierczynski, Timothy Green II and David Lapham, in #27, 2009)
- Infinity, Inc. vol. 2 #3: "Luthor's Monsters, Part Three" (with Peter Milligan and Max Fiumara, DC Comics, 2008)
- Countdown Presents: The Search for Ray Palmer — Red Son (with Alan Burnett, one-shot, DC Comics, 2008)
- Immortal Weapons #1-2: "The Caretakers" (with Duane Swierczynski, anthology, Marvel, 2009)
- Superman #710: "Grounded, Part Eight" (with Chris Roberson and Eddy Barrows, DC Comics, 2011)
- Animal Man vol. 2 #1-8, 29, Annual #2 (with Jeff Lemire, John Paul Leon (#6) and Steve Pugh (#7-8), DC Comics, 2011–2014)
- Birds of Prey vol. 3 #9-11 (with Duane Swierczynski and Timothy Green II (#11), DC Comics, 2012)
- Action Comics vol. 2 #13: "The Ghost in the Fortress of Solitude" (with Grant Morrison, DC Comics, 2012)
- Secret Origins vol. 3 #8: "The Secret Origin of Animal Man" (with Jeff Lemire and Duffy Boudreau, anthology, DC Comics, 2015)
- Justice League United #11-12, 16 (with Jeff Parker, DC Comics, 2015–2016)
- Constantine vol. 2 #10-11 (with James Tynion IV and Ming Doyle, DC Comics, 2016)
- Civil War II: The Amazing Spider-Man #1-4 (with Christos Gage, Marvel, 2016)
- Ultimates^{2} #1-6, 9, 100 (with Al Ewing and Filipe Andrade (#100), Marvel, 2016–2017)
- Tales of Suspense #100-104: "Hawkeye and Winter Soldier" (with Matthew Rosenberg, Marvel, 2018)
- Astonishing X-Men vol. 4 Annual #1: "Who We are" (with Matthew Rosenberg, Marvel, 2018)
- Daughters of the Dragon vol. 2 #1, 3 (with Jed MacKay, digital, Marvel, 2018–2019)
- Marvel Knights 20th #1, 6 (with Donny Cates and Kim Jacinto (#6), Marvel, 2019)
- Electric Warriors #1-6 (with Steve Orlando and Javi Fernández (#5), DC Comics, 2019)
- Black Cat vol. 3 #1-5, 7 (with Jed MacKay and Michael Dowling (#3), Marvel, 2019–2020)

=== Covers only ===
- Ms. Marvel vol. 2 #11 (Marvel, 2006)
- The Immortal Iron Fist #11 (Marvel, 2008)
- Sif #1 (Marvel, 2010)
- Black Widow vol. 5 #1, 6-8 (Marvel, 2010–2011)
- Rescue #1 (Marvel, 2010)
- Iron Man: Legacy #5 (Marvel, 2010)
- Tomb of Terror #1 (Marvel, 2010)
- Loki vol. 2 #1-4 (Marvel, 2010–2011)
- Superman/Batman #81-84 (DC Comics, 2011)
- Animal Man vol. 2 #9-10, Annual #1 (DC Comics, 2012)
- Sweet Tooth #29 (Vertigo, 2012)
- Suicide Squad vol. 4 #19 (DC Comics, 2013)
- Swamp Thing vol. 5 #24, Annual #2 (DC Comics, 2013)
- The Death-Defying Doctor Mirage #1-3 (Valiant, 2014)
- Unity #1-2 (Valiant, 2014)
- The Eighth Seal #1-3 (IDW Publishing, 2015–2016)
- 4001 A.D.: Shadowman #1 (Valiant, 2016)
- Prowler vol. 2 #1-6 (Marvel, 2016–2017)
- Shadowman vol. 5 #1 (Valiant, 2018)
- Marvel 2099: Spider-Man #1 (Marvel, 2020)
