= Indiana Jones and the Tomb of the Gods =

- Issue #1 cover art

Publication information
- Publisher: Dark Horse Comics
- Schedule: Monthly
- Format: Limited series
- Publication date: June 2008 - March 2009
- No. of issues: Four

Creative team
- Created by: George Lucas
- Written by: Rob Williams
- Artist(s): Steve Scott; Bart Sears; Nathan Massengill

Indiana Jones and the Tomb of the Gods is a Dark Horse Comics limited series based on the fictional archaeologist Indiana Jones.

== Plot ==
=== Part One ===
In 1931, archaeologists Henrik Mellberg, Francis Beresford-Hope, and Marwell O'Brien discover the Key to the Tomb of the Gods in Norilsk, and divide it between them. Five years later, the Ahnenerbe, led by Friedrich Von Hassell, have captured O'Brien's piece. Mellberg sends a letter to Indiana Jones to come to his Manhattan apartment to help, but the Nazis are there and interrogate him. A maid interrupts, causing Jones to escape with Mellberg through a secret passage. Mellberg is fatally shot and gives his part of the key to Jones, only to be forced at gunpoint by the maid, who is actually treasure hunter Janice Le Roi, to give it to her. Jones and Marcus Brody fly to Lhasa to track down Beresford-Hope, who took refuge in the mountains and died. While inspecting the cave he lived in, Beresford-Hope's son Alex, who protects his father's secret, throws dynamite at Jones and Brody because he fears they are Nazis.

=== Part Two ===
The archaeologists survive and clear-up the misunderstanding, and all three flee on Jock Lindsey's plane when bandits attack. Alex gives them his father's piece, which contains a map pointing to the Tomb's location in Siberia.

Brody gives Jones dynamite, telling him whatever is contained in the Tomb must be destroyed. Jones disagrees, and is just as eager as the Nazis to discover the Tomb. He and Alex take a ship from Shanghai to travel to Siberia. While stopping in Japan, he is confronted by Von Hassell and Le Roi, who is now in the Nazis' pay. After taking the final piece of the Key, Von Hassell betrays Le Roi and cuts her arm, placing her and Jones in a boat with no oars. Von Hassell shoots the boat, and pushes it out to water, where Le Roi's blood will attract sharks.

=== Part Three ===
Jones escapes by removing his and Le Roi's shirts and lighting them, creating a signal that leads Brody and a whaling ship to rescue them. Jones, Le Roi, and Brody sail on the ship to Siberia, using the respective copies Jones and Le Roi made of their portions of the map on the key. There, they engage with Von Hassell's team in a sledge chase, when all of them fall into a chasm opened by a crack of lightning.

=== Part Four ===
Jones survives the fall and is met by Le Roi, who leads him to a cavern. There, Von Hassell has discovered the door to the Tomb, and pressures Alex to open it, but he refuses. Von Hassell then kills him, and tells Brody to open the door, but suddenly three of Von Hassell's men are possessed, and kill almost everyone with their machine guns. Jones defeats the men and rescues Brody, and with a horrifying sound, Von Hassell opens the door himself, to reveal a bottomless pit. Jones then realizes that Brody was right, and shoves Von Hassell into the pit with the dynamite. The explosion destroys the Tomb, and Jones escapes, along with Brody and Le Roi.

== Background ==
Writer Rob Williams noted Indiana Jones' in Raiders of the Lost Ark and Indiana Jones and the Temple of Doom is very different, pointing out a scene in Raiders where Jones lowers his bazooka aimed at the Nazis, declaring he would give up the Ark of the Covenant for Marion Ravenwood. Williams felt Jones from the prequel Temple of Doom would not do this, so he wanted to explore why Jones becomes less materialistic.

Williams created a new group of characters to lend the new run of Dark Horse Comics' Indiana Jones comics in its own tone, but also used Marcus Brody, who is his favorite element of Indiana Jones and the Last Crusade. He chose the Ahnenerbe (which Heinrich Himmler founded) to make the comic "not just Indy versus your typical Nazi goons, [but] Indy up against his counterparts from within the Nazi party". He promised they would be recurring enemies, in a need to give Jones "his own Doctor Doom or Joker".
