= John Higgins (comics) =

English comic book artist and writer

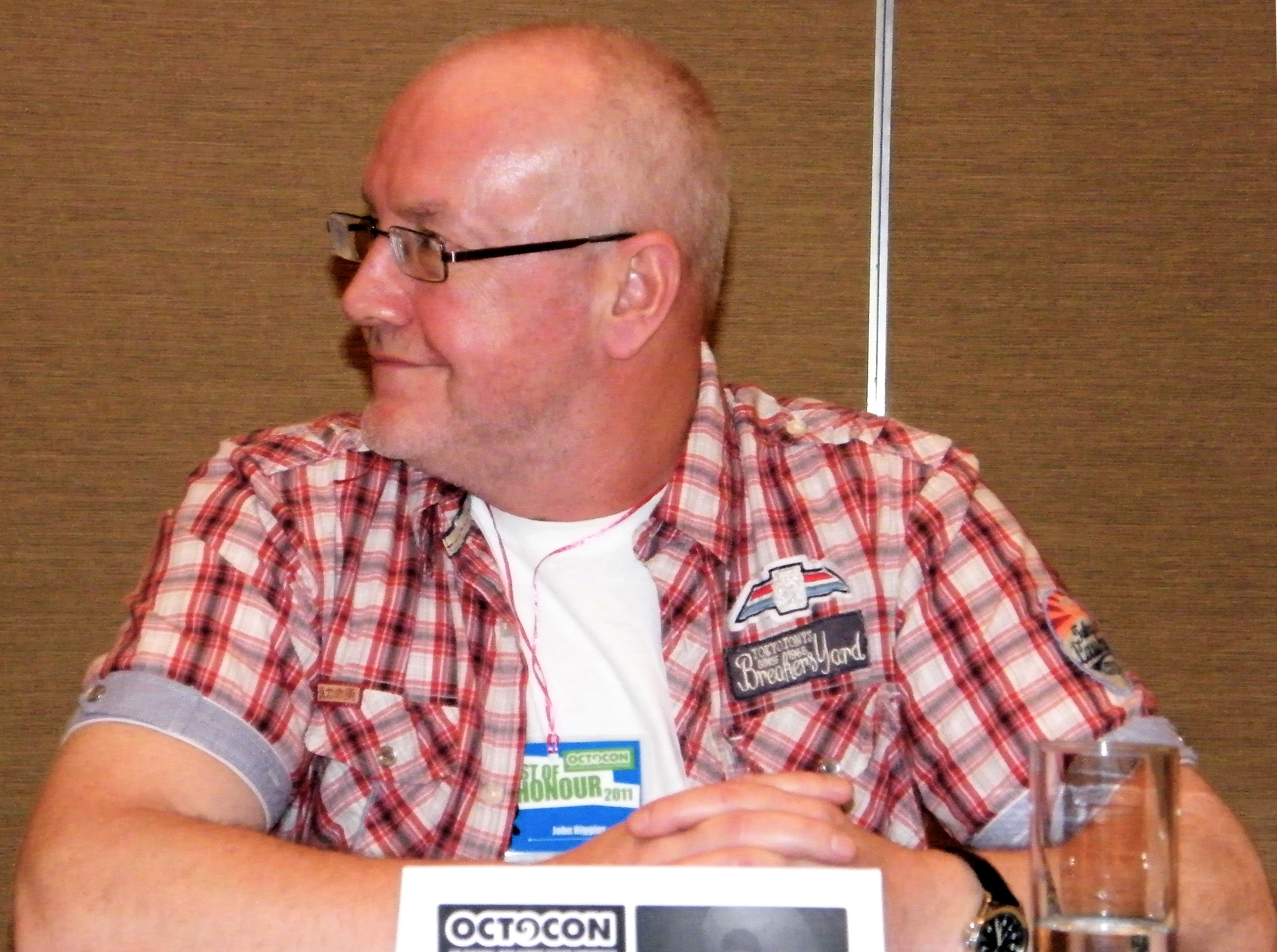
- Guest of Honour at Octocon, Ireland
- Born: 1949 (age 76–77) Walton, Liverpool, England, UK
- Areas: Writer, Penciller, Inker, Colourist
- Notable works: Batman: The Killing Joke; Razorjack; Watchmen
- Awards: Inkpot Award (2011)

John Higgins (born 1949) is an English comic book artist and writer. He did significant work for 2000 AD, and he has frequently worked with writer Alan Moore, most notably as colourist for Watchmen.

== Biography ==
John Higgins was born in Walton, Liverpool. After leaving school when he was 15, he joined the army and, on leaving, spent some time in a commune in Wiltshire. He returned to Liverpool and, in 1971, resumed his studies at Wallasey College of Art. There, in 1974 he qualified in technical illustration, which allowed him to get a job as a medical illustrator at The Royal Marsden NHS Foundation Trust.

After getting his first comic book art published in Brainstorm Comix in 1975, he drew the cover for 2000 AD No. 43 in 1977 and decided to go freelance in 1978, with an eye on becoming a comic artist. In 1981 he started getting regular work at 2000 AD, one of his early projects being the art for a Tharg's Future Shocks by Alan Moore, as well as doing covers for Marvel UK.

After this he worked steadily at 2000 AD and joined the British Invasion in the mid-eighties—notably doing the colouring on Moore's Watchmen and Batman: The Killing Joke, a job he got through colouring Steve Dillon's art on Moore's ABC Warriors story. This led to more work in the American market, although he has kept working on British titles too, especially with Judge Dredd over 20 years.

He provided the art for Greysuit with Pat Mills, as well as working with Justin Gray and Jimmy Palmiotti on The Hills Have Eyes: The Beginning and Jonah Hex No. 28.

Higgins is also a writer. He wrote and drew his first Future Shock at 2000 AD and did the same for Razorjack, a comic book mini-series from Com.x, which was reprinted in 2009.

Higgins has worked in a number of different areas providing artwork for animation, film and book covers like The Cabinet of Light and The Morgaine Stories. In 2012, Higgins worked on the Before Watchmen project, drawing the serialised feature "Curse of the Crimson Corsair" which was initially written by Len Wein. Higgins later became the writer of the feature as well.

In 2016 he provided the art for six stamps commemorating the Great Fire of London, illustrating them in the style of a comic strip.

In 2017 a collection of his artwork was exhibited at the Victoria Gallery & Museum in Liverpool, in an exhibition called Beyond Dredd & Watchmen: The Art of John Higgins.

== Awards ==
Higgins received an Inkpot Award in 2011.

== Bibliography ==
Comics work includes:

- Brainstorm No. 5 (1975)
- Brainstorm Fantasy Comix No. 1: "TIT Company" (script and art, 1977)
- Graphixus No. 5 "Barbarian" (1978)
- Battlestar Galactica:
  - Battlestar Galactica Annual (art on various stories, Grandreams, 1978)
  - Mission Galactica Annual (art on various stories, Grandreams, 1980)
- Tharg's Future Shocks:
  - "Together" (script and art, in 2000 AD No. 108, 1979)
  - "The Last Rumble of the Platinum Horde" (with Alan Moore, in 2000 AD No. 217, 1981)
  - "Salad Days" (with Alan Moore, in 2000 AD No. 247, 1982)
  - "Horn of Plenty!" (with Kelvin Gosnell, in 2000 AD No. 248, 1982)
  - "The Bounty Hunters" (with Alan Moore, in 2000 AD No. 253, 1982)
  - "No Picnic" (with Alan Moore, in 2000 AD No. 272, 1982)
  - "Car Wars" (with Peter Milligan, in 2000 AD No. 434, 1985)
  - "Project Salvation" (with Peter Milligan, in 2000 AD No. 436, 1985)
- One-Off:
  - "Last Thought" (with Steve MacManus, in 2000 AD No. 202, 1981)
  - "Hot Item" (with Alan Moore, in 2000 AD No. 278, 1982)
- Joe Black (with Kelvin Gosnell):
  - "Joe Black's Tall Tale!" (in 2000 AD No. 241, 1981)
  - "The Hume Factor" (in 2000 AD No. 252, 1982)
  - "Joe Black's Big Bunco" (in 2000 AD No. 56, 1982)
- Time Twisters (with Alan Moore):
  - "Einstein" (in 2000 AD No. 309, 1983)
  - "The Startling Success of Sideways Scuttleton" (in 2000 AD No. 327, 1983)
- Grailquest (with James Herbert Brennan):
1. The Castle of Darkness (1984)
2. The Den of Dragons (1984)
3. The Gateway of Doom (1984)
4. Voyage of Terror (1986)
5. Kingdom of Horror (1986)
6. Realm of Chaos (1987)
7. Tomb of Nightmares (1987)
8. Legion of the Dead (1987)
- ABC Warriors: "Red Planet Blues" (colours, short story, with writer Alan Moore and art by Steve Dillon, in 2000 AD Annual 1985, 1984)
- Judge Dredd:
  - "Crime Call" (with John Wagner/Alan Grant, in Judge Dredd Annual 1986, 1985)
  - "Beggars' Banquet" (with John Wagner/Alan Grant, in 2000 AD No. 456, 1986)
  - "Letter From a Democrat" (with John Wagner/Alan Grant, in 2000 AD No. 460, 1986)
  - "The Exploding Man" (with John Wagner/Alan Grant, in 2000 AD No. 471, 1986)
  - "Russell's Inflatable Muscles" (with John Wagner/Alan Grant, in 2000 AD No. 480, 1986)
  - "Phantom of the Shoppera" (with John Wagner/Alan Grant, in 2000 AD #494–495, 1986)
  - "On the Superslab" (with John Wagner/Alan Grant, in 2000 AD No. 504, 1986)
  - "Revolution" (with John Wagner/Alan Grant, in 2000 AD #531–533, 1986)
  - "Oz" (with John Wagner/Alan Grant, in 2000 AD #564–565, 1987)
  - "Last of the Bad Guys" (with John Wagner, in Judge Dredd Annual 1988, 1987)
  - "The Blob" (with Alan Grant, in Judge Dredd Mega Special 1988)
  - "Joe Dredd's Blues" (with John Wagner/Alan Grant, in 2000 AD Annual 1989, 1988)
  - "Breakdown on 9th Street" (with John Wagner, in 2000 AD #620–621, 1989)
  - "The Shooting Match" (with John Wagner, in 2000 AD No. 650, 1989)
  - "Ex-Men" (with Garth Ennis, in 2000 AD No. 818, 1993)
  - "Scales of Justice" (script and art, in 2000 AD #884–885, 1994)
  - "Casualties of War" (with John Wagner, in 2000 AD No. 900, 1994)
  - "Caught Short " (with John Wagner, in 2000 AD No. 953, 1995)
  - "My Son the Hero" (with John Wagner, in 2000 AD No. 955, 1995)
  - "Generation Killer" (with John Wagner, in 2000 AD #1212, 2000)
  - "Citizen Sump" (with John Wagner, in Judge Dredd Megazine #4.12–4.12, 2002)
  - "Monkey on My Back" (with Garth Ennis, in Judge Dredd Megazine #204–206, 2003)
  - "Fat Christmas" (with John Wagner, in Judge Dredd Megazine No. 227, 2005)
  - "What's Another Year?" (with Al Ewing, in Judge Dredd Megazine No. 292, 2009)
  - "Tour of Duty: The Talented Mayor Ambrose" (with John Wagner, in 2000 AD #1674–1678, 1684–1685, March–May 2010)
  - "Idle Hands" (with Al Ewing, in Judge Dredd Megazine No. 303, November 2010)
  - "Served Cold" (with Al Ewing, in 2000 AD #1718–1725, January–March 2011)
  - "Unchained" (with Michael Carroll, in Judge Dredd Megazine #316–317, November–December 2011)
- Zoids Special #1: "A War Between Blue and Red Zoids on Planet Zoidstar" (inks, with writer Steve Parkhouse and pencils by Johnny Aldrich, Marvel UK, 1986)
- Watchmen (colours, with Alan Moore and art by Dave Gibbons, DC Comics, 1986–1987)
- Freaks:
  - "Freaks" (with Peter Milligan, in 2000 AD #542–547, 1987)
  - "Faces" (art and co-authored with Mindy Newell, in 2000 AD #1412–1419, 2004)
- Batman: The Killing Joke (colours, with Alan Moore, and art by Brian Bolland, DC Comics, 1988)
- Doctor Who: "Follow that TARDIS!" (with John Carnell, Doctor Who Magazine No. 147, 1989)
- Death's Head (with Simon Furman):
  - "Do Not Forsake Me Oh My Darling!" (Death's Head No. 5, Marvel UK, 1989)
  - "Clobberin' Time!" (pencils, with inks by Geoff Senior, Death's Head No. 5, Marvel UK, 1989)
  - "Keepsake" (The Incomplete Death's Head #4–5, 1993)
- World Without End (with Jamie Delano, six-issue mini-series, DC Comics, 1990–1991)
- The Thing from Another World (with Chuck Pfarrer, two-issue mini-series, 1991–1992, Dark Horse Comics, collected in Thing from Another World and Climate of Fear, 1993, ISBN 1-878574-85-X)
- The Spider (with Mark Millar and David Hine, in 2000 AD Action Special, 1992)
- Mutatis (with Dan Abnett/Andy Lanning, three-issue mini-series, Epic Comics, 1992)
- Scarlet Witch (with Dan Abnett/Andy Lanning, four-issue mini-series, Marvel Comics, 1994)
- Batman: "Storm" (with Andrew Donkin and Graham Brand, Batman: Legends of the Dark Knight No. 58, DC Comics, 1994)
- What If...? vol. 2 #65: "What if Archangel fell from grace?" (pencils, with Simon Furman and inks by Martin Griffiths, Marvel Comics, 1994)
- Blood Syndicate #24: "Things Fall Apart" (pencils, with Ivan Velez Jr. and inks by Bobby Rae, Milestone Media, 1995)
- Chopper: "Supersurf 13" (with Alan McKenzie, 2000 AD #964–971, 1995)
- Vector 13: "Case Two: Trinity" (with Simon Furman, in 2000 AD #989, 1996)
- Hellblazer #129–139:
  - Son of Man (with Garth Ennis, Vertigo, 1998–1999, tpb collects #129–133, 2004, Titan Books, ISBN 1-84023-830-5, DC Comics, ISBN 1-4012-0202-0)
  - Haunted (with Warren Ellis, Vertigo, 1999, tpb collects #134–139, Titan Books, ISBN 1-84023-362-1, DC Comics, ISBN 1-56389-813-6)
- Razorjack (script and art, two-issue mini-series, Com.x, 2001, tpb, 100 pages, March 2009, ISBN 1-60743-817-8)
- Pride & Joy (with Garth Ennis, four-issue limited series, Vertigo, tpb, 2003 ISBN 1-4012-0190-3)
- War Story: "D-Day Dodgers" (with Garth Ennis, one-shot, Vertigo, 2001, collected in tpb War Stories: Volume 1, 2004, ISBN 1-84023-912-3)
- Identity Disc (pencils, with Robert Rodi and inks by Sandu Florea, five-issue mini-series, Marvel Comics, 2004, tpb, ISBN 0-7851-1567-6)
- Thunderbolt Jaxon (with Dave Gibbons, five-issue mini-series, 2006, Wildstorm, tpb, 2007, ISBN 1-4012-1257-3)
- Meet Darren Dead (with Rob Williams):
  - "Meet Darren Dead" (in Judge Dredd Megazine No. 240, 2006)
  - "Eats, Shoots & Kills" (in Judge Dredd Megazine #287–289, 2009)
- The Hills Have Eyes: The Beginning (with Jimmy Palmiotti and Justin Gray, Fox Atomic Comics, 2007, ISBN 978-0-0612-4354-7)
- Greysuit (with Pat Mills):
  - "Project Monarch" (in 2000 AD #1540–1549, 2007)
  - "The Old Man of the Mountains" (in 2000 AD Prog 2009 and #1617–1624, 2008–2009)
- Jonah Hex No. 28 (with Jimmy Palmiotti and Justin Gray, DC Comics, February 2008)
- The Boys: We Gotta Go Now (with Darick Robertson and Garth Ennis, 2008–2009) ISBN 978-1-6069-0035-2)
- Before Watchmen "Curse of the Crimson Corsair" backup feature (with Len Wein, DC Comics, August 2012 – February 2013)
  - Before Watchmen: Minutemen #1 "The Devil in the Deep... Part One" Artist August 2012
  - Before Watchmen: Silk Spectre #1 "The Devil in the Deep... Part Two" Artist August 2012
  - Before Watchmen: Comedian #1 "The Devil in the Deep... Part Three" Artist August 2012
  - Before Watchmen: Nite Owl #1 "The Devil in the Deep... Part Four" Artist August 2012
  - Before Watchmen: Ozymandias #1 "The Devil in the Deep... Part Five" Artist September 2012
  - Before Watchmen: Minutemen #2 "The Devil in the Deep... Part Six" Artist September 2012
  - Before Watchmen: Silk Spectre #2 "The Devil in the Deep... Part Seven" Artist September 2012
  - Before Watchmen: Comedian #2 "The Devil in the Deep... Part Eight" Artist September 2012
  - Before Watchmen: Nite Owl #2 "The Devil in the Deep... Part Nine" Artist October 2012
  - Before Watchmen: Ozymandias #2 "The Devil in the Deep... Part Ten" Artist October 2012
  - Before Watchmen: Rorschach #1 "The Evil That Men Do... Part One" Artist October 2012
  - Before Watchmen: Dr. Manhattan #1 "The Evil That Men Do... Part Two" Writer/Artist October 2012
  - Before Watchmen: Minutemen #3 "The Evil That Men Do... Part Three" Writer/Artist October 2012
  - Before Watchmen: Silk Spectre #3 "The Evil That Men Do... Part Four" Writer/Artist November 2012
  - Before Watchmen: Comedian #3 "The Evil That Men Do... Part Five" Writer/Artist November 2012
  - Before Watchmen: Nite Owl #3 "The Evil That Men Do... Part Six" Writer/Artist November 2012
  - Before Watchmen: Ozymandias #3 "The Evil That Men Do... Part Seven" Writer/Artist November 2012
  - Before Watchmen: Rorschach #2 "The Evil That Men Do... Part Eight" Writer/Artist December 2012
  - Before Watchmen: Dr. Manhattan #2 "Wide Were His Dragon Wings Part One" Writer/Artist December 2012
  - Before Watchmen: Minutemen #4 "Wide Were His Dragon Wings Part Two" Writer/Artist December 2012
  - Before Watchmen: Silk Spectre #4 "Wide Were His Dragon Wings Part Three" Writer/Artist December 2012
  - Before Watchmen: Comedian #4 "Wide Were His Dragon Wings Part Six" Writer/Artist December 2012
  - Before Watchmen: Moloch #1 "Wide Were His Dragon Wings Part Four" Writer/Artist January 2013
  - Before Watchmen: Ozymandias #4 "Wide Were His Dragon Wings Part Five" Writer/Artist January 2013
  - Before Watchmen: Rorschach #3 "Wide Were His Dragon Wings Part Eight" Writer/Artist January 2013
  - Before Watchmen: Dr. Manhattan #3 "Wide Were His Dragon Wings Part Nine" Writer/Artist January 2013
  - Before Watchmen: Minutemen #5 "Wide Were His Dragon Wings Part Seven" Writer/Artist February 2013
  - Before Watchmen: Moloch #2 "Wide Were His Dragon Wings Conclusion" Writer/Artist February 2013
