= Ares (comic book) =

2006 Marvel Comics - limited series

- Cover to Ares #1. Art by Travel Foreman.

Publication information
- Publisher: Marvel Comics
- Format: Limited series
- Genre: Superhero; Mythology
- Publication date: March – July 2006
- No. of issues: 5
- Main character(s): Ares; Hercules; Zeus; Achilles

Creative team
- Written by: Michael Avon Oeming
- Penciller: Travel Foreman
- Inker: Derek Fridolfs
- Letterer: Joe Caramagna
- Colorist: Len O'Grady

Collected editions
- Ares: God of War: ISBN 978-0-7851-1991-3

Ares is a 2006 Marvel Comics comic book limited series starring the character of the same name is written by Michael Avon Oeming and pencilled by Travel Foreman.

== Plot summary ==
After abandoning the Olympian pantheon, the Greek god Ares poses as a mortal, raising his son Alexander. When Alexander is kidnapped by Ares' father Zeus and then captured by the evil Japanese god Amatsu-Mikaboshi, Ares joins forces with Zeus and half-brother Hercules to rescue his son.

== Collected editions ==
The series is collected in the trade paperback Ares: God of War (ISBN 978-0785119913).
