= Cla$$war =

2002–2004 comic book limited series

- Cover art for the Cla$$war hardcover collections. Pencilled by Trevor Hairsine with colouring by Len O'Grady

Publication information
- Publisher: Com.x
- Schedule: Monthly
- Format: Limited series
- Genre: Superhero
- Publication date: January–July 2002 (1–3); March–June 2004 (4–6)
- No. of issues: 6
- Main character(s): The American; Isaac; Icon; Burner; Heavyweight; Confusion; Young American; George W. Bush

Creative team
- Created by: Rob Williams; Trevor Hairsine
- Written by: Rob Williams
- Artist(s): Trevor Hairsine (1–3); Travel Foreman (4–6)
- Letterer: Ed Deighton
- Colourist: Len O'Grady
- Editor: Ed Deighton

Collected editions
- Series One: Complete Edition: ISBN 1-60743-816-X

Cla$$war is a six-issue comic book limited series published by Com.x between 2002 and 2004. It was written by Rob Williams with art by Trevor Hairsine and Travel Foreman.

Williams has summed up the story as "a political thriller with superheroes," dealing with a government supersoldier programme and how the leading superhero, The American, deals with the revelation of the truth.

== Publication history ==
The series, written by Rob Williams with art by Trevor Hairsine, was due to be launched in November 2001, but had to be delayed because of the 9/11 attacks. The first three issues were finally published between January and July 2002 and were collected into a trade paperback in 2003. When the publisher came back from a hiatus caused by problems including a serious burglary, Hairsine had already moved on to Marvel and, while Cary Nord was initially pencilled in as his replacement, a job that finally went to Travel Foreman and the last three issue were published between March and June 2004. Len O'Grady provided all the colouring to "maintain colour continuity". When the publisher returned fully to publishing the series was collected into a hardcover edition.

Although people make the link with The Authority, Williams has said he had not read the series before starting to write Cla$$war and he went on to explain the actual inspiration:

Cla$$war was influenced by my love of people like Noam Chomsky - I was reading his Class Warfare when I came up with the idea for the series - and Bill Hicks, my fascination with Nixon and American politics in general. I spend half my time reading books on subjects like the CIA, biographies of people like Martin Luther King. For some reason I'm captivated by US history over the past 50 years

...

I also love intelligent superhero comics - a legacy from my dysfunctional youth and the effect Alan Moore's Captain Britain and Marvelman had on me in the early eighties. So I figured I'd combine the two.

The series was always planned to run for twelve issues, and Williams has expressed an interest in writing the next six-issue story arc but he is concerned that "with the production quality and level of artist that the series has had in its different incarnations - it's really tough to sustain that over another six issues unless you're selling large numbers, and for an indie company like com.x that's tough to achieve."

== Reception ==
The reviews have largely been positive, apart from complaints about scheduling. Michael Deeley reviewed the first issue for Comics Bulletin declared that it was a "this is a solid first issue for what promises to be an exciting and challenging story," with "tight" writing and "great art," the latter reminding him of "Gene Colan, but with a grittier texture." The X-Axis thought it was an "impressive package" and the review at Sequential Tart complimented the "gorgeous" art and drew on the comparisons, saying "where The Authority deals with interdimensional war and interstellar invasion, Cla$$war is much more personal and immediate." Craig Lemon covered issue #2 for Comics Bulletin and concluded "a great title, a real breath of fresh air into a tired genre, one that doesn't rely on the shock value of revealing secret identities, or of constantly changing powers and/or costumes," suggesting some parallels with John Smith's New Statesmen. Lemon returns for the third issue and suggests that "Rob Williams is really beginning to get into this scripting lark, hitting his stride with spot-on dialogue and humorous asides amid the serious plot." Lemon also reviewed the trade collection of the first three issues, concluding that "a cracking script to go with his detailed plot, the right mixture of tension, intrigue plus humour" and that it "shows [Hairsine's] work off to its best effect, the amount of effort he put in is all there on the page...complemented by Len O'Grady's excellent colouring work," although he did point out problems with spelling errors.

When the series recommenced, Lemon picked up the review again concluding that the fourth issue was "a bit like Supreme-Power-to-the-MAX, ideal for fans of that book or Rising Stars, or for anyone who demands a little more ... intelligence ... from their superheroes." After the highpoint of the previous issue "#5 really just moves us from the bad guys looking for The American, to the confrontation itself" although "it still works and reads very well." Craig Johnson reviewed the last issue for Comics Bulletin and suggested "you have a book which comes close to out-Authoritying The Authority, out-Ultimating The Ultimates." The X-Axis was less impressed, suggesting that the scheduling made it miss the window where the story's politics were truly relevant: "by this point Cla$$war seems like a strangely contradiction - simultaneously a hamfisted anti-government rant, and a curious relic of a more innocent pre-9/11 era when you actually had to make up silly conspiracy theories to justify broadsiding the US government."

SFX reviewed the complete collection and found itself agreeing and disagreeing with Craig Johnson's introduction to the book: "[s]o Johnson's right, if you don't have V for Vendetta, order it at once. But if you do, Cla$$war should be the next book on your must-buy list." Troy Brownfield at Newsarama felt that "Rob Williams doesn't flinch when he puts a cold eye to this idea, and it's his willingness to stare deeply that gives the story its fire" and that "lend some terrific art to the proceedings" before concluding that the volume is "an action-packed super-hero tale with resonance and relevance." Ain't it Cool News was impressed with Hairsine's art, suggesting he "deserves a blowjob while eating ice cream for this work," and they felt that the change of artists was not the problem it could have been, "[s]ure you knew it was a different guy, but he embodied the predecessor so well you just thought it was the original artist trying something new." They were also impressed with the story and the presentation of the hardcover volume, concluding "[o]verall the series is a powerhouse and this new hardcover collection certainly rocks - especially with an incredible amount of extras thrown in," with their main concern being that the series was planned for twelve issues, so the volume is only the first story arc:

There's a great build-up that launches into six amazing issues. It's a powerful story that hits you like a ton of bricks no matter how any times you read it. Yet the series simply ends after issue six. No new issues as of yet. It is a series that begs to be told and hopefully as the cover reads this is 'Series One' perhaps a 'Series Two' may be on the horizon. Now is that so bad? The lone gripe being I want more? No it is not. It is the sure tell sign of a comic book that has deeply impacted my psyche.

== Collected editions ==
The series has been collected into two trade paperbacks. The first was released in 2003 and brought together the three issues that had been published at that point and the second collects the entire six issues:

- Cla$$war: Series One: Complete Edition (collects Cla$$war #1-6, 210 pages, March 2009, ISBN 1-60743-816-X)

This volume also contains a number of extras: introductions by Andy Diggle and Craig Johnson, a new eight-page prologue by Williams and Hairsine, posters by Ben Oliver (Burner) and Mike McMahon (Enola Gay), as well as Oliver's cover for the unpublished trade paperback collecting Cla$$war #4-6.

== Film adaptation ==
It was announced at the 2009 Long Beach Comic Con that the series has been optioned by Mandeville Films, the production company that made the film Surrogates based on the comic book of the same name. Rick Alexander, David Hoberman and Todd Lieberman will be the co-producers.
