= Caballistics, Inc. =

Horror fantasy story

Publication information
- Publisher: Rebellion/2000 AD
- First appearance: "Going Underground" (January 2003)
- Created by: Gordon Rennie; Dom Reardon

In-story information
- Type of business: Paranormal investigations
- Base(s): Exham Priory
- Owner(s): Ethan Kostabi
- Employee(s): Solomon Ravne; Jenny Simmons; Hannah Chapter; Lawrence Verse; Mikey Ness; Howard Slater; Jonathan Brand

Caballistics, Inc is a horror/fantasy story, set in the present day, that has been running in the weekly British anthology comic 2000 AD since December 2002. The strip was created by writer Gordon Rennie and artist Dom Reardon (the latter of whom has been the sole artist on the strip since its inception).

It spawned a spin-off, Absalom, based around Inspector Harry Absalom (given as "Absolam" in Caballistics, Inc), written by Rennie with art by Tiernen Trevallion.

== Plot ==
In 2004, Department Q, a Ministry of Defence department originally created in the 1940s to combat Nazi occult warfare, is privatised by the British government. The Department, by then consisting only of the crusty paranormal historian Dr Jonathan Brand and his assistant Jennifer Simmons, is bought by Ethan Kostabi, a reclusive multi-millionaire 1970s pop star. Kostabi announces that he has contracted their services as part of a new private ghost-busting outfit, to be known as Caballistics, Inc., and introduces them to their teammates, freelance occult investigators Hannah Chapter and Lawrence Verse. Even before the official press release for the new company can be sent out, the team is called to deal with a major paranormal infestation on the London Underground, where they meet the fifth member of the team, the powerful and seemingly evil Solomon Ravne. The team go on to investigate various paranormal phenomena, suffering from internal conflicts and divided loyalties, and all the while it is suggested that Kostabi has some ultimate plan in mind for the team beyond that which any of them expect.

Caballistics, Inc. has an extremely dark tone. Several recurring characters have been unexpectedly killed off, and there is a degree of brutality unusual for a British comic magazine. Early in the series, Simmons was possessed by a powerful demon, a state that continues to this day. More recently, Brand, usually identified by fans as the 'good' member of the team, was pushed under a Tube train by another member, Mikey Ness.

Events within the team came to a head when - after three years of intrigue and suspicion - they were eventually pushed into confrontation with their erstwhile employer. At least three members of the team were killed in the ensuing battle in addition to Kostabi himself, with only Ravne and Simmons known to have walked away unharmed. With the ultimate fates of the only two other members being left highly ambiguous, this effectively marked the end of the organisation. Besides an epilogue, "Nativity", in late 2007, the remaining plot threads would be taken up in a spin-off series, Absalom, beginning in 2011, and followed characters that had previously appeared in minor supporting roles in Caballistics, Inc.

Caballistics contains many overt references to both Doctor Who and Quatermass. The strip also contains many passing references to other cult television, film and literary mythologies alongside various religious traditions. Among the many mentions are Gnosticism, Kabbalah, the Rosicrucians, the Tetragrammaton, Opus Dei, Zoroastrianism, the Illuminati, paranormal warfare in World War II, the Thule Society, Aleister Crowley, Faust, Grant Morrison's Zenith, Delta Green, The Omen, The Exorcist and references to the works of Clive Barker, Robert W. Chambers, Roger Corman, William Hope Hodgson, Shaun Hutson, H. P. Lovecraft, Palo Mayombe, Kim Newman, Edgar Allan Poe and Hammer studios.

== Major characters ==
=== Ethan Kostabi ===
Also known as Citizen Strange, David Smith [real name], possibly Nyarlathotep.

- 1970's rock star, turned New Media Entrepreneur / Internet Guru / Venture Capitalist
- Owner & Founder of Caballistics Inc.
- Lives in Bern, Switzerland
- Also owns Abraxas Research Facility (Wenley Moor, Yorkshire), Ludgate Studios and multiple & diverse other holdings (legal and otherwise)

=== Mr. Howard Slater ===
- Manager of Caballistics Inc. / Legal Representative of Ethan Kostabi (12 years)

=== Solomon Ravne ===
Aka: Der Teufel The Devil, Master Raven, Dominus, Ravenous

- De facto leader of the Caballistics team, due to his knowledge and magical powers.
- Over 300 years old & has no soul (his admission).
- Known to have been a denizen of Prague, 1672, he was subsequently reported living in Edinburgh, Scotland in 1737, Germany, 1945-46 (where he was SS Obergruppenführer of Sonderkommando Thule (Nazi Occult Warfare Division, Operation Doppelgänger, Peenemunde, 1945)), Bangkok, Thailand in 2003, and London, England, 2003-. Since revealed to be an homunculi originally created by Kostabi as part of the latter's efforts to cheat death.
- Hobbies: Bathing in fresh human blood; Tantric rituals with slaves Gustav and Gretchen.
- Special Kit: Hand of Power; Lamp of Alhazred; Infernal Pocket Watch; Healing & regeneration tank
- Father to a child by the possessed Jenny Simmons

=== Doctor Jonathan Brand ===
Aka Professor Brand, Brainiac

- Paranormal Historian, Q Department (sold; formerly British Government Ministry of Defence)
- Pipe smoker
- Has written a book: "History of the British Rocket Group".

=== Miss Jennifer Simmons ===
Aka Demon Jenny, Edwina Scissorhands, Baarish-Shammon, She Who Stalks By Night

- Possession: Jenny was possessed by a demon which claims that she is dead. Ravne insists that she is still alive but may be insane.
- Paranormal Historian, Q Department (sold; formerly British Government Ministry of Defence)
- Recently revealed that she is pregnant with Ravne's child
- Is now the target of several different occult factions of the British Government, who have decided that her imminent child is potentially too dangerous to let live

=== Mr Lawrence Verse ===
Aka Father Lawrence

- Originally teamed up with Hannah Chapter as freelance paranormal consultants
- Employment: Priest / Exorcist (defrocked following "chainsaw exorcism") Martinique 1995; freelance with Chapter (inc. Guatemalan Were-Jaguar Cult: 1999; Zagreb, Croatia); 2-year freelance contract with Caballistics Inc.
- Weaponry: shotgun, taser, stake / holy cross hybrid, shades

=== Miss Hannah Chapter ===
- Employment: Majored in Cryptozoology at Arkham University. American Government [specialist work: colleagues: Warren (alive), Perconte (alive), Charteris (dead), Niland (dead)], freelance with Verse (inc. Guatemalan Were-Jaguar Cult: 1999; Zagreb, Croatia); 2-year freelance contract with Caballistics Inc.
- Weaponry: Spook Detector, 2 pistols (9mm parabellum steel-jacketed / armour-piercing / hollow point Vatican silver), shades
- Favourite tipple: Double Jack Daniels & black, straight up.
- Has written (unpublished) book: Mixed-Up Flicks For Mixed-Up Chicks

=== Mr. Mikey Ness ===
Aka The Nessy Monster, Bravo Two Zero

- Employment: SAS, Gulf War, 1991; mental hospital patient (sectioned), 1991–2003; Caballistics employee, 2004–2007)
- Has murdered a British Cabinet minister and Jonathan Brand
- Heavy Glasgow accent
- Weaponry: expert in many kinds, but prefers a knife.

== Bibliography ==
=== Comics ===
All installments have been written by Gordon Rennie and drawn by Dom Reardon:

- The Complete Caballistics Inc (304 pages, Rebellion Developments, February 2019, ISBN 1781086958)
  - "Going Underground" (in 2000 AD Prog 2003, #1322-1326, 2002)
  - "Moving In" (in 2000 AD #1331-1333, 2003)
  - "Breaking Out" (in 2000 AD #1337-1340, 2003)
  - "Downtime" (in 2000 AD #1363-1368, 2003)
  - "Krystalnacht" (in 2000 AD Prog 2004, 2003)
  - "Picking Up The Pieces" (in 2000 AD #1400, 2004)
  - "Creepshow" (in 2000 AD #1401-1408, 2004)
  - "Weird War Tales" (in 2000 AD Prog 2005, 2004)
  - "Safe House" (in 2000 AD #1420-1424, 2004)
  - "Northern Dark" (in 2000 AD #1443-1448, 2005)
  - "Strange Bedfellows" (in 2000 AD Prog 2006, 2005)
  - "Changelings" (in 2000 AD #1469-1474, 2006)
  - "Ashes" (in 2000 AD #1551-1558, 2007)
  - "The Nativity" (in 2000 AD Prog 2008, 2007)
  - "Visiting Hour" (in 2000 AD Prog 2111, 2019)

=== Novels ===
So far there have been two novel adaptations:

- Caballistics, Inc.: Hell on Earth (by Mike Wild, Black Flame, August 2006, ISBN 1-84416-386-5)
- Caballistics, Inc.: Better the Devil (by Mike Wild, Black Flame, March 2007, ISBN 1-84416-432-2)
