= Class Warfare =

Book of interviews with Noam Chomsky

- Author: Noam Chomsky
- Publisher: Common Courage Press (US); Pluto Press (UK)
- Publication date: April 1996
- Media type: Print (Paperback)
- Pages: 185
- ISBN: 1-56751-092-2
- OCLC: 34115584
- Dewey Decimal: 410/.92 20
- LC Class: P85.C47 A5 1996

Class Warfare is a book of collected interviews with Noam Chomsky conducted by David Barsamian. It was first published in the United States by Common Courage Press, and in the United Kingdom by Pluto Press, in 1996.

== Publishing history ==
The book was published in clothbound (ISBN 1-56751-093-0) and paperback (ISBN 1-56751-092-2) forms in 1996.

It was republished by Oxford University Press (New Delhi) in 2005 (ISBN 0-19564-263-5).

== Influence ==
Writer Rob Williams has stated that Class War was a major inspiration for his superhero comic book series Cla$$war.

== See also ==
- Class warfare
