= Mark Harrison (comics) =

British comic book artist

- Born: 22 September 1963 (age 63)
- Areas: Penciller, Inker
- Notable works: Durham Red; Glimmer Rats

Mark Harrison (born 22 September 1963) is a British comic book artist and occasional writer. The bulk of his work has appeared in the magazine 2000 AD.

Harrison's fully painted style uses strong, dark colours and computer effects, though series like The Ten-Seconders (written by Rob Williams) have favored lighter pencilling.

== Biography ==
Harrison graduated from School of Art, Bournville in 1982.

He started work at 2000 AD in 1994 working on the Durham Red-related titles as well as Glimmer Rats and The Ten-Seconders.

Harrison has illustrated cards for the Magic: The Gathering collectible card game.

Most recently he has been creating book covers for Abaddon Books.

Harrison joined Oxford based games developer Rebellion as Head of Concept and worked on Star Wars: Battlefront (PSP), Star Wars Battlefront: Renegade Squadron, and Aliens vs. Predator (Xbox 360 and PS3).

== Bibliography ==
Comics work includes:

- Judge Dredd: "Conspiracy of Silence" (with John Wagner, in 2000 AD #891-894, 1994)
- Durham Red:
  - "Mirrors" (with Peter Hogan, in 2000 AD #901-903, 1994)
  - "Deals" (with Peter Hogan, in 2000 AD #960-963, 1995)
  - "Night of the Hunters" (with Peter Hogan, in 2000 AD #1000-1005, 1996)
  - "Epicedium" (with Dan Abnett, in 2000 AD #1006, 1996)
  - "The Scarlet Cantos" (with Dan Abnett, in 2000 AD #1078-1089, 1998 ISBN 1-904265-86-3)
  - "Mask of the Red Death" (with Dan Abnett, in 2000 AD #1111, 1998)
  - "The Vermin Stars" (with Dan Abnett, in 2000 AD #1250-1261, 2001 ISBN 1-904265-08-1)
  - "The Empty Suns Book I" (with Dan Abnett, in 2000 AD #1362-1368, 2003)
  - "The Empty Suns Book II" (with Dan Abnett, in 2000 AD #1382-1386, 2004)
- Strontium Dogs: "High Moon" (with Dan Abnett, in 2000 AD #940-947, 1995)
- Pulp Sci-Fi:
  - "Grunts" (with Dan Abnett, in 2000 AD #1096, 1998)
  - "Space Weed" (in 2000 AD #1120, 1998)
  - "Blood of Heroes" (in 2000 AD #1126, 1999)
- Glimmer Rats (with Gordon Rennie, in 2000 AD prog 2000 & #1174-1182, 1999–2000, tpb, ISBN 1-56971-698-6)
- The Scarlet Apocrypha (with Dan Abnett):
  - "Genegun SD" (in Judge Dredd Megazine #4.16, 2002)
  - "In the Flesh" (in Judge Dredd Megazine #4.18, 2002)
- The Ten-Seconders (with Rob Williams, in 2000 AD #1469-1479, 2006)
- Damnation Station (with Al Ewing, in 2000 AD #1850-1861, 2013)
- The Out (with Dan Abnett, in 2000 AD #2187-2195, 2197-2199, 2250-2255, 2257-2264; ISBN 978-1-78618-696-6)
