= Dom Reardon =

British comics artist

- Areas: Penciler, Inker
- Notable works: Caballistics, Inc.
- Awards: Best New Talent (British comics awards, 2004)

Dom Reardon is a British comics artist, whose work appears mainly in British comic 2000AD. He is the illustrator of Gordon Rennie-scripted horror tale Caballistics, Inc.

== Biography ==
Noted for a sketchy, deliberately rough black-and-white style, Reardon is often connected with fellow Brits Jock and Henry Flint. His work is clearly influenced by Mike Mignola, though other influences are said to include Kent Williams, Sean Phillips, Duncan Fegredo, Dean Ormston and Eduardo Risso.

== Bibliography ==
=== Comics ===
Comics work includes:

- Tharg's Terror Tales:
  - "In Memoriam" (with Gary Simpson, in 2000 AD #1281, 2002)
  - "Scene of the Crime" (with Al Ewing, in 2000 AD #1296, 2002)
  - "The Statue Garden" (with Gary Wilkinson, in 2000 AD #1327, 2003)
- Caballistics, Inc. (with Gordon Rennie):
  - "Going Underground" (in 2000 AD #1322-1326, 2002)
  - "Moving In" (in 2000 AD #1331-1333, 2003)
  - "Breaking Out" (in 2000 AD #1337-1340, 2003)
  - "Downtime" (in 2000 AD #1363-1368, 2003)
  - "Krystalnacht" (in 2000 AD prog 2004, 2003)
  - "Picking Up The Pieces" (in 2000 AD #1400, 2004)
  - "Creepshow" (in 2000AD, 2004)
  - "Safe House" (in 2000 AD #1401-1408, 2004)
  - "Weird War Tales" (in 2000 AD prog 2005, 2004)
  - "Northern Dark" (in 2000 AD #1443-1448, 2005)
  - "Strange Bedfellows" (in 2000 AD prog 2006, 2005)
  - "Changelings" (in 2000 AD #1469-1474, 2006)
  - "Ashes" (in 2000 AD #1551-1558, 2007)
  - "The Nativity" (in 2000 AD prog 2008, 2007)
- "Chalky" (with Edward Berridge, in Something Wicked #1, 2006)
- The Ten-Seconders (with Rob Williams, in 2000 AD #1578-1580, 2008)
- The Grievous Journey of Ichabod Azrael (with Rob Williams, in 2000 AD #1677–1688, March–June 2010)
- Raven's Gate (adapted by Tony Lee, from the novel by Anthony Horowitz, 160 page graphic novel, Walker Books, August 2010, ISBN 978-1-4063-0647-7)

=== Tabletop Games ===
- SLA Industries - Nightfall Games (1999)
- Wizards of the Coast (1999)

== Awards ==
- 2004 - won TRIPWIRE Award For Best New Talent, British comics awards
