= Class Struggle =

Class Struggle may refer to:

- Class struggle, or class conflict, political tension and economic antagonism among the social classes of a society
- Class Struggle (board game)
- The Class Struggle (Erfurt Program), an 1892 book-length work by Karl Kautsky
- The Class Struggle (magazine), an American magazine 1917–1919
- The Class Struggle, journal of the Communist League of Struggle 1931–1937
- Class Struggle, the newspaper of Spark
- Klassekampen ('The Class Struggle'), a Norwegian newspaper

== See also ==
- Class war (disambiguation)
