= Razorjack =

- The cover of Com.X's collected edition of Razorjack; Art by John Higgins
- First appearance: Razorjack (1999)
- Created by: John Higgins

Publication information
- Publisher: Jack Publishing; Com.X
- Formats: Original material for the series has been published as a strip in the comics anthology(s) Razorjack and a set of limited series.
- Genre: Science fiction
- Publication date: Jack Publishing; 1999; Com.x; 2001
- Number of issues: 3

Creative team
- Writer(s): John Higgins
- Artist(s): John Higgins
- Letterer(s): John Higgins; Eddie Deighton
- Colourist(s): John Higgins; Sam Hart; S. J. Hurst; Rodrigo Reis
- Editor(s): John Higgins; Eddie Deighton; Craig Johnson; Benjamin Shahrabani

Reprints
- Collected editions
- Limited Edition Box Set: ISBN 1-905792-04-2
- Collected Edition: ISBN 1607438178

Razorjack is an independent comic book created, written and illustrated by John Higgins, published first by Higgins' own Jack Publishing and later by Com.X.

== Publication history ==
Razorjack's first appearance was a fifteen-page strip entitled 'Citadel' that appeared in the first and only issue of Higgins' self-published anthology comic Razorjack (Jack Publishing, 1999).

Razorjack returned in a two-issue comic book limited series published by Com.X in 2001.

In May 2018, Higgins and writer Michael Carroll incorporated Razorjack into the Judge Dredd universe in Judge Dredd Megazine #396.

== Plot ==
Razorjack tells the story of three college students who inadvertently create an opening into an alternate universe - known by its inhabitants as The Twist Dimension - and consequently become a target for the evil Razorjack.

Police officers Ross and Frame investigate the results of Razorjack's killing spree and are drawn into what is potentially the ultimate battle between good and evil.

== Collected editions ==
The Razorjack: Collected Edition trade paperback (ISBN 1607438178) was published in 2009 by Com.X and contains all of the previously published material plus a new four-page short story.

Two limited-edition box-sets of Razorjack were published by Foruli (with Loco Motive Studios and Com.x) in 2009: The Signature Edition (ISBN 1905792042) contains a signed 96-page book in a slipcase (collecting the same material as the trade paperback), accompanied by a signed screenprint. Limited to 45 copies. The Deluxe Edition contains the above plus an original painting by John Higgins. Limited to 15 copies

== Reception ==
Newsarama suggested it "comes off as the Cthulhu mythos mixed with a really nasty episode of Law & Order" and that "[t]here are echoes here of Clive Barker and the aforementioned Lovecraft, but those are just part of a stream of ideas that sail along in a much different way due to the comics format," concluding that "[i]f there's a downside to the volume, it's that it's over in a seemingly short period of time."
