= Batman: Gothic =

1990 comic book storyline

"Gothic"
- Cover to trade paperback of Batman: Gothic.
- Publisher: DC Comics
- Publication date: April – August 1990
- Genre: Superhero
- Title(s): Legends of the Dark Knight #6-10
- Main character: Batman

Creative team
- Writer: Grant Morrison
- Artist: Klaus Janson
- Letterer: John Costanza
- Colorist: Steve Buccellato
- Editor: Andrew Helfer
- Gothic: ISBN 1-56389-028-3

Gothic, also known as Gothic: A Romance, is a 1990 Batman comic book storyline that ran through the Legends of the Dark Knight monthly series and was later compiled into trade paperback form. It was written by Grant Morrison and illustrated by Klaus Janson.

When the senior leaders of Gotham City's mobs find themselves hunted down by a figure from their past they turn to Batman for assistance. Initially reluctant, Batman's investigation into the identity and motives of the murderer uncovers a sordid tale from Gotham's past, a bargain reminiscent of Don Giovanni, an ancient Faustian pact, Gotham City's cathedral and a forgotten episode from Bruce Wayne's childhood.

== Plot ==
Someone is murdering Gotham's mob bosses one by one. Realizing the connection between them, and that he might be next, Boss Ottavio gathers the remaining bosses and lieutenants and summons Batman using an inverted bat-symbol. The mobsters explain to Batman that the murderer is known as "Mr. Whisper" and was a child killer who killed seven children twenty years ago. Ottavio calls Whisper the "man with no shadow" and asserts that he and his colleagues killed him, but that he wouldn't stay dead. Batman refuses to help the mobsters and leaves, but investigates the murders on his own. The mention of a shadowless man brings to mind an incident from Bruce Wayne's school days when he saw evidence that his headmaster, Mr. Winchester, not only murdered his school friend, but also cast no shadow. Batman is disturbed as he had chalked this incident up to an overactive imagination. A young woman claiming to be a nun appears at Gotham cathedral and is taken in by Whisper.

Ottavio is killed after drinking poisoned wine, and Whisper is spotted at the scene. Batman confronts him, but Whisper displays superhuman strength and tosses his enemy off the roof of a highrise. After his cape is caught on a gargoyle statue, Batman makes his way back up to the roof and again faces Whisper, who recognizes him as Bruce Wayne. Whisper then jumps off the building himself, walking away from a fall that should have been fatal. Batman decides to fly to Austria after procuring recordings of Mr. Winchester's lectures from his school and analyzing his Austrian accent, as well as accidentally hearing a recording of his father, who mentions the "Drowned Monastery" in Lake Dess. In Vienna, Batman speaks with the father of a local monastery who recounts the tale of Brother Manfred, a monk in the monastery of the Capuchins. Manfred was led astray by a novitiate named Conrad into debauchery and blasphemy. Soon, the other monks in Manfred's order followed his lead, committing terrible sins including the rape and murder of a group of nuns seeking sanctuary, with the worst of it reserved for the youngest nun. According to the story, Manfred then traded his soul to the devil for deliverance from the Black Plague and 300 years of life during which nothing could hurt or kill him. The monk's rampage was only stopped by the flooding of his monastery due to a dam break. According to legend, the spirit of the youngest nun still haunts the drowned monastery. Batman searches the remains of the drowned cathedral, witnesses a vision of the spirit of the nun and finds a blueprint of Gotham Cathedral. Batman realizes that Mr. Whisper, Mr. Winchester, and Brother Manfred are all one and the same.

Batman returns to Gotham and confronts Morganstern, the last mob boss on Whisper's list. Morganstern tells Batman about how he and the other mobsters hunted down Whisper because of the child murders, while subsequent increased police presence were making their operations difficult. When they found him, they tried to kill Whisper but found to their horror that, no matter what they did, his body repaired itself. Ultimately, they decided to chain him up and throw him into Gotham harbor. Batman agrees to be present at a meeting between Morganstern and Whisper at a local warehouse.

Batman arrives at the warehouse to find Morganstern and all his men dead and hanging from the rafters. Whisper then knocks Batman out and ties him up, constructing an elaborate Rube Goldberg/Heath Robinson-style device to kill him. Whisper tells Batman that he remembers him as a child, claiming that he would have been Whisper's next victim had his father not taken him out of school. Whisper tells his story, explaining how he gained 300 years by measuring his shadow with a length of twine, his soul becoming trapped in the twine shortly thereafter. He continues recounting how he resolved to cheat the devil from taking his soul. Using the germs from the plague victims in his monastery, Manfred developed a lethal airborne pathogen that will kill everyone in Gotham City. Manfred states that Gotham Cathedral itself is the delivery mechanism for this plague, designed to shatter the vial at midnight and then magically collect the souls of everyone killed so he can offer them up to the devil in exchange for his own. He reveals that the murders of the crime bosses were really just a means of passing the time.

Batman escapes from the trap and arrives at Gotham Cathedral a few minutes before midnight. As he fights Whisper, the floor collapses and they fall into a subway tunnel. The two continue to fight and Batman tosses Whisper into the path of an oncoming train. Batman disables the Cathedral's bell, stopping the next tolling from shattering the plague vial, and thus the plague is kept contained. Shortly after, Whisper is confronted by the young nun who reveals herself as Lucifer Morningstar, and advises Whisper that You are mine beyond reprieve. You always were. Carrying through with their pact, Lucifer finally takes Manfred to Hell. Later, Bruce Wayne receives a package with Whisper's/Manfred's heart, tied with the very same length of twine that once housed his soul. He flies back to Austria and throws the heart into the river to let the nun killed by Whisper finally rest in peace.

== Artistic background and themes ==
For Gothic, Morrison mixed elements from different media: the initial story arc shows how mobsters searched for and killed Mr. Whisper when there was pressure from the police force to find the child killer who terrorized the city. This part of the story is similar to the classic noir film M.

An ancient pact between the Monk Manfred (later known to Batman and the organized crime underworld as Mr. Whisper) and the Devil is a reminiscence of the Faustian bargain related to the German legend of Faust.

Morrison also made use of several operas; Don Giovanni, Mozart's famous opera, is mentioned as one of the key elements in Manfred's story, and probably as one of the inspirations Morrison took for Gothic: A Romance. Another important source is the Gothic novel The Monk: A Romance, by Matthew Gregory Lewis.

Mr. Whisper's true name, Manfred, is most likely a reference to the protagonist of the dramatic poem Manfred, written by Lord Byron. Throughout the poem, Manfred succeeds in challenging all authoritative powers he comes across, and refuses to submit to spirits of higher powers. At the end, Manfred dies defying religious temptations of redemption from sin.

== Critical reaction ==
IGN Comics ranked Batman: Gothic #16 on a list of the 25 greatest Batman graphic novels, saying that "Gothic offers not only a new twist to the origins of Bruce Wayne, but a dark and suspenseful tale perfectly suited for the Dark Knight".

== Collected editions ==
The storyline has been collected into a trade paperback:

- Gothic (collects Legends of the Dark Knight #6-10, DC Comics, 1998, ISBN 1-56389-028-3, 2007, ISBN 1-4012-1549-1, Titan Books, ISBN 1-84576-671-7)

== Sources ==
- Callahan, Timothy (2007) Grant Morrison: The Early Years. Masters of the Medium. Sequart Research & Literacy Organization. ISBN 978-0-615-21215-9
- Batman: Gothic at the Comic Book DB (archived from the original)
