= The Ten-Seconders =

Comic series by Rob Williams

- First appearance: 2000 AD Prog 2006 (2005)
- Created by: Rob Williams; Mark Harrison

Publication information
- Publisher: Rebellion Developments
- Schedule: Weekly
- Title(s): The American Dream; 2000 AD Prog 2006, #1469-1479; Make. Believe; 2000 AD #1578-1588; Godsend; 2000 AD #1839-1849; Harris's Quest For The Perfect Xmas Pint; 2000 AD Prog 2014
- Formats: Original material for the series has been published as a strip in the comics anthology(s) 2000 AD.
- Genre: Science fiction, superhero
- Publication date: December 2005 – December 2013

Creative team
- Writer(s): Rob Williams
- Artist(s): Mark Harrison; Dom Reardon; Shaun Thomas; Ben Oliver; Edmund Bagwell

Reprints
- Collected editions
- The Ten Seconders: ISBN 9781781080665

The Ten-Seconders is a comics story which appeared in the British anthology magazine 2000 AD, written by Rob Williams and drawn by Mark Harrison, Dom Reardon, Ben Oliver, Edmund Bagwell, Shaun Thomas and Ben Willsher.

It is about a group of survivors fighting against gods that have taken over the planet. Their life-expectancy when encountering a god is ten seconds.

== Plot ==
In a near-future setting, human society has been devastated by the Gods—beings with superpowers akin to those of archetypal comic book superheroes. These entities arrived on our planet with an offer of assistance but, upon observing our inability to self-govern, insisted that we accept them as leaders. Defiantly, humanity resisted and was subsequently overwhelmed by the Gods' extraordinary powers, resulting in few survivors. The remnants of humanity now engage in a seemingly hopeless guerrilla war against their divine oppressors. Among the survivors is a group known as The Ten Seconders, who have met a man referred to only as The Scientist. He offers to assist humanity in overcoming the Gods but appears to have a mysterious connection to their existence. Now, Jenny, a member of The Ten Seconders, is being transformed into a God by The Scientist in exchange for a strategy to defeat them...

== Characters ==
=== Human ===
- Jenny - One of the three main characters and is but only a teenage girl who has recently begun her transformation into a God.
- Malloy - The leader of The Ten Seconders and a guardian to Jenny and has sworn to protect her. When The Fathers arrive they turn him into a God saying that this is his world and he must change it to the best way he sees fit, as a God he tries to rebuild the world and bring the dead back to life, but as The Scientist explains once you're dead there's no coming back and that their just empty shells and he is in fact destroying the world. In the end Malloy cancels himself out of existence believing he can't come like the other Gods.
- Harris - A friend of Malloy and Jenny and also the toughest of them all. In the end he is the sole survivor on The Ten Seconders. The character was added to bring comedy to the strip.
- Kane - An American soldier who joins The Ten Seconders after the Gods devastate America; he is driven to the edge of insanity with guilt because he killed his wife and kids to protect them from the Gods and eventually commits suicide because of it.

=== "Gods" ===
- Hero - The psychotic leader of the Gods, and the first God to appear. He is killed near the end of the progression by Watchtower, another God. His superpowers include flying, the ability to set things on fire and a heat ray from his eyes. His character is a nod to all-purpose superheroes such as Superman (in one panel, he is shown saving a plane from crashing).
- Lord Mach - A servant to Hero with the ability to move extremely fast making him impossible to shoot. But when he attacks Jenny, The Scientist pins him down allowing Jenny to kill him.
- Watchtower - A God from New York whose superpower ability is to fly great distances, as well as the ability to "see" everything that occurs over a wide area. He is chained up by Hero in order to keep an eye on the city. Watchtower betrays Hero at the end of the first book and decapitates him with the chain and then disappears. He is later found in The Farthers Spaceship by Harris in a cell where he and many other Gods have been imprisoned by The Farthers Harris make a deal if he saves him from Arachne he'll let him go, Watchtower honors his deal and kills Arachne, then tells Harris he will take the other Gods back to their Home planets and tells Harris he can have the Spaceship if he wants, Harris says he just wants to go home, he tells Harris this is why he survived and takes him home.
- Arachne - Another psychotic "God" who was captured by the US military and abandoned. He later escapes, thanks to the Ten-Seconders. When The Farthers are destroyed he manages to escape his cell and plans to kill Harris and become the new leader, however he is killed by Watchtower.
- The Scientist - A mysterious man who seems linked to the Gods, and later revealed to be one himself. Now he is turning Jenny into a God as part of a deal with Malloy, which lets the surviving humans defeat the Gods. It is later revealed he too is a God and created most of the Gods for The Fathers, he hates them and plans to destroy The Fathers and take their powers for himself. He is defeated when Jenny sacrifices herself and destroys the power of the Gods, making The Scientist mortal, allowing Harris to kill him.
- Damage - A massive God, with a childlike mentality and intelligence, who cannot be harmed by any weapon making him impossible to kill. At one point, it is revealed that he is an aberration, a failed attempt at a God that nevertheless has the powers of one. He treats The Scientist as his father but because he is so stupid, does anything for him. The Scientist sends him on a chore to the bottom of the ocean and like Watchtower we are yet to see him again. Damage is a reference to the stereotypical "super-strong, yet unintelligent" comic book character, such as the Incredible Hulk, killed by The Scientist
- The Fathers - The creators of the Gods, who arrive on Earth after The Scientist sends them a message. He describes the Gods as teenagers who stole the family car and cause a little trouble with The Fathers as angry parents who have arrived to punish them. They are later wiped out by the Scientist with help from Jenny, who's now a "God", and Damage.

== Publication ==
- The Ten-Seconders (by Rob Williams):
  - "The American Dream" (with Mark Harrison, in 2000 AD Prog 2006 and #1469-1479, 2005-2006)
  - "Make. Believe" (with Dom Reardon (1-3) and Shaun Thomas (4-6) and Ben Oliver (7-13), in 2000 AD #1578-1588, 2008)
  - "Godsend" (with Edmund Bagwell (1-8, 11) and Ben Willsher (9-10), in 2000 AD #1839-1849)
  - "Harris's Quest For The Perfect Xmas Pint" (with Edmund Bagwell, in 2000 AD Prog 2014)
