= Com.x =

British comic book publishing company

- Industry: Publishing
- Founded: 2000
- Founder: Eddie Deighton; Russell Uttley; Neil Googe
- Headquarters: Wiltshire, United Kingdom
- Key people: Eddie Deighton; Jon Sloan
- Products: Comics
- Website: Official website

Com.x is a British comic publishing company.

== History ==
=== 2000–2002 ===
Com.x was founded in 2000 by Eddie Deighton, Russell Uttley and Neil Googe. Deighton later described how the group came together in 1999:

Neil originally came for an interview as a designer at the design agency Russell and myself ran, but as soon as we saw in his portfolio that Neil had trained as a comic artist and had worked on 2000AD, we ended up talking for about 4 hours about comics and the industry in general. By the time we finished, we felt that Neil's talent would have gone to waste if we'd taken him on as a designer, so we decided instead to propose to our client, Konami, that we should work with Neil on a graphic novel for the computer game Silent Hill. They felt it would be a cool thing to do, so Neil came on board and we began developing the project. Very quickly, we found that we all got on really well and by about the third week of working together, we felt we had a lot to contribute to the comic industry in terms of enthusiasm and creativity.

The company published a number of titles in the following couple of years like Cla$$war by Rob Williams and Trevor Hairsine, Puncture by Uttley and Ben Oliver, Razorjack by John Higgins and Bazooka Jules by Googe.

Rob Williams suggested that the relatively greater impact Com.x had on the American publishing companies was:

It was purely the American format and the attention we received from the U.S. comic press. I just think Com.X's books talked to the American publishers in their own language—they looked and read like U.S. books so, hey, it's not that big a leap for American editors to see us working in American books.

The downside of this for the company was that their artists, like Trevor Hairsine, Ben Oliver, Joshua Middleton and Neil Googe, were snapped up by Marvel and DC.

They ran into bigger problems in 2002 when their offices were burgled and it took them time to recover. Other named projects, like Battle Raven Six by Antony Johnston, were never published and the company went quiet for over a year.

=== 2003–2004 ===
The second phase of the company's activity took place in 2003 and 2004. The first three issues of Cla$$war were collected into a trade paperback in 2003 and the series was finished in 2004 with new artist Travel Foreman. However, when interviewed in 2004 Googe said he did not feel the company had fully returned:

We have had a few bits out this year, Cla$$war was finished, as was Puncture and we had the Last American graphic novel ... but as a fully functioning publisher ... well no, the simple fact is we underestimated what it would take... and enthusiasm only gets you so far. We never really had that much cash and so when the big guns came knocking for the likes of Trev and Josh, with their promise of great projects, we just couldn't compete. ... So Com.X will continue to chase the deals it's already looking at, as for the comics, I like to think of it as lying dormant until such a time as it can return properly.

Other titles that were announced as returning, but never appeared, include Bazooka Jules with new artist LeSean Thomas and Thomas' own Cannon Busters.

=== 2008–present ===
The company returned fully to comics publishing in 2008, led by Eddie Deighton and business partner Benjamin Shahrabani, with a more sustainable business model. To avoid delays in the releasing of series, Deighton said that "[o]ur publishing model, at least for the time being, is going to focus on graphic novel format, collected editions, complete story-arcs, etc."

This included the release of new original graphic novel Path by Gregory Baldwin, along with the collection of Razorjack and Cla$$war. Then they will roll out other titles, including Forty-Five written by Andi Ewington with forty-five comics artists, a softcover collection of Cla$$war and another creator-owned comic.

== Titles ==
Titles published include:

- Babble by writer Lee Robson, with art by Bryan Coyle
- Bazooka Jules by Neil Googe
- BlueSpear by writer Eddie Deighton/Andi Ewington, with art by Cosmo White
- Cla$$war by writer Rob Williams, with art by Trevor Hairsine/Travel Foreman. Coloured by Len O'Grady
- Codename: Babetool by writer Jose Luis Gaitan, with art by Walter Taborda
- Duppy'78 by writer Casey Seijas, with art by Amancay Nahuelpan. Coloured by Daniel Warner
- Forty-Five by writer Andi Ewington, with art by various artists
- The Last American by writers Alan Grant/John Wagner, with art by Mike McMahon
- Monster Myths by John Lupo Avanti
- N-jin by writer Guy Haley, with art by Dan Boultwood. Coloured by Len O'Grady
- O:R:E by writer Eddie Deighton and Jim Alexander
- Path by Gregory Baldwin
- Primal by writer Russell Uttley, with art by Joshua Middleton/Ben Oliver
- Puncture by writer Russell Uttley, with art by Ben Oliver
- Razorjack by John Higgins
- SEEDS by Ross Mackintosh
- Sky Between Branches by Joshua Middleton
