= Ben Oliver =

British comics artist

- Born: Ben Oliver; April 1972 (age 54) Buckinghamshire, Britain
- Area: Illustrator / Artist
- Notable works: Judge Dredd; Batwing; Ultimate X-Men

Ben Oliver is a British Comics Artist who has worked for 2000 AD on Judge Dredd as well as providing art for The Authority, The Losers, and Ultimate X-Men.

== Biography ==
Ben Oliver, born in Buckinghamshire in 1972 is a renowned artist. His first professional work in England came out in 2000. He started work on Judge Dredd and then illustrated the Com.x limited series Puncture written by Russell Uttley.

His first professional work in America came out in 2003 when he got work at DC Comics imprints, like Wildstorm, Vertigo and America's Best Comics. He then moved to Marvel Comics where he worked on Ultimate X-Men, a couple of Thunderbolts one-shots with Christos Gage and a Wolverine one-shot written by Simon Spurrier.

Recent projects include returning to 2000 AD to finish of the second Ten Seconders story and to illustrate another Judge Dredd story by Al Ewing. He also returned to Wildstorm to work on "A Narrow Pass!" written by Uttley, a back-up feature running through the core Wildstorm Universe titles involved with the World's End storyline.

Oliver returned to Marvel to pencil the one-shots "Ultimatum: X-Men Requiem" and "Dark Reign: The List - Hulk".

He drew The Multiversity: The Just (Dec. 2014), the third issue of Grant Morrison's The Multiversity project.

== Bibliography ==
- Judge Dredd:
  - "You're a Better Man Than I Am, Gunga Dinsdale" (with John Wagner, in 2000 AD #1210, 2000)
  - "Bring Me the Heart of P. J. Maybe" (with John Wagner, in 2000 AD #1211, 2000)
  - "Dead Ringer" (with John Wagner, in Judge Dredd Megazine, vol. 3 #68, 2000)
  - "Cockroaches" (with Al Ewing, in 2000 AD #1627, 2009)
- Puncture (with Russell Uttley, 6-limited series, Com.x, 2001–2002)
- The Authority: Human on the Inside (with John Ridley, Wildstorm, 2004, ISBN 1-4012-0069-9)
- The Losers #20-22 (pencils (20-21) and art (22), with Andy Diggle and inks by Lee Loughridge (20-21), Vertigo, March–August 2005, collected in Close Quarters, collects #20-25, 144 pages, 2006 ISBN 1-4012-0719-7)
- Tom Strong #33: "The Journey Within" (with Joe Casey, America's Best Comics, August 2005, collected in Tom Strong Book 6, hardcover, December 2006, ISBN 1-4012-1108-9)
- Vigilante (with Bruce Jones, 6-issue limited series, DC Comics, November 2005 - April 2006)
- Ultimate X-Men (with Robert Kirkman, Marvel Comics):
  - "Phoenix?" (in Ultimate X-Men #69-71, 2006, collected in Ultimate X-Men Volume 14: Phoenix?, 2006, ISBN 0-7851-2019-X)
  - "Cable" (in Ultimate X-Men #75-78, 2006–2007, collected in Ultimate X-Men Volume 16: Cable, 2007, ISBN 0-7851-2548-5)
  - "Cliffhanger" (in Ultimate X-Men #81, 2007, collected in Ultimate X-Men Volume 17: Sentinels, 2008, ISBN 0-7851-2549-3)
- Thunderbolts (with Christos Gage, Marvel Comics, collected in Thunderbolts: Secret Invasion, 168 pages, March 2009, ISBN 0-7851-2394-6):
  - "International Incident" (one-shot, February 2008)
  - "Thunderbolts: Reason in Madness" (one-shot, May 2008)
- The Ten-Seconders: "Make. Believe." (with Rob Williams, 2000 AD #1584-1588, April–June 2008)
- "Tally Ho" (with Simon Spurrier, in Wolverine: Dangerous Game, one-shot, Marvel Comics, June 2008)
- Young X-Men #6-7 (with Marc Guggenheim, Marvel Comics, November–December 2008)
- "A Narrow Pass!" (with Russell Uttley, Wildstorm, April–May 2009):
  - Wildcats #8
  - Gen^{13} #28
  - Stormwatch: P.H.D. #20
  - The Authority #8
- Alpha Flight #0.1 (pencils, with writers Greg Pak/Fred Van Lente and inks by Dan Green, Marvel Comics, July 2011)
- Batwing #1-6 (with Judd Winick, ongoing series, DC Comics, November 2011-February 2012)
- Action Comics #0 (with Grant Morrison, DC Comics, November 2012)
- Masters of the Universe: Origin of He-Man #1 (with Joshua Hale Fialkov, DC Comics, March 2013)
- Batman/Superman #1, #4 (with Greg Pak, DC Comics, August/December 2013)
- Justice League #23.2 "Lobo" (with Marguerite Bennett, DC Comics, November 2013)
- "The Multiversity" #1 "The Just" (with Grant Morrison, DC Comics, October 2014)
