= Nathan Massengill =

American comic book artist (born 1970)

- Born: Nathan A. Massengill; 1970 (age 55–56) Hickory, North Carolina, U.S.
- Area: Inker
- Notable works: Inker: Deadpool; Justice Society of America

Nathan Massengill (born 1970) is an American comic book artist, most known for his work as a brush inker. His work includes Marvel Comics' Deadpool and DC Comics' the Justice Society of America. He is best known for inking Ed McGuinness, penciler on the Deadpool series. He is also known for his inking work over pencilers Mike Wieringo (Image Comics' Tellos), Dale Eaglesham (DC Comics JSA), Steve Scott (Marvel Adventures Hulk), and Sanford Greene (Marvel Adventures Spider-Man).

== Early life ==
Nathan Massengill was born in 1970 in Hickory, North Carolina. He says, "I was always drawing. I have comic book pages with panels and superhero characters that I was working on in kindergarten." His only formal education comes from the Joe Kubert School of Cartoon and Graphic Arts, which he attended for two years ('89-90). Of the school, he says, "[It] was, and remains, a fantastic school."

== Career ==
He started his professional career in the early 1990s, producing the book "Poets Prosper" for Tome Press, an imprint of Caliber Press. Shortly thereafter, in 1992-3 came his first work for DC Comics, inking an issue of The Jaguar and penciling an issue of Wonder Woman. Also during this time, he worked for Neal Adams at Continuity as a blue-line colorist. Between 1993-4, he concentrated primarily on watercolor painting heavily influenced by the techniques and work of Burton Silverman. He contributed painted covers and a series of painted graphic novels for Raven Publications. He painted a short story in the first issue of Negative Burn, a series to which he has often contributed.

In 1993, Massengill's painted work was nominated for a Chesley Award. In 1995, he returned to inking over new penciler Ed McGuinness, working on five issues of Vampirella for Harris Publications. After leaving Harris, the pair moved to Marvel Comics. After working together on the 1996 Wolverine Annual, Ed and Nathan started work on the Deadpool ongoing series, launching the title from #1 (with writer Joe Kelly and inker Norman Lee). Massengill worked on the series until issue #13. Issue #12, penciled by Pete Woods, was nominated for a 1998 Harvey Award for Best Single Issue. After leaving Deadpool, McGuinness and Massengill worked on varying titles included Marvel's The Hulk, Cable, and Awesome Entertainment's The Fighting American. In 1998, Massengill worked on Image Comics' Tellos over the late Mike Wieringo. In 2004, Massengill reunited with penciler Pete Woods on a short run in Detective Comics. After that series arc, he continued with Detective to work on the twelve-issue arc entitled "The City of Crime" written by David Lapham. Following this, Massengill has worked with penciler Steve Scott, contributing limited-animation art to Smallville Season 6 and the DVD extras for that season. He also worked with Scott on Marvel Adventures Hulk and a promotional comics for the movie Batman: The Dark Knight. He has also worked with penciler Sanford Greene on many projects, including DC Comics' Wonder Girl mini-series. Massengill worked with penciler Dale Eaglesham on five issues of DC Comics' The Justice Society of America. This series included writing and painted art by Geoff Johns and Alex Ross, and used characters from Ross's best-selling graphic novel "Kingdom Come". The work was later collected in the trade paperback, "Justice Society, Thy Kingdom Come." Massengill then returned to Deadpool with Deadpool #900 and the Marvel Holiday Magazine (2010), in which Deadpool teams up with Santa Claus. His next Deadpool project was Deadpool Team-Up #894, featuring Franken-Castle. In 2010, Massengill contributed pencils, inks, and color to Stan Lee's The Guardian Project.

In 2013, Massengill released the first graphic novel in his creator-owned series, Viscera: Epic Frail. For this project, he is the writer, artist, and publisher. A dark feminist superheroine, Viscera is an anti-rape culture paranormal thriller. In addition to the graphic novel, Viscera is also a webcomic.

== Techniques ==
Massengill is known as a "brush" inker, a style of inking noted for the predominant use of brush rather than pen-based linework. He has written an article on the inking process which includes proposed new terminology related to the field of inking.
