= Steve Scott (comics) =

U.S. comic artist

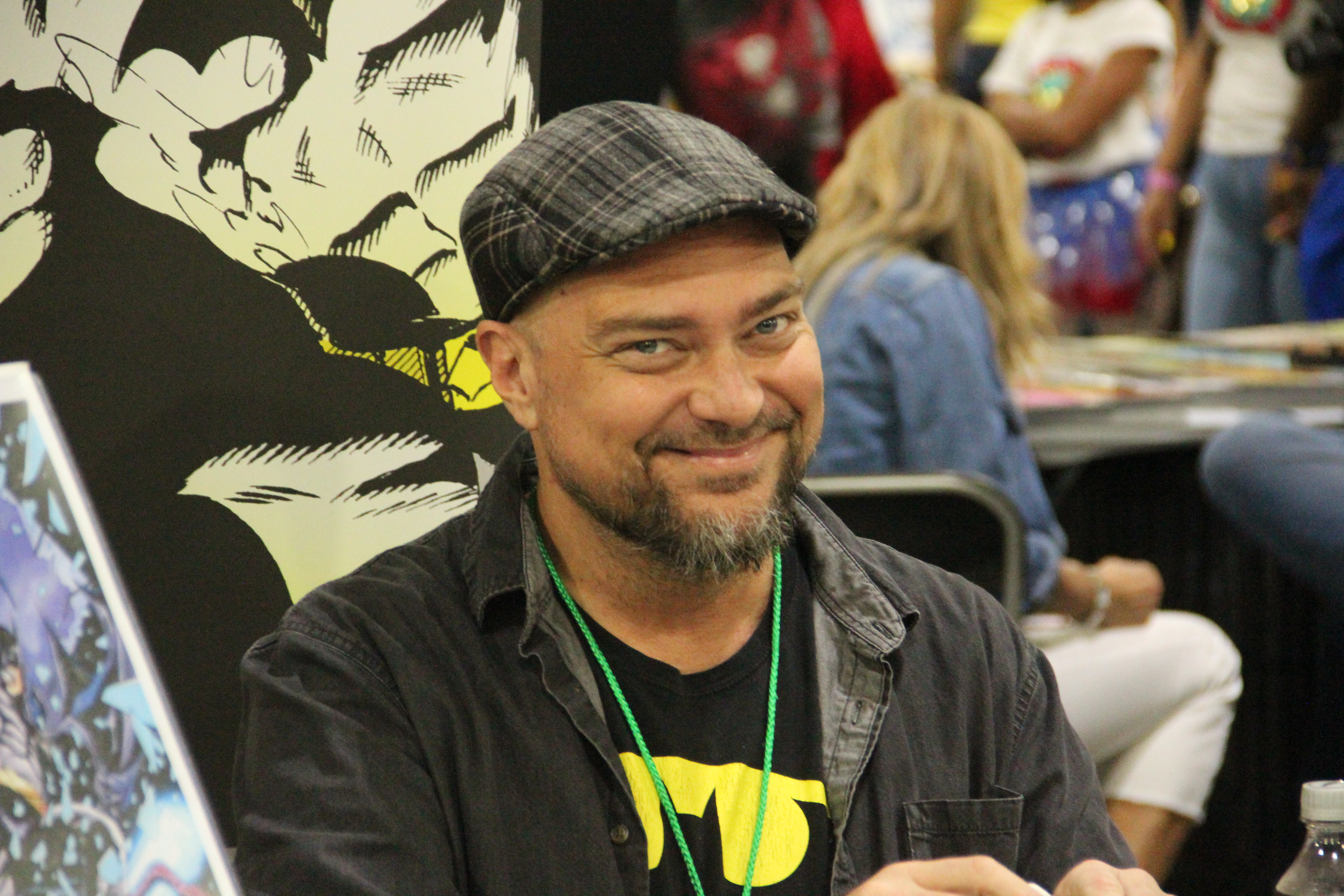
- Steve Scott at Atlanta Comic Con in 2018
- Born: Stephen B. Scott; March 19, 1968 (age 58) Gulfport, Mississippi, United States
- Areas: Cartoonist, Writer, Penciller, Artist, Inker, Colourist

Steve Scott (born March 19, 1968) is an American comic book creator. Since 1994 he has been working for a wide variety of publishers, most notably Marvel Comics and DC Comics.

== Career ==
Living in Biloxi, Mississippi, Steve Scott started sending his artwork to comic publishers in the early 1990s until the independent publisher Malibu Comics gave him his first big break as a professional comic artist in 1994 with Sludge, set in the Ultraverse. Meanwhile, he kept his daytime job as a firefighter. In 1999 he got his first of many gigs at Marvel with Wolverine and in 2000 the first of many at DC Comics with Hourman. In 2001, for DC Comics, he contributed to the publication of historical collection 9–11: The Worlds Finest Comic Book: Writers & Artists Tell Stories to Remember to commemorate public servants. His work was exhibited and archived at the Library of Congress.

In 2007 Scott drew the panels for a five episodes tie-in animated on-screen comic book for season 6 of the television series Smallville, called Smallville Legends: Justice & Doom. In 2008 George Lucas gave his personal approval for Scott to draw the comic Indiana Jones and the Tomb of the Gods. Lucas bought some of Scott's artwork for the Indiana Jones comic to exhibit them at Skywalker Ranch. That same year Scott drew a ten-page adaptation of the prologue of the Batman film The Dark Knight that was offered with the Special Blu-ray Giftset edition of Batman Begins. Film director Christopher Nolan oversaw and approved his artwork.

Around 2010 for Cognito Comics Scott made the bulk of the covers of the interactive digital graphic novel CIA: Operation Ajax that tells the story of the 1953 Iranian coup d'état. Around 2012 for Leviathan Games he provided artwork for the 3D digital comic editions of The Bane of Yoto.

In 2015 he illustrated the first two parts of Dark Fathom, the tie-in comic for the Hollywood film Independence Day: Resurgence. In 2020 Scott worked for Cutaway Comics on the one-shot comic Eldrad Must Live, a spin-off of the British sci-fi Doctor Who.

== Personal life ==
Steve Scott was captain of a team of firemen in 2005 when Biloxi was devastated by Hurricane Katrina. His own house was destroyed by a drifting riverboat casino. While on duty he met with president George W. Bush who quoted him afterwards in a CNN interview that his house and car were gone but that his family was safe and that's all that mattered.

== Bibliography ==
=== Malibu ===
- Sludge #12 (1994)
- Ultraverse Premiere #8,#10-11 (1994–1995)
- The Night Man #16 (1995)
- The Solution #16 (1995)

=== Millennium Publications ===
- Wicked #2-4 (1995)

=== Brainstorm Comics ===
- Vamperotica: Red Reign #15 (1995–1996)
- Vamperotica: Dark Fiction #2 (2001)

=== London Night Studios ===
- Razor: Uncut #20-24 (1996)
- Razor #2-3 (1997)

=== Avatar Press ===
- The Ravening #1 (1997)
- Twilight Live Wire #1 (1997)
- Pandora Pinup #1 (1997)
- Pandora: Nudes #1 (1998)
- Pandora's Chest #1 (1999)

=== Image ===
- The Tenth #1-2 (1998)

=== Marvel Comics ===
- Wolverine: Crime and Punishment #132 (1999)
- New Warriors (2nd series)
  - New Warriors #0 (1999)
  - One Good Reason #1 (1999)
  - Artificial Lives #2 (1999)
  - Loyalties #3 (1999)
- Mystic Arcana: Magik: Time Trial, Ritual of the Sphinx, Part 1 #1 (2007)
- Exiles: Where Dreams to Nightmares Grow #97 (2007)
- Marvel Adventures: The Avengers #16 (2007)
- Exiles: Starting Over #16 (2008)
- Marvel Adventures: Fantastic Four: Oh Captain, My Captain Marvel! #30 (2008)
- Marvel Adventures: Hulk
  - Analyze This #9 (2008)
  - The Unstoppable Mr. Marko #10 (2008)
  - Last Monster Standing #11 (2008)
  - HulkFu Hustle #12 (2008)
- She-Hulk
  - Heroic Proportions, Part 1 (of 2) #37 (2009)
  - Heroic Proportions, Part 2 (of 2) #38 (2009)
- X-Men Forever
  - The Fury of the Howling Commando #7 (2009)
  - ...The Harder They Fall! #8 (2009)
  - Welcome to the Jungle #9 (2009)

=== DC Comics ===
- Hourman One Million
  - Part 2: Metron's Brain #12 (2000)
  - Part 3: The Perfect Crime #13 (2000)
- JLA Annual: On Call #4 (2000)
- JLA: Tower of Babel, Conclusion: Harsh Words #46 (2000–2001)
- JLA 80-Page Giant: The Century War II #3 (2000)
- JLA Secret Files #3 (2000)
- Shadowpact
  - Blue Devil: A Night in the Life #4 (2006)
  - One Year Later #5 (2006)
  - The Pentacle Plot #1 (2007)
  - Cursed #1 (2008)
- Batman: Legends of the Dark Knight: Chicks Dig the Bat #212 (2007)
- The Creeper
  - The Island of Misfit Souls #4 (2007)
  - Welcome to Creepsville #5 (2007)
- Checkmate #11-12 (2007)
  - Corvalho, Part One #11 (2007)
  - Corvalho, Part Two #12 (2007)
- Superman's Pal, Jimmy Olsen Special
  - From A Cub To A Wolf #1 (2008)
  - The Death of Jimmy Olsen #2 (2009)
- Green Lantern - The Power of Green: Go Green, Save Some Green #1 (2010)
- Batman (1940 series)
  - Pieces, Part One: Lost #710 (2011)
  - Pieces, Part Two: The Long Way Back #711 (2011)
  - Pieces, Part Three: Gilded Lily #712 (2011)
  - In Storybook Endings #713 (2011)
- General Mills Presents: Justice League - Sinister Imitation #3 (2011)
- Batman: Eye of the Beholder (2011)
- Swamp Thing Giant #4-5 (2019)

=== ABDO Publishing ===
- The Avengers - Even A Hawkeye Can Cry #17 (2007)

=== Dark Horse ===
- Indiana Jones and the Tomb of the Gods (2008–2009)

=== Moonstone ===
- The Phantom: Ghost Who Walks
  - Godfall - Part Three #10 (2010)
  - Godfall - Part Four #11 (2010)
- Captain Action Season Two #1-2 (2010)

=== Dynamite Entertainment ===
- Kirby: Genesis - Captain Victory - Galactic Commandos! #3 (2012)
- The Shadow #100 (2015)

=== HarperCollins ===
- The Graveyard Book #1 (2014)

=== IDW Publishing ===
- Blue Nemesis (2014)
- Judge Dredd
  - The American Way of Death Part One; Slammer #17 (2014)
  - Black Light District Part 1 #22 (2014)
  - Mega-City Manhunt, Part 1: The Most Despised Face of the 22nd Century #25 (2014)
  - Mega-City Manhunt, Part 2: Thief Justice #26 (2014)
  - The American Way of Death #5 (2014)
  - Mega-City Manhunt #7 (2014)
- Rom: Earthfall #3 (2017)

=== Titan Comics ===
- Independence Day: Dark Fathom #1-2 (2016)
- Triggerman #2,#4-5 (2016–2017)
- The Assignment #1,#3 (2017)
- Peepland #3 (2017)
- Normandy Gold #1-5 (2017–2018)
- Breakneck #2 (2019)

=== Cutaway Comics ===
- Eldrad Must Live, a Doctor Who spin-off (2020)

=== Storm King Productions ===
- John Carpenter's Night Terrors: Graveyard Moon (2020)

=== Advent Comics ===
- Fist of the Dragon #1 (2022)
