= Trevor Hairsine =

British comic artist

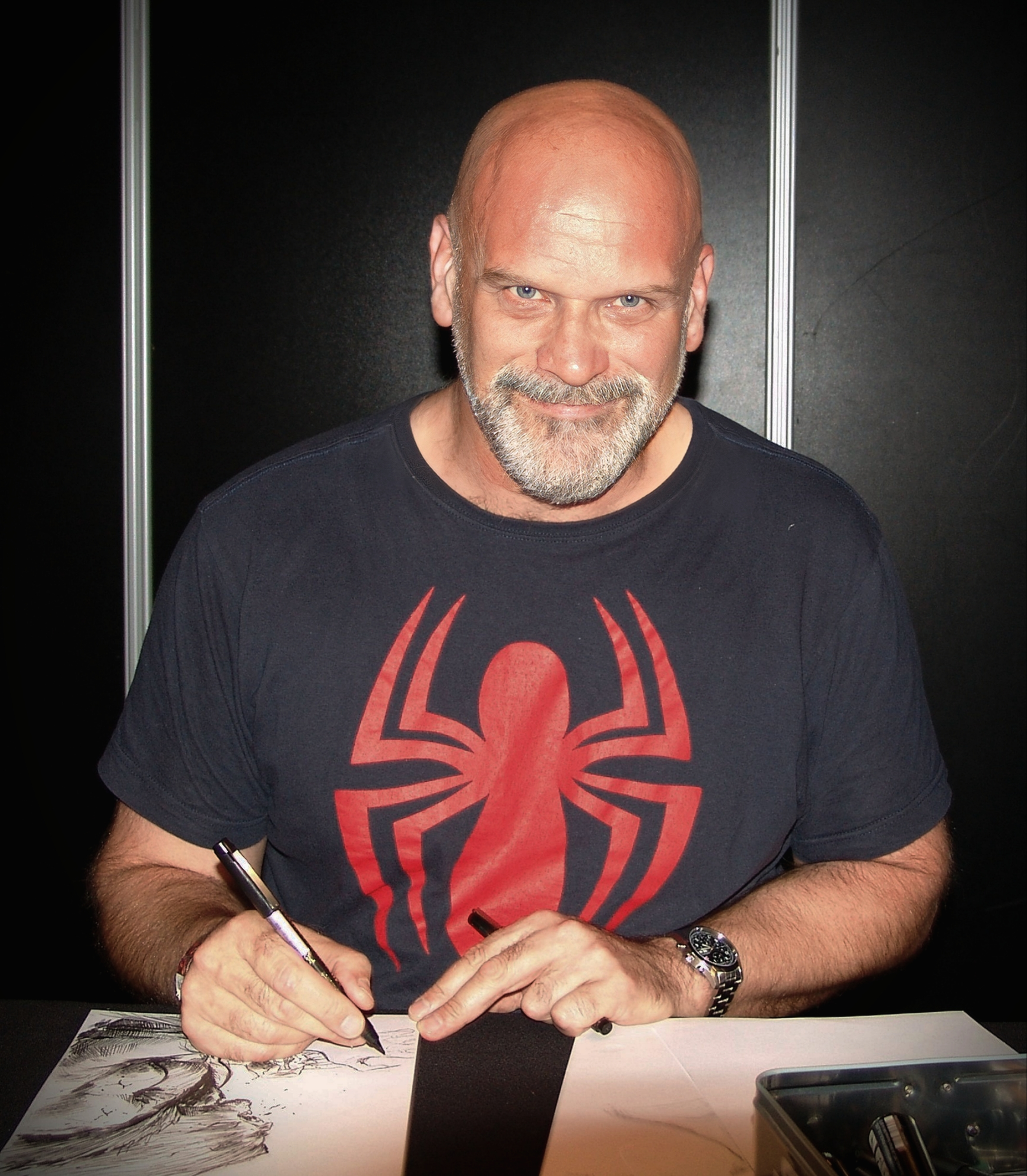
- Trevor Hairsine at the Belgian convention FACTS in 2023
- Areas: Penciler, Inker
- Notable works: Ultimate Six; Ultimate Nightmare; X-Men: Deadly Genesis; Wisdom

Trevor Hairsine is a British comics artist, whose detailed style has been compared to that of Bryan Hitch.

In August 2005 Marvel Editor-in-Chief Joe Quesada named him as one of Marvel Comics's "Young Guns", a group of artists who have the qualities that make "a future superstar penciller".

== Career ==
Hairsine began his professional career working for the Judge Dredd Megazine, where he co-created the character of Harmony Krieg, and at 2000 AD, as one of the artists of the anthology's flagship series Judge Dredd.

He worked on the first three issues of Cla$$war but problems for the publisher Com.x caused a delay in publication and Hairsine had already got the attention of Marvel Comics and went on to provide the art for Captain America. He has since worked mostly for Marvel since, frequently illustrating scripts by Brian Michael Bendis and fellow-Brit Warren Ellis.

At the New York Comic Con it was announced that he would be providing the art for Killapalooza, a new title from Wildstorm, written by Adam Beechen.

== Bibliography ==
=== Comics ===
- Harmony: "Blood and Snow" (with Chris Standley, in Judge Dredd Megazine (vol. 2) #55–60, 1994)
- Judge Dredd:
  - "Wilderlands" (with John Wagner, in Judge Dredd Megazine (vol.2) #63–67, 1994)
  - "The Three Amigos" (with John Wagner, in Judge Dredd Megazine (vol.3) #2–7, 1995)
  - "Rise & Fall of Chair Man Dilbert " (with John Wagner, in 2000 AD #1012–1013, 1996)
  - "Dredd of Drokk Green" (with Alan Barnes, in Judge Dredd Mega Special 1996)
  - "Lost in Americana" (with John Wagner, in 2000 AD #1034–1036, 1997)
  - "No More Jimmy Deans" (with John Wagner, in Judge Dredd Megazine (vol.3) No. 39, 1998)
  - "Revenge of the Taxidermist" (with John Wagner, in 2000 AD #1087–1089, 1998)
- Strontium Dogs: "Hate & War" (with Peter Hogan, in 2000 AD #993–999, 1996)
- The Johnny Unit (with John Wagner, in Judge Dredd Megazine (vol.3) No. 31, 1997)
- Missionary Man (with Gordon Rennie):
  - "Storm Warnings" (in Judge Dredd Megazine (vol.3) No. 38, 1998)
  - "The Promised Land" (in 2000 AD #1177, 2000)
- Judge Anderson: "Lawless" (with Alan Grant, in 2000 AD #1102–1103, 1998)
- Mercy Heights: "Mercy Heights Book 2" (with John Tomlinson, in 2000AD #1133–1137 & 1139–1148, 1999)
- Downlode Tales: "Lone Shark" (with Dan Abnett, in 2000 AD #1144, 1999)
- Pulp Sci-Fi: "Surgical Strike" (with Gordon Rennie, in 2000 AD #1148, 1999)
- Cla$$war #1–3 (with Rob Williams, 6-issue limited series, Com.x, January–July 2002, tpb, 2003, collects Cla$$war #1–3, hardcover, 210 pages, 2009, ISBN 1-60743-816-X)
- Captain America: The Extremists (penciller, with John Ney Rieber, Marvel, 2002–2003, tpb collects Captain America #7–11, 120 pages, 2003 ISBN 0-7851-1102-6)
- Ultimate Six (penciller, with Brian Michael Bendis, 7-issue limited series, Ultimate Marvel, 2004, tpb, Ultimate Spider-Man, Volume 9: Ultimate Six, 208 pages, June 2004, ISBN 0-7851-1312-6))
- Ultimate Galactus: Ultimate Nightmare (penciller, with Warren Ellis, Marvel, 2005)
- X-Men: Deadly Genesis (penciller, with Ed Brubaker, Marvel, 2005)
- Young Guns Sketchbook 2004 (penciller, Marvel, 2005)
- Black Panther vol. 4 No. 7 (penciller, with Reginald Hudlin, Marvel, 2006)
- Wisdom (penciller, with Paul Cornell, 6-issue limited series, MAX, 2006, tpb, 144 pages, August 2007, ISBN 0-7851-2123-4)
- X-Men Origins: Colossus #1 (penciller, with Chris Yost, one-shot, Marvel, 2008)
- "Sentry" (penciller, with Fred Van Lente, in Origins of Marvel Comics, one-shot, Marvel, July 2010)
- "Armor Hunters: Bloodshot" (penciller, with Joe Harris, 3-issue mini-series, Valiant Entertainment, 2014)
- "Divinity" (penciller, with Matt Kindt, 4-issue mini-series, Valiant Entertainment, 2015)
- "Divinity II" (penciller, with Matt Kindt, 4-issue mini-series, Valiant Entertainment, 2016)

=== Games ===
- Dredd: The Card Game (Round Table Productions, 1999)
- Rookie's Guide to the Justice Department (Mongoose, 2002)
- Dungeons & Dragons Miniatures Handbook (Wizards of the Coast, 2003)
- Magic: The Gathering:
  - Onslaught (Wizards of the Coast, 2002)
  - Mirrodin (Wizards of the Coast, 2003)
  - Darksteel (Wizards of the Coast, 2004)
  - Unhinged (Wizards of the Coast, 2004)
  - Future Sight (Wizards of the Coast, 2007)
  - Shadowmoor (Wizards of the Coast, 2008)
  - Eventide (Wizards of the Coast, 2008)
  - Shards of Alara (Wizards of the Coast, 2008)
