= 2000 AD: The Ultimate Collection =

Collection of books published by Hachette Partworks

2000 AD The Ultimate Collection
- Editor: Matt Smith, 2000 AD
- Categories: Science fiction
- Frequency: Fortnightly
- Format: Hardback book format 25 cm (h) × 19.3 cm (w)
- Publisher: Rebellion Publishing
- First issue: 2017
- Final issue Number: 2025; 200
- Company: Hachette Partworks Ltd
- Country: United Kingdom
- Language: English
- Website: Official Website
- ISSN: 2399-777X

2000 AD The Ultimate Collection is a British fortnightly partwork collection of hardback books published by Hachette Partworks. The series is made up of 200 volumes featuring comic stories from the magazine 2000 AD. The spine art on the books combine to display a new image by artist Boo Cook.

The series is the second collaboration between Hachette Partworks and 2000 AD publisher Rebellion Developments, following the success of Judge Dredd: The Mega Collection. It is available in the UK, Ireland and Australia.

== List of books ==
"Issue" refers to the order of publication, and "Volume" refers to the order in which the books are intended to be kept once the 200-volume collection is complete.

Each story was released in reading order, though not one volume directly after another, as is common with partwork collections.

Issue	Volume	Title	Collecting	UK Release Date (Note: This is the official in-shops release date; the date the issue was received by subscribers could be different. Subscribers also received 2 issues at a time.)
01 (Note: Subscribers received a reprinted copy of this issue in April 2019, with the spine image correctly printed to ensure that it correctly aligned with the rest of the spine image.)	32	Sláine: The Horned God	Sláine: The Horned God: Volume One (2000 AD Progs 626–635) The Horned God: Volume Two (2000 AD Progs 650–656, 662–664) The Horned God: Volume Three (2000 AD Progs 688–698)	23 August 2017
02	46	The Ballad of Halo Jones	The Ballad of Halo Jones: Book One (2000 AD Progs 376–385) Book Two (2000 AD Progs 405–415) Book Three (2000 AD Progs 451–466)	13 September 2017 (Note: Although the partwork was announced as fortnightly, issue one was allowed to stay on the stands for three weeks, pushing back the release of subsequent issues and syncing its appearance on the newsagent shelves with The Mega Collection)
03	57	Shakara: The Avenger	Shakara: Book One (2000 AD Progs 2002, (Note: Prog 2002 was the prog between 1272 and 1273, as the 2002 annual issue) 1273–1279) Book Two - The Assassin (2000 AD Progs 1441–1449) Book Three - The Defiant (2000 AD Progs 2008, (Note: Prog 2008 was the prog between 1566 and 1567, as the 2008 annual issue) 1567–1573) Future Shocks: Multiplicity (Judge Dredd Megazine 339)	27 September 2017
04	11	Strontium Dog: The Kreeler Conspiracy	Strontium Dog: The Kreeler Conspiracy (2000 AD Progs 2000, (Note: Prog 2000 was the prog between 1173 and 1174, as the 2000 annual issue) 1174–1180, 1195–1199) Blood Moon (2000 AD Progs 2009, (Note: Prog 2009 was the prog between 1616 and 1617, as the 2009 annual issue) 1617–1628) The Headly Foot Job (2000 AD Progs 1400–1403)	11 October 2017
05	19	Nemesis the Warlock: Volume One	Comic Rock: Terror Tube (2000 AD Prog 167) Killer Watt (2000 AD Progs 178–179) Nemesis The Warlock: Book One - The World of Termight (2000 AD Progs 222–233, 238–240, 243–244) Book Two - The Alien Alliance (2000 AD Progs 246–257) Book Three - The World of Nemesis (2000 AD Progs 335–349) The Sword Sinister (2000 AD Sci-Fi Special 1981) The Secret Life of the Blitzspear (2000 AD Annual 1983)	25 October 2017
06	60	Kingdom: Volume One	Kingdom: Kingdom (2000 AD Progs 2007, (Note: Prog 2007 was the prog between 1517 and 1518, as the 2007 annual issue) 1518–1525) The Promised Land (2000 AD Progs 2008, 1567–1576) Call of the Wild (2000 AD Progs 1650–1661)	8 November 2017
07	04	Strontium Dog: Volume One	Strontium Dog: The Galaxy Killers (2000 AD Progs 86–94) Journey into Hell (2000 AD Progs 104–118) Death's Head (2000 AD Progs 178–181) The Schicklegruber Grab (2000 AD Progs 182–188) Mutie's Luck (2000 AD Prog 189) The Doc Quince Case (2000 AD Progs 190–193)	22 November 2017
08	72	Nikolai Dante: Volume One	Nikolai Dante: The Adventures of Nikolai Dante (2000 AD Progs 1035–1041) The Romanov Dynasty (2000 AD Progs 1042–1049) Russia's Greatest Love Machine (2000 AD Prog 1066) The Gentleman Thief (2000 AD Prog 1067–1070) The Full Dante (2000 AD Prog 1071) Moscow Duelists (2000 AD Progs 1072–1075) The Gulag Apocalyptic (2000 AD Progs 1079–1082) The Trouble with Arbatovs (2000 AD Prog 1083) Cruel Britannia (2000 AD Prog 1084)	6 December 2017
09	20	Nemesis The Warlock: Volume Two	Nemesis The Warlock: Book Four: The Gothic Empire (2000 AD Progs 387–406) Ego Trip (2000 AD Prog 430) Book Five: The Vengeance of Thoth (2000 AD Progs 435–445) Book Six: Torquemurder (2000 AD Progs 482-487 & 500–504)	20 December 2017
10	02	Judge Dredd: Return of the King	Judge Dredd: Fungus (2000 AD Progs 275–277) The Prankster (2000 AD Prog 308) The Starborn Thing (2000 AD Progs 309–314) Condo (2000 AD Progs 319–321) Kirby's Demon (2000 AD Prog 638) The Amazing Ant-Man (2000 AD Prog 640) Young Giant (2000 AD Progs 651–655) Return of the King (2000 AD Progs 733–735) Christmas With Attitude (2000 AD Prog 815) The Time Machine (2000 AD Progs 889–890) Behold the Beast (Judge Dredd Annual 1983) Beat the Devil (Judge Dredd Annual 1984)	3 January 2018
11	14	Robo-Hunter: Volume One	Robo-Hunter: Verdus (2000 AD Progs 76-84 and 100–112) The Day of the Droids (2000 AD Progs 152–174).	17 January 2018
12	73	Nikolai Dante: Volume Two	Nikolai Dante: The Great Game (2000 AD Progs 1101–1110) The Octobriana Seduction (2000 AD Progs 1113–1116) The Masque of Dante (2000 AD Progs 1125–1127) The Moveable Feast (2000 AD Progs 1128–1130) Tour of Duty (2000 AD Progs 1131–1133) The Cadre Infernale (2000 AD Progs 1134–1137) The Hunting Party (2000 AD Progs 1139–1140) Fists of Fury (2000 AD Prog 1141) Last Dance on the Trans-Siberian Express (2000 AD Progs 1142–1143) Cruel Seas (2000 AD Progs 1148–1149) Requiem for Lost Love (2000 AD Prog 1150)	31 January 2018
13	23	ABC Warriors: Volume One	A.B.C. Warriors: Prologue: The A.B.C. Warriors (A.B.C Warriors Book One/2000 AD Prog 119) The Retreat from Volgow Mongrol (2000 AD Progs 121–122) The Order of Knights Martial (2000 AD Progs 123–124) The Bougainville Massacre (2000 AD Progs 125–126) Steelhorn (2000 AD Progs 127–128) Mars, The Devil Planet (2000 AD Prog 129) Cyboons (2000 AD Progs 130–131) The Red Death (2000 AD Progs 132–133) Golgotha (2000 AD Progs 134–136) Mad George (2000 AD Progs 137–139) Epilogue (A.B.C. Warriors: Book Two) The Black Hole: Part One (2000 AD Progs 555–566)	14 February 2018
14	47	Rogue Trooper: Volume One	Rogue Trooper: Rogue Trooper (2000 AD Prog 228) Nu Paree (2000 AD Prog 229) Glass Zone (2000 AD Prog 230) Clash in Doomsday Valley (2000 AD Prog 231) Terror of the Decapitators (2000 AD Prog 232) Raiders (2000 AD Prog 234) Scum Sea (2000 AD Prog 235) Ascent To Buzzard-Three (2000 AD Progs 236–238) The Rookies (2000 AD Progs 239–240) Blue Moon (2000 AD Prog 241) Poison (2000 AD Progs 242–243) Fear of the Machine (2000 AD Progs 246–248) The Dreamweavers (2000 AD Progs 249–250) The Buzzard (2000 AD Progs 251–253) The Petrified Forest (2000 AD Progs 254–257) War of Nerves (2000 AD Prog 258) Bagman Blues (2000 AD Progs 260–262) The Body Looters (2000 AD Prog 265) All Hell on the Dix-I Front (2000 AD Progs 266–277) Assassination Run (2000 AD Progs 278–279)	28 February 2018
15	12	Strontium Dog: Traitor To His Kind	Strontium Dog: The Sad Case (2000 AD Prog 2001 (Note: Prog 2001 was the prog between 1222 and 1223, as the 2001 annual issue) Traitor to His Kind (2000 AD Progs 1406–1415) Shaggy Dog Story (2000 AD Progs 2006, (Note: Prog 2006 was the prog between 1468 and 1469, as the 2006 annual issue) 1469–1472 The Glum Affair (Progs 2008, 1567–1576 The Mork Whisperer (Progs 1651–1660)	14 March 2018
16	21	Nemesis The Warlock: Volume Three	Nemesis the Warlock: Torquemada the God (2000 AD Progs 520–524) A Bedtime Story (2000 AD Prog 534) Book Seven: The Two Torquemadas (2000 AD Progs 546–557) Book Eight: Purity's Story (2000 AD Progs 558–566) Book Nine: Deathbringer (2000 AD Progs 586–608) The Shape of Things to Come (2000 AD Prog 824) Bride of the Warlock (2000 AD Winter Special 1992)	28 March 2018
17	55	Zombo	Zombo: Zombo (2000 AD Progs 1632–1639) Merry Christmas, Mr Zombo (2000 AD Prog 2010 (Note: Prog 2010 was the prog between 1665 and 1666, as the 2010 annual issue)) Zombo's Eleven (2000 AD Progs 1675–1684) The Day The Zombo Died (2000 AD Progs 1740–1749) Planet Zombo (2000 AD Progs 1825–1834)	11 April 2018
18	29	Sláine: Volume One	Sláine: The Time Monster (2000 AD Prog 330) The Beast In The Broch (2000 AD Progs 331–334) Warrior's Dawn (2000 AD Prog 335) The Beltain Giant (2000 AD Prog 336) The Bride of Crom (2000 AD Progs 337–342) The Creeping Death (2000 AD Prog 343) The Bull Dance (2000 AD Prog 344) Heroes' Blood (2000 AD Progs 345–347) The Shoggy Beast (2000 AD Progs 348–351) Sky Chariots (2000 AD Progs 352–360)	25 April 2018
19	74	Nikolai Dante: Volume Three	Nikolai Dante: The Courtship of Jenna Makarov (2000 AD Progs 1161–1172) Love And War (2000 AD Prog 2000) The Rudinshtein Irregulars (2000 AD Progs 1183–1190) Love And War (Note: Has the same title as the earlier story from Prog "2000". According to the book's In Detail section, "Morrison has no idea what happened there, and blames it on forgetfulness on the part of writer and editor") (2000 AD Progs 1200–1207) Battleship Potemkin (2000 AD Progs 1213–1220) One Last Night in the House of Sin (2000 AD Prog 2001)	9 May 2018
20	05	Strontium Dog: Volume Two	Strontium Dog: The Bad Boys Bust (2000 AD Progs 194–197) Portrait of a Mutant (2000 AD Progs 200–206, 210–221) The Gronk Affair (2000 AD Progs 224–227) The Kid Knee Caper (2000 AD Progs 228–233) The Moses Incident (2000 AD Progs 335–345)	23 May 2018
21	17	Ace Trucking Co.: Volume One	Ace Trucking Co.: Ace Trucking Co. (also known as "The Kleggs"; 2000 AD Progs 232–236) Lugjack (2000 AD Progs 244–250) (Note: Note that the second Ace Trucking Co. story '"Hell's Pocket" (2000 AD Progs 239-243) is not included in this collection.) The Great Mush Run (2000 AD Progs 251–258) The Ughbug Bloos (2000 AD Prog 259) Last Lug to Abbo Dabbo (2000 AD Progs 260–267) Joobaloo! (2000 AD Progs 268–272) Too Many Bams (2000 AD Progs 273–278)	6 June 2018
22	01	Judge Dredd: The Art of Kenny Who	Judge Dredd: The Art of Kenny Who? (2000 AD Progs 477–479) Beyond Our Kenny (Judge Dredd Megazine 1.01-1.03) Who? Dares Wins (Judge Dredd Megazine 228–229) I, Beast (2000 AD Sci-Fi Special 1985) Auld Acquaintance (2000 AD Yearbook 1992) Bodies of Evidence (2000 AD Progs 1234–1236) Big Deal At Drekk City (2000 AD Progs 1400–1404) Blackout (Judge Dredd Megazine 238–239) The Suspect (2000 AD Prog 342) The Warlord (2000 AD Progs 451–455)	20 June 2018
23	48	Rogue Trooper: Volume Two	Rogue Trooper: Hats off to Helm (2000 AD Progs 280–281) The Marauders (2000 AD Progs 282–289) Fort Neuro (2000 AD Progs 290–301, 303–310) Major Magnam (2000 AD Progs 311–315) Bigfoot (2000 AD Prog 316) Bio-Wire (2000 AD Prog 317) Mill-Com Memories (2000 AD Progs 318–322) The Vid-Vultures (2000 AD Progs 323–326)	4 July 2018
24	24	ABC Warriors: Volume Two	A.B.C. Warriors: The Black Hole: Part Two (2000 AD Progs 573–581) Khronicles of Khaos: Book One (2000 AD Progs 750–757) Khronicles of Khaos: Book Two (2000 AD Progs 780–784, 787-790) Hellbringer: Book One (2000 AD Progs 904–911)	18 July 2018
25	43	Meltdown Man	Meltdown Man: Meltdown Man (2000 AD Progs 178–227)	1 August 2018
26	30	Sláine: Volume Two	Sláine: Dragonheist (2000 AD Progs 361–367) Time Killer (2000 AD Progs 411–428, 431–434) The Battle of Clontarf (2000 AD Annual 1985)	15 August 2018
27	67	Sinister Dexter: Volume One	Sinister Dexter: Max Vactor (2000 AD Prog 984) The Eleventh Commandment (2000 AD Progs 988–989) Wish Upon A Czar (2000 AD Progs 992–993) Gunshark Vacation (2000 AD Progs 1024–1031) Murder 101 (2000 AD Progs 1051–1061) London Town (2000 AD Prog 1084) The Big Stiff (2000 AD Prog 1085) Lyrical Bollards (2000 AD Prog 1086) Drop Dead Gorgeous (2000 AD Progs 1090–1091)	29 August 2018
28	06	Strontium Dog: Volume Three	Strontium Dog: The Killing (2000 AD Progs 350–359) Outlaw! (2000 AD Progs 363–385) Big Bust of '49 (2000 AD Progs 416–424)	12 September 2018
29	45	D.R. & Quinch / Skizz	Time Twisters: D.R. and Quinch Have Fun On Earth (2000 AD Prog 317) D.R. & Quinch: D.R. and Quinch Go Straight (2000 AD Progs 350–351) D.R. and Quinch Go Girl Crazy (2000 AD Progs 352–354) D.R. and Quinch Get Drafted (2000 AD Progs 355–359) D.R. and Quinch Go-Hollywood (2000 AD Progs 363–367) D.R. and Quinch Get Back-Nature (2000 AD Sci-Fi Special 1985) D.R. & Quinch's Incredibly Excruciating Agony Page (2000 AD Progs 525–530, 532–534) Skizz: Skizz (2000 AD Progs 308–330)	26 September 2018
30	15	Robo-Hunter: Volume Two	Robo-Hunter: The Beast of Blackheart Manor (2000 AD Progs 259–265) The Filby Case (2000 AD Progs 266–272) Killing of Kidd (2000 AD Progs 275–281) Football Crazy (2000 AD Progs 283–288) Play it again, Sam (2000 AD Progs 292–307)	10 October 2018
31	61	Kingdom: Volume Two	Kingdom: His Master's Voice (2000 AD Progs 2011, (Note: Prog 2011 was the prog between 1714 and 1715, as the 2011 annual issue) 1715–1725) Aux Drift (2000 AD Progs 1900–1909) Beast of Eden (2000 AD Progs 1961–1972)	24 October 2018
32	31	Sláine: Volume Three	Sláine: Tomb of Terror (2000 AD Progs 447–461) The Spoils of Annwn (2000 AD Progs 493–499) Sláine the King (2000 AD Progs 500-508 & 517–519) The Killing Field (2000 AD Prog 582) Mini-Series (also known as Sláine The King) (2000 AD Progs 589–591)	7 November 2018
33	52	Bad Company: Volume One	Bad Company: Bad Company (2000 AD Progs 500–519) The Bewilderness (2000 AD Progs 548–557)	21 November 2018
34	07	Strontium Dog: Volume Four	Strontium Dog: The Slavers of Drule (2000 AD Progs 425–434) The Ragnarok Job (AKA Max Bubba) (2000 AD Progs 445–465) Rage (Part One) (2000 AD Progs 466-467 AKA Smiley's World & 469-480 (styled as Strontium ~~Dog~~ Rage))	5 December 2018
35	75	Nikolai Dante: Volume Four	Nikolai Dante: The Beguiling (2000 AD Progs 1234–1235) Fiends (2000 AD Progs 1236–1239) The Romanov Empire (2000 AD Progs 1250–1262) Return of the Gentleman Thief (2000 AD Progs 2002, 1273–1274) The Romanov Job (2000 AD Progs 1280–1287)	19 December 2018
36	18	Ace Trucking Co.: Volume Two	Ace Trucking Co.: The Kloistar Run (2000 AD Progs 279–285) Stoop Coop Soup (2000 AD Progs 288–293 On the Dangle (2000 AD Progs 378–386) Strike! (2000 AD Progs 387–390, 392–400) The Croakside Trip (2000 AD Progs 428–433)	2 January 2019
37	25	ABC Warriors: Volume Three	ABC Warriors: Hellbringer Book Two (2000 AD Progs 964–971) Roadkill (2000 AD Prog 2000) The Third Element (2000 AD Progs 1234–1236) The Clone Cowboys (2000 AD Progs 1237–1239) The Tripods (2000 AD Progs 1240–1242) The Zero Option (2000 AD Progs 1243–1245) Assault on the Red House (2000 AD Progs 1246–1248) The Shadow Warriors (2000 AD Progs 1336–1341)	16 January 2019
38	42	Aquila	Aquila: Prologue (2000 AD Prog 2012 (Note: Prog 2012 was the prog between 1763 and 1764, as the 2012 annual issue)) Blood of the Iceni (2000 AD Prog 1792–1799) Quo Vadis, Domine? (2000 AD Prog 2013 (Note: Prog 2013 was the prog between 1812 and 1813, as the 2013 annual issue)) Where All Roads Lead (2000 AD Prog 1851–1855) Carnifex (2000 AD Prog 1890–1899) Charon's Mercy (2000 AD Prog 1973–1978) Mors Venetiae (2000 AD Prog 2011 (Note: This is the weekly Prog 2011 in the regular numbering scheme, published in December 2016, not the annual Prog 2011 published in December 2010))	30 January 2019
39	16	Robo-Hunter: Volume Three	Robo-Hunter: The Slaying of Slade (2000 AD Progs 312–330) Sam Slade's Last Case (2000 AD Progs 331–334) Farewell, My Billions (2000 AD Progs 435–443) Hoagy's First Case (2000 AD Annual 1984)	13 February 2019
40	33	Sláine: Volume Four	Sláine: The High King (2000 AD Yearbook 1992) The Jealousy of Niamh (2000 AD Progs 850–851) Demon Killer (2000 AD Progs 852–859) Queen Of Witches (2000 AD Progs 889–896) The Return of the High King (2000 AD Poster Prog Sláine 1) The Name of the Sword (2000 AD Progs 950–956) Lord of Misrule (2000 AD Progs 958-963 & 995–998)	27 February 2019
41	58	Shakara: Volume Two	Shakara: Book Four: Destroyer (2000 AD Progs 1650–1661) Book Five: Avenger (2000 AD Progs 2011, 1715–1727) Pulp Sci-Fi: The Iydian Factor (2000 AD Prog 1125) War of Words (2000 AD Prog 1159) Psico (2000 AD Prog 1160)	13 March 2019
42	22	Nemesis The Warlock: Volume Four	Nemesis the Warlock: Hammer of Warlocks (2000 AD Progs 901–903) Book X: The Final Conflict (2000 AD Progs 1165-1173 & 2000) Tubular Hells (2000 AD Prog 2000) Warlocks & Wizards (2000 AD Prog 700) The Enigmass Variations (2000 AD Progs 723–729) Deadlock (2000 AD Progs 1212–1222) A Day in the Death of Torquemada (2000 AD Annual 1984) The Tomb of Torquemada (2000 AD Poster Prog Nemesis 1) Torquemada's Second Honeymoon (2000 AD Annual 1988) Forbidden Planet (2000 AD Sci-Fi Special 1987; Photo story)	27 March 2019
43	08	Strontium Dog: Volume Five	Strontium Dog: Rage (Part Two) (2000 AD Progs 481–489) Incident on Magyer Minor (2000 AD Progs 490–496) Warzone! (2000 AD Progs 497–499) Bitch (2000 AD Progs 505–529)	10 April 2019
44	68	Sinister Dexter: Volume Two	Sinister Dexter: Mother Lode and the Red Admiral (2000 AD Progs 1092–1095) Anatomy of a Throwdown (2000 AD Prog 1112) Eurocrash (2000 AD Progs 1127–1139) Downlode Tales: Lone Shark (2000 AD Prog 1144) The Ass-Kickers (2000 AD Progs 1145–1148) The Whack Pack (2000 AD Progs 1152–1154) City On Fire (2000 AD Progs 1155–1160)	24 April 2019
45	49	Rogue Trooper: Volume Three	Rogue Trooper: Eye of the Traitor (2000 AD Progs 327–332) The 'Frisco Phog (2000 AD Progs 333–334) From Hell to Eternity (2000 AD Progs 335–340) Mega Minefield (2000 AD Progs 341–342) The Gasbah (2000 AD Progs 343–347) Timeslip (2000 AD Progs 348–349) Colonel Kovert (2000 AD Progs 350–355) You Only Die Twice (2000 AD Progs 358-364 & 366–368) Message from Milli-Com (2000 AD Progs 369–377)	8 May 2019
46	65	Stickleback	Stickleback: Mother London (2000 AD Progs 2007, 1518–1525) England's Glory (2000 AD Progs 2008, 1567–1577) London's Burning (2000 AD Progs 2010, 1666–1676) 'Twas The Fight Before Christmas (2000 AD Prog 2009)	22 May 2019
47	26	ABC Warriors: Volume Four	ABC Warriors: The Shadow Warriors: Book Two (2000 AD Progs 1400–1405) The Shadow Warriors: Book Three (2000 AD Progs 1476–1485) Red Planet Blues (2000 AD Annual 1985) Blackblood: Dishonourable Discharge (2000 AD Winter Special 1992) Joe Pineapples: His Greatest Hits (2000 AD Sci-Fi Special 1996) Ro-busters: Hammerstein's War Memoirs (2000 AD Progs 88–92) Ro-Jaws' Memoirs (2000 AD Progs 93–97) Old Red Eyes is Back (2000 AD Annual 1983)	5 June 2019
48	44	Alan Moore's Future Shocks	Tharg's Future Shocks: Grawks Bearing Gifts (2000 AD Prog 203) The English/Phlondrutian Phrasebook (2000 AD Prog 214) The Last Rumble of the Platinum Horde! (2000 AD Prog 217) They Sweep the Spaceways (2000 AD Prog 219) The Regrettable Ruse of Rocket Redglare! (2000 AD Prog 234) A Cautionary Fable (2000 AD Prog 240) Mister, Could You Use a Squonge? (2000 AD Prog 242) A Second Chance! (2000 AD Prog 245) Twist Ending (2000 AD Prog 246) Salad Days! (2000 AD Prog 247) The Beastly Benefits of Benjamin Blint (2000 AD Prog 249) All of Them Were Empty (2000 AD Prog 251) An American Werewolf in Space! (2000 AD Prog 252) The Bounty Hunters! (2000 AD Prog 253) The Wages of Sin! (2000 AD Prog 257) Return of the Thing! (2000 AD Prog 265) Skirmish! (2000 AD Prog 267) The Writing on the Wall! (2000 AD Prog 268) The Wild Frontier! (2000 AD Prog 269) The Big Day (2000 AD Prog 270) One Christmas During Eternity! (2000 AD Prog 271) No Picnic! (2000 AD Prog 272) The Disturbed Digestion of Doctor Dibworthy (2000 AD Prog 273) Sunburn (2000 AD Prog 282) Bad Timing (2000 AD Prog 291) Eureka! (2000 AD Prog 325) Dad (2000 AD Prog 329) Buzz Off! (2000 AD Prog 331) Look Before you Leap! (2000 AD Prog 332 ) Time Twisters: The Reversible Man (2000 AD Prog 308) Einstein Theory (2000 AD Prog 309) Chrono-Cops (2000 AD Prog 310) The Big Clock! (2000 AD Prog 315) Going Native (2000 AD Prog 318) Ring Road (2000 AD Prog 320) The Time Machine (2000 AD Prog 324) The Startling Success of Sideways Scuttleton (2000 AD Prog 327) One-Offs: Hot Item (2000 AD Prog 278) Dr. Dibworthy's Disappointing Day (2000 AD Prog 316) The Hyper-Historic Headbang! (2000 AD Prog 322) The Lethal Laziness Of Lobelia Loam (2000 AD Prog 323) Abelard Snazz: Final Solution (2000 AD Progs 189–190) The Return of the Two-Storey Brain! (2000 AD Prog 209) The Double Decker-Dome Strikes Back (2000 AD Progs 237–238) Halfway to Paradise (2000 AD Prog 245) The Multi-Storey Mind Mellows Out! (2000 AD Prog 254) Genius Is Pain (2000 AD Prog 299) Ro-Jaws' Robo-Tales: The Killer in the Cab (2000 AD Prog 170) The Dating Game (2000 AD Prog 176)	19 June 2019
49	34	Sláine: Volume Five	Sláine: Bowels of Hell (2000 AD Prog 1000) Treasures of Britain book 1 (2000 AD Progs 1001–1010) Ukko's Tale/The Cloak of Fear (2000 AD Progs 1011–1012) Treasures of Britain book 2 (2000 AD Progs 1024–1031) The Demon Hitchhiker (2000 AD Prog 1032) King of Hearts (2000 AD Progs 1033–1039) The Arrow of God (2000 Ad Annual 1989)	3 July 2019
50	53	Bad Company: Volume Two	Bad Company II: The Krool Heart (2000 AD Progs 576–585) Young Men Marching (2000 AD Annual 1989) Simply (2000 AD Prog 601) Kano (2000 AD Progs 828–837) Down Among the Dead Men (2000 AD Prog 2001) Saving Private Franks (2000 AD Progs 2002 & 1273–1277)	17 July 2019
51	03	Judge Dredd: Dark Justice	Judge Dredd: Dark Justice (2000 AD Progs 2015, (Note: Prog 2015 was the prog between 1911 and 1912, as the 2015 annual issue) 1912–1921) Dreams of Deadworld: Dreams of Deadworld (2000 AD Progs 1946–1949) The Fall of Deadworld: Tainted: The Fall of Deadworld (2000 AD Progs 1973–1981) Winter Break: The Fall of Deadworld Interlude (2000 AD Prog 2011) Cursed: The Fall of Deadworld (2000 AD Progs 2023–2033)	31 July 2019
52	09	Strontium Dog: Volume Six	Strontium Dog: The Royal Affair (2000 AD Progs 532–536) The Rammy (2000 AD Progs 544–553) Stone Killers (2000 AD Progs 560–572) Incident on Zeta (2000 AD Prog 573) The No-Go Job (2000 AD Progs 580–587) The Beast of Milton Keynes (2000 AD Annual 1986) Complaint (2000 AD Annual 1987)	14 August 2019
53	76	Nikolai Dante: Volume Five	Nikolai Dante: Hell and High Water (2000 AD Progs 2003, (Note: Prog 2003 was the prog between 1321 and 1322, as the 2003 annual issue) 1322–1328) The Sea Falcon (2000 AD Prog 2004 (Note: Prog 2004 was the prog between 1370 and 1371, as the 2004 annual issue)) Agent of Destruction (2000 AD Progs 2005, (Note: Prog 2005 was the prog between 1419 and 1420, as the 2005 annual issue) 1420–1427) How Could You Believe Me...? (2000 AD Progs 1428–1431) Primal Screams (2000 AD Progs 1433–1436) Devil's Deal (2000 AD Prog 2006) Usurper (2000 AD Progs 1487–1489) The Depths (2000 AD Progs 1500–1501)	28 August 2019
54	35	Sláine: Volume Six	Sláine: The Grail War (2000 AD Progs 1040–1049) Secret of the Grail (2000 AD Progs 1090–1099) Lord of the Beasts (2000 AD Prog 1100) Kai (2000 AD Progs 1104–1107) The Banishing (2000 AD Progs 1108–1109)	11 September 2019
55	50	Rogue Trooper: Volume Four	Rogue Trooper: Just Routine (2000 AD Prog 378) Blind Terror (2000 AD Progs 379–380) Death Valley (2000 AD Progs 381–383) M for Murder (2000 AD Progs 384–386) To the Ends of Nu-Earth (2000 AD Progs 387–392) Re-Gene (2000 AD Progs 401–406) Return of Rogue Trooper (2000 AD Progs 410–419) Antigen of Horst (2000 AD Progs 422–432) Return to Milli-Com (2000 AD Progs 444–449)	25 September 2019
56	27	ABC Warriors: The Volgan War Vol. One	ABC Warriors: The Volgan War: Book One (2000 AD Progs 2007, 1518–1525) The Volgan War: Book Two (2000 AD Progs 1550–1559)	9 October 2019
57	10	Strontium Dog: Volume Seven	Strontium Dog: The Final Solution: Part 1 (2000 AD Progs 600–606, 615–621, 636–641, 645–647) The Final Solution: Replay (2000 AD Prog 682) The Final Solution: Part Two (2000 AD Progs 683–687) Roadhouse (2000 AD Progs 1300–1307)	23 October 2019
58	36	Sláine: Volume Seven	Sláine: The Triple Death (2000 AD Prog 1111) The Swan Children (2000 AD Progs 1112–1114) Macha (2000 AD Progs 1115–1118) Beyond (2000 AD Prog 2000) The Secret Commonwealth (2000 AD Progs 1183–1199)	6 November 2019
59	54	Hewligan's Haircut	Sooner or Later: Sooner or Later (2000 AD Progs 468–499) Swifty's Return (2000 AD Progs 614–617) Hewligan's Haircut: Hewligan's Haircut (2000 AD Progs 700–707) The Zaucer Of Zilk: The Zaucer Of Zilk (2000 AD Progs 1775–1784) Tharg's Future Shocks: 60 Hours That Shook The World (2000 AD Prog 391) Bad Maxwell (2000 AD Prog 402) One Offs: Breathless (2000 AD Prog 420)	20 November 2019
60	62	Invasion!	Invasion!: The Resistance (2000 AD Progs 1–5) Wembley (2000 AD Prog 6) Train Story (2000 AD Prog 7) Concorde (2000 AD Prog 8) Ships (2000 AD Prog 9) Dartmoor (2000 AD Progs 10–11) Death Line (2000 AD Prog 12) The Doomsdale Scenario (2000 AD Progs 13–15) Bounty Hunter (2000 AD Prog 16) Slaves (2000 AD Prog 17) Breakout (2000 AD Prog 18) The Road to Hell (2000 AD Prog 19) Hell's Angels (2000 AD Prog 20) Sandringham (2000 AD Prog 21) Cheddar Gorge (2000 AD Prog 22) Tyne Tunnel (2000 AD Prog 23) Hadrian's Wall (2000 AD Prog 24) Bathtub (2000 AD Prog 25) Bluebird (2000 AD Prog 26) Dirty Jocks (2000 AD Progs 27–31) Volgess (2000 AD Progs 32–33) Collaborator (2000 AD Prog 34) New Recruits (2000 AD Prog 35) Jump Jet (2000 AD Prog 36) The Prince (2000 AD Progs 37–44) The Return of Rosa (2000 AD Prog 45) Deadlier Than The Male! (2000 AD Prog 46) Escape from Liverpool (2000 AD Progs 47–51)	4 December 2019
61	37	Sláine: Book of Invasions: Volume One	Sláine: Moloch (2000 AD Prog 2003, Progs 1322–1326) Golamh (2000 AD Progs 1350–1355) Scota (2000 AD Prog 2004, Progs 1371–1376) Tara (2000 AD Prog 2005, Progs 1420–1425)	18 December 2019
62	77	Nikolai Dante: Volume Six	Nikolai Dante: Dragon's Island (2000 AD Progs 1502–1507) Sword of the Tsar (2000 AD Progs 1511–1516) Road of Bones (2000 AD Prog 2007) Deadlier than the Male (2000 AD Progs 1518–1520) Hellfire (2000 AD Progs 1526–1531) The Beast of Rudinshtein (2000 AD Progs 1532–1535) The Dissenter (2000 AD Prog 1537) Thieves' World (2000 AD Progs 1538–1544)	1 January 2020
63	28	ABC Warriors: The Volgan War: Vol. Two	ABC Warriors: The Volgan War: Book Three (2000 AD Progs 1601–1606, 1611–1616) The Volgan War: Book Four (2000 AD Progs 1666–1677)	15 January 2020
64	70	Caballistics, Inc.: Volume One	Caballistics Inc: Going Underground (2000 AD Progs 1322–1326) Moving In (2000 AD Progs 1331–1333) Breaking Out (2000 AD Progs 1337–1340) Downtime (2000 AD Progs 1363–1368) Krystalnacht (2000 AD Prog 2004) Picking Up the Pieces (2000 AD Prog 1400) Creepshow (2000 AD Progs 1401–1408) Weird War Tales (2000 AD Prog 2005) Safehouse (2000 AD Progs 1420–1424)	29 January 2020
65	13	Strontium Dog: The Life and Death of Johnny Alpha	Strontium Dog: The Life and Death of Johnny Alpha (2000 AD Progs 1689–1699) Chapter Two: The Project (2000 AD Progs 2012, 1764–1771) Chapter Three: Mutant Spring (2000 AD Progs 2013, 1813–1821) Chapter Four: Dogs of War (2000 AD Progs 2014, (Note: Prog 2014 was the prog between 1861 and 1862, as the 2014 annual issue) 1862–1870)	12 February 2020
66	38	Sláine: Book of Invasions: Volume Two	Sláine: Odacon (2000 AD Progs 1436–1442) Carnival (2000 AD Progs 1469–1475) The Gong Beater (2000 AD Progs 1635–1638) The Smuggler (2000 AD Progs 1662–1665)	26 February 2020
67	51	Rogue Trooper: Volume Five	Rogue Trooper: Cinnabar (2000 AD Progs 624-630 & 633–635) What Lies Beneath (2000 AD Progs 1301–1304) Weapons of War (2000 AD Prog 1305) Overkill (2000 AD Progs 1306–1307) Lions (2000 AD Progs 1308–1309) A Visit to the Boneyard (2000 AD Progs 1310–1311) Requiem (2000 AD Prog 1312) Angels (2000 AD Ghouls (2000 AD Progs 1344–1349) Realpolitik (2000 AD Progs 1380–1385) Condor Six Down (2000 AD Progs 1462–1464) Dead Ringer (2000 AD Prog 2011) What If? Gunnar Survived the Quartz Zone Massacre (2000 AD Prog 1771)	11 March 2020
68	66	Ampney Crucis Investigates...	Ampney Crucis Investigates...: Vile Bodies (2000 AD Progs 1611–1616) The End of the Pier Show (2000 AD Progs 1666–1671) The List Of Ten (2000 AD Progs 1715–1723) The English Assassin (2000 AD Progs 1750–1760) The Entropy Tango (2000 AD Progs 1813–1822)	25 March 2020
69	78	Nikolai Dante: Volume Seven	Nikolai Dante: The Chaperone (2000 AD Progs 1560–1564) Destiny's Child (2000 AD Prog 2008) The Tsar's Daughter (2000 AD Progs 1578–1580) Amerika Prisoner of the Tsar (2000 AD Progs 1612–1616) Bring Me the Head of Nikolai Dante (2000 AD Prog 2009) An Army of Thieves and Whores (2000 AD Progs 1629–1634)	8 April 2020
70	39	Sláine: Book Of Scars	Sláine: The Exorcist (2000 AD Progs 1709–1712) The Mercenary (2000 AD Progs 1713–1714) The Book Of Scars (2000 AD Progs 1844–1849) Red Branch (2000 AD 40th Anniversary Special)	6 May 2020
71	59	Durham Red: The Scarlet Cantos	Durham Red: The Scarlet Cantos (2000 AD Progs 1078–1083, 1085–1089) Mask of the Red Death (2000 AD Progs 1111) The Vermin Stars (2000 AD Progs 1250–1261) The Empty Suns Book (2000 AD Progs 1362–1368, 1382–1386)	27 May 2020
72	56	All Star Future Shocks	Tharg's Future Shocks: Hunted (2000 AD Annual 1978) Wings (2000 AD Prog 28) Play Pool! (2000 AD Prog 36) Solo Flip (2000 AD Prog 52) Together (2000 AD Prog 108) Sid (2000 AD Prog 286) The War Game (2000 AD Prog 287) The Castaway (2000 AD Prog 390) Nerves Of Steel (2000 AD Prog 408) But Is It Art? (2000 AD Prog 409) Eggravation (2000 AD Prog 420) Car Wars (2000 AD Prog 434) Project Salvation (2000 AD Prog 436) The Revenge Of The Yallop Cringe (2000 AD Prog 438) It's the thought that counts (2000 AD Prog 442) Hotel Harry Felix (2000 AD Prog 463) The Alteration (2000 AD Prog 466) Alien Aid (2000 AD Prog 469) Some People Never Listen (2000 AD Prog 475) The Shop That Sold Everything (2000 AD Prog 477) Wheels of Fury (2000 AD Prog 481) Curse Your Lucky Star (2000 AD Prog 482) You're Never Alone With A Phone (2000 AD Prog 488) Conversation Piece (2000 AD Prog 489) Maniac For Hire (2000 AD Prog 507) Fruitcake and Veg (2000 AD Progs 508–509) It's A Mad, Mad, Mad World (2000 AD Prog 509) Fair Exchange (2000 AD Prog 514) The Invisible Etchings Of Salvador Dalí (2000 AD Prog 515) Big Trouble for Blast Barclay (2000 AD Prog 516) The Night Shift (2000 AD Prog 535) I'm a Believer (2000 AD Prog 536) Return to Sender (2000 AD Annual 1987) What's in a Name? (2000 AD Prog 538) Plastic Surgeon (2000 AD Prog 567) Accident (2000 AD Prog 608) The Foreign Model (2000 AD Prog 643) Self Awareness (2000 AD Prog 648) The Toast (2000 AD Prog 660) The Last Supper (2000 AD Prog 1205) Old Red (2000 AD Prog 1232) Super Bean (2000 AD Prog 245) Danger: Genius At Work (2000 AD Prog 479) Candy And The Catchman (2000 AD Prog 491) Time Enough To Tell (2000 AD Prog 473) A Change Of Scenery (2000 AD Prog 490) No Exit (2000 AD Prog 559) One Man's Meat (2000 AD Prog 563) The Osmotic Man (2000 AD Prog 605) Opening Moves (2000 AD Prog 629) Earthsong (2000 AD Prog 1480) The Ship That Liked To Dance (2000 AD Prog 501) Fair's Fare (2000 AD Prog 530)	10 June 2020
73	40	Sláine: The Brutania Chronicles: Vol. One	Sláine: A Simple Killing (2000 AD Progs 1874 - 1886) Primordial (2000 AD Progs 1924 - 1936)	24 June 2020
74	79	Nikolai Dante: Volume Eight	Nikolai Dante: Lulu's War (2000 AD Progs 1651–1654) Hero of the Revolution (2000 AD Progs 2010, 1666–1675) Heroes Be Damned (2000 AD Progs 1679–1684) A Farewell to Arms (2000 AD Prog 1685) City of the Damned (2000 AD Progs 1700–1704) The Master of Kronstadt (2000 AD Progs 1705–1708)	8 July 2020
75	63 (Note: The spine incorrectly showed '79' instead of '63', although the number shown correctly inside as '63' (79 was the volume in the previous issue) - the spine picture is also incorrectly showing that of volume 79. The publisher issued a free replacement copy of this volume with issue 81 ("Flesh"))	Savage: Taking Liberties	Savage: Taking Liberties (2000 AD Progs 1387–1396) Out of Order (2000 AD Progs 1450–1459) Double Yellow (2000 AD Progs 1526–1535)	22 July 2020
76	69	Sinister Dexter: Volume Three	Downlode Tales: Lock And Lode (2000 AD Progs 1155–1168) Sinister Dexter: Exit Wounds (2000 AD Prog 2000) Mission To Mangapore (2000 AD Progs 1189–1197) Life Behind Bars (2000 AD Progs 1198–1199) Shrink Rap (2000 AD Progs 1206–1211) Bullet Time (2000 AD Prog 2001) The Man in the Ion Mask (2000 AD Progs 1223–1226) Money Shots (2000 AD Progs 1227–1228) Point Blanc (2000 AD Progs 1231–1233) Barf Bag (2000 AD Progs 1243–1245)	5 August 2020
77	80	Nikolai Dante: Volume Nine	Nikolai Dante: The Memoirs of Nikolai Dante (2000 AD Prog 1731) Bad Blood (2000 AD Progs 1732–1736) The Wedding of Jena Makarov (2000 AD Progs 1764–1773) The Dante Gambit (2000 AD Progs 1774–1779) Sympathy for the Devil (2000 AD Progs 1786–1791)	19 August 2020
78	64	The Grievous Journey of Ichabod Azrael (and the Dead Left in his Wake)	The Grievous Journey of Ichabod Azrael (and the Dead Left in his Wake): The Grievous Journey of Ichabod Azrael (and the Dead Left in his Wake) (2000 AD Progs 1677 - 1688) Manhunt (2000 AD Progs 1789–1799) One Last Bullet (2000 AD Progs 1901–1910)	2 September 2020
79	41	Sláine: The Brutania Chronicles: Vol. Two	Sláine: Psychopomp (2000 AD Progs 1979 - 1988) Archon (2000 AD Progs 2050 - 2060)	16 September 2020
80	71	Caballistics, Inc.: Volume Two	Caballistics Inc: Northern Dark (2000 AD Progs 1443–1448) Strange Bedfellows (2000 AD Prog 2006) Changelings (2000 AD Progs 1469–1474) Ashes (2000 AD Progs 1551–1558) The Nativity (2000 AD Prog 2008) Visiting Hour (2000 AD Prog 2111) Absalom: Noblesse Oblige (2000 AD Progs 1732–1739) Ghosts of London (2000 AD Progs 1765–1771)	30 September 2020
81	86	Flesh	Flesh: Flesh: Book One (2000 AD Progs 1–19) Flesh: Book Two (2000 AD Progs 86–99) Hand of Glory (2000 AD Prog 1526) Texas (2000 AD Progs 1724–1733)	14 October 2020
82	101	Firekind / Leatherjack	Firekind: Firekind (2000 AD Progs 828–840) Leatherjack: Leatherjack (2000 AD Progs 1450–1467)	28 October 2020
83	87	The Red Seas: Volume One	The Red Seas: Under the Banner of King Death (2000 AD Progs 1313–1321) Twilight of the Idols (2000 AD Progs 2004,1371-1379) Meanwhile... (2000 AD Progs 1416–1419) Underworld (2000 AD Progs 1460–1468)	11 November 2020
84	97	Lobster Random	Lobster Random: No Gain, No Pain (2000 AD Progs 1342–1349) Tooth and Claw (2000 AD Progs 1411–1419) The Agony and the Ecstasy (2000 AD Progs 1482–1490) The Vort: The Vort (2000 AD Progs 1589–1596) Lobster Random: The Forget-Me-Knot (2000 AD Progs 1601–1610)	25 November 2020
85	81	Savage: The Guv'nor	Savage: The Guv'nor (2000 AD Progs 1577–1586) 1984 (2000 AD Progs 1632–1641) Crims (2000 AD 1685–1699)	9 December 2020
86	93	The Ten-Seconders: American Dream	The Ten-Seconders: The American Dream (2000 AD Prog 2006 & Progs 1469–1479) Make. Believe. (2000 AD Progs 1578–1588) Godsend (2000 AD Progs 1839–1849) Harris' Quest for the Perfect Xmas Pint (2000 AD Prog 2014)	23 December 2020
87	88	The Red Seas: Volume Two	The Red Seas: The Hollow Land (2000 AD Progs 1491–1499) With a Bound he was Free... (2000 AD Progs 1513–1517) War Stories (2000 AD 1562–1566) Old Dogs (2000 AD Progs 1600–1609)	6 January 2021
88	107	Brink: Volume One	Brink: Brink (2000 AD Progs 1978–1992) Skeleton Life (2000 AD Progs 2023–2040)	20 January 2021
89	92	Fiends of the Eastern Front	Fiends Of The Eastern Front: Fiends of The Eastern Front (2000 AD Progs 152–161) Stalingrad (Judge Dredd Megazine 4.17) 1812 (2000 AD Progs 2100–2105) Fiends of The Western Front (2000 AD Progs 2111–2115) Strange Meeting (2000 AD Sci-Fi Special 2019)	3 February 2021
90	83	Greysuit	Greysuit: Project Monarch (2000 AD Progs 1540–1549) The Old Man of the Mountains (2000 AD Progs 2009, 1617–1624) Prince Of Darkness (2000 AD Progs 1901–1911) Foul Play (2000 AD Progs 2040–2049)	17 February 2021
91	105	The V.C.s: Volume One	The V.C.s: The V.C.s (2000 AD Progs 140–143, 145–165, 168–169, 171–175) Book One (2000 AD Progs 1300–1306) Escher's Well (2000 AD Prog 2003)	3 March 2021
92	103	Indigo Prime: Volume One	Future Shocks: A Change of Scenery (2000 AD Prog 490) Fervent & Lobe: The Issigiri Variations (2000 AD Progs 642–649) Indigo Prime: Indigo Prime (2000 AD Prog 678) Indigo Prime's Winwood & Chord: Downtime (2000 AD Progs 680–681) Indigo Prime's Fegredo & Brecht: How the Land Lied (2000 AD Prog 682) Indigo Prime: Almaranda: Solstice (2000 AD Progs 720–721) Fervent & Lobe: Holiday on Ice (2000 AD Winter Special 1990) Indigo Prime: Winwood & Cord: Killing Time (2000 AD Progs 735–744) Indigo Prime: Dead Eyes (2000 AD Progs 1577–1588)	17 March 2021
93	89	The Red Seas: Volume Three	The Red Seas: Signs & Portents (2000 AD Progs 2009 & 1617–1623) The Chimes at Midnight (2000 AD Progs 1644–1649 Hell and High Water (2000 AD Progs 1688–1699)	31 March 2021
94	95	Dominion	Dominion: Dominion (Judge Dredd Megazine 386–391) Memories are Made of This (2000 AD Prog 2073) Torture Garden (Judge Dredd Megazine 400–409)	14 April 2021
95	82	Savage: Rise Like Lions	Savage: Secret City (2000 AD Progs 1740–1749) Rise Like Lions (2000 AD Progs 2013 & 1813–1823) Grinders (2000 AD Progs 1912–1923)	28 April 2021
96	98	Jaegir	Jaegir: Strigoi (2000 AD Progs 1874–1879) Circe (2000 AD Progs 1893–1898) Brothers in Arms (2000 AD Prog 2015) Tartarus (2000 AD Progs 1937–1944) Warchild (2000 AD Progs 1996–1999) In The Realm of Pyrrhus (2000 AD Progs 2073–2078) Bonegrinder (2000 AD Progs 2118–2122) Valkyrie (2000 AD Progs 2144–2149)	12 May 2021
97	109	Grey Area: Volume One	Grey Area: Meet & Greet (2000 AD Progs 2012, 1764–1766) Feel the Noise (2000 AD Progs 1767–1769) The Do (2000 AD Prog 1770) Personal Space (2000 AD Progs 1771–1773) Xenophobia (2000 AD Prog 1774) One of Our Own (2000 AD Progs 1785–1788) This Island Earth (2000 AD Progs 1800–1804) Something to Declare (2000 AD Prog 2014) Did You Pack Your Own Luggage? (2000 AD Progs 1863–1864) Short Straw (2000 AD Prog 1865) All God's Children (2000 AD Progs 1866–1868) Rates of Exchange (2000 AD Progs 1869–1871) Visitation (2000 AD Prog 1872) I.D., Please (2000 AD Prog 1873) Nearer My God to Thee (2000 AD Progs 1884–1888)	26 May 2021
98	84	Defoe: Volume One	Defoe: 1666 (2000 AD Progs 1540–1549) Brethren of the Night (2000 AD Progs 1589–1598) Queen of the Zombies (2000 AD Progs 1640–1649) A Murder of Angels (2000 AD Progs 1700–1709)	9 June 2021
99	104	Indigo Prime: Volume Two	Indigo Prime: Everything and More (2000 AD Progs 1750–1753) Anthropocalypse (2000 AD Progs 1756–1763) Perfect Day (2000 AD Progs 1880–1887) A Dying Art (2000 AD Progs 2050–2058) Fall of the House of Vista (2000 AD Progs 2139–2148)	23 June 2021
100	106	The V.C.s: Volume Two	The V.C.s: Book II (2000 AD Progs 1327–1335) Book III (2000 AD Progs 2004, 1371–1379) Book IV (2000 AD Progs 1432–1441) Book V (2000 AD Progs 1486–1495)	7 July 2021
101	90	The Red Seas: Volume Four	The Red Seas: Gods & Monsters (2000 AD Progs 1728–1739) Beautiful Freak (2000 AD Progs 1792–1796) Fire Across the Deep (2000 AD Progs 2013, 1813–1823)	21 July 2021
102	96	Mercy Heights	Mercy Heights: Book One (2000 AD Progs 1033–1047) Dead of Winter (2000 AD Prog 1124) Book Two (2000 AD Progs 1133–1148) Rogue Trooper: Remembrance Day (2000 AD Prog 2000 Tor Cyan: Blue Murder (2000 AD Progs 1223–1226) Crucible (2000 AD Progs 1250–1251) Refugee (2000 AD Progs 1252–1253)	4 August 2021
103	99	Absalom	Absalom: Sick Leave (2000 AD Prog 2012) Dirty Postcards (2000 AD Prog 2013) Old Pals' Act (2000 AD Prog 2014) Under a False Flag (2000 AD Progs 1934–1942) Family Snapshots (2000 AD Prog 1961) Terminal Diagnosis: Book One (2000 AD Progs 2053–2060) Terminal Diagnosis: Book Two (2000 AD Progs 2136–2143) Graduation Day (2000 AD Prog 2162)	18 August 2021
104	108	Brink: Volume Two	Brink: High Society (2000 AD Progs 2100–2118) Hate Box (2000 AD Progs 2150–2169)	1 September 2021
105	91	The Order	The Order: The Order (2000 AD Progs 2015, 1912–1922) In the Court of the Wyrmqueen (2000 AD Progs 1961–1972) Wyrm War (2000 AD Progs 2011–2022) The New World (2000 AD Progs 2087–2099)	15 September 2021
106	110	Grey Area: Volume Two	Grey Area: Another Day on the Job (2000 AD Prog 1924) Just Routine Questions (2000 AD Progs 1925–1926) Locked In (2000 AD Progs 1927–1930) Talk Down (2000 AD Prog 1931) Contact (2000 AD Prog 1945) First Bite (2000 AD Prog 1946) Feeding Frenzy (2000 AD Prog 1947) Deadline (2000 AD Prog 1948) Endgame (2000 AD Prog 1982) Big Day (2000 AD Prog 1983) Until Death (2000 AD Prog 1984) Last Call (2000 AD Prog 1985) Congruence (2000 AD Prog 1986) A Long Way Home (2000 AD Prog 1987) Back in Black (2000 AD Prog 2035–2036) Batch Recall (2000 AD Prog 2037) Man Flu (2000 AD Prog 2038) Life on Earth (2000 AD Prog 2039) Border Ops (2000 AD Progs 2040–2041) Lutwot Holiday (2000 AD Prog 2042) Signal Six Twenty-Four (2000 AD Progs 2043–2044) Homeland Security (2000 AD Progs 2050–2053) K.I.A. (2000 AD Progs 2090–2091) Suspension (2000 AD Prog 2092) 86 (2000 AD Prog 2093) The Laundry Room (2000 AD Prog 2094) Objectives (2000 AD Progs 2095–2096) Evidence (2000 AD Prog 2097) Every Dirty Job (2000 AD Prog 2098) Whistleblower (2000 AD Prog 2118) Rogue (2000 AD Prog 2119) Hunted (2000 AD Prog 2120) The Grey and the Black (2000 AD Prog 2121) Shoot to Kill (2000 AD Prog 2122) Making History (2000 AD Progs 2123–2125)	29 September 2021
107	85	Defoe: Volume Two	Defoe: The Damned (2000 AD Progs 1836–1847) Frankensteiner (2000 AD Winter Special 2014) The London Hanged (2000 AD Progs 1950–1960) Diehards (2000 AD Progs 2026–2039)	13 October 2021
108	100	Tales of Telguuth	Tales of Telguuth: A Little Knowledge (2000 AD Prog 1191) Talking Heads (2000 AD Prog 1192) Music of the Spheres (2000 AD Prog 1193) The Eternal Bliss of Zebra Horath (2000 AD Prog 1194) To Become a God (2000 AD Prog 1195) The Bride of Ballakruz-Krim (2000 AD Prog 1196) Men of Snakewood (2000 AD Prog 1197) Uhuros the Horrendous (2000 AD Prog 1198) The Conqueror Wummb (2000 AD Prog 1199) The Transfiguration of Tesro Karnik (2000 AD Progs 1227–1229) The Oscillations of Tramasellion (2000 AD Progs 1235–1236) The Caverns of Garnek-Spay (2000 AD Progs 1240–1242) The Hunting of the Veks (2000 AD Prog 1249) The Vileness of Scromyx (2000 AD Progs 1258–1260) The Infinite Return of Varkor Gan (2000 AD Prog 1263) The Atrocities of Pagafruuz Jeel (2000 AD Prog 1283) The Colossal Wealth of Karn Foul-Eye (2000 AD Prog 1284) The Wheels of Fortune (2000 AD Progs 1285–1286) The Rousing of Rezik (2000 AD Progs 1287–1288) The Black Arts of Skrixlan Nort (2000 AD Prog 1329) Pagrok the Infallible (2000 AD Progs 1330–1331) One Cold Winter Night... (2000 AD Prog 1332) The Iniquities of Snedron (2000 AD Progs 1333–1334) Holding the Fort (2000 AD Prog 1369) The Eternal Life of Emperor Ygg (2000 AD Prog 1370)	27 October 2021
109	102	Tyranny Rex	Tyranny Rex: Tyranny Rex (2000 AD Progs 566–568) Under Foreign Skies (2000 AD Progs 582–584) Playing God (2000 AD Sci-Fi Special 1988) Soft Bodies (2000 AD Progs 595–598, 604) Systems of Romance (2000 AD Sci-Fi Special 1989) Bitter Fruit (2000 AD Yearbook 1994) Deus Ex Machina: Book One (2000 AD Progs 852–859) Deus Ex Machina: Book Two (2000 AD Progs 873–880) The Comeback (2000 AD Progs 1395–1399)	10 November 2021
110	94	Judge Dredd: The Small House	Judge Dredd: The Man Comes Around (Judge Dredd Megazine 344) Fit (2000 AD Prog 1873) Enceladus: New Life (2000 AD Progs 1924–1928) Enceladus: Old Life (2000 AD Progs 1940–1947) Get Sin (2000 AD Progs 2001–2003) Act of Grud (2000 AD Progs 2004–2006) The Fields (2000 AD Progs 2035–2036) Fit for Purpose (2000 AD Progs 2073–2074) The Small House (2000 AD Progs 2100–2109) Control (2000 AD Progs 2141–2145)	24 November 2021
111	111	Strontium Dog: Repo Men	Strontium Dog: The Stix Fix (2000 AD Progs 1924–1933) Repo Men (2000 AD Progs 1961–1971) The Son (2000 AD Progs 2073–2081)	8 December 2021
112	114	Strontium Dogs: Volume One	Strontium Dog: The Tax Dodge (2000 AD Progs 1350–1358) Durham Red: The 'Nobody Wants This Job' Job (2000 AD Progs 1785–1790) Island of the Damned (2000 AD Progs 762–773) Ring My Bell (2000 AD Yearbook 1993) Strontium Dog: Dead Man's Hand (2000 AD Yearbook 1993)	22 December 2021
113	121	Cradlegrave	Cradlegrave: Cradlegrave (2000 AD Progs 1633–1644) A Love Like Blood: A Love Like Blood (2000 AD Progs 1243–1249) Stone Island: Stone Island (2000 AD Progs 1500–1507) The Harrowers: The Harrowers (2000 AD Progs 1550–1559)	5 January 2022
114	137	Sinister Dexter: Volume Four	Sinister Dexter: Wising Off (2000 AD Prog 1311) Low Life (2000 AD Prog 1312) The Off-Lode Experience (2000 AD Progs 1313–1321) Relode (2000 AD Progs 1322–1325) Oh Kal Cutter (2000 AD Prog 1348) Junk Bond (2000 AD Progs 1356–1361) Just Business (2000 AD Progs 1380–1382) Job Jobbed (2000 AD Progs 1383–1385) Scare Tactics (2000 AD Progs 1397–1399) Slow Train to Kal Cutter (2000 AD Progs 1443–1449)	19 January 2022
115	112	ABC Warriors: Return to Earth	ABC Warriors: Return to Earth (2000 AD Progs 1800–1811) Return to Mars (2000 AD Progs 2014, 1862–1866, 1868–1873)	2 February 2022
116	122	Brass Sun: Volume One	Brass Sun: The Wheel of Worlds (2000 AD Progs 1800–1811) The Diamond Age (2000 AD Progs 1850–1861)	16 February 2022
117	118	The Mean Arena: Volume One	The Mean Arena: The Southampton Sharks (2000 AD Progs 178–180, 182–187, 191–194, 197–202) The Jensens (2000 AD Progs 218–223) The Penzance Riggers (2000 AD Progs 226–229, 234-235 (Note: The section title page only shows Progs 226-229)) The Salford Slicers (2000 AD Progs 236-238 (Note: The section title page shows Progs 234-238)) The Edinburgh Executioners (2000 AD Progs 239-244 (Note: The section title page shows Progs 239-247))	2 March 2022
118	115	Strontium Dogs: Volume Two	Strontium Dogs: Monsters (2000 AD Progs 750–761) Return of the Gronk (2000 AD Progs 817–824) How the Gronk Got His Heartses (2000 AD Progs 850–851) The Darkest Star (2000 AD Progs 855–866) The Cage (Strontium Dogs Poster Prog #1)	16 March 2022
119	132	Rogue Trooper: The War Machine	Rogue Trooper: The War Machine (2000 AD Progs 650–653, 667-671 & 683–687) Enfleshings (2000 AD Yearbook 1993) Hollow Town (2000 AD Sci-Fi Special 1991) Hill 392 (Rogue Trooper Poster Prog #1) Judge Dredd: Casualties of War (2000 AD Prog 900) Glimmer Rats: Glimmer Rats (2000 AD Progs 2000 & 1174–1182)	30 March 2022
120	126	Finn: Volume One	Finn: Finn - Book One (2000 AD Progs 770–779) Finn - Book Two (2000 AD Progs 807–816) Finn - The Origin (2000 AD Progs 924–927)	13 April 2022
121	119	The Mean Arena: Volume Two	Mean Arena: The Oxford Invaders (2000 AD Progs 248–251, 253–255, 258–259) The Allerton Ants (2000 AD Progs 261–267) Mother Vlad's Vampires (2000 AD Progs 268–279) The Videogame (2000 AD Progs 280–282) Slaughterbowl: Slaughterbowl (2000 AD Progs 842–849)	27 April 2022
122	136	The Fall of Deadworld	The Fall of Deadworld: Home (2000 AD Prog 2050) Ava (2000 AD Prog 2061) Damned (2000 AD Progs 2081–2092) Running Scared (2000 AD Prog 2111) Doomed (2000 AD Progs 2150–2161) Sidney (2000 AD Prog 2162) Visions of Deadworld: Last Man Standing (2000 AD Prog 2210) The Good Samaritan (2000 AD Prog 2211) A Girl's Gotta Eat (2000 AD Prog 2212) You Give Me Fever (2000 AD Prog 2225) The Man Who Killed Mortis (2000 AD Prog 2226) Leigh (2000 AD Prog 2227)	11 May 2022
123	124	The Returners	The Returners: Irmazhina (Judge Dredd Megazine 394–399) Chandhu (Judge Dredd Megazine 409–415) Heartswood (Judge Dredd Megazine 424–430) Amazonia (Judge Dredd Megazine 432–438)	25 May 2022
124	123	Brass Sun: Volume Two	Brass Sun: Floating World (2000 AD Progs 1888–1899) Motor Head (2000 AD Engine Summer (2000 AD Progs 2061–2072)	8 June 2022
125	130	Ro-Busters: Volume One	Ro-Busters: North Sea Tunnel (Starlord #1) Preying Mantis (Starlord #2-4) Mid Point (Starlord #5-6) The Ritz Space Hotel (Starlord #7-12) Farnborough Droid Show (Starlord #13-14) Massacre on the Moon (Starlord #15-19) The Tax Man Cometh! (Starlord #20-22) Death on the Orient Express (2000 AD Progs 86–87) Earthquake Control (Starlord Summer Special 1978)	22 June 2022
126	134	Revere	Revere: Book One: Finders Edge (2000 AD Progs 744–749) Book Two: Written In Water (2000 AD Progs 809–814) Book Three (2000 AD Progs 867–872) The Dead: (2000 AD Progs 510–519)	6 July 2022
127	138	Sinister Dexter: Volume Five	Sinister Dexter:...And Death Shall Have Dumb Minions (2000 AD Progs 1459–1468) Festive Spirits (2000 AD Prog 2006) Malone (2000 AD Progs 1500–1506) Places To Go, People To Do (2000 AD Progs 1508–1513) Pros And Cons (2000 AD Progs 1514–1517) Christmas Time (2000 AD Prog 2007) The Last Thing I Do (2000 AD Progs 1528–1533) The Doctor Is In (2000 AD Progs 1535–1538) Normal Service (2000 AD Prog 1539)	20 July 2022
128	135	Samantha Slade, Robo-Hunter	Samantha Slade: Robo-Hunter: Like a Virgin (2000 AD Progs 2004 & 1371–1373) The Furtz Case (2000 AD Progs 1406–1411) The Davinchy Code (2000 AD Prog 2005) Stim! (2000 AD Progs 1450–1456) Casino Royal (2000 AD Progs 1527–1531) I, Jailbird (2000 AD Progs 1545–1549)	3 August 2022
129	131	Ro-Busters: Volume Two	Ro-Busters: The Terra-Meks! (2000 AD Progs 98–101) The Fall & Rise of Ro-Jaws & Hammerstein (2000 AD Progs 103–115) Ro-Jaws: Ordinary Hero (Starlord Annual 1980) Ro-Busters: Avalanche (2000 AD Annual 1980) Meltdown (Starlord Annual 1981) San Andreas Earthquake (2000 AD Annual 1981) Bax the Burner (2000 AD Annual 1982) Storm Eagles are Go! (2000 AD Annual 1984) Ro-Jaws: The Inside Story (2000 AD Prog 144)	17 August 2022
130	125	Devlin Waugh: A Very Large Splash	Devlin Waugh: Blood Debt (Judge Dredd Megazine 388–391) Kiss of Death (Judge Dredd Megazine 397–399) Call Me By Thy Name (Judge Dredd Megazine 400) A Very Large Splash (Judge Dredd Megazine 415–420) The Wolves of St Vitus (Judge Dredd Megazine 422) When I Was a Young Demon (I Did a Bad, Bad Thing) (Judge Dredd Megazine 423) A Question of Trust (Judge Dredd Megazine 430)	31 August 2022
131	133	Blunt	Blunt: Blunt Book One (Judge Dredd Megazine 372–379) Blunt Book Two (Judge Dredd Megazine 400–407) Blunt Book Three (Judge Dredd Megazine 415–422)	14 September 2022
132	113	ABC Warriors: Return to Ro-Busters	ABC Warriors: Return to Ro-Busters (2000 AD Progs 1961–1972) Fallout (2000 AD Progs 2061–2072)	28 September 2022
133	120	Leviathan	Leviathan: Leviathan (2000 AD Progs 1351–1360) Chosen Son (2000 AD Prog 2005) McLean's Last Case (2000 AD Prog 1465) Beyond the Horizon (2000 AD American Gothic: American Gothic (2000 AD Progs 1432–1440) Necronauts: Necronauts (2000 AD Progs 2001, 1223–1230) Chiaroscuro: Chiaroscuro (2000 AD Progs 1507–1517)	12 October 2022
134	139	Sinister Dexter: Volume Six	Sinister Dexter: Life is an Open Casket (2000 AD Progs 1560–1565) Inner Waldorf Hire and Dice (2000 AD Prog 2008) Yer Ass From Yer Elbow (2000 AD Progs 1589–1590) The Bournemouth Identity (2000 AD Progs 1591–1594) The Importance of Fleeing Ernest (2000 AD Progs 1595–1599) Wish You Were Here (2000 AD Progs 1642–1646) Rush From Her With Love (2000 AD Progs 1647–1648) Watch with Motherfunter (2000 AD Prog 1649) Better the Devil Ye Know (2000 AD Progs 1661–1665) The Why-Shaped Cut (2000 AD Progs 1693–1698) Are You Being Severed? (2000 AD Progs 1709–1714)	26 October 2022
135	129	Stickleback: Number of the Beast	Stickleback: Number of the Beast (2000 AD Progs 1824–1835) The Thru'penny Opera (2000 AD Progs 1900–1911) New Jerusalem (2000 AD Progs 2200-2205 & 2207–2210)	2 November 2022
136	128	Black Hawk: The Intergalactic Gladiator	Black Hawk: Black Hawk (Tornado version; Tornado #4-22) Black Hawk (2000 AD version; 2000 AD Progs 127–161)	16 November 2022
137	127	Finn: Volume Two	Finn: Interventions (2000 AD Progs 928-937 & 940–949) Season of the Witch (2000 AD Progs 991–999)	30 November 2022
138	116	Strontium Dogs: Volume Three	Strontium Dogs: Crossroads (2000 AD Progs 897–899) Durham Red: Mirrors (2000 AD Progs 901–903) Ghosts (2000 AD Winter Special 1994) Strontium Dogs: The Alphabet Man (2000 AD Progs 937–939) High Moon (2000 AD Progs 940–947) Durham Red: Diners (2000 AD Sci-Fi Special 1995) Strontium Dogs: The Mutant Sleeps Tonight (2000 AD Prog 957) Durham Red: Deals (2000 AD Progs 960–963) Strontium Dogs: Hate and War (2000 AD Progs 993–999) Durham Red: Night of the Hunters (2000 AD Progs 1000–1005) Epicedium (2000 AD Prog 1006)	14 December 2022
139	140	Sinister Dexter: Volume Seven	Sinister Dexter: Apocalypse Shtick: Charon's Crossing (2000 AD Progs 1740–1744) Apocalypse Shtick: Inverse Ninjas Rule (2000 AD Prog 1745) Apocalypse Shtick: The Dead-End Job (2000 AD Progs 1746–1749) Dirty Deeds Done Dirt Cheap (2000 AD Progs 1761–1763) Now & Again (2000 AD Prog 2012) Witless Protection: Malone Again (2000 AD Progs 1832–1835) Witless Protection: In Plain Shite (2000 AD Progs 1836–1840) Witless Protection: Last Rights (2000 AD Progs 1841–1843) The Generican Dream: Room Only (2000 AD Prog 2014) The Generican Dream: Gun Shy (2000 AD Progs 1874–1879) The Generican Dream: Congo (2000 AD Progs 1889–1892) The Taking of the Michael (2000 AD Progs 1951–1956) Blank Ammo (2000 AD Prog 1961)	4 January 2023
140	117	Middenface McNulty	Middenface McNulty: Wun Man and his Dug (Judge Dredd Megazine 1.15-1.20) Grannibal (Judge Dredd Megazine 3.76) Tambo Shanter (Judge Dredd Megazine 4.11) A Parcel of Rogues (Judge Dredd Megazine 4.16-4.18) Mutopia (Judge Dredd Megazine 205–207) Brigadoom (Judge Dredd Megazine 218–220) Killodon (Judge Dredd Megazine 224–229) A Scottish Sojer (Judge Dredd Megazine 240–243)	18 January 2023
141	161	Al's Baby	Al's Baby: Al's Baby (Judge Dredd Megazine 1.04-15) Blood on the Bib (Judge Dredd Megazine 2.16-2.24) Public Enemy No. 1 (2000 AD Progs 1034–1044)	1 February 2023
142	154	Mean Team	Mean Team: Mean Team (2000 AD Progs 437–447) Return of Mean Team (2000 AD Progs 525–541; not in Progs 532, 536) Survivor (2000 AD Progs 639–644) Bad City Blue: Bad City Blue (2000 AD Progs 468–477)	15 February 2023
143	149	Age of the Wolf	Age of the Wolf: Bad Moon Rising (2000 AD Progs 1700–1708) She Is Legend (2000 AD Progs 1772–1781) Wolfworld (2000 AD Progs 1840–1849)	1 March 2023
144	179	DREDD + Anderson	Judge Dredd: Top of the World, Ma-Ma (Judge Dredd Megazine 328) Underbelly (Judge Dredd Megazine 340–342) Uprise (Judge Dredd Megazine 350–354) Dust (Judge Dredd Megazine 367–371) Judge Anderson: The Deep End (Judge Dredd Megazine 377–378) Judgement Call (Judge Dredd Megazine 379) Judge Dredd: Furies (Judge Dredd Megazine 386–388) The Dead World (Judge Dredd Megazine 392–396)	15 March 2023
145	156	Snow/Tiger: Pax Americana	Snow/Tiger: Pax Americana (2000 AD Progs 1336–1342) Black Light: Survivor Syndrome (2000 AD Progs 1001–1005) Lords of Creation (2000 AD Progs 1006–1009) Pandora's Box (2000 AD Progs 1010–1013) The Bendatti Vendetta: The Bendatti Vendetta (Judge Dredd Megazine 4.13-4.18) Blooded (Judge Dredd Megazine 209–211) See Naples and Die (Judge Dredd Megazine 234–236)	29 March 2023
146	163	Zenith: Volume One	Zenith: Phase One (2000 AD Progs 535–550) Interlude One (2000 AD Prog 558) Interlude Two (2000 AD Prog 559) Phase Two (2000 AD Progs 589–606) Interlude Three (2000 AD Winter Special 1988)	12 April 2023
147	153	Return to Armageddon	Return to Armageddon: Return to Armageddon (2000 AD Progs 185–218) Death Planet: Death Planet (2000 AD Progs 62–70) Project Overkill: Project Overkill (2000 AD Progs 119–126)	26 April 2023
148	162	Mazeworld	Mazeworld: Mazeworld (2000 AD Progs 1014–1023) The Dark Man (2000 AD Progs 1101–1110) The Hell Maze (2000 AD Progs 1151–1160)	10 May 2023
149	178	Judge Dredd: Machine Law	Judge Dredd: Harvey (2000 AD Progs 2024–2029) Machine Law (2000 AD Progs 2115–2122) Guatemala (2000 AD Progs 2150–2157) The Victims of Bennett Beeny (Judge Dredd Megazine 424–426)	24 May 2023
150	157	Kingdom: Volume Three	Kingdom: As It Is In Heaven (2000 AD Progs 2011–2022) Alpha and Omega (2000 AD Progs 2100–2110) Shako's Kingdom (2000 AD Sci-Fi Special 2020) Shako: Shako (2000 AD Progs 20–35)	7 June 2023
151	143	Harlem Heroes: Volume One	Harlem Heroes: Harlem Heroes (2000 AD Progs 1-27) Inferno - Part One (2000 AD Progs 36–41)	21 June 2023
152	165	Button Man: Volume One	Button Man: The Killing Game (2000 AD Progs 780–791) The Confession of Harry Exton (2000 AD Progs 904–919)	5 July 2023
153	141	Slaine: Dragontamer	Sláine: The Bogatyr (2000 AD Prog 2111) Dragontamer (2000 AD Progs 2212–2219, 2221 & 2228) The Lord Weird Slough Feg: Lord of the Hunt (2000 AD Villains Takeover Special 2019) Black Siddha: Black Siddha: Bad Karma (Judge Dredd Megazine 202–208) Black Siddha: Kali Yuga (Judge Dredd Megazine 218–223) Black Siddha: Return of the Jester (Judge Dredd Megazine 245–252)	19 July 2023
154	145	Judge Dredd: End of Days	Judge Dredd: Pets (2000 AD Prog 2134) End of Days (2000 AD Progs 2184-2195 & 2197–2199) Carry the Nine (2000 AD Progs 2200–2203) They Shoot Talking Horses, Don't They? (2000 AD Progs 2204–2205) Elevator Pitch (2000 AD Progs 2088–2089) Unearthed (2000 AD Progs 2124–2125)	2 August 2023
155	155	Thirteen	Thirteen: Thirteen (2000 AD Progs 1289–1299) Carver Hale: Carver Hale: Twisting the Knife (2000 AD Progs 1236-1240 & 1247–1249) Pulp Sci-Fi: Pulp Sci-Fi: Eggs is Eggs (2000 AD Prog 1145) Pulp Sci-Fi: Doin' Time (2000 AD Prog 1147) Future Shocks: Future Shocks: Inside Job (2000 AD Prog 1230) Future Shocks: Right Back at Ya (2000 AD Prog 1287)	16 August 2023
156	164	Zenith: Volume Two	Zenith: Phase Three (2000 AD Progs 626–634, 650–662, 667–670) Interlude Four (2000 AD Annual 1990) Phase Four (2000 AD Progs 791–806) zzzenith.com (2000 AD Prog 2001) Tales of the Alternative Earths (2000 AD Winter Special 1990) Permission to Land (2000 AD Prog 2050)	30 August 2023
157	158	Damnation Station	Damnation Station: To the Dark and Empty Skies (2000 AD Progs 1677–1680) The Feelings That You Lack (2000 AD Prog 1681) The Sun Always Shines (2000 AD Progs 1682–1684) A Bone to be Chewed (2000 AD Progs 1686–1687) Fellas, It's Been Good to Know You (2000 AD Prog 1689) Even Heroes Fail (2000 AD Progs 1690–1692) The Titanic Sails at Dawn (2000 AD Progs 1850–1851) Darkness at the Break of Noon (2000 AD Prog 1852) The Tail of the Dragon (2000 AD Progs 1853–1856) In Another Lifetime (2000 AD Prog 1857) The Howling Beast on the Borderline (2000 AD Progs 1858–1860) After Losing Every Battle (2000 AD Prog 1861) Go Machine: Go Machine (2000 AD Progs 1496–1498) Dead Signal: Dead Signal (2000 AD Progs 1581–1587)	13 September 2023
158	173	Atavar	Atavar: Atavar Book One (2000 AD Progs 1281–1288) Atavar Book Two (2000 AD Progs 1329–1335) Atavar Book Three (2000 AD Progs 1443–1449) Road Kill: Road Kill (2000 AD Progs 1208–1211)	27 September 2023
159	144	Harlem Heroes: Volume Two	Inferno: Inferno - Part Two (2000 AD Progs 42–75)	11 October 2023
160	150	Counterfeit Girl	Counterfeit Girl: Counterfeit Girl (2000 AD Progs 2000-2008 & 2010). Shadows: Shadows (2000 AD Progs 672–681) Bix Barton: Barton's Beasts (2000 AD Progs 663–668) Carry On Barton (2000 AD Progs 723–728) Tribal Memories: Tribal Memories (2000 AD Progs 585–588)	25 October 2023
161	166	Button Man: Volume Two	Button Man: Killer Killer (2000 AD Progs 2001 & 1223–1233) The Hitman's Daughter (2000 AD Progs 1551–1566)	8 November 2023
162	152	Flesh: Midnight Cowboys	Flesh: Midnight Cowboys (2000 AD Progs 1774–1785) Badlanders (2000 AD Progs 1850–1861) Gorehead (2000 AD Progs 2001–2010)	22 November 2023
163	174	Scarlet Traces: Volume One	Scarlet Traces: War of the Worlds (Dark Horse Comics) Scarlet Traces (Judge Dredd Megazine 4.16-4.18) The Great Game (Dark Horse Comics)	6 December 2023
164	159	Proteus Vex	Proteus Vex: Another Dawn (2000 AD Progs 2162-2169 & 2171) The Shadow Chancellor (2000 AD Progs 2212-2219 & 2221–2223) Desire Paths (2000 AD Progs 2262–2274)	20 December 2023
165	151	Survival Geeks	Survival Geeks: Survival Geeks (2000 AD Progs 1824–1826) Steampunk'd (2000 AD Progs 1918–1923) Movie Night (2000 AD Sci-Fi Special 2015) Geeks Fatales (2000 AD Progs 1973–1977) Lord of the Ringers (2000 AD Progs 1978–1981) Geek-Con (2000 AD Progs 2082–2086) Slack n' Hash (2000 AD Progs 2096–2099) Dungeons & Dating (Basic) (2000 AD Progs 2123–2127) Crisis of Infinite Nerds (2000 AD Progs 2175–2182) A Quiet Night In (2000 AD Prog 2212) 'Splorers (2000 AD Prog 2246)	3 January 2024
166	168	Dan Dare: Volume One	Dan Dare: Dan Dare (2000 AD Progs 1–11) Hollow World (2000 AD Progs 12–23) Legion (2000 AD Progs 28–33) Green World (2000 AD Progs 34–35) Star Slayer (2000 AD Progs 36–51)	17 January 2024
167	177	Kingmaker	Kingmaker: Kingmaker (2000 AD Progs 2011–2022) Ouroboros (2000 AD Progs 2123-2129 & 2131–2135) False Shadow (2000 AD Progs 2262-2267 & 2270–2275)	31 January 2024
168	160	Harry Twenty on the High Rock	Harry Twenty on the High Rock: Harry Twenty on the High Rock (2000 AD Progs 287–307) Death Rock: Death Rock (2000 AD Free Comic Book Day issue 2015) Dead Men Walking: Dead Men Walking (2000 AD Progs 1362–1370)	14 February 2024
169	167	The Journal of Luke Kirby	The Journal of Luke Kirby: Summer Magic (2000 AD Progs 571–577) A Winter's Tale (2000 AD Winter Special 1988) The Dark Path (2000 AD Sci-Fi Special' 1990) The Night Walker (2000 AD Progs 800–812) Sympathy for the Devil: Prologue (2000 AD Progs 850–851) Trick or Treat (2000 AD Yearbook 1994) Sympathy for the Devil (2000 AD Progs 873-877 & 884–888) The Old Straight Track (2000 AD Progs 954–963) The Price (2000 AD Prog 972)	28 February 2024
170	171	Durham Red: Born Bad	The Scarlet Apocrypha: Necroculture (Judge Dredd Megazine 4.12) Semblance (Judge Dredd Megazine 4.13) The Spirit and the Gaki (Judge Dredd Megazine 4.14) Children of the Night (Judge Dredd Megazine 4.15) Genegun SD (Judge Dredd Megazine 4.16) Red Menace (Judge Dredd Megazine 4.17) In The Flesh (Judge Dredd Megazine 4.18) Durham Red: Born Bad (2000 AD Progs 2082–2089) Three Gifts (2000 AD Prog 2111) Mistletoe Kiss (2000 AD Prog 2162) Served Cold (2000 AD Progs 2212-2219 & 2221–2223)	13 March 2024
171	147	Armoured Gideon	Armoured Gideon: Armoured Gideon (2000 AD Progs 671 - 681) No, No, Nanette (2000 AD Prog 722) Starhavon's Edge (2000 AD Sci-Fi Special 1990) Making Movies (2000 AD Sci-Fi Special 1992) Book Two (2000 AD Progs 828–840) The Collector (2000 AD Progs 889–899) Trading Places (2000 AD Progs 928–935)	27 March 2024
172	170	Lawless: Breaking Badrock	Lawless: Breaking Badrock (Judge Dredd Megazine 389–394) Ashes to Ashes (Judge Dredd Megazine 400–409) Boom Town (Judge Dredd Megazine 415–423)	10 April 2024
173	175	Scarlet Traces: Volume Two	Scarlet Traces: Cold War - Book One (2000 AD Progs 1988–1999) Cold War - Book Two (2000 AD Progs 2023–2034) Home Front (2000 AD Progs 2126–2138) Storm Front (2000 AD Progs 2250–2261)	24 April 2024
174	180	Anderson, Psi-Division: N.W.O.	Anderson, Psi-Division: Dragon Blood (Judge Dredd Megazine 380–384) NWO (Judge Dredd Megazine 385–390) Jordan Ramzy's Kitchen Nightmare (Judge Dredd Megazine 400) Undertow (2000 AD Progs 2073–2080) Martyrs (2000 AD Progs 2137–2144) SPA Day (2000 AD Sci-Fi Special 2018) The Dead Run (Judge Dredd Megazine 410–414)	8 May 2024
175	176	Hope	Hope:...For the Future (2000 AD Progs 2011-2016 & 2044–2049)...Under Fire (2000 AD Progs 2150–2161)...In the Shadows (2000 AD Progs 2276–2279, 2281–2287, 2289, 2302–2305, 2307-2308 & 2310–2315)	22 May 2024
176	172	The Dark Judges: Deliverance	The Dark Judges: Deliverance (Judge Dredd Megazine 424–433) Death Metal Planet (Judge Dredd Megazine 449–458)	5 June 2024
177	142	Savage: The Marze Murderer	Savage: The Marze Murderer (2000 AD Progs 2001–2010) The Thousand Yard Stare (2000 AD Progs 2061–2071) Defoe: The Divisor (Progs 2150–2161)	19 June 2024
178	146	Judge Dredd: The Red Queen Saga	Orlok: Agent of East-Meg One (2000 AD Sci-Fi Special 2014) Eurozoned (2000 AD Progs 1912–1917) The Rasputin Caper (2000 AD Progs 1924–1929) Judge Dredd: Monkey Business (Judge Dredd Megazine 376–377) Ape Escape (Judge Dredd Megazine 386) Krong Island (Judge Dredd Megazine 392–395) The Red Prince Diaries (Judge Dredd Megazine 404) The Red Queen's Gambit (Judge Dredd Megazine 409–412) Grand Theft Royale (Judge Dredd Megazine 423) The Hard Way (2000 AD Progs 2250–2255) Q-Topia (Judge Dredd Megazine 444) Regicide (Judge Dredd Megazine 445–446)	3 July 2024
179	148	The Mind of Wolfie Smith	The Mind of Wolfie Smith: The Mind of Wolfie Smith (Tornado #1-22) Tornado Summer Special 1979 Tornado Annual 1980 Tornado Annual 1981 The Evil of Matthew Hobb (2000 AD Progs 127–130) Night of the Carnivore (2000 AD Progs 131–145) Book II (2000 AD Progs 162–175, 177)	17 July 2024
180	169	Dan Dare: Volume 2	Dan Dare: Doppelganger (2000 AD Progs 52–55) Waterworld (2000 AD Progs 56–60) Nightmare Planet (2000 AD Progs 61–63) Ice Planet (2000 AD Progs 64–66) Garden of Eden (2000 AD Progs 67–72) Mutiny (2000 AD Progs 73–78) The Doomsday Machine (2000 AD Progs 79–85) Servant of Evil! (2000 AD Progs 100-107 (Note: The section title page also shows Progs 109-126)) Attack on Eternium! (Note: No section title page. Issue numbers included in 'Servant of Evil!', above.) (2000 AD Progs 109–118) Traitor! (2000 AD Progs 119–126)	31 July 2024
181	184	The Out	The Out: Book One (2000 AD Progs 2187-2195 & 2197–2199) Book Two (2000 AD Progs 2250-2255 & 2257–2264) Book Three (2000 AD Progs 2312-2324 & 2331–2333)	14 August 2024
182	191	Thistlebone	Thistlebone: Thistlebone (2000 AD Progs 2135–2144) Poisoned Roots (2000 AD Progs 2221–2232) The Dule Tree (2000 AD Progs 2364–2375)	28 August 2024
183	198	The Harlem Heroes: Volume One	The Harlem Heroes: The Harlem Heroes (Part One) (2000 AD Progs 671–676, 683–699, 701)	11 September 2024
184	181	Strontium Dog: The Starlord Years	Strontium Dog: Max Quirxx (Starlord #1-2) Papa Por-ka (Starlord #3–5) No Cure For Kansyr (Starlord #6–7) Planet of the Dead (Starlord #8–10) Two-Faced Terror! (Starlord #12–15) Demon Maker (Starlord #17–19) The Brain (Starlord #21–22) Funfair of Fear (Starlord Annual 1980) Volva Four (Starlord Annual 1981) The Butterfly (Starlord Annual 1982) Kane's Kolossal Kasino (Starlord Summer Special 1978)	25 September 2024
185	193	Rogue Trooper - Friday: Volume One	Rogue Trooper: The Golden Fox Rebellion (2000 AD Progs 712–723) The Saharan Ice-Belt War (2000 AD Progs 730–741) Apocalypse Dreadnought (2000 AD Progs 780–791)	9 October 2024
186	189	Feral & Foe	Feral & Foe: Book One (2000 AD Progs 2162-2169 & 2172–2174) Book Two (2000 AD Progs 2224-2232 & 2234–2236) Book Three - Bad Godesberg (2000 AD Progs 2351-2355 & 2357–2366)	23 October 2024
187	196	M.A.C.H. 1: Volume One	M.A.C.H. 1: Vulcan (2000 AD Progs 1–2) Battleship (2000 AD Prog 3) To Kill a President (2000 AD Prog 4) Probesnatch (2000 AD Prog 5) Himmler's Gold (2000 AD Prog 6) Bolivia (2000 AD Prog 7) Spain Kidnap (2000 AD Prog 8) Our Man in Turkostan (2000 AD Prog 9) On the Roof of the World (2000 AD Prog 10) Operation Death-Drive! (2000 AD Prog 11) The Laser Hound (2000 AD Prog 12) Airship (2000 AD Prog 13) Chinese Formula (2000 AD Prog 14) Yeti (2000 AD Prog 15) Untitled (2000 AD Summer Special 1977) Capitol (2000 AD Prog 16) Spotbox (2000 AD Prog 17) Skyscraper terrorists (2000 AD Prog 18) Corporal Tanaka (2000 AD Prog 19) Tokyo (2000 AD Prog 20) Recluse (2000 AD Prog 21) Arab Story (2000 AD Prog 22) Spy Plane (2000 AD Prog 23) King Karat (2000 AD Prog 24) Terror Train (2000 AD Prog 25) The Death Trumpet (Note: The contents page adds (also known as "Balls of the Gods") to the title of 'Operation Hercules', however the text material at the back of the volume indicates that this was in fact a working title for 'The Death Trumpet'.) (2000 AD Prog 26) Operation Hercules (2000 AD Annual 1978) Untitled (2000 AD Annual 1978) Planet Killers (2000 AD Progs 27–29) UFO (2000 AD Progs 30–33)	6 November 2024
188	185	Canon Fodder	Canon Fodder: Canon Fodder (2000 AD Progs 861–867) Dark Matter (2000 AD Progs 980–987) Angel Zero: Angel Zero (2000 AD Progs 1751–1763)	20 November 2024
189	182	Skip Tracer: Volume One	Skip Tracer: Heavy is the Head (2000 AD Progs 2081–2089) Legion (2000 AD Progs 2100–2108) Louder Than Bombs (2000 AD Progs 2111–2122)	4 December 2024
190	188	XTNCT	XTNCT: XTNCT (Judge Dredd Megazine 209–214) Ant Wars: Ant Wars (2000 AD Progs 71–85) Hook-Jaw: Hook-Jaw (2000 AD Progs 2200-2205 & 2207–2209)	18 December 2024
191	194	Rogue Trooper - Friday: Volume Two	Rogue Trooper: Decoys (Rogue Trooper Annual 1991) The Undeath Project (Rogue Trooper Annual 1991) Bio-Death (Rogue Trooper Annual 1991) Circus Daze (Rogue Trooper Annual 1991) The Arena of Long Knives (2000 AD Yearbook 1992) Scavenger of Souls (2000 AD Progs 850-851 & 873–880) Some Mother's Son (2000 AD Sci-Fi Special 1994) Mercy Killing (2000 AD Progs 889–891) Mercenary Attitudes (2000 AD Progs 896–899) G.I. Blues (2000 AD Progs 901–903) Blue on Blue (2000 AD Progs 928–931) Mindbombs (2000 AD Progs 937–939)	1 January 2025
192	186	Outlier	Outlier: Outlier (2000 AD Progs 1874–1883) Dark Symmetries (2000 AD Progs 1935–1944) Survivor Guilt (2000 AD Progs 1990–1999) A.H.A.B.: A.H.A.B. (2000 AD Progs 1387–1395)	15 January 2025
193	183	Skip Tracer: Volume Two	Skip Tracer: Nimrod (2000 AD Progs 2171–2180) Hyperballad (2000 AD Progs 2200-2205 & 2207–2209) Eden (2000 AD Progs 2237-2245 & 2247–2249) Valhalla (2000 AD Progs 2286–2287, 2289-2295 & 2297–2299)	29 January 2025
194	192	Night Zero	Night Zero: Night Zero (2000 AD Progs 607–616) Beyond Zero: Beyond Zero (2000 AD Progs 630–634, 645-649 & 665–666) Lost in Zero: Lost in Zero (2000 AD Annual 1991) Below Zero: Below Zero (2000 AD Progs 731–745)	12 February 2025
195	197	M.A.C.H. 1: Volume Two	M.A.C.H. 1: Everest (2000 AD Progs 34–35) M.A.C.H. Woman (2000 AD Progs 36–39) Death Ray (2000 AD Progs 40–42) M.A.C.H. Zero (2000 AD Progs 43–46) Return to Sharpe (2000 AD Prog 53) The Dolphin Tapes (2000 AD Progs 54–57) Swamp Saga (2000 AD Prog 58) Origins (2000 AD Progs 59–60) The Final Encounter (2000 AD Progs 61–64) The Mach-Man File (2000 AD Sci-Fi Special 1978) The Taxaco Venture (2000 AD Sci-Fi Special 1979) M.A.C.H. Zero Cousin George (2000 AD Progs 65–72) Cyborg Express (2000 AD Sci-Fi Special 1978) The Suit (2000 AD Progs 73–75) M.A.C.H. Zero Book 2 (2000 AD Progs 162–165)	26 February 2025
196	200	Medivac 318	Medivac 318: Medivac 318 (2000 AD Progs 619-624 & 635–640) Chemical Warfare (2000 AD Winter Special 1989) Arcturus (2000 AD Progs 683–694) Tor Cyan: World of Hurt (2000 AD Progs 1254–1256) The Dead Sorcerer's Coachman (2000 AD Prog 1263) Rahab (2000 AD Prog 1295) Phage (2000 AD Prog 1296) No Such Place (2000 AD Progs 1297–1299)	12 March 2025
197	187	Necrophim	Necrophim: Necrophim (2000 AD Progs 1628–1632) Hell's Prodigal (2000 AD Progs 1655–1665) Civil Warlord (2000 AD Progs 2011 & 1715–1723) Mechastopheles: Mechastopheles (2000 AD Progs 2045–2047) True Faith (2000 AD Progs 2092–2099) The Hunting Party (2000 AD Progs 2234–2236)	26 March 2025
198	199	The Harlem Heroes: Volume Two	The Harlem Heroes: The Harlem Heroes (Part Two) (2000 AD Progs 702–705) Death Sport (2000 AD Progs 745–749) Grey Ghost Overflight (2000 AD Progs 776–779) Cyborg Death Trip (2000 AD Progs 928–939)	9 April 2025
199	190	The Order: Volume Two	The Order: In between Days (2000 AD Prog 2182) Land of the Free (2000 AD Progs 2184–2195) Fantastic Voyage (2000 AD Progs 2262–2272) Heart of Darkness (2000 AD Progs 2317-2324 & 2326–2329)	23 April 2025
200	195	Rogue Trooper - Friday: Volume Three	Rogue Trooper: Ascent (2000 AD Progs 946–949) Angels (2000 AD Progs 950–952) Descent (2000 AD Progs 964–966) Combat Rocks (2000 AD Progs 967–970) Hot Metal (2000 AD Progs 983–986) Street Fighting Man (2000 AD Progs 987–989) Collateral (2000 AD Progs 1007–1009) Rogue Alone (2000 AD Progs 1010–1013) Rogue Troopers (2000 AD Progs 1014–1022) Shock Tactics (2000 AD Sci-Fi Special 1993) Danger Drop (2000 AD Yearbook 1995) A Night Out with the Boys (2000AD Sci-Fi Special 1995)	7 May 2025
