= The Ballad of Halo Jones =

Science fiction comic strip

Halo Jones
- Halo's first appearance, on the cover of 2000AD (July 1984)

Publication information
- Publisher: IPC Media (Fleetway) to 1999, thereafter Rebellion Developments
- First appearance: 2000 AD No. 376 (7 July 1984)
- Created by: Alan Moore (script); Ian Gibson (art)

The Ballad of Halo Jones is a science fiction comic strip written by Alan Moore and drawn by Ian Gibson, with lettering by Steve Potter (Books 1 and 2) and Richard Starkings (Book 3).

Halo Jones first appeared July 1984 in five-page instalments in the pages of the weekly British comic 2000 AD and is regarded as one of the high points of 2000 AD. The eponymous heroine is a highly sympathetic 50th-century everywoman, and the tone of the strip ranges from the comic to the poignant. The three "books" span more than ten years of her life, and also serve as a tour of the well-realised futuristic universe which Moore and Gibson created. Originally, Halo Jones was planned to run to nine books, chronicling Halo's life from adolescence to old age. However, the series was discontinued after three books due to a dispute between Moore and Fleetway, the magazine's publishers, over the intellectual property rights of the characters Moore and Gibson had co-created.

== Synopsis ==
Halo Jones 2000 AD poster, drawn by Ian Gibson.

In Book One, 18-year-old Halo Jones lives in a floating ring-shaped conurbation or housing estate called "The Hoop" that is moored in the Atlantic Ocean off the East Coast of the United States. The story takes place over one day, and follows Halo's violent though also partly comical misadventures on a shopping trip. Finally returning to her apartment, Halo finds her flatmate and best friend Brinna murdered, then discovers another good friend has become a "Different Drummer" (a youth cult perpetually numbed by the implant-generated beat of a drum in their ears). She decides to leave Earth, never to return, famously saying, "I'm going out."

Book Two depicts Halo's life as a stewardess on a year-long space voyage. Halo discovers that it was her loyal robot dog Toby, harbouring a perverse crush on Halo, who was responsible for her flatmate's death and is forced to destroy him. It is also revealed, in a framing sequence, that Halo becomes a legendary historical figure in centuries to come. During the journey she encounters a rat king, is held hostage by hijackers and meets a neutral character known as "Glyph" who has no identifying features to such a degree they are literally anonymous.

In Book Three, ten years have elapsed and Halo is a drifter with no purpose, before becoming a soldier in a Vietnam-style interstellar war which appeared as back-story in the previous two books. During her career, she leaves - only to reenlist, and makes rank of Sergeant. She is also courted by General Luiz Cannibal, one of the architects of the war. The series ends with the collapse of Earth's economy and cessation of hostilities, after which Halo commandeers a prototype starship and deserts, determined to take charge of her own fate. The ballad ends with her saying she's going "out", again.

== Locations and characters ==
- The Hoop (ghetto for "increased-leisure citizens", a euphemism for the unemployed) tethered to the Manhattan peninsula: Halo Jones, Rodice Andelia Olsun, Brinna Childresse-Lao, Ludy, Toby, Swifty Frisko, Box, Winky & The Checkout Hags, Snivelling, Rumble Jack Volunteer, Clara Pandy Engineer
- Clara Pandy (luxury space liner): Toy Molto, Glyph, Mix Ninegold, Cézanne Goleiter, Kititirik Tikrikitit, Rat King, Lux Roth Chop, Captain Slovik
- Charlemagne (planet): Yortlebluzzgubbly
- Lobis Loyo (planet): Beta Platoon (Mona Jukes, Bekti Vassar, Shahi Manish, Lyncie Welch, Ditto Wheeler, Sergeant Verna Krause, Sergeant Juno Myrmidon, Life Sentence), General Luiz Cannibal
- Moab (planet): Sergeant Wo, Private Exxon, Terran Minister For Peace Her Serenity Kikikititi Rikrikikikit
- Concordia (America, c. 6427AD): Dr. I.J. Brunhauer, Ms. Kopek, Mr. Sotgore
- Rulf's World (planet in the Vega system): It is from here that Glyph boards the Clara Pandy.
- Pwuc (planet): Halo ends up on Pwuc in the year 4960 having wandered the inner systems for almost a decade.
- Hispus (planet): The planet Halo finds herself on after signing her army release papers.

Other places she had visited or spent time in included Proxima IV, Vescue, Sirius, Skinner's World, and Popotoplec. Although it is mentioned that she met the famous historical figure Sally Quasa, this meeting does not take place in the first three books.

== Development ==
In his introductions to the three 1986 Titan editions, Moore described its genesis. The story was designed from the outset to avoid the typical 2000 AD story elements: "guns, guys and gore." Moore said that he had "no inclination to unleash yet another 'Tough Bitch with a Disintegrator and an Extra Y-Chromosome' upon the world". The idea to base the strip around an ordinary, unremarkable woman, typical of the society she lived in, was also very different for 2000 AD.

Gibson and Moore designed the world that Halo would live in with as much detail as possible. Book One may have been mildly criticised for dropping readers into a future world with no explanation of its social structure, culture, language etc., but the Introduction explains that it was designed to reveal aspects of this carefully constructed world in subtle and clever ways. In this book the creators introduce the reader to 50th-century politics, social problems, diet, cults, music, futuristic slang, fashion and also an ongoing off-world war that is clearly taking place in the background.

Moore and Gibson's collaboration paid off when the go-ahead for a second series was given. Both men were excited about where the story was heading and Book Two expanded upon what they had created before. They upped the action quotient and also created some shattering emotional scenes. Moore has said that the character of "the Glyph", introduced in Book Two, clinched the book's success (according to his comments in the introduction to the Titan Books collected edition in 1986).

=== Creator cameos ===
Both Ian Gibson and Alan Moore make a cameo appearance in the series. In Book 3, when Halo first arrives at the Glory Barge on the planet Pwuc (where she meets Toy recruiting soldiers for the Terran army), Gibson and Moore appear as two figures in the crowd – a bearded man holding a pencil and another man holding a paintbrush. Moore can also be seen being rickshawed through the rainy street on the planet Hispus after Halo has signed her release papers.

=== Book 4 and possible continuations ===
Since the publication of Book Three in 1986 fans of the series have been speculating on the possibility of Halo returning for further adventures. In his introduction to the Titan reprint of Book Three in 1986 Alan Moore seemed to be leaving an open door for Halo's story to return to the comic:

Whether this really is the last book remains to be seen. While there are currently no plans to continue the series, due to external circumstances and considerations, I think it's fair to say that, were these circumstances to alter, both Ian and myself would be only too pleased to resume The Ballad and continue to relate the history of a character to whom we've both grown very attached over the couple of years that we've worked with her. You know how it is ... We've been out with her a couple of times and the chances are that if she's free, one day we might go out with her again. Who knows? Maybe we'll let you come along too.

Moore has had very little to say about Halo's return since then. "I'd got plans to have her grow up and eventually end as an old woman," Moore told Mustard magazine in January 2006. "But I got to the point where I'd said to IPC, "Look, you know that you've ripped these characters off from us. If you were to give us the rights back, I would gladly write another three books of Halo Jones. Whereas if you don't I will never write Halo Jones and you won't get any money from the character. And they thought, 'Yeah, let's hang on to the character forever and you never get any rights to it and never write any again.' So that's where it is." A report from a 2004 BBC radio interview taping recalls that when asked to tell the audience about Halo Jones, "Moore smiled fondly as if someone had just reminded him of an ex-girlfriend who he'd never meant to split up with."

Halo painted in 2004, a possible unpublished slave storyline, drawn by Ian Gibson.

In a 2011 interview for 3:AM magazine Alan Moore stated "the next adventure would have probably been when she was a female space pirate with Sally Quasa", "I would have been basically going through all the decades of her life, with her getting older in each one, because I liked the idea, at the time, of having a strip in 2000AD with a seventy or eighty year old woman as the title character ... it would have ended up with Halo Jones upon some planet that is right at the absolute edge of the universe where, beyond that, beyond some sort of spectacular lightshow, there is no space, no time, and it would have ended up with Halo Jones – all the rest of the people on this planetoid because, actually, time is not passing; you could stay there forever, potentially – and what would have happened is that Halo Jones, after spending some time with the rest of the immortals, would have tottered across the landing field, got into her spacecraft, and flown into the psychedelic lightshow, to finally get out."

In a 2002 interview with Gavin Hanly on the2000AD Review website, Ian Gibson was asked about people's ongoing interest in the series and whether there was ever any intention to do a fourth series:

I'm very happy that Halo had such an effect. After all, that's why I asked Alan to write a girl's story. I thought it would make a difference... Alan and I had planned out Halo's future to a conclusion, but the series was interrupted by the dispute over copyright allocation, where Alan wanted to have all writers, like John Wagner et al., get their fair dues after streaming out a steady supply of genius for so many years. That's what I heard anyway – but I can't speak with authority as I wasn't involved in the negotiations. I have tried to contact Alan over the years, but with no luck. I have my own ideas of what could happen in the next couple of books that I'd have liked the chance to run past Alan, but I think he's discarded the story from his future

In another interview on the Ximoc site Gibson reiterated his desire to keep the series going. When asked about his "dream project" he says: "I'm also sure that many of Halo's fans would like me to do some more books to continue the series. Just a shame Alan doesn't want to be involved (as far as I know?)"

== Publication history ==
Year	Title ( * denotes graphic novel)	Additional info
1984	2000AD Progs 376–385	The Ballad of Halo Jones Book 1 (July–Sept, 10 episodes, 51 pages)
1985	2000AD Progs 405–415	The Ballad of Halo Jones Book 2 (Feb–April, 10 episodes & prologue, 51 pages)
1985	2000AD Sci-Fi Special	1 June, includes Halo Jones centrefold colour poster by Ian Gibson
1986	2000AD Progs 451–466	The Ballad of Halo Jones Book 3 (Jan–April, 15 episodes & prologue, 80 pages)
1986	The Ballad of Halo Jones Book 1*	Titan Books, incl introduction by Alan Moore/sketches by Ian Gibson
1986	The Ballad of Halo Jones Book 2*	Titan Books, incl introduction by Alan Moore/sketches by Ian Gibson
1986	The Ballad of Halo Jones Book 3*	Titan Books, incl introduction by Alan Moore/sketches by Ian Gibson
1986	2000AD Prog 500	'Thargshead Revisited' (13 Dec, page by Ian Gibson features Halo, Rodice & Toy)
1987	Halo Jones – Quality Comics	Colourised US reprints covering all 3 books, 12 monthly issues from Sept '87-Aug '88
1988	2000AD Sci-Fi Special	1 June, incl 4-page article on Halo Jones stage tour by in the Red company
1989	The Best of 2000AD Issue 40	January, Book 1 reprinted
1989	The Best of 2000AD Issue 42	March, Book 2 reprinted
1991	The Best of 2000AD Issue 65	February, Book 3 prologue and episodes 1–3 reprinted
1991	The Best of 2000AD Issue 66	March, Book 3 episodes 4–15 reprinted. Incl unique Ian Gibson cover art
1991	2000AD Prog 725	6 April, Halo Jones Megascan, free poster magazine, new Ian Gibson Halo artwork
1991	The Complete Ballad of Halo Jones*	Titan Books, incl excerpts from previous three Moore introductions
1996	2000AD Prog 1016	5 November, incl Halo Jones Fine Art Print, art by Robert McCallum & Jim Murray
2000	2000AD 'Prog 2001'	Annual edition, 13 December, with new Ian Gibson Halo artwork
2001	The Complete Ballad of Halo Jones*	Titan Books, including a new introduction by Ian Gibson
2002	2000AD Prog 1280	22 February, Halo featured in story celebrating 25 years of 2000AD
2003	The Complete Ballad of Halo Jones*	Titan Books, deluxe hardback edition
2005	The Ballad of Halo Jones*	Rebellion
2006	The Ballad of Halo Jones*	Rebellion, 2nd printing, new cover design and chapter headings
2007	2000AD Prog 1550	15 August, 'Halo Jones Goes To War' – Ian Gibson art poster
2013	The Ballad of Halo Jones*	Rebellion, cover art Simon Parr, introduction by Lauren Beukes, Alan Moore script pages
2017	The Ballad of Halo Jones*	2000AD: The Ultimate Collection #46 (partwork), introduction by Matt Smith, essay by Stephen Jewell
2018	The Ballad of Halo Jones – Volume 1*	Rebellion, Ian Gibson's artwork colourised by Barbara Nosenzo (May 2018)
2018	The Ballad of Halo Jones – Volume 2*	Rebellion, Ian Gibson's artwork colourised by Barbara Nosenzo (July 2018)
2018	The Ballad of Halo Jones – Volume 3*	Rebellion, Ian Gibson's artwork colourised by Barbara Nosenzo (September 2018)
2021	The Ballad of Halo Jones: The Complete Edition – Audiobook	Penguin Audio, unabridged, 3hrs 3 mins (March 2021)
2023	The Ballad of Halo Jones – Full Colour Omnibus Edition*	Rebellion, Ian Gibson's artwork colourised by Barbara Nosenzo, hardback, also limited slipcase edition (January 2023)

=== Other appearances ===
Detail of 2000 AD Prog 500 Cover, drawn by Ian Gibson.

The last occasion that Moore and Gibson collaborated on a Halo piece was for the 500th edition of 2000 AD in December 1986. A portrait of Halo is featured on this special issue's glossy cover. Inside many 2000 AD artists had fun with their own creations. In the strip "Thargshead Revisited" the editor of the comic (the alien Tharg) takes a journey through his own head and encounters many characters from 2000 AD's past. The page drawn by Ian Gibson features Halo, Rodice and Toy involved in a game of strip poker with Sam Slade (with the head of Luiz Cannibal on a plate on the table). This was the last time that Moore wrote dialogue for these characters.

Prog 2000 featured Halo beating Hap Hazzard and Finn before getting blown away by the Missionary Man in that issue's character Deathmatch.

"Helter Skelter", a Judge Dredd story written by Garth Ennis (12 episodes Progs 1250–1261) features cameos from a myriad of previous 2000AD characters including Halo Jones in episodes 6 & 7. Artwork by Carlos Ezquerra and Henry Flint.

Jones has since appeared on one page of the 20th anniversary strip 'A Night 2 Remember' (Prog 1280), written by Robbie Morrison and illustrated by Gibson.

== Reprinting ==
In December 2000 a special 2000 AD issue (titled 'Prog 2001') was released featuring another full colour portrait of Halo. Titan were planning a reissue of the Complete Ballad of Halo Jones in July 2001 and this portrait was used as the cover art. The first collected edition had been published by Titan in September 1991. This time the introduction to the book was written by Ian Gibson. 2000AD hyped up the release on its site: "Alan Moore's hugely acclaimed saga of one woman's quest for reason in a galaxy gone mad. Out of print now for nearly a decade, fans have been clamouring for this collection anew, especially with the success of Moore's ABC line. This classic tale, lovingly rendered by artist Ian Gibson, is now available again in its epic entirety".

The back cover of the book similarly heralded the return of a comic legend: "Meet Halo Jones. She's going out...and out...and out! Escaping the Hoop, Manhattan Island's land of mindless leisure, is just the first step in a cosmic adventure that will take Halo to the far ends of the galaxy, through war and peace, trial, despair and triumph. You've never met anyone quite like Halo...and you never will again."

"Possibly the first feminist heroine in comics", wrote The Observer of Alan Moore's epic tale of one woman's search for her place in a galaxy out of control. "Originally published in 2000 AD and then collected by Titan Books, this classic tale of future alienation and an individual's struggle remains a timeless testament to the genius of Moore. Beautifully illustrated by artist Ian Gibson, this is the ultimate sci-fi opus. Don't dare miss it!"

US reviewers also welcomed the book's return: "Criminally out of print for the last few years. Halo Jones is one of the finest graphic novels ever created – if you've never given them a go, shame on you – but this is the perfect place to start if men in tights superhero stuff puts you off. Halo Jones has it all – a fantastic storyline, cinematic graphics and characters that knock dead most of the ciphers you find in contemporary fiction."

The Complete Ballad of Halo Jones was voted the third best book of 2001 by the readers of Dreamwatch magazine.

The whole trilogy was reprinted in 2000 AD: The Ultimate Collection in September 2017.

=== US Quality Comics ===
Cover of Quality Comics Halo Jones Issue No. 6.

A year after the end of the publication on the pages of 2000 AD, The Ballad of Halo Jones was reprinted in the United States by Quality Comics. Publisher's Bob Keenan and Sal Quartuccio had secured the rights to reissue colourised versions of 2000 AD characters Judge Dredd, Rogue Trooper, Strontium Dog, Sam Slade and Halo Jones. New covers were commissioned for these comics by artists such as Bill Mayer, Bart Sears and Jim Fern. Eva Brozowski served as the colourist for the covers (her initials can be seen separately to the artist's). To fit the square 2000 AD pages to American comic book format, Quality attached a distorting lens to a photocopy machine, elongating and "effectively destroying the art in the process" according to one reviewer.

As well as the main story these reprints also include some Gibson work from 2000 ADs vaults such as "The Amazing Maze Dumoir", and "You Win Some You Lose Some" (both scripted by Alan Hebden). Also featured during this run were episodes of Anderson Psi Division, Ro-busters, Sooner or Later, Dash Decent and Alan Moore's Abelard Snazz and his Future Shocks story "Sunburn".

== In popular culture ==
Halo Jones has been mentioned in popular culture:

The UK band Halo James was named after the eponymous character.

The debut album Pop Art by 1980s group Transvision Vamp features a track entitled "Hanging out with Halo Jones".

The Shriekback song "Malaria" includes the line "I wanna live with Halo Jones".

== Merchandise and adaptations ==
A stage adaptation of The Ballad of Halo Jones was a surprise hit at the 1987 Edinburgh Festival. In 1988 the Red Theatre Company toured the show around the UK.

Another stage adaptation: In 2001, Book One of the story appeared as a play in Liverpool.

In 2012, a new stage adaptation covering Book One and Book Two of the series was performed as a fringe theatre production in Manchester. Leah Moore attended one of the performances.

Halo Jones T-shirts issued by 2000 AD in the 1980s had the slogan "Hoop-life Hero" on them.

In the 1980s, a computer game was developed for the Spectrum and Amstrad computers, based around the shopping trip that Halo takes. It was unreleased due to the Piranha Software being closed down by its parent company.

A Full-Cast audioplay adaptation was released in 2021 by Penguin Audio featuring Sheila Atim as Halo Jones.

== See also ==
- List of feminist comic books
- Portrayal of women in comics
