= Ian Gibson (comics) =

British comic book artist (1946–2023)

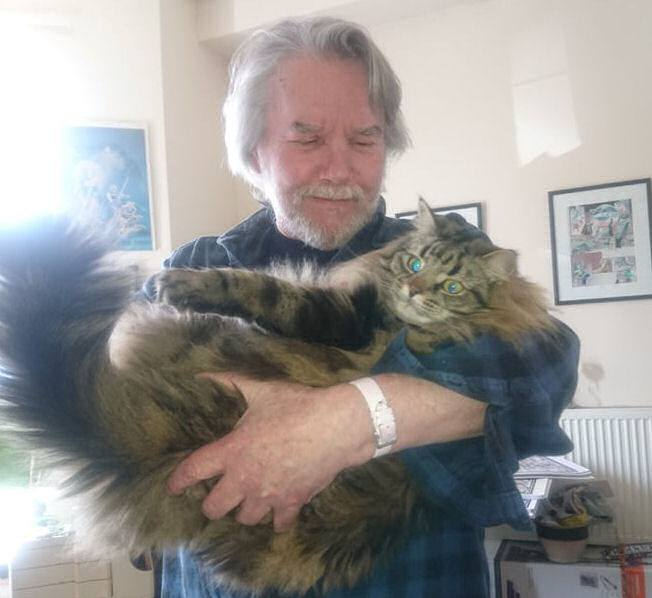
- Gibson in 2019, at home with his cat "Floofy"
- Born: 20 February 1946
- Died: 11 December 2023 (aged 77)
- Areas: Penciller, Inker, Colourist
- Notable works: Robo-Hunter; The Ballad of Halo Jones; Judge Dredd
- Collaborators: John Wagner/Alan Grant; Alan Moore

Ian Gibson (20 February 1946 – 11 December 2023) was a British comic book artist, best known for his 1980s black-and-white work for 2000 AD, especially as the main artist on Robo-Hunter and The Ballad of Halo Jones, as well as his long run on Judge Dredd.

== Biography ==
Gibson's imaginative cartoonish, and intricately detailed style (especially in black and white strips) lent itself well to humorous strips, such as Robo-Hunter, although his work on the Alan Moore-penned The Ballad of Halo Jones showed that he was capable of telling a serious story.

Gibson's first published work in the United States appeared in Green Lantern Corps #214–216 (July–Sept. 1987) which were written by Steve Englehart. He collaborated with Englehart again a short time later on the Millennium limited series in January and February 1988. In a 2022 interview, Gibson called the series "stupid shit". Gibson made a good name for himself drawing Mister Miracle for DC Comics in 1989 and 1990. Subsequently he started work on Meta 4, a science fiction/superhero comic written by Stefan Petrucha. This series was cut short when publisher First Comics went out of business. He also worked on several Star Wars titles for Dark Horse Comics.

Gibson's later work in the comic 2000AD consisted of drawing Judge Dredd, Anderson, Psi-Division, I Was a Teenage Tax Consultant, and the revived Robo-Hunter series starring Sam Slade's granddaughter, Samantha. His last published original material for that comic appeared in prog 1576 (March 2008).

In 2023, he finally published the first issue of Lifeboat, which he wrote and illustrated himself, through a crowd-funded project.

He contributed articles and rants to the Den of Geek website about the state of the comics industry.

Gibson died from cancer on 11 December 2023, at the age of 77.

== Bibliography ==
Comics work included:

- Judge Dredd:
  - "Robot Wars" (with John Wagner, in 2000 AD #14, 17, May–June 1977)
  - "Mr Buzzz" (with John Wagner, in 2000 AD #22, July 1977)
  - "You Bet Your Life" (with John Wagner, in 2000 AD #25, August 1977)
  - "The Academy of Law" (with John Wagner, in 2000 AD #27, August 1977)
  - "The Neon Knights" (with Pat Mills, in 2000 AD #29, September 1977)
  - "Devil's Island" (with Gerry Finley-Day, in 2000 AD #31, September 1977)
  - "Walter's Secret Job" (with John Wagner, in 2000 AD #33, October 1977)
  - "Mutie the Pig" (with John Wagner, in 2000 AD #35, October 1977)
  - "The Troggies" (with John Wagner, in 2000 AD #36, October 1977)
  - "Billy Jones" (with John Wagner, in 2000 AD #38, November 1977)
  - "Luna 1" (with John Wagner, in 2000 AD #42, December 1977)
  - "22nd Century Futzie" (with John Wagner, in 2000 AD #45, December 1977)
  - "Meet Mr Moonie" (with John Wagner, in 2000 AD #46, January 1978)
  - "The Oxygen Desert" (with John Wagner, in 2000 AD #48-49, January 1978)
  - "The Killer Car" (with John Wagner, in 2000 AD #53-56, February–March 1978)
  - "Vienna" (with John Wagner, in 2000 AD #116, June 1979)
  - "The Nightmare Gun" (with John Wagner/Alan Grant, in 2000 AD #190, December 1980)
  - "Synthi-Caff Vindilu" (with John Wagner/Alan Grant, in 2000 AD #191, December 1980)
  - "Knock on the Door" (with John Wagner/Alan Grant, in 2000 AD #195, January 1981)
  - "Any Confessions" (with John Wagner/Alan Grant, in 2000 AD #201, 1981)
  - "The Alien Way" (with John Wagner/Alan Grant, in 2000 AD #204, 1981)
  - "The Problem With Sonny Bono" (with John Wagner/Alan Grant, in 2000 AD #208, 1981)
  - "The Umpty Baggers" (with John Wagner/Alan Grant, in 2000 AD #213-214, 1981)
  - "The Stookie Glanders" (with John Wagner/Alan Grant, in 2000 AD #220-221, 1981)
  - "Rumble in the Jungle" (with John Wagner/Alan Grant, in 2000 AD #343-345, 1983)
  - "Are You Tired of Being Mugged?" (with John Wagner/Alan Grant, in 2000 AD #354, 1984)
  - "Bob's Law" (with John Wagner/Alan Grant, in 2000 AD #355, 1984)
  - "High Society" (with John Wagner/Alan Grant, in 2000 AD #364, 1984)
  - "The House on Runner's Walk" (with John Wagner/Alan Grant, in 2000 AD #365, 1984)
  - "City of the Damned" (with John Wagner/Alan Grant, in 2000 AD #400-401, 1985)
  - "Hagatha Smeld" (with John Wagner/Alan Grant, in 2000 AD #419, 1985)
  - "Aftermath Ron Reagan" (with John Wagner/Alan Grant, in 2000 AD #420, 1985)
  - "Love Story" (with John Wagner/Alan Grant, in 2000 AD #444, 1985)
  - "It Pays to be Mental" (with John Wagner/Alan Grant, in 2000 AD #468, 1986)
  - "Rumours Can Kill" (with John Wagner/Alan Grant, in 2000 AD #469, 1986)
  - "Paid With Thanks" (with John Wagner/Alan Grant, in 2000 AD #476, 1986)
  - "Tomb of the Judges" (with John Wagner/Alan Grant, in 2000 AD #496-498, 1986)
  - "What If Judges Did Ads?" (with John Wagner/Alan Grant, in 2000 AD #521, 1987)
  - "Full Mental Jacket" (with John Wagner, in 2000 AD #578-580, June 1988)
  - "Almighty Dredd" (with Garth Ennis, in 2000 AD #780-782, April–May 1992)
  - "Giant" (with John Wagner, in Judge Dredd Megazine vol. 2 #50-52, April 1994)
  - "Judge Death: The True Story" (with John Wagner, in 2000 AD #901-902, August 1994)
  - "Bum Rap" (with John Wagner, in 2000 AD #1070, November 1997)
  - "A Day in the Death of Joe Meg" (with John Wagner, in 2000 AD #1223, January 2001)
  - "Sex Beast!" (with John Wagner, in 2000 AD #1230, February 2001)
  - "Lost in Cyberspace" (with John Wagner, in 2000 AD #1268-1270, November 2001)
  - "Terrorist!" (with Alan Grant, in 2000 AD #1274, January 2002)
  - "Love Story III: The End of the Affair" (with John Wagner, in 2000 AD #1281, March 2002)
  - "Give Me Liberty" (with Gordon Rennie, in 2000 AD #1304-1305, August 2002)
  - "After Hours" (with Gordon Rennie, in 2000 AD #1319, November 2002)
  - "Sniping" (with John Wagner, in 2000 AD #1321, December 2002)
  - "The Marriage Game" (with John Wagner, in Judge Dredd Megazine #203, March 2003)
  - "Holding On" (with Gordon Rennie, in 2000 AD #1357, September 2003)
  - "At Home With the Snozzburns" (with Alan Grant, in 2000 AD #1391, May 2004)
  - "Missing in Action" (with Gordon Rennie, in 2000 AD #1429-1431, March 2005)
  - "Global Psycho" (with Gordon Rennie, in 2000 AD #1468, December 2005)
  - "Return to Planet Gary" (with Gordon Rennie, in 2000 AD #1483, April 2006)
  - "Judgement" (with Gordon Rennie, in 2000 AD #1523-1528, February–March 2007)
  - "Nuked!" (with Robbie Morrison, in 2000 AD #1576, March 2008)
- Walter the Wobot (with Joe Collins):
  - "Tap Dancer" (in 2000 AD #50, February 1978)
  - "Shoot Pool!" (in 2000 AD #51, February 1978)
- Robo-Hunter:
  - "Verdus" (with John Wagner, in 2000 AD #76-85 & 100-112, August 1978 – May 1979)
  - "Day of the Droids" (with John Wagner, in 2000 AD #152-174, 1980)
  - "The Beast of Blackheart Manor " (with Alan Grant, in 2000 AD #259-265, 1982)
  - "The Filby Case " (with Alan Grant, in 2000 AD #266-272, 1982)
  - "Killing of Kidd" (with Alan Grant, in 2000 AD #275-281, 283-88, 1982)
  - "Football Crazy" (with John Wagner/Alan Grant, in 2000 AD #283-288, 1983)
  - "Play it again, Sam" (with John Wagner/Alan Grant, in 2000 AD #292-307, 1982–1983)
  - "The Slaying of Slade" (with John Wagner/Alan Grant, in 2000 AD #312-330, 1983)
  - "Sam Slade's Last Case" (with John Wagner/Alan Grant, in 2000 AD #331-334, 1983)
  - "Hoagy's First Case" (with Alan Grant, in 2000 AD 1984 Annual, 1983)
  - "Farewell, My Billions" (with John Wagner, in 2000 AD #435-443, 1985)
- Project Overkill (with Kelvin Gosnell, in 2000 AD #119-126, 1979)
- The Mind of Wolfie Smith: "The Evil of Matthew Hobb" (with Tom Tully, in 2000 AD #127-130, 1979)
- Ro-Jaws' Robo-Tales: "Miracle in Slum Alley" (with Gary Rice, in 2000 AD #188, 1980)
- Tharg the Mighty (with Tharg the Mighty):
  - "Revenge of the Thrill Suckers" (in 2000 AD #198-199, February 1981)
  - "The Day They Banned 2000 AD!" (in 2000 AD #208-209, April 1981)
  - "The Nightmare" (in 2000 AD #222-223, July–August 1981)
  - "Leave it to, um...Burt" (in 2000 AD Annual 1983, 1982)
  - "Tharg's Head Revisited" (with various artists, in 2000 AD #500, December 1986)
  - "A Night 2 Remember" (with various writers and artists, in 2000 AD #1280, February 2002)
- Tharg's Future Shocks:
  - "Grawks Bearing Gifts" (with Alan Moore, in 2000 AD #203, March 1981)
  - "You Win Some, You Lose Some" (with Alan Hebden, in 2000 AD #374, June 1984)
- Ace Trucking Co.: "Hell's Pocket" (with John Wagner/Alan Grant, in 2000 AD #239-243, 1981)
- The Amazing Maze Dumoir (with Alan Hebden, in 2000 AD #368-369, May 1984)
- The Domino Theory (with M. Feekins, in 2000 AD #371, June 1984)
- Anderson: Psi Division:
  - "The Mind of Edward Bottlebum" (with John Wagner/Alan Grant, in Judge Dredd Annual 1985, 1984)
  - "A Fistful of Denimite" (with Alan Grant, in Judge Dredd Annual 1986, 1985)
  - "Colin Wilson Block" (with Alan Grant, in 2000 AD Winter Special 1988, 1988)
- The Ballad of Halo Jones (with Alan Moore, collected in The Complete Halo Jones, Titan Books, softcover, October 1991, ISBN 1-85286-374-9, July 2001, ISBN 1-84023-342-7, hardcover, November 2003, ISBN 1-84023-772-4, Rebellion Developments, softcover, June 2005, ISBN 1-904265-41-3, January 2007, ISBN 1-905437-18-8):
  - "Ballad of Halo Jones: Book 1" (in 2000AD #376-385, 1984)
  - "Ballad of Halo Jones: Book 2 Prologue" (in 2000AD #405, 1985)
  - "Ballad of Halo Jones: Book 2" (in 2000AD #406-415, 1985)
  - "Ballad of Halo Jones: Book 3 Prologue" (in 2000AD #451, 1986)
  - "Ballad of Halo Jones: Book 3" (in 2000AD #452-466, 1986)
- Green Lantern Corps #214–216 (with Steve Englehart, ongoing series, DC Comics, July–September 1987)
- Millennium (inker, with writer Steve Englehart and penciler Joe Staton, eight-issue limited series, DC Comics, January–February 1988)
- Mister Miracle #1–5, 20 (with J. M. DeMatteis (1–5) and Keith Giffen/Doug Moench (20), ongoing series, DC Comics, January–June 1989, October 1990)
- The Chronicles of Genghis Grimtoad (with John Wagner/Alan Grant, in Strip #1–20, Marvel UK, February 1990 – November 1990, tpb, September 1990, ISBN 1-85400-222-8)
- Steed and Mrs. Peel (three-issue limited series, Eclipse Comics, December 1990 – February 1991):
  - "The Golden Game" (with Grant Morrison, in Steed and Mrs. Peel #1–3)
  - "Deadly Rainbow" (with Anne Caulfield, in Steed and Mrs. Peel #2–3)
- Meta-4 #1–3 (with Stefan Petrucha, ongoing series, First Comics, February–April 1991)
- Return of the Taxidermist (with John Wagner, in Judge Dredd Megazine vol. 2 #37–46, September 1993 – February 1994)
- Star Wars: Droids #3, 5 (with Dan Thorsland, six-issue limited series, Dark Horse Comics, June, August 1994)
- Star Wars: Droids #1–4: "Rebellion" (with Ryder Windham, eight-issue limited series, Dark Horse Comics, April–July 1995)
- I Was a Teenage Tax Consultant (with John Wagner, in 2000 AD #1050-1059, 1997)
- "Brick Tears" (with Jim Krueger, in The Foot Soldiers #3, five-issue limited series, Image Comics, January 1998)
- Star Wars: Boba Fett - Enemy of the Empire #1–3 (with John Wagner, four-issue limited series, Dark Horse Comics, January–March 1999, tpb, 112 pages, 1999, ISBN 1-56971-407-X)
- "All's Swell That Ends Swell" (pencils, with writer John Ostrander, in X-Men Unlimited #32, Marvel Comics, September 2001)
- Banzai Battalion (with John Wagner, collected in Judge Dredd: Banzai Battalion, Rebellion, December 2003, ISBN 1-904265-11-1):
  - "The Fitz" (in 2000 AD #1257-1262, August–October 2001)
  - "Save the Fitz!" (in 2000 AD Prog 2003, December 2002)
- Samantha Slade Robo-Hunter (with Alan Grant):
  - "Like A Virgin" (in 2000 AD Prog 2004, #1371-1373, December 2003 – January 2004)
  - "The Furzt Case" (in 2000 AD Prog 2004, #1406–1411, September–October 2004)
  - "The Davinchy Code" (in 2000 AD Prog 2005, December 2004)
  - "Stim!" (in 2000 AD from #1450-1456, August–September 2005)
  - "Casino Royal" (in 2000 AD from #1527-1531, March–April 2007)
  - "I, Jailbird" (in 2000 AD from #1545-1546, July 2007)

== Controversy ==
In 2013, Gibson offered a selection of his artwork to Bristol Comic Expo. They were to choose a single piece to be made into a limited edition print of only 50 copies, which were intended to raise money for charity. In the collection was a topless illustration of a character that bore a resemblance to feminist character Halo Jones, one of Gibson's more notable characters. Gibson says it was drawn "as a joke for a friend" and that he only named the piece after Halo Jones to give it some appeal to potential buyers, saying "it doesn't even really look very much like Halo" and "I just called it 'topless Halo' as otherwise it was just a nameless pinup". The print in question shows the character that is meant to be Halo Jones topless with the moonlight shining down on her posing next to a single tree in the background. It was reported by The Guardian that the Expo website described the piece as "a special, very limited run of Halo in all her 'glory'!", for "the discerning adult. This is an opportunity not to be missed!"

It was reported by The Guardian to have "provoked a wave of protests", with complaints from comic fans and industry professionals. Rebellion Developments Ltd. The publisher of the 2000AD comic series, was said to have expressed concerns about the portrayal of their intellectual property, Halo Jones. The image was taken down from the Expo's website soon after.

Gibson said he found it "ironic that Halo would be known as a 'feminist' character", and that he had been "attacked in the past for 'using' her and thus all women for my own nefarious ends", and how the bare-breasted image of the female heroine was keeping in line with "the ideas I had for any continuation of the saga". He went on to say "I had plans for her being pregnant – hence the bigger boobs. Also as a slave, hence the token chains and nakedness." Gibson described the controversy as "a storm in a D-cup", a pun based on the idiom "storm in a teacup" and referring to a woman's bra size.
