= Age of the Wolf =

- Cover to the collected edition of Age of the Wolf; Art by Jon Davis-Hunt

Publication information
- Publisher: Rebellion Developments
- First appearance: 2000 AD #1700 (2010)
- Created by: Alec Worley; Jon Davis-Hunt

Age of the Wolf is a post-apocalyptic adventure series published in the British comics anthology 2000 AD. It was created by Alec Worley and Jon Davis-Hunt and first appeared in #1700 in 2010.

In the series, the ancient Norse prophecy of Ragnarök brings about a moonlit cataclysm in which most of humanity become werewolves. The plot charts the life of one of the few surviving humans, a dog pound worker called Rowan Morrigan who becomes a deadly werewolf hunter.

The series is a trilogy. The second and third entries shift the story forward years at a time. In the final part, 35 years have passed since the beginning and Rowan is a mother in her mid-fifties.

== Creation and concept ==
The series was originally conceived as a trilogy following a progression derived from the Three Fates of Norse mythology in which the heroine is first a type of sacrificial maiden, second a “Sarah Conner-type mother” and, finally, a monster. Worley envisioned the third part as a “reverse-Beowulf” in which Rowan, formerly the protagonist, would be the antagonist to a werewolf warrior. It was feared the third part would over-complicate the story so the original idea was abandoned. Worley adapted his original plan for the third part into a different vision of a world now adapted to long-term moonlight, with “a far-out pulp sci-fi feel, like something off a prog rock album, a Rodney Matthews poster or an '80s fantasy epic like The Dark Crystal, all funky vegetation, and alien creatures running around looking awesome.”

== Publication history ==
- Age of the Wolf, in 2000 AD #1700-08, Sept. 2010.
- Age of the Wolf: She Is Legend, in 2000 AD #1772-81, Feb. 2012.
- Age of the World: Wolfworld, in 2000 AD #1840-49, Jul. 2013

=== Collected edition ===
- Age of the Wolf (Oct. 2014) Oxford: Rebellion (ISBN 9781781082638)
