= Abelard Snazz =

Fictional character in the comic 2000 AD

Abelard Snazz.

Abelard Snazz was a fictional comics character, created by Alan Moore, and first illustrated by artist Steve Dillon. A super intelligent man, nicknamed "The Man With The Multi-Storey Mind", he appeared on the pages of British magazine 2000 AD.

== Publication history ==
Abelard Snazz, also known as "the man with the two/multi-storey brain", is a genius whose plans nevertheless do not work quite as intended. His first name was likely inspired by Moore's half-memory of having read about the philosopher Peter Abelard, but no specific link was implied. Snazz was Alan Moore's first recurring character for 2000 AD, and appeared in eight issues between 1980 and 1983. Snazz first appeared in Moore's third Ro-Jaws' Robo Tales strip for 2000 AD (and third work overall for that publication), in the two-part story "The Final Solution", in issues #189-190. Moving briefly into the Tharg's Future Shocks for his second storyline (third appearance) in #209, Snazz then gained his own short-lived strip in #237. 'The Man with the Double-Decker Brain' is a mutant with two brains and two sets of eyes (occasionally adorned by two sets of glasses). Convinced - with some accuracy - of his own genius, he acted as a consultant inventor, "offering to handle complex problems with even more complicated solutions," and shared many character traits that Moore would return to with the America's Best Comics character Jack B. Quick in his Tomorrow Stories anthology comic, two decades later.

Typically his innovative solutions build upon one another to great comic effect as his initial errors are compounded in ever-more bizarre ways. Joe McCulloch describes the logical progression of two of the strips in the following way:

Upon inventing ultra-sophisticated police robots to rid crime, Snazz winds up reducing a planet to a police state, so he invents complementary robot criminals, but then innocent citizens are getting caught in the crossfire, so he invents robot civilians to be harmlessly wasted, and eventually the robots crowd the humans off the planet. In another scenario, he creates a Virtue-Converter to transmute the unlimited selflessness of the beatific Farbian Crottle-Worms into a lucrative source of energy, at least until his callous attitude toward his beaming work-force engenders Pride within them, counteracting their virtue and spoiling the plan.

Snazz is regularly accompanied by his robot sidekick Edwin, whose dialogue tends to revolve around variations on the phrase "You're a genius, Master!", serving to stroke the ego of Snazz spurring him to ever more unlikely feats of "intelligence", while also underscoring the humour for the reader. Eventually, Snazz himself is frustrated by Edwin's cloying, servile flattery. Five of the six Abelard Snazz stories end with characters turning against Snazz and leaving him in a cliffhanger-style predicament.

The Abelard Snazz saga pales in significance when compared to Moore's better-known 2000 AD work - Skizz, D.R. & Quinch, and The Ballad of Halo Jones - but, despite its relative lack of exposure (and page count), it formed a cohesive whole, with "a fairly tight continuity, with earlier adventures referenced later on, and even an ending of sorts."

== Bibliography ==
=== Original run ===
The character of Abelard Snazz appeared in three issues (two short strips) before getting his own eponymous strip, which ran for a further five issues (four complete storylines). All six stories were written by Alan Moore:

- Ro-Jaws' Robo Tales: "Final Solution" (art by Steve Dillon, in 2000 AD #189-190, 1980)
- Tharg's Future Shocks: "The Return of the Two-Storey Brain!" (art by Mike White, in 2000 AD #209, 1981)
- Abelard Snazz:
  - "The Double-Decker Dome Strikes Back" (art by Mike White, in 2000 A.D. #237-238, 1981)
  - "Halfway to Paradise" (art by John Cooper, in 2000 AD #245, 1982)
  - "The Multi-Storey Mind Mellows Out!" (art by Paul Neary, in 2000 AD #254, 1982)
  - "Genius is Pain" (art by Mike White, in 2000 AD #299, 1983)

=== Reprints ===
The first two Abelard Snazz stories were reprinted in Eagle/Quality's 1986 2000 AD vol. 2 reprint comics. "Final Solution" featured in issue 4, and issue 5 reprinted "The Return of the Two-Storey Brain".

- 2000 A.D. vol. 2 #4 (Eagle, July 1986)
- 2000 A.D. vol. 2 #5 (Quality, August 1986)

Moore's short Future Shocks stories were collected in the late 1980s and reprinted in two volumes by Titan Books as Shocking Futures (1986) and Twisted Times (1987). All bar one of the Abelard Snazz strips feature in the second of the two volumes, because as Moore explains in the introduction to "Twisted Times", "The Return of the Two-Storey Brain" did not, due to "unintentional plagiarism" on his part from a story by R. A. Lafferty.

- Twisted Times (Titan, 1987, ISBN 0-907610-72-2)

This story was nonetheless restored when Rebellion published all six Abelard Snazz stories, alongside Moore's other "Future Shocks" in the 2006 trade paperback:

- The Complete Future Shocks (Rebellion, 2006, ISBN 1-904265-88-X)

== Synopses ==
=== "Final Solution" ===
On the planet Twopp, crime is so rampant that even the Prime Minister, Chancellor, and Commissioner are robbed down to their underwear on their way to visit double-brained, four-eyed “Mutant Supermind” Abelard Snazz, President of Think, Inc. The officials of Twopp ask Snazz for a solution to the planet's crime problem. Snazz's answer is to create a race of giant police robots, heavily armed and programmed to make unlimited arrests. Snazz is hailed as a genius by his sycophantic robot assistant, Edwin. Unfortunately, the police robots are so efficient that they arrest all of the criminals on the planet, and continue to fill out their arrest quotient by arresting citizens for minor offences, such as breaking the laws of etiquette, good taste, and grammar. With everybody getting arrested, the officials return to Snazz for help. Snazz creates a race of giant criminal robots to keep the robot police busy, thus saving innocent people from being arrested. However, the perfectly matched conflict between the robot police and robot criminals creates an all-out war which kills scores of innocent bystanders. After another visit from the officials, Snazz's latest solution is to create a race of little robot innocent bystanders to suffer in the humans’ stead. This saves the people from harm, but it also leaves the planet Twopp overcrowded with robots. The humans abandon the planet, and when Snazz announces his idea of building a giant robot planet for them, the enraged officials have had enough and eject Snazz and Edwin into outer space.

=== "The Return of the Two-Storey Brain!" ===
Abelard Snazz and Edwin are rescued from deep space by a passing cruiser piloted by Hoolio Moolabar, who is despondent because he has lost his life savings on the casino world of Beteldryve. Snazz believes his genius can help Mollabar recoup his losses, and hits upon the idea of creating a time machine to make Hoolio and himself rich. After returning to Beteldryve, Snazz uses his "Time Box" to repeatedly place bets on games he already knows the outcome of. Snazz and Hoolio soon become the richest people in the galaxy, but Snazz subsequently loses all of their money by losing two-hundred coin-tosses against a doorman who, unbeknownst to Snazz, has been using an “Acme Probability Scrambler.” Edwin was unavailable to assist Snazz as he was busy getting drunk with some robot dancers. An enraged Hoolio refuses to let Snazz use the Time Box to win back their money, and instead uses it to send Snazz and Edwin back in time to when they were trapped in space. This time, when Hoolio's cruiser passes them, it doesn't stop to pick them up. This story is missing from most reprints due to Moore's "unintentional plagiarism" from a story by R. A. Lafferty.

=== "The Double-Decker Dome Strikes Back" ===
Adrift in deep space with a rapidly diminishing oxygen supply, Abelard Snazz is cryogenically preserved after a passing meteor ruptures his space suit's thermostat and freezes his body. Two thousand years later, a passing race of morose, Viking-like beings, the Farbians, rescue Snazz and bring him and the corroded remains of Edwin aboard their ship. After Snazz is defrosted and gets his bearings, he gleefully disposes of Edwin's remains via the ship's garbage disposal chute. The Farbians take Snazz back to their home planet, Farbus. The Farbians believe that Snazz is a god-like being, the “Toglub of the Two-Fold Gaze,” and worship him accordingly. They also inform Snazz that he is the fulfillment of a prophecy – that the Toglub has been sent to deliver Farbus from three major calamities: their economic crisis, caused by the “Farbian Crottle” weed killing all their vegetation; their energy crisis, caused by a lack of fuel; and the crisis of a black hole’s imminent approach to the planet. Snazz is duly informed that, should the Toglub fail to solve these three problems in a single stroke, he will be thrown to the Piranha-Dogs. After much thought, Snazz discovers that the Farbian Crottle is overrun and fed on by the intelligent “Farbian Crottle-Worms” – “the most saintly and good-natured beings in known space.” Snazz creates a “virtue converter” to transform the worms’ good thoughts into an unlimited supply of energy – thus solving the energy crisis. Snazz theorises that other races will want to harness this source of energy, and the Farbians can sell abundant supplies of Farbian Crottle to them – thus solving the economic crisis. As for the black hole, Snazz comes up with the idea of stitching up the hole with a thread-like stream of “cohesive neutrinos” from a faster-than-light spaceship, piloted by himself and powered by Farbian Crottle-Worms. This plan initially works, until the Farbians praise the worms. An enraged Snazz declares that all the thanks should go to him, and that the worms are merely a bunch of “do-gooder maggots” and “mindless invertebrates.” The worms are so insulted that they lose their good thoughts, and thus the ship loses power – and is sucked into the black hole.

=== "Halfway to Paradise" ===
Abelard Snazz ends up in an immigration-authority queue where people who have fallen into black holes are processed. When Snazz informs the official that his previous occupation was being employed by the people of Farbus as the “Great God Toglub,” he is dispatched to the “Bide-a-Wee-Twilight Dimension for Disinherited Deities.” There, Snazz encounters a collection of ancient gods (mostly from Greek mythology) who have lost their power because no one believes in them anymore. Snazz appoints himself the gods’ new manager, and begins a massive promotional campaign to rebrand the gods and bring them up to date, making himself rich in the process. Snazz brings the “Gods Revival’” to Ursa Minor, where he introduces to the inhabitants the gods’ new roles, including Ares as the God of Space Invaders Machines, Demeter as the Goddess of Health Food Stores, Apollo as the Disco God, and Eros as the God of Popular Romantic Fiction. Unfortunately, the people worship the gods so much that they revert to human sacrifice to placate them. An appalled Snazz tries to convince the gods to put an end to it, but they inform him that creating barbarism “is what being a god is all about!” Snazz refuses to allow this, so the gods decide to banish him: Snazz is left stranded in “a realm of bleak isolation” from which he can only escape if he solves a puzzle left by Zeus - a gigantic Rubik's Cube. This is one of the few times Snazz showed any sort of moral conscience.

=== "The Multi-Storey Mind Mellows Out!" ===
Six million years later, Abelard Snazz is rescued from the Dimension of Bleak Desolation by a pair of hippies working for Amnesty Intergalactic. Snazz is rescued just before he can use a giant crane to make the final turn to solve the giant Rubik's Cube – it took Snazz twelve thousand years to mine enough metal to build the crane, and another thirty thousand years to actually build it. The hippies take Snazz back to Earth, which has enjoyed a utopian existence ever since California won World War 26. Snazz is dismayed that Earth has become such a “technological paradise” that there is nothing left for him to invent. However, he soon hits upon the idea of creating robot tennis players to replace human players. The hippies of City Hall agree that making tennis purely a spectator sport would make the game more “mellow” and more of a “communal sharing experience.” Snazz duly creates robot tennis players, gigantic enough to be seen by huge crowds. Snazz explains that the robots are highly skilled at tennis because they have been programmed with the personalities of great 20th century tennis players. Unfortunately, one of the robots has the personality of John McEnroe, and after arguing with the tennis umpire during a match, the robot loses its temper and begins to destroy the stadium. The humans run for their lives, and punish Snazz by attempting to drown him in the city's giant Jacuzzi.

=== "Genius is Pain" ===
Before he falls into the giant whirlpool bath, Abelard Snazz is teleported to the other side of the universe to face trial before the Manager of the Universe. The Manager recounts all of Snazz's misadventures up to this point, and Snazz's attempts to escape taking an older chair bound man also being judged with him.(a rare act of selflessness) Snazz attempts to escape by threatening the judge with a “Neuron-Whisk” fails. At the moment of pronouncing judgment, everyone begins singing “Happy Birthday to You” to Snazz. The Manager explains to Snazz that it was not a trial and any citizen who passes “the six million mark” is honoured with a celebration and “the one gift” that would make him “happier than anything in the world.” Snazz unwraps his “perfect gift,” but rather than empiric power or riches, Snazz is dismayed to discover that his gift is his old robot servant Edwin, who has been recovered from deep space and rebuilt. Overjoyed to see his old master, Edwin is as cloying as ever, and Snazz breaks down in tears of anguish, misinterpreted by those in the room as tears of gratitude. Snazz is left to reacquaint himself with Edwin, and elects to pummel the robot repeatedly instead. Between each knock, Edwin still proclaims Snazz to be “a genius!”
