= Robo-Hunter =

- 2000AD Prog 259 cover, art by Ian Gibson

Publication information
- Publisher: IPC Media
- First appearance: 2000 AD #76 (1978)
- Created by: John Wagner; Ian Gibson

In-story information
- Alter ego: Sam Slade
- Abilities: None

Robo-Hunter is a recurring strip in the British comic 2000 AD, initially written by John Wagner and illustrated by Ian Gibson. The series starred Sam Slade, a laconic, ageing, cigar-smoking bounty hunter of robots that have gone renegade. Though action oriented, the series had a humorous tone.

== Publication history ==
The character first appeared in 1978. José Ferrer was the original artist, but the editorial team were not happy with his work and quickly replaced him with Ian Gibson, who redrew parts of Ferrer's episodes before taking over himself.

== Plots ==
=== Verdus ===
In the first storyline, "Verdus" (also known as "The Robot Planet"), Slade is dispatched to a distant colony planet to solve the mystery of its vanished colonists. An act of sabotage on his space craft causes time dilation during the trip, meaning that Slade arrives at the planet restored to his early 20s while the ship's pilot, Kidd, is now a cynical talking baby. The colony world is populated entirely by robots. These robots, charged with terraforming the planet and preparing it for colonization, have been programmed by their initial creator, a wood-burning droid called Smokin' Joe, to believe that "humans are superior to robots in every way". By the time the first colonists arrive, however, the robots' strength and technology is so far advanced that this thesis no longer holds true, thus the Verdus robots deny the humanity of their masters. Colonists are imprisoned as "simulated humans" on arrival.

The robots adhere to a strict hierarchy, with the leader of Verdus, Big Brain, as Class 9 and all others below him. Civic and military leaders are Class 7, vending and repair droids Class 1 and all others in between. For unexplained reasons, there appears to be no Class 8. Partly for Big Brain's amusement, the robots have established a society that mimics the worst elements of Earth including celebrity culture and party politics. After Big Brain's malfunction a civil war erupts between the human-loyalist First Army and the "anti-hume", or Denialist, Second. The First Army, led by a cowardly general and designed by Gibson to resemble the British Tommies of the First World War, is annihilated. Slade resolves the problem by building a radio transmitter that destroys all the planet's Robots - including Slade's ally "Boots", the first robot to believe the duo are human. Slade and Kidd show little remorse for any of the robots, although Smokin' Joe is repaired and taken back to earth, where Slade receives the "World Medal of Honour".

=== The Day of the Droids ===
A second long-running story, "The Day of the Droids", followed. Back on Earth, Sam investigates a plot replacing key officials with lifelike robot doubles in his unspecified home city (which judging by various references is located somewhere in America). This is part of robot Mafia boss the God-Droid's plan to take over the city. Meanwhile, the Amalgamated Androids Union, led by a cocktail waiter robot called Molotov, is threatening to strike. Sam is joined by an idiot kit-built robot assistant, Hoagy, and, after a crack-down on smoking in IPC Comics, is given a Cuban robot cigar called Stogie, designed to help him cut down on nicotine. Ultimately Sam defeats the God-Droid with the aid of the East Side Androids American football team, but Molotov takes all the credit, and after saving the city Sam finds himself out of a job. Slade quits the city for pastures new, spending his meagre reward money on a ticket to Brit-Cit.

=== Brit Cit cases ===
In 1982, Wagner, now working with his co-writer Alan Grant, returned to the character after an absence from 2000 AD of nineteen months. Robo-Hunter became a semi-regular feature in the comic for the next two years, during which the now Brit Cit located Sam investigated, among other cases, a plot to sabotage the robotic England football team's World Cup campaign. Sam solved a very lucrative case and retired rich, but was eventually forced out of retirement after Hoagy and Stogie spent all his money. When the series ended in 1985, Sam was back where he started, aging and down on his luck. Hoagy was given his own short story in the 1984 2000 AD album.

=== Revival ===
2000 AD revived the character in 1991, written by newcomer Mark Millar, who had a different interpretation of the characters. Peter Hogan, who replaced Millar in 1993, returned the series to a more traditional interpretation. These episodes were illustrated by Rian Hughes. In 1995, Robo-Hunter was cancelled once again. A final, one-off episode appeared a year later.

=== Samantha Slade ===
In December 2003, Alan Grant and Ian Gibson reunited for a revival of the strip starring Sam's granddaughter, Samantha Slade, Hoagy and Stogie. As of September 2007, 2000 AD has presented 27 episodes of the revived series, plus eleven short stories published in annuals and specials.
