= Hammerstein (character) =

Publication information
- Publisher: IPC Media, Fleetway
- First appearance: Starlord 1978
- Created by: Pat Mills; Kevin O'Neill

In-story information
- Alter ego: War Robot Mark III "Hammerstein"
- Team affiliations: ABC Warriors
- Notable aliases: Old Red Eyes

Hammerstein is a fictional robot, created by Pat Mills and Kevin O'Neill, who first appeared in 1978 as a member of Ro-Busters in the British comic Starlord but is best known as the leader of the ABC Warriors in 2000AD.

== Physical description ==
Hammerstein is described as a Mark III war droid and was commissioned in the early 21st Century to fight in the Volgan Wars. Hammerstein's right hand is a hammer that is used in hand-to-hand combat while on the back of his left he has a missile launcher. There are tank tracks on his feet to aid mobility. Hammerstein also has two sockets in his waist to attach auxiliary arms but he finds these embarrassing. During combat operations his head has a grim human like face but after he was decommissioned this was replaced with 'civilian' head that features a single square 'eye'.

== Fictional character biography ==
=== The Volgan War ===
Years after the Volgan occupation of Western Europe, the United States began a counter-invasion to, officially, liberate the area; unofficially, Earth's oil reserves were running low and they wanted to seize the Volgan's oil reserves. To do this they created expendable robot soldiers - ABC Warriors - designed to wage war across any terrain in any kind of combat, atomic, bacterial or chemical. The first of their number were called Hammersteins. Developed by Howard Quartz's Ro-Busters corporation, they first saw use at Fishguard in 2009, leading the Allied liberation of the United Kingdom.

The first two models were failures. The Mk I robot was an effective killer but could not distinguish between targets on their own, killing civilians as well as Volgan soldiers. When controlled remotely by human soldiers in 2009, the Volgans were able to seize control and redirect them against American forces, driving them back across Wales and causing the American public to protest the use of war-robots. Thousands of Hammersteins were destroyed for fear of Volgan reprogramming. The later Mk II was given an artificial intelligence, with different stories giving different reasons why they failed. In the original Ro-Busters story, that meant Mk II platoons surrendered to the Volgans instead of fighting; in the later ABC Warriors, the MK II's were said to be given "genuine moral values" and had become pacifists, and were killed for trying to convert human soldiers; and in Savage, the MK II's ethical values included the price of collateral damage and they surrendered rather than damage the property values of Virginia Water (a deliberate set-up by the US so the British insurgency groups would be culled).

The Mk III Hammerstein was given artificial values and emotions such as patriotism, believing the enemy is always evil, and that war is necessary to protect national interests - just enough to stop him slaughtering civilians but not question why he was fighting. Initially, his master program could not accept the secondary programs because of their logical contradictions. His programmer and a 'robopsychologist' tried to get them in sync by forcing him to feel emotions; the first genuine he felt was jealousy that they were a couple, and he murdered them without understanding why.

The first Mk III Hammerstein would be the template for those that followed. He was field-tested by having him serve with a human regiment; he faced and overcame robophobia from his comrades and came to be a trusted soldier under Sergeant "Country" Farmer's command. The human generals were pleased by this and began to withdraw human soldiers & mass-produce robot ones.

Hammerstein was promoted to sergeant and began to lead the new war robots; as a result he was one of the few whose movements weren't remotely controlled by human generals. Despite his programming, he showed a paternal interest in the other Hammerstein units under his command and at one point disobeyed orders to save them from Volgan Stalins. He also became disillusioned due to the constant horrors of war and robots being used as cannon fodder by the humans. He once removed the pain barrier - which allowed humans to remotely experience a Warrior's actions but not its pain - from a dying comrade to put him out of its misery; this killed the officer in the process, but nothing was ever proved.

=== The Mars Mission and Ro-Busters ===
He was the first ABC Warrior recruited by the mysterious Colonel Lash to work as Martian peacekeepers near the end of the war, and gathered the other recruits. His distrust of humans increased when he was ordered to recruit the Volgan butcher Blackblood and when he discovered that his fellow ABC Warriors were being slaughtered by the humans following victory. Nevertheless, Hammerstein and Colonel Lash took the newly formed team to Mars to tame the devil planet and finally bring peace to its red plains.

Following their success, the Warriors returned to Earth and separated. Hammerstein ended up with a new head and a different personality to go with it. He was eventually sold as army surplus to the much feared Ro-Busters Disaster Ltd, which saw him serving alongside the sewer robot Ro-Jaws. After helping to save countless human lives (and once going on a rampage in London after his programming reverted to the war years), Hammerstein and Ro-Jaws thwarted a plot by Ro-Buster's owner to kill all the robots for insurance money. He helped mount a mass robot escape to Saturn Six, a moon taken over by robots years before; he felt he could be made a general on this free world and viewed this as meaning he would not associate with Ro-Jaws anymore. He threw this dream away in order to cover the robots escape, fighting alongside Ro-Jaws and ten other brave robots - entering Saturn Six legend as The Hero Dozen - to cover the other robot's escape. The two of them then walked off with new identity papers singing as they went, admitting that despite their wildly different personality clashes they were still mates and would be stuck walking "side by side".

=== Nemesis the Warlock ===
As the centuries passed, Hammerstein realised war was all he knew, and decided to re-join the army. With a number of other ABC War robots, he was brought into service by Torquemada's Terminator armies during the invasion of the Gothic Empire. After being caught showing mercy to alien civilians, he and two comrades Mad Ronn and Hitaki - were reprogrammed and sent on a suicide mission. The mission was thwarted by Nemesis the Warlock, who reformed the ABC Warriors to help save the Gothic Empire from invasion and later to train the Goths in combat. They re-joined Nemesis as he ventured into the Time Wastes of Termight to find his son, Thoth. With Mad Ronn lost, their numbers were bolstered by Hammerstein's former Ro-Busters comrade Mek-Quake. The team ventured to the end of the world, and lost a second member when Hitaki was killed during the first encounter with the Monad. Adding Ro-Jaws to the team, The Warlock dispatched The Warriors into the Time Wastes alone to repair the damage done by Thoth, and stop the destruction of the planet.

=== The Black Hole and Khaos ===
During the mission, Hammerstein met and became close to a human female, Terri, who believed herself to be a robot. She had mistaken him for Craig, the father of her baby, and became equally infatuated with the ageing warrior; without the proper modifications, however, Hammerstein had no way to return her affections. The two became fiercely protective of each other, and made plans to find some remote planet and settle down. With Terri's untimely death during the final confrontation with the Monad, Hammerstein realized he was doomed to be an eternal soldier, only finding pleasure in war and destruction.

He temporarily relinquished command to Deadlock, which saw the Warriors drawn into his quest to bring Khaos to the galaxy. For most of this mission, Hammerstein was bewildered and disgusted by the task and the lunatic excesses of his comrades. The most reluctant of all The Warriors to embrace Khaos, he finally realized that he did not have to obey orders any longer and renounced Deadlock's leadership.

The Warriors went their own ways. Hammerstein agreed to let Blackblood (now an arms dealer) give him a service, only to find himself welded to a workbench, used for testing new weaponry and deliberately tortured for five years. With the help of Deadlock, Hammerstein escaped and pulled the Warriors together again to stop the Terran ship Hellbringer. During this, it was shown he was loyal to Khaos and had some understanding of it, more so than some of his comrades like Joe.

In the battle against Hellbringer a demon overloaded his neural net with all the repressed guilt from his long career, almost killing him before he took out his fury on the demon. He also discovered the other Warriors had all known he was being tortured but had deliberately not come to save him, as "Nobody likes a nice guy!" - Morrigun even informed him that his innate goodness was against the order of things and this was why bad things happened to him.

=== Return To Mars ===
He led the team back to Mars afterwards, initially to tackle a group of zombies calling themselves the Jung Cannibals. They were caught in the Medusa War where Medusa, the planetary consciousness, tried to wipe out her human settlers. Hammerstein struck a deal with the spirit and kidnapped human Mars President D.W. Cobb, though he didn't know Deadlock planned to turn Cobb into a Martian as an act of appeasement.

Cobb's 'transformation' sparked a civil war, with the Confederacy of Martian Industries on one side and the Union of Martian Free States on the other. Hammerstein led the ABC Warriors in attempting to force a peace, leading to the Confederacy hiring a seven-strong robot mercenary gang called the Shadow Warriors to assassinate them. The battle saw Hammerstein infected with parasitical brain-eating robot snakes, forced to be killed or let them kill his comrades, and though he escaped the situation he was left severely wounded. He managed to kill the Warrior responsible, Doc Maniacus, with his own snakes.

Currently, Hammerstein is leading the ABC Warriors to rescue Zippo, a robot comrade from the Volgan War.

== Bibliography ==
- Ro-Busters:
  - "The North Sea Tunnel" (by Pat Mills, with art by Carlos Pino, in Starlord No. 1, 1978)
  - "The Preying Mantis" (by Pat Mills, with art by Carlos Pino (#2, 4) and Dave Gibbons (#3), in Starlord #2–4, 1978)
  - "Midpoint" (by Chris Lowder as Bill Henry, with art by Ian Kennedy, in Starlord #5–6, 1978)
  - "The Ritz Space Hotel" (by Pat Mills, with Carlos Pino, in Starlord #7–12, 1978)
  - "Farnborough Droid Show" (by Pat Mills as V. Gross, with Ian Kennedy, in Starlord #13–14, 1978)
  - "Massacre on the Moon" (by Chris Lowder, with Carlos Pino (#15, 17, 19), Jose Luis Ferrer (#16, 18), in Starlord #15–19, 1978)
  - "The Tax Man Cometh!" (by Chris Lowder, with Jose Luis Ferrer (#20, 22), Carlos Pino (#21), in Starlord #20–22, 1978)
  - "Death on the Orient Express" (by Pat Mills, with art by Dave Gibbons, in 2000 AD #86–87, 1978)
  - "Hammerstein's War Memoirs" (by Pat Mills, with art by Kevin O'Neill, Mike Dorey and Dave Gibbons, in 2000 AD #88–92, 1978)
  - "Ro-Jaws Memoirs" (by Pat Mills, with art by Mike Dorey, in 2000 AD #93–97, 1978–1979)
  - "Fall & Rise of Ro-Jaws and Hammerstein" (by Pat Mills, with art by Kevin O'Neill and Mike McMahon, in 2000 AD #103–115, 1979)
  - "Avalanche!" (by an uncredited author, with art by Kev F. Sutherland, in 2000 AD Annual 1980, 1979)
  - "Earthquake!" (by Chris Stevens, with art by Dave Harwood, in 2000 AD Annual 1981, 1980)
  - "Bax the Burner" (by Alan Moore, with art by Steve Dillon, in 2000 AD Annual 1982, 1981)
  - "Old Red Eyes is Back" (by Alan Moore, with art by Bryan Talbot, in 2000 AD Annual 1983, 1982)
  - "Stormeagles are Go!" (by Alan Moore, with art by Joe Eckers, in 2000 AD Annual 1984, 1983)
- ABC Warriors:
  - The Meknificent Seven
    - "ABC Warriors" (with Kevin O'Neill, in 2000 AD No. 119, 1979)
    - "The Retreat from Volgow" (with Kevin O'Neill, in 2000 AD No. 120, 1979)
    - "Mongrol" (with Mike McMahon, in 2000 AD #121–122, 1979)
    - "The Order of Knights Martial" (with Kevin O'Neill (1) and Brett Ewins (2), in 2000 AD #123–124, 1979)
    - "The Bougainville Massacre" (with Mike McMahon, in 2000 AD #125–126, 1979)
    - "Steelhorn" (with Brendan McCarthy, in 2000 AD #127–128, 1979)
    - "Mars, the Devil Planet" (with Mike McMahon, in 2000 AD No. 129, 1979)
    - "Cyboons" (with Dave Gibbons, in 2000 AD #130–131, 1979)
    - "The Red Death" (with Mike McMahon, in 2000 AD #132–133, 1979)
    - "Golgatha" (with Carlos Ezquerra, in 2000 AD #134–136, 1979)
    - "Mad George" (with Mike McMahon, in 2000 AD #137–139, 1979)
    - "Red Planet Blues" (short story, written by Alan Moore, with art by Steve Dillon, in 2000AD Annual 1985, 1984)
    - "Volgow the Ultimate Death Machine" (with Steve Dillon, Diceman #2)
- Nemesis the Warlock:
  - Book IVThe Gothic Empire
  - Book V The Vengeance of Thoth
  - Book VITorquemurder!
- ABC Warriors:
  - The Black Hole (with Simon Bisley (1–4, 9–12, 17–21) and SMS (5–8, 13–16), in 2000 AD #555–566 & 573–581, 1988)
  - Khronicles of Khaos (with co-author Tony Skinner, and art by Kev Walker, in 2000 AD #750–757, 780–84 & 787–790, 1991 and 1992)
  - Hellbringer (with co-author Tony Skinner, and art by Kev Walker, in 2000 AD #904–911, 964–971, 1994 and 1995)
  - The Third Element:
    - "Roadkill" (with Kev Walker, in 2000 AD prog 2000, 1999)
    - "The Third Element " (with Henry Flint, in 2000 AD #1234–1236, 2001)
    - "The Clone Cowboys" (with Liam Sharp, in 2000 AD #1237–1239, 2001)
    - "The Tripods" (with Mike McMahon, in 2000 AD #1240–1242, 2001)
    - "The Zero Option" (with Boo Cook, in 2000 AD #1243–1245, 2001)
    - "Assault on the Red House" (with Henry Flint, in 2000 AD #1236–1248, 2001)
  - The Shadow Warriors:
    - "The Shadow Warriors Book I" (with Carlos Ezquerra, in 2000 AD #1336–1341, 2003)
    - "The Shadow Warriors Book II" (with Henry Flint, in 2000 AD #1400–1405, 2004)
    - "The Shadow Warriors Book III" (with Henry Flint, in 2000 AD #1476–1485, 2006)
  - The Volgan War:
    - "The Volgan War Vol. 1" (with Clint Langley, in 2000 AD #1518–1525, 2007)
    - "The Volgan War Vol. 2" (with Clint Langley, in 2000 AD #1550–1559, 2007)
    - "The Volgan War Vol. 3" (with Clint Langley, in 2000 AD #1601–1606, 1611–1616, 2008)
    - "The Volgan War Vol. 4" (with Clint Langley, in 2000 AD #1666–1677, 2010)
  - Return to Earth (with Clint Langley, in 2000 AD #1800–1811, 2012)
  - Return to Mars (with Clint Langley, in 2000 AD #2014, 1862-ongoing, (2013–14))

=== Hammerstein in Judge Dredd ===
In 1995, Pat Mills wrote the Judge Dredd story Hammerstein which placed the eponymous robot into Dredd's world.

In this story, Hammerstein rejoined the American army after the Mars mission, serving under General Blood 'n' Guts in President Robert L. Booth's robot armies. Following the great Atomic Wars of 2070, Hammerstein fought in The Battle of Armageddon against the Mega City Judges. Following the robot's defeat, Hammerstein was trapped under the Cursed Earth for decades before emerging, whereupon he faced off against Judge Dredd. Realizing the war was over and the Judges were no longer his enemy, Hammerstein became unsure of his purpose.

However, the subsequent story ABC Warriors: The Volgan War removes this story from continuity by having the original war against the Volgans taking place in 2083, 13 years after the Atomic Wars in Judge Dredd.

== In other media ==
Hammerstein appears as a decommissioned ABC Warrior in the 1995 film Judge Dredd, acting as Rico's bodyguard once reactivated.

== See also ==
- List of fictional robots and androids
