= Ro-Busters =

Publication information
- Publisher: Fleetway
- First appearance: (Starlord); Starlord No. 1 (May 1978) (2000 AD); 2000 AD No. 86 (October 1978)
- Created by: Pat Mills; Kevin O'Neill

In-story information
- Leader(s): Howard Quartz
- Member(s): Hammerstein; Ro-Jaws; Mek-Quake; Chatterbox

Ro-Busters is a British comic story that formed part of the original line-up of the magazine Starlord. Similar in premise to that of the Thunderbirds television series, it was created by writer Pat Mills and was drawn by Carlos Pino and Ian Kennedy initially, before Starlord's merger with 2000 AD. After the merger, Dave Gibbons, Kevin O'Neill and Mike McMahon were regular artists on the series, along with occasional contributions from Mike Dorey.

Along with Strontium Dog, Ro-Busters survived Starlord's merger with 2000 AD, its sister comic at IPC Magazines Ltd. The series introduced the decommissioned war robot Hammerstein and the sewer robot Ro-Jaws, and gave rise to the popular ABC Warriors series.

== Mandate ==
Robots are going to take over Man's dirtiest jobs . . . clearing his garbage, tending his sick, even fighting his wars! By the year 2078 people will change their robots as today they change their cars. So step now through the slick plasto-glass doors of "Flash" Harry Lowder's robo-mart in the year 2078 . . .

== Publication history ==
The story was one of those aimed at being the core of the new title Starlord, a sister-comic to 2000 AD. The concept was based on a suggestion from managing editor John Sanders and, according to writer Pat Mills "I did this really as a favour and as a way of pissing off the managing editor who pitched an idea to me about ex-servicemen with super powers who deal with disasters. It was a dreadful idea and I bypassed it by doing Ro-Busters, which he hated – so I knew my story would be a hit" Although he had stayed with 2000 AD, and would go on to be the art editor there, Kevin O'Neill provided the initial designs for Ro-Buster but would only draw the series later after its move to 2000 AD.

The stories were drawn by a number of artists and Dave Gibbons has fond memories of his work on Ro-Busters:

I used to love doing Ro-Busters. I think the "Terra-Meks" story was arguably one of my finest hours. It was a great script Pat wrote for that, really emotional and kind of 2000 AD at its best. Grandiose, outrageous concepts, yet with a real humanity and emotional depth to it as well.

Hammerstein, Ro-Jaws and Mek-Quake would go on to be members of the ABC Warriors, first introduced in Hammerstein's flashbacks to his time in the Volgan War.

After the launch of ABC Warriors Pat Mills did not write another Ro-Busters story for thirty-five years, but there were a number of one-offs published in the 2000 AD Annual during the early eighties, most notable three stories by Alan Moore which were the last Ro-Busters tales.

== Overview ==
Ro-Busters depicts a world where artificially intelligent robots are so ubiquitous they are treated with contempt by humans and there is a class hierarchy among the robots themselves. Ro-Busters is a commercial rescue organisation run by Howard Quartz, known as "Mr. 10 Per Cent" because 90% of him is robotic (a 'person' must have at least 10% organic matter to qualify as human). Quartz uses robots to carry out his perilous rescue missions because no-one cares if they live or die. Any insubordination in the ranks is dealt with by his enforcer, the psychotic and stupid "kill-dozer" Mek-Quake. Ro-Jaws and Hammerstein, the two main characters, are hugely courageous but after each successful mission they are usually greeted with indifference by the authorities.

When the owner of Ro-Busters decides to destroy the robots in an 'accident' as a tax evasion measure, Ro-Jaws and Hammerstein lead an escape plot. Once free they learn that a robot underground exists and that a safe haven for free robots has been established on the Saturn's moon Titan. The Ro-Busters by this stage are being pursued by a ruthless police unit charged with suppressing robot liberation. A transport is arranged to take the robots to Titan but at the last moment the police close in so Ro-Jaws and Hammerstein with a few volunteers lead a seeming suicide mission to fight off the authorities and buy time for their comrades to escape. The mission is a success and Ro-Jaws and Hammerstein are seen dancing into the sunset.

The series has a high degree of satiric comment on contemporary life as Pat Mills had shown on other series. The corrupt and malicious police squad sent to capture the robots is a parody of the Special Patrol Group. Some claim the wilful destruction of a productive and loyal workforce reflects the effects of Thatcherism – though the storyline was already well underway before the first Thatcher government had been elected. Ro-Jaws and Hammerstein's names are a word play on the musical writing pairing of Rodgers and Hammerstein and the story also features a number of song and dance routines.

Ro-Busters would turn up in Savage Book Five, set in an alternate 2009; a human Howard Quartz and his Ro-Busters company designed the first ABC Warriors to liberate Volgan-occupied territories. Quartz was revealed to be the brother of the US vice-president Dick Quartz and a leading arms manufacturer; when the U.S. was neutral towards the Volgans, Quartz had secretly sold weapons to them via murky legal means.

== Stories ==
Timeline: 2078 – 2080

- Day of the Robot

Starlord Starzine 1 (prologue) Unable to find buyers for his merchandise, robot dealer "Flash" Harry Lowder orders his second-hand robots to report to Mek-Quake for destruction. Ro-Jaws and Hammer-Stein are among those droids saved due to a timely intervention by billionaire entrepreneur, Howard "Mr. Ten Per Cent" Quartz.

- The North Sea Tunnel

Starlord Starzine 1 (1 episode) A submarine crashes through the North Sea Tunnel connecting Britain and Scandinavia.

- Red Mist

Starlord Starzines 2 – 4 (3 episodes) An experimental gas leaks through the Florida swamps. Humans and animals alike succumb to its effects, causing them to go insane with violent consequences.

- Midpoint

Starlord Starzines 5 – 6 (2 episodes) As part of a secret US program, Lep-574 is the latest rocket launched from the Yucca desert, Nevada. Containing nuclear waste bound for outer-space, the rocket malfunctions, crashing into Midpoint, London's foremost conference tower.

- The Ritz Space Hotel

Starlord Starzines 7 – 12 (6 episodes)

- Farnborough Droid Show

Starlord Starzines 13 – 14 (2 episodes)

- Massacre on the Moon

Starlord Starzines 15 – 19 (5 episodes)

- The Taxman Cometh!

Starlord Starzines 20 – 22 (3 episodes)

- Death on the Orient Express

2000 AD Progs Progs 86 – 87 (2 episodes)

- Hammer-Stein's War Memoirs

2000 AD Progs 88 – 92 (5 episodes) Hammerstein recounts his war stories as the first successful war robot fighting against the Volgans alongside humans.

- Ro-Jaws's Memoirs

2000 AD Progs 93 – 97 (5 episodes)

- The Terra-Meks

2000 AD Progs 98 – 101 (4 episodes) Plans to flatten and redevelop an old port go wrong when the demolition team – the gargantuan but particularly low intelligence Terra-Meks – go on the rampage. The harbour pilot, an equally large but good-natured robot stops them. The only member of the Ro-busters to appear is Mek-Quake.

- The Fall and Rise of Ro-Jaws and Hammer-Stein

2000 AD Progs 103 – 115 (13 episodes) The robots escape a planned insurance write-off when their transport craft is blown up by their own boss. They find out about the robot underground that takes robots to safety on a moon in the outer solar system. To help the others get away, a few robots (led by Hammerstein, and including Ro-jaws) stay behind.

- Avalanche!

2000 AD Annual 1980 (1 episode)

- Earthquake!

2000 AD Annual 1981 (1 episode)

- Bax the Burner

2000 AD Annual 1982 (1 episode) written by Alan Moore

- Old Red Eyes is Back!

2000 AD Annual 1983 (1 episode) written by Alan Moore

- Stormeagles Are Go!

2000 AD Annual 1984 (1 episode) written by Alan Moore

- Ro-Busters

Starlord Summer Special 1978 (1 episode)

- Ro-Jaws

Starlord Annual 1980 (1 episode)

- Ro-Busters

Starlord Annual 1981 (1 episode)

- Seeing Red

2000 AD 40th Anniversary Special (1 episode, 2017)

== Judge Dredd ==
Ro-Busters makes three references to Mega-City One, the vast megalopolis patrolled by Judge Dredd.

Mek-Quake also appears in one Walter the Wobot story set in Mega-City One, along with Judge Dredd himself.

A Judge appears in Nemesis the Warlock Book V: The Vengeance of Thoth, which also features Hammerstein, Ro-Jaws and Mek-Quake.

== Collected editions ==
The stories have been collected into one trade paperback:

- Ro-Busters (collected in The Complete Ro-Busters, 336 pages, Rebellion, November 2008, ISBN 1-905437-82-X):
  - "The North Sea Tunnel" (by Pat Mills, with art by Carlos Pino, in Starlord No. 1, 1978)
  - "The Preying Mantis" (by Pat Mills, with art by Carlos Pino (#2, 4) and Dave Gibbons (#3), in Starlord #2–4, 1978)
  - "Midpoint" (by Chris Lowder as Bill Henry, with art by Ian Kennedy, in Starlord #5–6, 1978)
  - "The Ritz Space Hotel" (by Pat Mills, with Carlos Pino, in Starlord #7–12, 1978)
  - "Farnborough Droid Show" (by Pat Mills as V. Gross, with Ian Kennedy, in Starlord #13–14, 1978)
  - "Massacre on the Moon" (by Chris Lowder, with Carlos Pino (#15, 17, 19), Jose Luis Ferrer (#16, 18), in Starlord #15–19, 1978)
  - "The Tax Man Cometh!" (by Chris Lowder, with Jose Luis Ferrer (#20, 22), Carlos Pino (#21), in Starlord #20–22, 1978)
  - "Death on the Orient Express" (by Pat Mills, with art by Dave Gibbons, in 2000 AD #86–87, 1978)
  - "Hammerstein's War Memoirs" (by Pat Mills, with art by Kevin O'Neill, Mike Dorey and Dave Gibbons, in 2000 AD #88–92, 1978)
  - "Ro-Jaws Memoirs" (by Pat Mills, with art by Mike Dorey, in 2000 AD #93–97, 1978–1979)
  - "The Terra-Meks" (by Pat Mills, with art by Dave Gibbons, in 2000 AD #98–101, 1979)
  - "Fall & Rise of Ro-Jaws and Hammerstein" (by Pat Mills, with art by Kevin O'Neill and Mike McMahon, in 2000 AD #103–115, 1979)
  - "Avalanche!" (by an uncredited author, with art by Kev F. Sutherland, in 2000 AD Annual 1980, 1979)
  - "Earthquake!" (by Chris Stevens, with art by Dave Harwood, in 2000 AD Annual 1981, 1980)
  - "Bax the Burner" (by Alan Moore, with art by Steve Dillon, in 2000 AD Annual 1982, 1981)
  - "Old Red Eyes is Back" (by Alan Moore, with art by Bryan Talbot, in 2000 AD Annual 1983, 1982)
  - "Stormeagles are Go!" (by Alan Moore, with art by Joe Eckers, in 2000 AD Annual 1984, 1983)

== See also ==
- List of fictional robots and androids
