= Red Planet Blues =

Red Planet Blues may refer to:

- A 1984 ABC Warriors story by Alan Moore, Steve Dillon and John Higgins published in the 2000AD Annual 1985
- A 2013 novel by Robert J. Sawyer
