= ABC Warriors =

Feature in the UK comic-book series 2000 AD

- ABC Warriors trade paperback cover by Mike McMahon; 2000 AD and ABC Warriors copyright Rebellion A/S 2005

Publication information
- Publisher: IPC Media, Fleetway, Rebellion Developments
- First appearance: 2000 AD prog 119 (1979)
- Created by: Pat Mills; Kevin O'Neill; Mike McMahon; Brendan McCarthy

In-story information
- Base(s): Mars, Earth
- Member(s): Hammerstein; Deadlock; Joe Pineapples; Mongrol; Blackblood; Mek-Quake; Steelhorn; Happy Shrapnel; Mad Ronn; Hitaki; Ro-Jaws; Terri; Morrigun; Zippo

ABC Warriors is a feature in the UK comic-book series 2000 AD written by Pat Mills. It first appeared in program (issue) 119 in 1979 and continues to run as of 2018. Art for the opening episodes was by Kevin O'Neill, Mike McMahon, Brett Ewins, and Brendan McCarthy, who among them designed the original seven members of the team. Since then, they have been illustrated primarily, though not exclusively, by Bryan Talbot, Simon Bisley, SMS, Kevin Walker, Henry Flint and Clint Langley. The A.B.C. Warriors are a team of war robots designed to withstand 'Atomic', 'Bacterial' and 'Chemical' warfare. They were built to take part in the long-running Volgan War, which Mills had described in several previous 2000 AD strips, including Invasion! and Ro-Busters. Each robot has a distinctive personality – often one programmed by its human creators – but each is more or less able to act with free will.

== Overview ==
One of the main characters, Hammerstein, was already known to 2000 AD readers through the story Ro-Busters (originally started in the magazine Starlord). The story of the creation of robotic warriors to be used in the Volgan War had been introduced in the Ro-Busters story "Hammerstein's War Memoirs." Hammerstein is the only ABC Warrior to appear on film, making a cameo appearance in the 1995 Judge Dredd movie.

The initial run of stories from progs 119–128 follows Hammerstein towards the end of the Volgan War as he recruits six robots to join him for a special mission – to tame Mars, which had become a futuristic Wild West. In further adventures set much later in time, the warriors teamed up with Nemesis the Warlock in his fight against the Termight Empire to prevent a destabilized Black Hole bypass at the Earth's core from destroying the world.

Many of these early stories pursue the theme of humans using robots to do jobs that they do not wish to do themselves (following the same theme as Ro-Busters) and the cruel treatment of soldier robots by their human officers. The Warriors often find themselves at odds with humans who are exploiting the land and the beings that live on it – typical storylines see the Warriors identifying such evil and delivering poetic justice to the perpetrators. Later stories also explore ideas of "khaos" and the concept of programmed robots being able to discover their true identities.

Artists who illustrated ABC Warriors include Kevin O'Neill, Mike McMahon, Brett Ewins, Brendan McCarthy, Carlos Ezquerra, Dave Gibbons, Simon Bisley, Kev Walker, and Henry Flint.

== Characters ==
The members of the Warriors have changed over the course of the stories they have been featured in. Here are the longest-serving members:

=== Hammerstein ===
Hammerstein has been the leader of the Warriors for most of the comic's run, although he has surrendered the position to Deadlock for a number of stories. He was the first successful war robot to be built, and this success was due to his being given both emotions and a conscience, which allowed him to distinguish between combatants and civilians.

In the first run of ABC Warriors stories, he was recruited during the Volgan Wars by the mysterious Colonel Lash to lead the ABC Warriors on Lash's post war project. Overall humanoid in form, his right "hand" is the combat hammer that gives him his name. Depicted as noble, brave, and patriotic, he has always represented the compassionate "heart" of the team while remaining a formidable warrior.

=== Deadlock ===
Deadlock is a follower of the Khaos religion, and as such is frequently at odds with the order and duty-obsessed Hammerstein, which eventually led him to betray and attempt to kill Hammerstein in the story The Black Hole. Deadlock's powers allow him to astrally project and reform his body if it is damaged or destroyed, and he holds the sword X-Caliber, a weapon that allows him to drain the souls of the living to use as psychic "nourishment". He is able to call demons and the undead to his aid. For a time, Deadlock led the team in place of Hammerstein, the only other member ever to do so.

When first shown, Deadlock was the Grand Wizard of the Knights Martial, a group of highly intelligent robots who had developed psychic and magical abilities and observed the war from the "Watch Tower" space station. They were given special authority to try and execute Volgan war criminals during the conflict, as well as war criminals from their own side. Deadlock occasionally led his Knights into active combat, such as to take down and reprogram the Volgan robot general Volkhan so he could no longer create robots outside of human control.

The Watch Tower was brought to earth by Volgan artillery during the war, just before Hammerstein recruited Deadlock for the Mars mission. On his eventual return, Deadlock discovered that in his absence the Knights – no longer kept chaste and pure by isolation far above the earth's surface – had been tainted and turned to frivolous pursuits, ignoring the old values of meditation, purity, and discipline. A disgusted Deadlock turned his back on the order and went into isolation, meditating and studying ancient manuscripts in an attempt to reach the highest level of the astral plane, and join with his master Khaos. When he was ready, it was Nemesis himself who came for him, and they became one, as shown in Nemesis the Warlock Book Four: The Gothic Empire.

Centuries passed with no word of his whereabouts, though at some point he established a Kollege of Khaos on the comet Tiamat. He finally reappeared in the bowels of Terra to assist older versions of his former comrades, sent back from the future Termight by Nemesis the Warlock, to save the planet from destruction – a mission depicted in the story The Black Hole. Although his motives were unclear at first, he assisted the Warriors in their battles with the Monad, a creature from the end of time, only to betray them when they finally reached their goal. It turned out he had been sent by his master Khaos to ensure the destruction of Termight so Khaos might spread throughout the galaxy. With the assistance of Blackblood and Mek-Quake, Deadlock launched a fearsome attack on his comrades in a bid to stop them from repairing the damage done to the Time Wastes; he was forced to betray his master and save Termight so the Monad would not use the planet's destruction to turn Khaos into an evil force.

Escaping the Time Wastes, Deadlock assumed leadership of The Warriors and led them to Nemesis' home planet, Gandarva, to settle a score. The repair of the Time Wastes had restored Order to the galaxy and thus Deadlock and Nemesis had both betrayed Khaos. The two of them fought literally to the death, only to be reborn, purged of their guilt. Deadlock then took the Warriors to the planet Hekate, inducting them (both willingly and forcibly) into the ways of Khaos; he led them in collecting the heads of seven symbols of order, which could be used in a ritual to spread Khaos throughout the galaxy. After succeeding, the other Warriors defied his command, demonstrating their status as true Khaos warriors.

Following this, he returned to his Kollege with Ro-Jaws, who understood the twisting tides of Khaos even better than he did. They worked to indoctrinate students into the ways of Khaos – often via the bar – while also hunting down teachers throughout the galaxy and flying back to the Kollege to be endlessly tortured. Ten years after the Hekate mission, he led the Warriors' reformation to combat the Terran weapon Hellbringer.

Subsequently, they returned to Mars under the command of Hammerstein, where Deadlock was instrumental in bringing about an end to the war between the human colonists and the planetary consciousness, Medusa. Deadlock helped broker a peace and he stayed on to help the Warriors in the resulting Martian civil war. It was Deadlock who discovered that the Confederacy of Martian Industries was assembling the mercenary Shadow Warriors team to destroy the Warriors, who learned the identities of its members and whose khaos rituals turned the tide in the final battle against them.

=== Joe Pineapples ===
Joe Pineapples is the closest thing Hammerstein has to a friend, being his longest-serving comrade. Joe was built as an assassin, is a former member of the elite X-Terminators (he was fired for an unspecified incident involving a human officer's wife), and is a sniper without equal. Joe has rebuilt himself many times to give himself new looks over the years, but one thing that has been consistent is his narcissism – the one thing he truly loves in the universe is himself. With an outward image of ice cold professionalism and a habit of seducing women, he has a secret fetish for wearing women's underwear.

The first run of ABC Warriors stories showed Joe's talents taking him into Volgograd to assassinate Volgan general Volkhan, and afterwards assigning him to the Mars mission; he forcibly recruited General Blackblood by shooting the butcher through the heart, beginning a long-standing feud between the two. After Mars, Pineapples wound up working as a police instructor in London and once had to neutralise a rampaging Hammerstein who thought he was still fighting the Volgan War. Joe's career with various police forces continued in some form for centuries, and by the time Earth had become Termight he was on the free robot planet of Mekka working as an undercover officer. At some point he developed a hatred of humans ("meatheads") and was eventually put on the black list for pursuing human criminals with too much zeal. Pineapples also began taking up transvestism, apparently jaded from rebuilding himself time and time again and wanting to experience something new. Blackblood was able to obtain photo negatives of this.

At the request of Nemesis, the Warlock, Joe left the police to rejoin the ABC Warriors in the battle to defend the Gothic Empire. Following the battle against Termight, the Warriors followed Nemesis into the Time Wastes of Termight to find the Warlock's offspring Thoth and repair the damage Thoth was doing to time itself, and save the galaxy. When Deadlock tried to sabotage the mission, Blackblood and Joe fought each other. For Pineapples it was a chance to get the negatives back, and for Blackblood it was a chance to finally discover what Joe had been hiding in his chest locker for the entire journey. As it turned out, the mystery item was a human heart: Joe was carrying it in a desperate bid to feel, so he could enjoy killing again.

After escaping to the planet Hekate, Pineapples helped collect the seven heads needed for the ritual that would spread Khaos through the galaxy, but suffered a breakdown as the 'Night of the Blood Moon' approached. Deadlock took it upon himself to perform an unnecessary operation on Joe, to give him a much more Khaotic outlook on life – and unlock his repressed desires for more exotic crossdressing. After Hekate, the Warriors went their separate ways, and Pineapples, sick of being on the dole for Khaos, signed up with the Terran Empire as a professional hit droid. As a result of his wealth and status, he was forced to join the Warriors when they banded together to take on the Terran supership Hellbringer.

He joined the Warriors in returning to Mars to help increase the peace between Medusa, the planetary consciousness, and her human settlers. When civil war broke out in the aftermath and the mercenary Shadow Warriors were sent after them, Joe developed a severe rivalry with mercenary and highwayman Dog-Tag, sparked when Joe foiled one of Dog-Tag's heists, wiped out his gang and caused severe damage to him. Dog-Tag got revenge when he shot Joe through the head, buried him and removed his trigger finger. Due to techniques learned from Deadlock, Joe survived the attack – having shut down his brain to near-death levels – and was able to kill his rival.

=== Blackblood ===
Blackblood is a former Volgan war robot who was forcibly recruited into the Warriors. A master tactician and interrogator, his skills also extend to treachery and betrayal, two things at which he is highly adept. He dislikes Hammerstein intensely, but this is nothing compared to his hatred of Joe Pineapples – the robot responsible for his capture. His constant undermining of Hammerstein's leadership has led to many confrontations between the two, and a healthy disrespect that has spanned the centuries. He is currently a member of the Church of Judas, a religion for robots who have betrayed their masters and pray to Judas to take away the guilt.

The 2011 Savage story Secret City would retcon that Blackblood was originally a whole series of Volgan robots, a counterpart to the Allied Hammersteins. The Blackblood Mark Ones came online in 2009 and were only crudely sentient; they were programmed to dismember and behead their enemies, to ensure Allied robots would be fully disabled (and without any reprogramming when they were sent against humans), and with no ability to distinguish friend from foe. Bill Savage discovered their field trials in the Midlands' Zone of Alienation.

Decades later, the Volgan scientist Dr Zakaroff sought to create a robot warrior capable of treachery but initially failed to do so with Blackblood. In desperation, Zakaroff turned to the occult, and used a mixture of black magic and science to harness the betrayal of two lovers, whom he forced to torture each other. Blackblood went on to prove his newly discovered treachery by killing Zakaroff, having one of his eyes shot out in the process. He left the socket empty as a reminder of his greatest act of betrayal.

During the Volgan War he led the Straw Dogs, experts in jungle warfare and terror tactics, and was rumoured to drink the oil of dead ABC Warriors. He was also responsible for trying to stop Joe Pineapples and Zippo after a failed hit on General Volkhan, causing the remote self-destruction of hundreds of foreign robots in the attempt. He would also root out internal enemies, such as robot designers Mikhail and Marina Zhigunov; he viciously tortured one of their subordinates to uncover the truth, shot the Zhigunovs dead, and attempted to kill their daughter Lara before being temporarily deactivated by partisans. Later on, assisting Volklhan, he used Zhigunov's virus to infect Steelhorn and cause the Warrior to begin murdering civilians and allies. He also developed an obsession with discovering the secret enemy officer "General Public", due to a misunderstanding.

Realising his skills in guerrilla warfare would be a valuable asset, Colonel Lash ordered Hammerstein to hunt down Blackblood and forcibly recruit him; Joe Pineapples took him down by shooting him through the heart, and his worst excesses were then removed by brain surgery. He was then sent on the Mars mission.

After Mars, little is known of Blackblood's activities. He eventually turned up on the free robot planet of Mekka, where he plied a trade as a "business man" under the name Bunyon Snipe, selling addictive software to robots; he married an exotic dancer, Ruby Yum Yum Gluck, and still drank the oil of other robots. He also came into possession of certain negatives about Joe Pineapples at a party and was using them for blackmail purposes. He would eventually be forcibly recruited by Nemesis the Warlock into the newly reformed ABC Warriors, fighting against the Terminators before heading into the Time Wastes.

He and the other Warriors went on to repair the damage done to the Time Wastes' Black Hole Control Room and save Terra from destruction. During the mission, Blackblood yet again proved that his treachery knew no bounds as he betrayed the Warriors to the Eternal Soldiers of Agartha, and then assisted Deadlock in a sabotage attempt to stop the Warriors from completing their task. It was during this foray into the Time Wastes that Blackblood lost his leg; he killed a road crew and took their road drill as a substitute. Following this, he and the rest of the Warriors briefly helped Deadlock attempt to spread Khaos throughout the galaxy; Blackblood loved this job due to the bloodshed involved, and the influence of Khaos on the Warriors allowed him to be more murderous and sadistic.

Leaving the Warriors again after tiring of Deadlock's command (due to the Khaos influence), Blackblood set up an arms dealership and even took on a pet dog while torturing a trapped Hammerstein for five years (he happily sent photos of it to every other Warrior). When Hammerstein got free and reformed the Warriors again, Blackblood was forced to sign up under threat of death.

He returned to Mars to help keep the peace between the human colonists and the planetary consciousness, Medusa – though he stated he had his own reasons for doing so, which were soon to become apparent. In the battle against the Shadow Warriors (whom he respected for their brutality), Blackblood faced off against the Rev, head of the Church of Judas, and killed him in a vicious battle. Most recently, he permanently alienated Mongrol after it was revealed that he tried to kill his beloved Lara during the war. Even this paled to nothing when he informed an institutionalised Mek-Quake that the ABCs were permanently replacing him, leading to the embittered bulldozer engineering a jailbreak for the Volgan war criminal Volkhan, incarcerated at the same asylum. Blackblood defected from the team at a crucial point in their attempt to rescue Zippo in Marineris City, joining Volkhan's rebellion as his right-hand man. Volkhan and Blackblood escaped and went into hiding after their attempt to destroy the ABC Warriors failed, but with his true colours now firmly revealed, it's a certainty that they are only biding their time until the next attempt.

=== Mongrol ===
The immensely strong Mongrol was originally the commander of an ABC paratrooper platoon, and the only survivor (save Zippo) of the disastrous drop into Volgan territory at Vilnius – so disastrous that it was nicknamed Zarnhem after Arnhem. Only his head remained undamaged and remained on the battlefield. A scavenger named Lara, the daughter of executed robot manufacturers, salvaged his head and built him a new body with other robot parts as an act of defiance against the Volgans. She was caught and executed, and Mongrol was tortured by electricity for information – this inadvertently activated his body, and he broke free of his captors.

The torture and Lara's death reduced him to near animal-like behaviour ("Mongrol smush!"), and he was regarded as a threat by both sides. He was recruited when Hammerstein earned his respect by beating him in hand-to-hand combat. Mongrol's belief that he would go to heaven and meet his beloved Lara once more became the driving force of the metal ape. After being told by Deadlock that only good robots go to heaven, he became determined to live a hero's life and see his beloved again.

After the Mars mission, he found work with P.T. Bar-Num's "Death Circus" on the free robot planet Mekka. He played the part of The Gawk, a giant metal monster that would be defeated by the heroic Spar-Tekus in every show. He'd been playing that role for so long that he'd forgotten who he was. He was found by Nemesis the Warlock and brought back into the ranks of The ABC Warriors to help save the Gothic Empire from a Terminator invasion. He was then dispatched with the other Warriors into the Time Wastes of Termight to repair the damage done to it. During their journey, Blackblood broke the news to Mongrol that robots simply go to the smelter rather than heaven, so he would never see Lara again. As a result, Mongrol turned to his 'father' – a screwdriver.

After saving Terra from destruction, Mongrol followed the others to the planet Hekate, to collect the seven heads needed for the ritual that would spread Khaos throughout the Terran Empire. Mongrol was stripped of his ability to speak, but he was given the quick reactions and speed of a naturally born beast as compensation. After completing their mission on Hekate, Mongrol left for the Temple of the Night Maras with Morrigun, and became nothing more than her mindless (and overly protective) pet. Both he and his "mistress" joined The ABC Warriors again to take on the Terran superweapon Hellbringer.

On the return to Mars, Mongrol's body was destroyed, forcing him to relocate his positronic brain into his new body. This reactivated long-dormant circuits, restoring his original intelligence (as well as a taste for cigars). He is still suffering from deep-seated issues over Lara, and when her memory was mocked by the Shadow Warrior Warmonger, Mongrol ripped him to pieces.

Following Blackblood's recounting of his Volgan War experiences and the revelation that he tried to kill Lara, Mongrol went berserk and stated that, at the end of that mission, either Blackblood leaves the Warriors, or he will. However, Blackblood had already set things up so Mek-Quake would free Volkhan from Broadband Asylum, and he would go on to abandon the ABC Warriors mid-battle and rejoin Volkhan's army, gleefully slaughtering civilians once more and trying to kill the ABC Warriors. He is currently at large, an enemy of the Warriors once more.

=== Steelhorn / The Mess ===
An elite droid built from indestructible alloys, Steelhorn was proclaimed a hero to the West and seen as one by Volgan civilians whom he liberated, even possessing a secret underground base. Due to his Vortex Hammer weapon, the Volgans viewed him as a war criminal, and so Volkhan and Blackblood infected him with a computer virus that caused him to start massacring civilians and fellow Warriors. Zippo eventually stopped Steelhorn and the virus was deleted, and the massacres were covered up by the military – but he was left traumatised and disillusioned by what he'd done.

Steelhorn eventually ended the Volgan War by killing the Volgan Marshall. Following the war, he went to a demobilisation camp to be reprogrammed for civilian life, believing he would become a firefighter and save lives, only to find himself falling into a fusion furnace—which was now being used to kill the ABC Warriors now that victory had been won. With his dying breaths, Steelhorn cursed humans for their treachery.

He survived the furnace, but his body was reduced to a bubbling mess. Consumed with hatred, the Mess slaughtered the human responsible before escaping. Hammerstein, realising it was actually Steelhorn, saved the Mess and had him poured into a vacuum flask that would be carried by Mongrol. The metal ape was the only one who could understand what the Mess was trying to say. The shambles would accompany the Mars mission.

On Mars, the Warriors encountered a giant robot called George, one of the original Garganteks – giant robots who had originally helped terraform Mars for human colonisation. Because of his size, each of George's limbs was controlled by a separate brain, with a master brain supposedly in charge. The Mess ended up inside George, using its liquid state to connect George's brains and turn him into a fearsome fighting machine. When the Mars mission was complete, George and the Mess remained behind after the Mars mission was completed.

Centuries later, continued terraforming awoke Medusa, the planetary consciousness, and caused her to try to wipe out humanity. She destroyed George for the crime of terraforming her and discovered the Mess as a result; finding it shared her hatred of humans, she rebuilt it into a new incarnation of Steelhorn. He now possessed certain psychic powers allowing him to control Martian wildlife. He became Medusa's voice, organising the attacks on the human settlements and personally leading the slaughter at Viking City, which saw almost the entire population massacred by a Martian born virus. The ABC Warriors fought the new Steelhorn and eventually struck a deal with him and Medusa, agreeing to peaceful coexistence if human President Cobb was transformed into a Martian.

Steelhorn re-joined the ranks of The ABC Warriors in place of the deceased Morrigun, in a bid to increase peace on Mars after Cobb's transformation sparked a civil war. While travelling with them to New Sidona to fend off Confederacy soldiers, Steelhorn was taken out by the rival Shadow Warriors, melted to a sludge once more. Due to occult activities by Deadlock, he was reborn in a diamond form and brought about the ABC Warriors' victory.

He has two horns, one of which when played incites wildlife to rebel. He has not said what the other will do, but it is to be played in the event of a Confederate victory and the consequences would presumably be devastating.

=== Mek-Quake ===
Mek-Quake is a dim-witted and sadistic former demolition droid. Serving mainly as comic relief, he was originally a member of the Ro-Busters, used for internal discipline within the rescue squad (mainly by destroying troublemakers), and did not join the Warriors until their later phase. In the 2010 Savage Book VI: Crims story, Mek-Quake makes a cameo appearance destroying compromised Hammersteins in 2009 (which makes him both the oldest warrior and the oldest AI robot).

His original body was that of a very large bulldozer, as seen throughout the run of Ro-Busters. When he reappeared in Book III of Nemesis the Warlock, fighting for the evil Termight empire, his (tiny) brain was now housed in a colossal siege robot with a head vaguely resembling a cat's. Despite his enormous destructive power, his stupidity ultimately ended up making the situation even worse for the Terminators. In Book IV of Nemesis, he returned to his original body; he later switched between this, and a vaguely humanoid body stolen from a defeated opponent, depending on the requirements of each mission.

Despite initially fighting against them, Mek-Quake was recruited to the Warriors by Nemesis, who realised that his insatiable appetite for mayhem and near-indestructibility made him a useful asset – as well as the fact that his limited intelligence and considerable survival instinct meant he had no loyalties except to whichever side would give him the most opportunity to destroy things.

For "Black Hole", Mek-Quake's bulldozer body was redesigned as a heavily armed "killdozer", with a prehensile neck and a "face" with a permanent angry scowl. The killdozer body was blown up in 'The Clone Cowboys', leaving him in humanoid form. This – the current – version of Mek-Quake has ranged in height from five to fifteen feet, depending on the artist, though he is generally depicted as the largest of the Warriors.

What Mek-Quake lacks in intelligence (which is a lot) he makes up for in cruelty and destructive force. However, he is also something of a coward, preferring softer targets that he can inflict more pain upon while chanting his catchphrase: "Big jobs!" He has no compunctions about massacring humans, as evidenced in The Third Element when he is annoyed about having missed most of a battle because of the time it took to remove all the "human gristle" clogging his caterpillar tracks. In his early stories he openly loathed Hammerstein and Ro-Jaws (as a result of their time in Ro-Busters), but later this hatred was toned down to a general dislike of everything and everybody except videos of chainsaw torture. Despite this Mek-Quake is eager to show his intelligence and importance, and in Kronicles of Khaos he kept trying to join in at the end of Deadlock's statements so he could seem like he was already versed in Khaos.

He continued to be part of the Warriors in their return to Mars as they tried to keep the peace during a civil war, developing an interest in conspiracy theories and rap music, but it was clear that his increasing mental instability was putting the rest of the team in danger. After the defeat of the Shadow Warriors, Mek-Quake was checked into a robot asylum by the others. While Hammerstein seemed sad to see his former enemy depart, the others appeared more than eager to meet his replacement, Zippo. Mek-Quake was assigned to clean the cell of former Volgan General Volkhan – but when Blackblood called up to gleefully tell him he was going to be replaced, an embittered Mek-Quake freed Volkhan and his associates and helped kill the asylum staff. He then joined with Volkhan and Blackblood in an attempt to destroy the rest of the ABC Warriors, as well as Marineris City. When the rebellion failed and he was abandoned to his fate by Volkhan's troops, Mek-Quake managed to escape destruction with Steelhorn's fusion hammer and unwittingly found himself a celebrity in the Union of Martian Free States for the destruction of the Marinus Red House. After promoting his book tour, Mek-Quake has found employment as Howard Quartz's bodyguard, and was most recently responsible for murdering Tubal Caine's adopted son.

=== Ro-Jaws ===
Ro-Jaws was involved in a number of the ABCs adventures, acting largely as comic relief. A working-class sewer droid with filthy habits and a love of refuse, he was originally a law-abiding robot until he was thrown in jail for taking a sick homeless man into a Cabinet minister's house (believing the minister to be a friend). The abuses in robot prison, as well as mixing with criminal robots, caused Ro-Jaws to develop a crude, disrespectful and anarchic attitude, gaining him an interest in robot rebellion. (He assisted robot resistance agents but was considered too silly-looking) He was briefly owned by a rich family as a companion for their daughter Annabel; the two became great friends, and it is unknown how that ended. It is known from the first Ro-Busters that he hit his master (unknown if this was Annabel's father), putting him in the hospital, and that is why he was thrown away.

He first met Hammerstein when they were both "Second Hand Bargains" at a robot shop, and the two were bought by the Ro-Busters disaster agency. The two clashed repeatedly due to their differing personalities but would develop a strong sense of friendship. In one incident, they went undercover to investigate murders on a space station, and Ro-Jaws discovered it was the work of robots who were planning a rebellion; Ro-Jaws found the uprising was being secretly directed by humans, and noted he'd have joined the uprising if it had been run by robots. Ro-Jaws and Hammerstein were eventually forced to go on the run when they were nearly killed for the insurance money, and helped a number of robots escape Earth to the robot free world Saturn Six; they threw away the chance to make it to Saturn Six themselves by staying behind to cover the escape. They then went underground with new identity papers, singing together as they went off, they'd always be "walking along side by side".

Many centuries in the future, Ro-Jaws was working in a hotel in the Gothic Empire and ended up as a valet for Nemesis the Warlock. Ro-Jaws swiftly became a trusted aide and was reunited with Hammerstein in the process, encouraging Nemesis to save his old friend from execution. His brief turn as an official ABC warrior occurred when Nemesis despatched the warriors into the Time Wastes to repair the damage done by his son Thoth; when Terri was inducted into the warriors early into the subsequent Black Hole mission, Ro-Jaws cheerfully gave up this position, although he continued to be a hanger-on for some time. He remained for the Hekate mission and quickly got to grips with Khaos. Following the mission, he left the team with Deadlock to work at the Kollege of Khaos; Deadlock considers Ro-Jaws to understand the nature of Khaos even better than he does.

Despite their polar opposite personalities, he regards Hammerstein as a good friend and has saved the soldier's life several times. In a flashback to the Ro-Busters days, it was him who ensured a temporarily rampaging Hammerstein was taken down non-lethally before Mek-Quake reached and killed him; he worked to convince Nemesis to prevent his execution in The Gothic Empire; and in Khronicles of Khaos he asked Deadlock if he could turn Hammerstein into a more Khaotic person, believing it would be beneficial to him. However, in a contradictory moment in Hellbringer, Ro-Jaws (like everyone else) was shown to have known Hammerstein was being tortured by Blackblood but had no interest in helping him.

In 2010, he returned in The Volgan War Book 4, where it was revealed that he had been hiding out on Mars (as a public toilet cleaner) under the alias "U-Fox" and helping Zippo in his resistance activities. As U-Fox, he'd racked up a reputation as an outlaw graffiti artist. He assisted the Warriors against Volkhan and his armies, distracting Mek-Quake with a series of "your mother" jokes and leading the bulldozer away from the larger battle. Afterwards, he remained in Marineris City.

Ro-Jaws also served as the "host" for a series of short one-off strips, under the title Ro-Jaws Robot Tales. In 2006, he was a central figure in a tribute poster to deceased letterer Tom Frame, sharing a drink with the robot representing Frame. Taken together, the names "Ro-Jaws and Hammerstein" serve as a pun on the famous Broadway musical-writing team of Rodgers and Hammerstein.

=== Other members ===
Up until Blackblood's defection in 2010, there had always been a "core five" in the ABC Warriors – Hammerstein, Joe, Deadlock, Blackblood. and Mongrol – that remained unchanged, except for the ten years or so when Nemesis the Warlock took the place of Deadlock. Various other characters have occupied the sixth and seventh positions as they became vacant. The two other original members were Steelhorn and Happy Shrapnel; they are also the only ex-members to return, though both in radically different forms. Except for Ro-Jaws and Mek-Quake, every other former member was killed in action.

==== Happy Shrapnel/Tubal Caine ====
A crusty and cantankerous veteran with a malfunctioning voicebox that punctuated his sentences with buzzes, Happy was originally a "combat test dummy" made a little unhinged by the numerous battlefield tests he had been put through. He wielded Kolt 45s stolen from a dead Volgan general and wore clothing taken from dead humans – sometimes with parts of the corpses still in them. Killed "off-camera" in a bar brawl soon after the end of the Warrior's original mission and buried by the others on Mars, it was his death that prompted the others to first go their separate ways.

Decades later, he was also the reason that the team returned, when they received electronic signals telling them that he was still alive and that the evils they had rid Mars of were returning. The Warriors helped Happy rebuild himself, but he refused to rejoin them. Renaming himself "Tubal Caine", the former Happy reluctantly agreed to be the Warrior's armourer, refitting and repairing them after their many battles on Mars. He remained neutral until Blackblood defected to Volkhan's army, whereupon the other Warriors asked him once more to join them. Tubal revealed that in his time as a blacksmith, he adopted a child named Tom, who had fallen out with his Humpy brethren after choosing to ignore their outdated beliefs. Tubal was later approached by Howard Quartz with Mek-Quake in tow, demanding that he terminate Volkhan. Refusing to serve Quartz, Quartz activated the ruined robots in Caine's scrapyard, causing them to attack. Despite sustaining severe injuries, Tubal fought off the machines, but was instead attacked by Mek-Quake, who severed his head.

Tom Caine opened fire on Mek-Quake, but his weapon malfunctioned, leaving Mek-Quake open to murder him. The shock of seeing his son murdered and suffering severe damage caused Tubal's system to crash, as Quartz had intended. When he re-activated and re-attached his head, Tubal was restored to default status, becoming Happy Shrapnel again, and no longer a pacifist. Hearing his story, the warriors joined Happy and helped him seek vengeance against Quartz.

==== Hitaki ====
Programmed to act like an ancient samurai by a Japanese secret society, Hitaki was a comrade of Hammerstein and Mad Ronn in the Terminators. After being thwarted in a suicide mission against the Goth Queen by Nemesis, he was inducted into the newly reformed ABC Warriors. He was beheaded by the Monad at the end of the world; Mek-Quake then crushed his body beyond repair before he could be fixed, killing him.

==== Mad Ronn ====
A bomb-disposal robot during the Volgan Wars, he possessed highly sensitive electronic sensors. He was a Terminator alongside Hammerstein and Hitaki and was sent on the suicide mission against the Gothic Empire, then joined the new ABC Warriors. Ronn died while trying to defuse a Terminator bomb before it killed alien refugees.

==== Terri ====
One of the organic slaves (a "Terr-1") of the Mekaniks, the single-minded robot guardians of the Black Hole and the Tomb of Emperor Zallin, she grew up believing herself to be a robot, albeit a low-caste one due to being made of flesh. She has attempted to make her mind & body just like her masters, possessing incredible strength and the ability to absorb pain unflinchingly, and she believes in logic and recycling. When the Mekaniks murdered her infant son, she turned on them, believing this proved them illogical.

She was made the seventh ABC Warrior by Deadlock and developed a strong romantic relationship with Hammerstein, whom she believed was the father of her child. The two of them planned to settle down and retire after the Black Hole mission, but she was killed during the battle against the Monad.

==== Morrigun ====
Originally a bar waitress on Hekate before she was drafted, she was an expert at the martial art Nekra Chi and wielded both Moon Flails and Pentangs – metal throwing stars powered by Khaos. As a field test, she personally retrieved one of the seven heads for the Khaos ritual. During the mission, she took Mongrol as a pet and left with him afterwards to study with the Khaos priestesses called the Night Maras. She rejoined the Warriors for the Hellbringer mission.

She was killed on Mars while trying to save the native Trimorphs from a pogrom, being crushed beyond repair by a tank.

==== Zippo ====
Zippo AKA Agent Orange is a flamethrower unit ("a Zippo") that formerly served in special forces against the Volgans and reported directly to Colonel Lash. His agenda during the war was enigmatic; sometimes it was to assist the ABC Warriors, whereas in the "Zarnhem" massacre (a battle deliberately lost by Western officers for propaganda purposes) it was to ensure there were no survivors. He has a habit of inscribing mottoes and messages on the weapons and cigarette lighters of his comrades. He has history with all of the surviving original ABC Warriors, and has inscribed messages on most of their weapons.

After the war, he eventually ended up in Marineris City ("Mekana") on Mars. Friends of his were killed in anti-robot riots. He ended up becoming an outlaw, mentored as a graffiti artist by the insane "tagger" Kroll; he left messages and occasionally took out police officers to eventually provoke an uprising. He was eventually captured by the G-Men, a specialist police unit, while his mentor Kroll was killed. The ABC Warriors rescued him from execution and gave him Mek-Quake's recently vacated place in the team.

=== Members as of 2014 ===
As of 2014, the current ABC Warriors are Hammerstein, Deadlock, Joe Pineapples, Mongrol, Steelhorn, Zippo and Tubal Caine.

== Stories ==
=== The Mek-nificent Seven ===
The ABC Warriors (story untitled, 1 episode, art by Kevin O'Neill)

Introduces Joe Pineapples and Happy Shrapnel. Hammerstein first comes to the attention of the mysterious Colonel Lash.

Retreat From Volgow (1 episode, Brendan McCarthy)

Colonel Lash arranges a 'test' for Hammerstein – withdrawing tank support when the Volgans reactivate a unit of robots so brutal they were deactivated by their own side for fear of the damage they could cause. Hammerstein defeats and kills 'Old Horney', the first Volgan war robot and so his counterpart to. Lash then reveals part of his mission: he wants Hammerstein and his unit to recruit a number of other robots for a classified mission, beginning with the fearsome Mongrol.

Mongrol (2 episodes, Mike McMahon)

Hammerstein, Joe and Happy track down the renegade robot Mongrol. Hammerstein realises the only thing Mongrol respects is strength – he has to defeat him in combat. This proves easier said than done, but when Volgan forces attack, Mongrol's thirst for revenge against those who killed Lara, his creator, overpowers his urge to fight Hammerstein. The two join forces to defeat the attackers, and the simple-minded behemoth pledges to follow his new master.

The Order of the Knights Martial (2 episodes, Kevin O'Neill and Brett Ewins)

Hammerstein's next recruit is Deadlock, Grand Wizard of the Knights Martial. Deadlock has foreseen why Hammerstein has come – if he can defeat Deadlock in combat, he will join him – but if he fails, Deadlock will claim his life. Despite Deadlock's psychic powers and black magic, Hammerstein wins the duel, and Deadlock reluctantly agrees to join the ABC Warriors.

The Bougainville Massacre (2 episodes, Mike McMahon)

The Warriors take on the Straw Dog soldiers of ruthless Volgan war robot General Blackblood, crippling their leader's war machine before he can escape. However, Blackblood has taken a child hostage, forcing Joe Pineapples to take the most difficult shot of his career to date: he has to hit Blackblood's 'heart' precisely while not harming the boy. Joe is successful, and Blackblood is captured, a disgusted Hammerstein left wondering what mission could be so important that a butcher like Blackblood has to become part of his team.

Steelhorn (2 episodes, Brendan McCarthy)

The Volgan War is over, the robot Steelhorn – made from almost indestructible materials – having killed the enemy leader, Marshal Volgow. However, when Steelhorn reports for decommissioning, he is betrayed by his own side. With the war over, the robot soldiers are no longer needed, and Steelhorn is dropped into a fusion furnace that even he cannot withstand. Instead of vaporising, he becomes 'The Mess' – an intelligence made from molten metal that is consumed with the desire for revenge against his betrayers. The Mess is stored in a flask (kept by Mongrol) that lets it stay molten, and the seventh ABC Warrior has been recruited, albeit in an unusual form.

Mars, The Devil Planet (1 episode, Mike McMahon)

Colonel Lash reveals the Warriors' secret mission – to travel to the colonised and terraformed planet Mars, where rival corporations are at war over resources, the civilians caught in the middle. They are to bring peace to the planet, by any means necessary.

Cyboons (2 episodes, Dave Gibbons)

Soya ranchers are driving the Cyboons – intelligent genetically altered apes used in the early days of terraforming – off their reservation to take over the land. The Warriors try to offer the apes assistance, but their leader Bedlam refuses their help. But when Bedlam's son is murdered by the ranchers, he leads his tribe into an attack. Since the ranchers are armed, it seems like a slaughter – but Deadlock and Blackblood had secretly infiltrated the ranchers' camp, disarming their guns. Without their weapons, the ranchers are helpless against the ferocity of the Cyboon attack, and after suffering heavy losses are quick to surrender and leave the Cyboons in peace.

The Red Death (2 episodes, Mike McMahon)

Called to deal with a ruthless biker gang terrorising Viking City, the Warriors seem to have an easy victory – until the frightened, fleeing bikers die almost instantly from a hideous flesh-rotting disease. The disease is native to Mars, and triggered by fear. Tracking the disease to its source, the Warriors find a young boy near a car containing the rotting corpses of his parents. Hammerstein is afraid that the boy will see their bodies, become frightened and die himself – and the disease begins to affect even his metal body. Deadlock reveals that the 'boy' actually is a manifestation of the Red Death, Mars itself trying to drive away the human settlers. Hammerstein kills the fake child, and the menace is over – for now.

Golgotha (3 episodes, Carlos Ezquerra)

A popular pastime among the ultra-rich youth of Mars is hunting – but instead of animals, they hunt people, while riding on the backs of genetically recreated Tyrannosaurs. The most feared of the dinosaurs is Golgotha, son of Satanus (the monstrous T-Rex that appeared during the 'Cursed Earth' storyline of Judge Dredd, who himself was the son of 'Old One Eye' from another 2000AD series, Flesh), and his sheer bloodlust allows him to overcome the control device meant to keep him in check and escape from the compound, leaving carnage in his wake. The Warriors arrive to hunt down the rogue dinosaur – and also to administer justice on Golgotha's owner. For his part in multiple murders, the sentence is death, which is duly carried out. However, the youth's father swears revenge on Hammerstein, and pays Blackblood to betray him. Tracking Golgotha to the city, Hammerstein prepares to kill the dinosaur, but his guns fail to fire and he is attacked. The robot is not defenceless, however, and uses his combat hammer to smash the dinosaur's skull. Mortally wounded, Golgotha plummets from a flyover and is impaled on a spire below. Hammerstein has no proof that Blackblood sabotaged his guns – but delivers a beating as a warning that if he ever suspects treachery again, he will kill him.

Mad George (3 episodes, Mike McMahon)

Features George, a giant, clumsy robot with five brains which disagree with each other. At the close of the story the liquid-metal Mess becomes the living metal 'blood' linking George's brains to create a more cohesive robot.

Red Planet Blues (2000AD 1985 annual, Steve Dillon and John Higgins (colours))

Written by Alan Moore, his only ABC Warriors story. The Warriors are hired by a farm owner to protect her land and workers from unknown attackers. During their tenure they establish that the attackers are Martian natives, angry at the farmers smallholding and intrusion on their planet. At the end of the story the farmer is missing, presumed killed, and Hammerstein buries a dead native discovered when searching for the farmer.

The ABC Warriors next returned to 2000AD as supporting characters in Nemesis the Warlock Books IV-VI. By the time they returned to starring status in 1988, the line-up comprised Hammerstein, Joe, Blackblood, Mongrol, Mek-Quake and Ro-Jaws.

=== The End of Time! ===
(21 episodes, Simon Bisley and SMS; also called "The Black Hole" in reprints)

Sent by Nemesis to stabilise the artificial black and white holes that allow interstellar travel (and enabled the Terran Empire to conquer the galaxy) before they collide and destroy Earth, the Warriors pick up a new member – Terri. Although human, she has been raised by the robots and androids guarding the black hole complex – the Mekaniks – and considers herself to be a robot, and Hammerstein to be her true love. Deadlock also returns to rejoin the Warriors, though Hammerstein is suspicious of his motives – the follower of Khaos has more to gain from Earth's destruction than its salvation.

As well as the Mekaniks, the Warriors must also face the soldiers of the Empire of this time period, led by the robot-hating Major Savard, as well as the ultimate evil – the Monad (which originally appeared in Nemesis the Warlock), a psychic monster formed from the distillation of all human evil that is able to take on any form.

The Warriors eventually fight their way to the control room, deep inside the tomb of Emperor Zallin, where Deadlock, Blackblood and Mek-Quake come under attack from automated defence systems. Hammerstein realises the truth – the defence systems scan robots to ensure that they are there to protect the tomb, and the three robots have been working to sabotage the mission and ensure Earth is destroyed. Hammerstein, Joe, Mongrol and Terri take on the renegades, but an unwilling truce is forced when Savard's troops – and the Monad, disguised in the form of Abaddon, an alien bounty hunter – attack. Deadlock uses his dark powers to reach the control room and stabilise the black and white holes, but not before the destruction wrought by the impending collision causes the death of Terri.

Deadlock then draws upon the centuries of horror and bloodshed the Warriors have experienced to create a psychic warrior powerful enough to defeat – but not destroy – the Monad. The Warriors then escape by stealing Zallin's tombship, taking the blame for the devastation and now the most wanted robots in the galaxy.

=== Khronicles of Khaos ===
(17 episodes, Kevin Walker)

On a mission to infect the Terran Empire with Khaos, Deadlock leads the ABC Warriors to the planet Hekate; here, they will kill seven figures of Order and harvest their heads as part of a ritual. As well as recruiting a new seventh member in Morrigun, the existing Warriors were altered by such close exposure to Khaos magick. Blackblood was able to become more vicious again, Joe was operated on to embrace cross-dressing, Mongrol became a true beast and even Hammerstein was influenced.

The Warriors undertake six assassinations in the run up to the lunar alignment known as the Night of the Blood Moon, as well as encountering the bizarre alien lifeforms on this world – the primal and Khaotic Night Mara, the Froyds who wander around at night acting out their brutal dreams, and the Phookas who vomit on people as a compliment. In the final battle went up against the Terran Imperial Rottweilers battalion and the reanimated Emperor Zalin. They succeeded in the end, bringing Khaos to the world (and a month-long party) and causing it to spread throughout the Empire. Due to its influence, the Warriors refused to follow Deadlock's orders – fully embracing Khaos in the process – and Deadlock returned to his Kollege with Ro-Jaws.

=== Hellbringer ===
(17 episodes, Kevin Walker)

Ten years have passed since the 'Hekate' mission, and the Terran Empire's control has crumbled as a result. The Warriors have gone their separate ways, but assemble once more when the Terrans unveil a new super-weapon designed to undo the Warriors' tide of Khaos – the Hellbringer.

=== The Third Element ===
The 'Third Element' saga was a story arc made up of five three-part stories. Medusa, the ancient planetary consciousness of Mars, has awoken, and by various means is attempting to purge the planet of the human colonists who are terraforming her. The Warriors return to Mars to 'Increase the Peace' during the so-called Medusa War.

Roadkill (1 episode, Kevin Walker)

A short one-off 'bridge' story in the special 'Prog 2000' issue, to re-introduce the Warriors for the new century. Zombie bikers are terrorising the Martian highways, and only the Warriors can defeat them.

The Third Element (3 episodes, Henry Flint)

The Warriors intervene when Terran Biohazard troops attempt to ethnically cleanse the population of a Martian ghetto. Morrigun is destroyed in combat, and Mongrol's original personality is rebooted when the Warriors are forced to relocate their brains into new bodies during the battle, turning him from a growling simpleton to a tough-talking, cigar-smoking soldier.

The Clone Cowboys (3 episodes, Liam McCormack-Sharpe)

The Warriors arrive at the Martian town of Redemption to investigate the disappearance of its inhabitants. They are ambushed by cloned copies of the humans, which turn into hideous mutants as they strike. An army of Medusa's clones emerge from the town's church, using its bell to create massive sonic vibrations that threaten to destroy the Warriors' brains and literally shake their bodies apart. However, Mek-Quake is immune (thanks to the small size of his brain) and loads up his killdozer body with explosives, ploughing into the church and blowing it – and the clones – to pieces just after he bails out in his secondary body. Victorious, the Warriors depart – but are watched by a mysterious horned figure from a hilltop.

The Tripods (3 episodes, Mike McMahon)

Taking inspiration from H. G. Wells' The War of the Worlds, Medusa next creates an army of tripods which invade Viking City and begin to massacre the population. The Warriors intervene and battle the tripods, but are stunned when the leader of the army is revealed – their old comrade Steelhorn, left behind on Mars centuries ago. Medusa destroyed Mad George for the crime of terraforming her, and found the Mess in the remains. Decoding his memories from the molten metal, she cast a new body for him from special martian alloys and Steelhorn was reborn, now as a crusader committed to fighting for Martian freedom. The battle reaches an impasse, and the Warriors realise that while the fighting raged the entire population of Viking City has been killed by a specially created Martian virus, just as the Martians were killed by Earth bacteria in The War of the Worlds. The Warriors reluctantly retreat, vowing a reckoning with Steelhorn.

The Zero Option (3 episodes, Boo Cook)

At a remote arctic base, the Warriors battle to stop the release of a bomb that will destroy Medusa utterly. During the battle, Steelhorn attacks again and President Cobb betrays the team in hopes of wiping them out for good.

Assault on the Red House (3 episodes, Henry Flint)

The Warriors take the battle to Mars President Cobb, but the electronic viruses that Medusa has been plaguing robotkind with begin to take their toll. One by one, the Warriors fall, and after escaping with the President the survivors are forced to bargain with Steelhorn. Deadlock suggests a compromise that will satisfy Medusa, Martiankind and Human alike – Cobb can stay in charge, but only after certain modifications have been made – the addition of an extra arm, eye and leg to make him a trinary being like other Martians. Thus appeased, Medusa calls off her attacks and returns to her deep slumber – the fallen Warriors are reactivated, and Steelhorn rejoins the team to help enforce the new peace.

=== The Medusa Wars ===
The Medusa Wars is an original novel written by Pat Mills and Alan Mitchell. Although there are questions about its "canonicity", it introduces a number of pieces of information by the series comic strip's creators, most of which have yet to be contradicted.

The novel tells of the events leading up to the Warriors' return to Mars and retells the story of The Third Element strip. It introduces the troubled marriage of Senator Diaz and Juanita Perez, and we see the latter's relationship with Joe Pineapples develop. We are also witness to the disagreements between President Cobb and Senator Diaz, which lead to civil war. These elements are picked up in the following comic strip, The Shadow Warriors. By placing Roadkill after The Third Element, the novel contradicts the strip. In the comic, Morrigun appears in Roadkill and is killed in The Third Element. In the novel, she dies and then the events of Roadkill are said to have happened (without Morrigun's appearance).

Mills has said of the novel: "Parts are dramatisations of the comic strip. Notably the Biohazard troopers because they originally had excellent funky black dialogue contributed by my black co-writer on the novel, Alan Mitchell. This was altered at the time by 2000AD editorial without my knowledge and in an inappropriate and uncool way. It made my toes curl it was so wrong. So, I thought it was important to put it back the way it should be. I think the text version is much better. Although having said that, I'm sure some perverse fan is now going to say he preferred the comic version. In which case, my response would be I'm sure you enjoy McDonalds burgers, too."

=== The Shadow Warriors ===
Book I (6 episodes, Carlos Ezquerra)

Following the conclusion of the 'Return To Mars' arc, civil war has broken out on the Red Planet. The human population has divided into the Union and the Confederacy. Recognising the threat the ABC Warriors pose to their plans for global domination, the leaders of the Confederacy hire Conflict Management – a company of 'privatised peacekeepers' – to recruit the Shadow Warriors, a team of robots chosen specifically for their abilities to overcome each member of the Warriors.

The first members of the Shadow Warriors to be revealed are Bootleg, a robotic bounty hunter; Dog-Tag, a charming yet ruthless 'pirate' of the trans-Martian highways; The Rev, a minister in the sinister robot religion of the Church of Judas, which Blackblood now follows; and Deus Ex Machina, an artificial intelligence – long thought mythical – capable of taking control of other machines and turning them to its will.

The story opens with Joe severely damaging Dog-Tag and wiping out his gang. The ABC Warriors discover a plot against them and engage Confederacy Behemeks alongside Union forces at Getty City. While Deus Ex Machina sabotages Union gun positions, the Rev attempts to assassinate Deadlock. The ABC Warriors head for New Sidona.

Book II (6 episodes, Henry Flint)

The Warriors reach New Sidona, where anarchy is breaking out as people wonder whether the Union or Confederacy will get there first. The robots drive off looting Cyboons before encountering a Talk Cone – a low-level robot agent of the Total Information Awareness agency that enforces the 'no talking' rule the government requires to monitor the populace for thoughts of terrorism. However, the cone has been booby-trapped with a bomb by Deux Ex, so the Warriors have to act quickly to save a loud group of teenagers from the explosion.

Taking the teenagers and fending off more Cyboons, the Warriors encounter the next Shadow Warrior – Doctor Maniacus, a rogue paramedic droid who feeds off the pain of his human 'patients' as he tortures and kills them. The psychotic medic unleashes the pain he has absorbed to overload the emotional circuits of the Warriors – however, Deadlock, having witnessed horrors beyond imagination in the service of Khaos, is immune. Doc Maniacus is able to fight off the Grand Wizard in single combat, but Deadlock plants a "nanobat" – a microscopic bug – on him before he escapes. Meanwhile, sixth Shadow Warrior is revealed to be the sadistic and manipulative Mr Lovebomb, attacks New Sidona with his army of mind-shattered military clones (which undergo psychological torments to produce the adrenaline for military drug Neuropeptide-A).

The Warriors reach Terrasand Square, causing Mayor/Sheriff/TIA Chief Terrasand to hurriedly switch his allegiance from the Confederacy to the Union. It turns out the Square is a trap as the Warriors are attacked from all sides by Lovebomb's clones and Deus Ex' cone-bombs. The Warriors try to protect the humans and fight off the clones, while their Shadow counterparts – joined by their final member, the state-of-the-art killing machine Warmonger – prepare their attack...

Book III (10 episodes, Henry Flint)

The Shadows attack with state-of-the-art weaponry that is far superior to anything the ABC Warriors have in their arsenal. Steelhorn is the first to fall, reduced to molten slag by Doc Maniacus's 'sledgehammer' shells and trickling into a drain. Joe Pineapples attempts to snipe the Shadows but is caught unawares, shot in the head and buried by Dog-Tag. Realising they are outmatched, the Warriors and the humans they are protecting take shelter in the police precinct and prepare for a long siege.

Over the course of a long and protracted battle various Shadows and Warriors fall. Mek-Quake, his already unstable mind affected earlier by Mr Lovebomb's heartbreaker bullets, seems increasingly unhinged. Deadlock locks himself away performing mysterious and sinister rituals on captured Confederate soldiers, refusing to be disturbed. Eventually the Warriors are forced by the imminent arrival of Confederate tanks into the open to face the remaining Shadows. Hammerstein decapitate Maniacus while Blackblood tackles the Rev. Mongrol tears Warmonger apart in a rage when makes the mistake of disparaging Lara. Dog Tag is hit and fatally wounded by his own bullets as it is revealed Joe Pineapples only faked his electronic death, allowing him to loot the Shadows' arsenal.

Just as it seems the ABC Warriors have prevailed, Bootleg leads the Confederate Behemeks in demolishing buildings and crushing the ABCs into the ground. However, now the purpose of Deadlock's ritual becomes clear – he has bargained with Medusa for Steelhorn's return, this time in a new, impervious diamond-bodied form. Steelhorn wipes out the remaining enemy resistance and the other ABCs join in the attack with the aid of newly arrived Union forces. The Confederate troops are destroyed, and the battered ABC Warriors are victorious.

=== The Volgan War ===
Volume I (9 episodes, Clint Langley)

The Warriors arrive at Broadband Asylum on Mars, a mental hospital for robots, to check in Mek-Quake for treatment. He hopefully asks that his place in the team be kept open for him, but after they leave him, the other Warriors make it clear they have no intention of taking him back. Only Hammerstein is bothered by the betrayal, while Blackblood positively revels in it.

Travelling to Marineris City to recruit a new member, the robots reminisce about their experiences in the Volgan War. Hammerstein tells of a battle against the fearsome Stalins, colossal war robots. Mongrol describes how his existence as a robo-paratrooper was ended by a faulty parachute, and his rebuilding by Lara – before she was murdered by Volgan forces for harbouring him. Joe, meanwhile, recalls an assassination mission where he was sent undercover to Moscow to destroy the 'Ikon', leader of the Volgan robotic forces: the fearsome Volkhan.

As the stories progress, it is revealed that all of the Warriors encountered Volkhan in their battles – as well as a Special Forces ABC robot called Zippo, who it becomes clear is going to become the latest member of the Warriors. Back at Broadband Asylum, Mek-Quake makes an unexpected discovery – one of the other inmates is none other than Volkhan himself...

Volume II (10 episodes, Clint Langley)

Volkhan tries to convince Mek-Quake to help him escape, but he refuses. That is, until he receives a call from Blackblood, who gloatingly informs him – "as a friend" – that his position in the ABC Warriors has been taken by Zippo. Dismayed and enraged, Mek-Quake makes a fateful decision...

Still travelling, the other Warriors continue their war memoirs. Blackblood takes glee in describing how he was the one responsible for the murder of Lara's parents, which prompts a furious Mongrol to issue an ultimatum – when the mission is completed, either Blackblood leaves the Warriors, or he does. Next, Deadlock relates his encounter with Volkhan, and his destruction of his 'son' Kalevala. Knowing that killing or imprisoning the Ikon will turn him into a martyr, Deadlock instead 'operates' on Volkhan to prevent him from creating any more offspring – essentially castrating him.

As the Warriors arrive at Marineris to find and rescue Zippo, at Broadband Asylum Mek-Quake kills the guards and frees Volkhan and his comrades. As a reward, Volkhan promises the former demolition droid the chance to carry out "the biggest job on Mars."

Volume III (10 episodes, Clint Langley)

Steelhorn recalls his war memoirs, explaining how he was viewed a modern-day knight by the west, and a war criminal by the Volgans. Volgan agents (Non other than Volkhan and Blackblood) plant a virus into Steelhorn while he slept, that caused Steelhorn to believe he was Volkhans slain son Kal, and proceeded to decimate the western frontlines and the civilian population. Hammerstein witnesses the carnage, losing his legs and his comrades to Steelhorns vortex hammer. Zippo arrives and proceeds to fight Steelhorn, eventually being able to plant an anti-virus which restores Steelhorn, who flees in shame. Horrified by his actions in the war, Steelhorn moves to a de-mobilization centre for reassignment, only to be thrown into a fusion furnace, sparking his hatred of humanity and his transformation into the mess.

Zippo now awaiting execution, recalls the events leading to this situation. Prior to his capture, Zippo sprayed anti-government graffiti across the city and dealt with the oppressive police force when required. Zippo meets with his mentor "Kroll", and discovers that Kroll is being manipulated by Medusa into defacing the city as punishment for creating it. Detective inspector Sturn arrives with a squad of "G men", killing Kroll and capturing Zippo, bringing him to the police headquarters "Der Kran". Resisting interrogation, Zippo is sentenced to execution.

Meanwhile, Blackblood leaves the warriors and links up with Volkhan and Mek-quake on the martian highway. Volkhan has now assembled a team of loyal servants each with a personal score to settle with the warriors, and gifts Mek-quake with an industrial mobile excavator. They now proceed towards Marineris city obliterating everything in their path.

Volume IV (12 episodes, Clint Langley)

The Warriors succeed in rescuing Zippo despite Blackblood's disappearance, delivering him to his ally "Urban Fox" who turns out to be Ro-jaws. Volkhan's approach towards the city leads to a massive uprising of the city's droids, forcing the Warriors to attack Der Kran to force a truce onto the G-men so that they can deal with Volkhan. After fighting through Volkhan's crazed robot hoards, the Warriors engage Blackblood onboard Mek-Quake's excavator. Blackblood gleefully reveals that he has supplied volkhans troops with information on their weaknesses, and has calibrated their weapons to exploit them.

Sustaining severe injuries, Steelhorn retrieves the vortex hammer from the museum of war, while Ro-jaws leads Mek-Quake away from the warriors by insulting his imaginary mother, much to Blackblood's annoyance. The Warriors escape while Volkhan leads his forces on the red house. President Diaz, who has been brainwashing Joe Pineapples' former lover Juanita into sleeping with him, orders Sturn to execute the Warriors once they have defeated Volkhan, but instead chooses to evacuate once he hears of the Warriors impending defeat. Juanita, hearing Joe's name, remembers her love for him and undoes Diaz's brainwashing. Diaz attempts to kill Juanita, but Joe arrives and kills Diaz, saving Juanita as the red house is overrun by Volkhan's forces.

Steelhorn returns with the vortex hammer, destroying Volkhan's forces with the hammer. Sensing defeat, Volkhan and Blackblood escape while leaving Mek-quake to perish, vowing vengeance. Mek-Quake escapes the excavator via an ejector seat as it is destroyed by the vortex hammer. Immediately after Volkhan's defeat, the G-men attack and prepare to finish off the Warriors. Zippo returns, with upgraded armour and leads a successful counterattack, driving the G-men back to Der Kran.

Months later, the Warriors prepare to leave to recruit a new member to fill Blackbloods vacancy. Mek-Quake is found to be publicising his book tour in union territory, while Juanita leaves Joe, needing time to recover from Diaz's brainwashing. As they leave with their newest member (Zippo), Joe reads a thought mail from Blackblood, promising retribution for his defeat.

=== Return to Earth ===
(12 episodes, Clint Langley) While attempting to meet with their mysterious armorer Tubal Caine, the Warriors vessel crashes from volcanic ash being sucked into the engine. Initially suspecting Volkhan, they are immediately attacked by tripods upon landing. While certain that this aggression is the work of the planetary consciousness Medusa, her motivations for attacking them remain a mystery. While fixing the engines, Hammerstein reveals his reluctance to return to Earth, revealing what happened prior to him joining Ro-busters.

Hammerstein's last journey to earth saw him trying to inform fellow ABC warriors of their future, that they would be recycled instead of being reprogrammed. Despite initial resistance, the warriors eventually believed him and fought their way out of the recycling compound. With the authorities after him, Hammerstein hid at a war memorial, pretending to be part of the memorial via a paint job and an immobiliser. However, the FBI tracked him down and attempted to destroy him, with Hammerstein unable to move. Hammerstein invoked the forces of khaos (Which Deadlock would take credit for) and de-activated the immobiliser and went on the offensive. The other ABC warriors which were part of the memorial also re-activated and aided Hammersteins escape, sacrificing themselves to help him.

Meeting in DC with his UN contact, Hammerstein was briefed on his mission. The UN had made a move to completely remove war altogether and install a new method of dealing with conflict, but the Quartz controlled White House was vetoing the vote. Hammerstein's mission was to kill the president, so the vote would swing in the UN's favour. Infiltrating the White House, Hammerstein overcame the secret service and the Hammerstein mk IVs and encountered President Dick Quartz in the oval office. In order to kill him, Hammerstein had to get his ethical conductor, the software which gauges hostile targets to identify Quartz as an enemy. Hammerstein succeeded in getting Quartz to admit to various war crimes committed by the US in the Volgan war, his ethical conductor allowing Hammerstein to kill him. Hammerstein is then greeted by Howard Quartz, who displays little emotion for the death of his nephew. Hammerstein attempts to kill Quartz, but Quartz gleefully reveals that all his machines have a prime directive that prevents them from killing him. Hammerstein escapes and is given a new head by his UN contact, and then placed in a robot emporium, where he would meet Ro-Jaws. While in the emporium, Hammerstein learns that the UN vote was carried, with his UN contact revealed to be an African ambassador, successfully beats Great Britain in trade negotiations via the new method. This new method turns out to be one-on-one armed combat.

Hammerstein's story then ends with him and Ro-Jaws reporting to Mek-Quake for destruction, but being recruited into Ro-Busters at the last moment, his new head preventing Quartz from identifying him.

With the ship repaired, the warriors depart and meet their mechanic Tubal caine, who Hammerstein reveals is in fact Happy Shrapnel.

=== Return To Mars ===
(12 episodes, Clint Langley) This story fills in a lot of the missing backstory of the Warriors since their return to Mars – revealing that their armourer Tubal is former teammate Happy Shrapnel, inadvertently resurrected from the grave hundreds of years after his death by Medusa, when she first woke. Seeing first-hand the chaos being wrought by Medusa's plagues of zombies and martians, Happy sent a call out into the universe for the other Warriors, who felt compelled to fulfil their primary directive and return to the Red Planet to restore peace. Happy declined to join them on their return, instead renouncing warfare for the simpler life of a mechanic, and rejecting his 'slave name' in favour of Tubal Caine. After the Warriors' many subsequent battles, it was he who patched them up.

In the time that followed his life as a mechanic, Tubal adopted a humpy son named Tom, who resembled a human unlike his humpy family. Tom was in the throes of being executed for heresy when tubal saved him, his crime being that Tom had proven that martian food and plant life was not toxic, but in fact increased a humans physical attributes, a belief that conflicted with Humpy traditions. Tubal was later approached by Howard Quartz with his new bodyguard, Mek-Quake. Quartz explained that he wanted Tubal to terminate Volkhan. Refusing to work for Quartz, Quartz activated the scrap robots in his scrapyard which immediately attacked Tubal. Sustaining severe injuries, Tubal fended off the machines but came under attack from Mek-Quake, who eventually succeeded in tearing off Tubal's head. In an attempt to save Tubal, Tom opened fire on Mek-Quake, but his weapon jammed, allowing Mek-Quake to murder him. The sustained damage and the shock of seeing his son murdered caused Tubal to suffer a system crash, which Quartz had intended.

Upon re-activation and re-attaching his head, Tubal was restored to default status, becoming Happy Shrapnel again and no longer a pacifist. Seeing the crime Quartz committed, and receiving news that Quartz was supplying both factions in the martian civil war, the warriors agree that there never can truly be peace on mars as long as Quartz lives. With Happy Shrapnel part of the warriors, the team sets out to kill Quartz. in order to overcome their prime directive which prohibits this, Hammerstein suggests they find Ro-Jaws, the only machine to ever show signs of being able to negate the prime directive.

== Chronology ==
Although no dates were specified at the time, the 2006–07 series The Volgan War explicitly places that conflict in 2082–84, with the invasion of Western Europe in 1999 (from Invasion!) as backstory and considered to be World War III in the ABC timeline. This retcons out the Judge Dredd strip Hammerstein, which placed the ABC Warriors in Dredd's universe and showed Hammerstein involved in 2071's Battle of Armageddon after the Volgan War and the Mars mission.

After the Volgan War, the Warriors take part in the original Mars mission and subsequently disband. Hammerstein ends up back on Earth and ultimately joins Ro-Busters.

The adventures of the ABC Warriors in Nemesis Books 3 to 6 take place "thousands" of years later, with Earth having since become Termight, a quasi-mediaeval future society where the knowledge for making robots belongs to the Lost Age of Science. All robots who have lived thus far have become antiquated relics, forced to salvage spare parts from fallen colleagues to survive. Book 6 sees them travel forward billions of years in time to the end of the earth, where they first encounter the Monad. When the Warriors part company with Nemesis in Book 6, they travel back in time (via the time-tubes) to a period slightly prior to Termight – the Terran Empire, a much more technologically orientated society – for their remaining post-Nemesis adventures.

Several centuries have passed since their original mission on Mars by the time they return to the Red Planet for The Third Element arc and all subsequent stories. The Biol corporation is still a major player and Mars' civilisation is largely the same, though enough time has passed for some Martian races, such as the Humpies and Cyboons, to degenerate to a lower state of being. The ABC warriors' original Mars mission has passed into near-legendary status, with most believing the warriors to be long since dead prior their return. A character in Return To Mars mentions having been taught about their adventures in school.

== Bibliography ==
=== Publication history ===
- The Meknificent Seven (176 pages, Simon & Schuster, 2010, ISBN 978-1-906735-90-6)
  - "ABC Warriors" (with Kevin O'Neill, in 2000 AD No. 119, 1979)
  - "The Retreat from Volgow" (with Kevin O'Neill, in 2000 AD No. 120, 1979)
  - "Mongrol" (with Mike McMahon, in 2000 AD #121–122, 1979)
  - "The Order of Knights Martial" (with Kevin O'Neill (1) and Brett Ewins (2), in 2000 AD #123–124, 1979)
  - "The Bougainville Massacre" (with Mike McMahon, in 2000 AD #125–126, 1979)
  - "Steelhorn" (with Brendan McCarthy, in 2000 AD #127–128, 1979)
  - "Mars, the Devil Planet" (with Mike McMahon, in 2000 AD No. 129, 1979)
  - "Cyboons" (with Dave Gibbons, in 2000 AD #130–131, 1979)
  - "The Red Death" (with Mike McMahon, in 2000 AD #132–133, 1979)
  - "Golgotha" (with Carlos Ezquerra, in 2000 AD #134–136, 1979)
  - "Mad George" (with Mike McMahon, in 2000 AD #137–139, 1979)
  - "Red Planet Blues" (short story, written by Alan Moore, with art by Steve Dillon, in 2000AD Annual 1985, 1984)
- The Black Hole (144 pages, Simon & Schuster, 2011, ISBN 978-1-907519-92-5)
  - "The Black Hole" (with Simon Bisley (1–4, 9–12, 17–21) and SMS (5–8, 13–16), in 2000 AD #555–566 & 573–581, 1988)
  - "Volgow the Ultimate Death Machine" (with Steve Dillon, Diceman #2)
- Khronicles of Khaos (112 pages, Rebellion Developments, April 2007, ISBN 1-904265-49-9)
  - "Khronicles of Khaos" (with co-author Tony Skinner, and art by Kev Walker, in 2000 AD #750–757, 780–84 & 787–790, 1991 and 1992)
- Hellbringer (112 pages, Rebellion Developments, February 2008, ISBN 1-905437-56-0)
  - "Hellbringer" (with co-author Tony Skinner, and art by Kev Walker, in 2000 AD #904–911, 964–971, 1994 and 1995)
- The Third Element ( Rebellion Developments, 2008, ISBN 978-1-905437-80-1)
  - "Roadkill" (with Kev Walker, in 2000 AD Prog 2000, 1999)
  - "The Third Element " (with Henry Flint, in 2000 AD #1234–1236, 2001)
  - "The Clone Cowboys" (with Liam Sharp, in 2000 AD #1237–1239, 2001)
  - "The Tripods" (with Mike McMahon, in 2000 AD #1240–1242, 2001)
  - "The Zero Option" (with Boo Cook, in 2000 AD #1243–1245, 2001)
  - "Assault on the Red House" (with Henry Flint, in 2000 AD #1246–1248, 2001)
- The Shadow Warriors (Rebellion Developments, 2009, ISBN 978-1-905437-94-8)
  - "The Shadow Warriors Book I" (with Carlos Ezquerra, in 2000 AD #1336–1341, 2003)
  - "The Shadow Warriors Book II" (with Henry Flint, in 2000 AD #1400–1405, 2004)
  - "The Shadow Warriors Book III" (with Henry Flint, in 2000 AD #1476–1485, 2006)
- The Volgan War Volume 1 (Rebellion Developments, 2009, ISBN 978-1-906735-02-9)
  - "The Volgan War Vol. 1" (with Clint Langley, in 2000 AD Prog 2007and #1518–1525, 2007)
- The Volgan War Volume 2 (Rebellion Developments, 2010, ISBN 978-1-906735-23-4)
  - "The Volgan War Vol. 2" (with Clint Langley, in 2000 AD #1550–1559, 2007)
- The Volgan War Vol. 3 (Rebellion Developments, 2010, ISBN 978-1-906735-45-6)
  - "The Volgan War Vol. 3" (with Clint Langley, in 2000 AD #1601–1606, 1611–1616, 2008)
- The Volgan War Vol. 4 (Rebellion Developments, 2011, ISBN 978-1-907992-19-3)
  - "The Volgan War Vol. 4" (with Clint Langley, in 2000 AD #1666–1677, 2010)
- Return to Earth (Rebellion Developments, 2013, ISBN 978-1-781081-44-0)
  - "Return to Earth" (with Clint Langley, in 2000 AD #1800–1811, 2012)
- Return to Mars (Rebellion Developments, 2015, ISBN 978-1-781083-43-7)
  - "Return to Mars" (with Clint Langley, in 2000 AD Prog 2014 and #1862-1866, 1868–1873, 2013–14)
- Return to Ro-busters (Rebellion Developments, 2016, ISBN 978-1-781084-43-4)
  - "Return to Ro-busters" (with Clint Langley, in 2000 AD #1961-1972, 2016)
- "Blackblood: General Public" (with Kei Zama, in 2000 AD Free Comic Book Day 2017 issue)
- "Fallout" (with Clint Langley, in 2000 AD #2061-2072, 2017–2018)
- "Joe Pineapples: Tin Man" (with Simon Bisley and Clint Langley, in 2000 AD #2312–2322, 2022–2023)

==== Other collections ====
In 2014, special appearances were collected into a trade paperback:

- Solo Missions (Rebellion Developments, 2014, ISBN 978-1-781082-26-3)
  - "Red Planet Blues" (featuring Hammerstein, written by Alan Moore, with art by Steve Dillon & John Higgins, in 2000AD Annual 1985, 1984)
  - "Dishonourable Discharge" (featuring Blackblood, with Kev Walker, in 2000 AD Winter Special No. 4, 1992)
  - "Joe Pineapples – His Greatest Hits" (with Tom Carney, in 2000 AD 1996 Sci-Fi Special)
  - "Deadlock" (with Henry Flint, in 2000 AD #1212–1222, 2000)

In 2013, an announcement was made for all of the older stories to be reprinted in new, collectable hard-back books through 2014.

- The Mek Files 01 (Rebellion Developments, May 2014, ISBN 978-1-78108-258-4)
  - Containing all the work from "The Meknificent Seven" and "The Black Hole" books, plus bonus material.
- The Mek Files 02 (Rebellion Developments, September 2014, ISBN 978-1-78108-259-1)
  - Containing all the work from "Kronicles of Khaos" and "Hellbringer" books, plus bonus material.
- The Mek Files 03 (Rebellion Developments, December 2015, ISBN 978-1-78108-334-5)
  - Containing all the work from "The Third Element" and "Shadow Warriors" books, plus bonus material.
- The Mek Files 04 (Rebellion Developments, March 2018, ISBN 978-1-78108-623-0)
  - Containing all the work from "The Volgan War" Volumes 1 and 2.

==== Appearances in other series ====
- Nemesis the Warlock (by Pat Mills and Bryan Talbot):
  - "The Gothic Empire" (Book IV) (in 2000 AD #387–406, 1984–1985)
  - "The Vengeance of Thoth" (Book V) (in 2000 AD #435–445, 1985)
  - "Torquemurder" (Book VI) (in 2000 AD #482–487, 500–504, 1986–1987)
- Nemesis and Deadlock
  - "Warlocks & Wizards" (with Carl Critchlow, in 2000 AD No. 700, 1990)
  - "The Enigmass Variations" (with Carl Critchlow, in 2000 AD #723–729, 1990)
- Judge Dredd
  - "Hammerstein" (by Pat Mills and Jason Brashill, in 2000 AD #960–963, 1995)

=== Novels ===
Black Flame has published two novels based on the characters:

- The Medusa War (Pat Mills and Alan Mitchell, April 2004 ISBN 1-84416-109-9)
- Rage Against the Machines (Mike Wild, June 2005 ISBN 1-84416-178-1)

== See also ==
- List of fictional robots and androids
