= The Last American (comics) =

1990 comic by John Wagner, Alan Grant and Mike McMahon

- The Last American issue #3 cover by Mike McMahon 1991.

Publication information
- Publisher: Epic Comics
- Schedule: Monthly
- Format: Mini-series
- Genre: Post-apocalyptic
- Publication date: December 1990 - March 1991
- No. of issues: 4

Creative team
- Created by: John Wagner; Alan Grant; Mike McMahon
- Written by: John Wagner; Alan Grant
- Artist: Mike McMahon

The Last American is a four-issue comic book mini-series published by Marvel's Epic imprint in 1990. It was written by John Wagner and Alan Grant with art by Mike McMahon.

== Synopsis ==
Twenty years after a global nuclear conflict, one man, Ulysses S. Pilgrim, is released from suspended animation to see what remains. It is unclear why nuclear war occurred or who started it but the devastation is immense. The protagonist is joined by three robot companions who accompany him on his journey to discover if he is, in fact, the last American alive.

== History ==
John Wagner wrote the first two parts and Alan Grant the last two. Grant has said that this was done because it could not have been done any other way: "Together with Chopper in "Oz", it brought the crisis in John's and my partnership to a crescendo". He also concluded: "The only time we ever did alternate episodes was on Last American, when our partnership was teetering on its last legs anyway. If we hadn't done it that way, it still wouldn't have been published today, we argued so much about it". The series was collected by Com.x as a trade paperback in 2004 and by Rebellion in 2017.

== Awards ==
- 1991: Nominated for the "Best Finite Series" Eisner Award
