= Planetary consciousness =

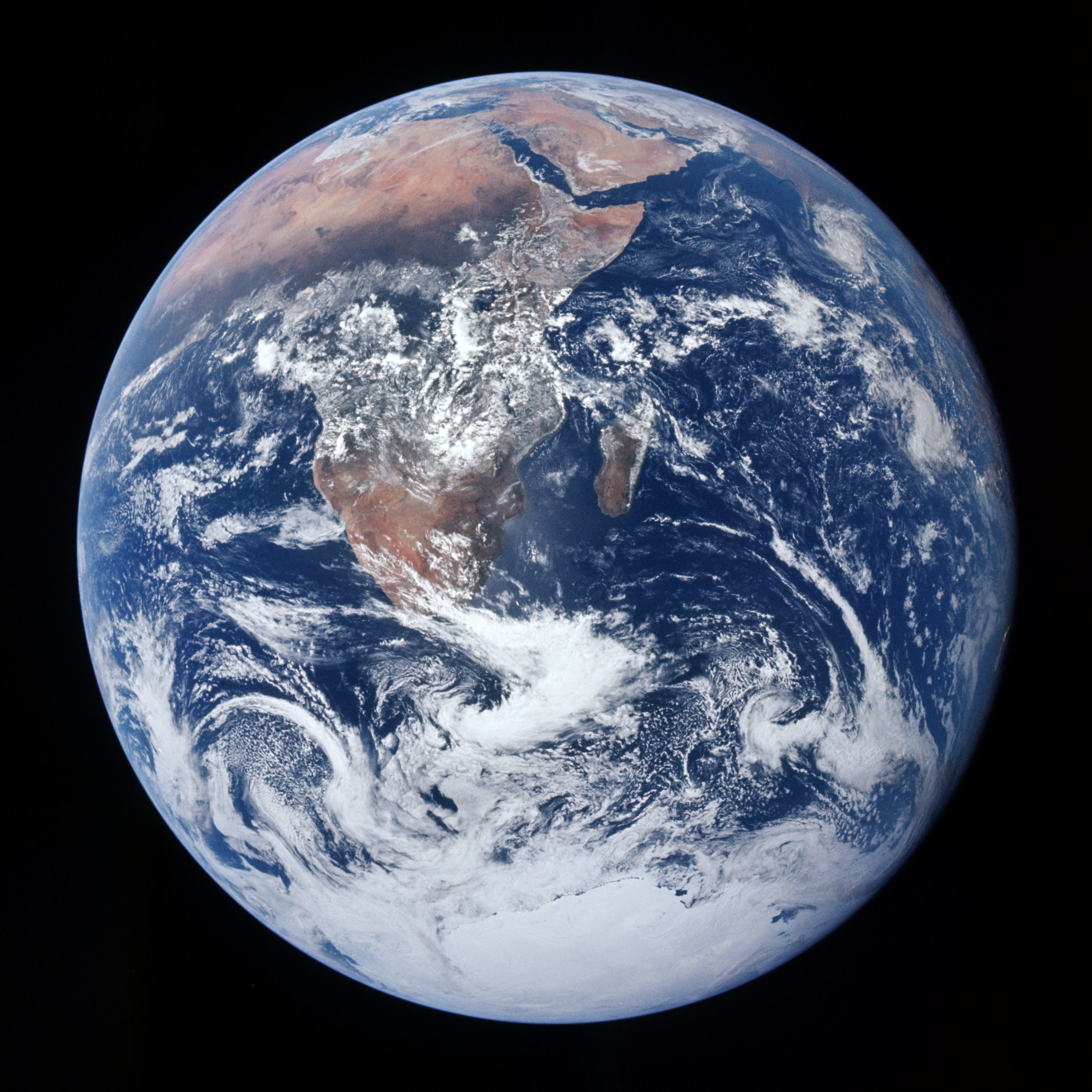
The Earth Seen from Apollo 17

Planetary consciousness is the idea that human beings are members of a planetary society of Earth as much as they are members of their nations, provinces, districts, islands, cities or villages.

== History ==
In his 1906 book American Character, author Brander Matthews mentions the idea of a "league of nations" and a "planetary consciousness", believing it would be created by American politicians in the coming centuries. Key planetary consciousness events of the 20th century include the creation of the League of Nations, the signing of Kellogg-Briand Pact, the creation of the United Nations, and the creation of the Bretton Woods system. Democratic globalization advocate Abhay Kumar points to the International Corporation of Assigned Names and Numbers (ICANN) board of directors election in 2000, which were conducted globally, as the first example of global democracy. In September 2001, Ervin László and the Dalai Lama wrote an essay titled "Manifesto on Planetary Consciousness", which was adopted at a meeting at the Hungarian Academy of Sciences in Budapest. Its introduction begins:

In the closing years of the twentieth century, we have reached a crucial juncture in our history. We are on the threshold of a new stage of social, spiritual, and cultural evolution, a stage that is as different from the stage of the earlier decades of this century as the grasslands were from the caves, and settled villages from life in nomadic tribes. We are evolving out of the nationally based industrial societies that were created at the dawn of the first industrial revolution, and heading toward an interconnected, information-based social, economic, and cultural system that straddles the globe.

Andreas Bummel, CEO of the Committee for a Democratic UN, says, "The first step into the direction of a world parliament would be the establishment of a Parliamentary Assembly at the United Nations".

== Concept ==
Advocacy for the idea of planetary consciousness is based on the technological advancements made by the mankind in the fields of transport and telecommunications during the 20th century and in the first decade of the 21st century. Kumar claims that these technological advancements have turned the whole planet into an interdependent economic, political and communication community. He specifically cites the invention of the Internet and the mobile phones as key technological achievements of the 20th century which brought humans into more continuous interconnected communication. He believes that these inventions will lead to a second Renaissance and global democracy, just as the Gutenberg press in 1439 led to the first Renaissance, the Age of Enlightenment, and Nation states. Bummel describes planetary consciousness as integral, insofar as it does not conflict with other levels of social identity, but instead is a holistic perspective on humanity and the planet as a whole. Steven Kull writes that while nation states are reluctant to work cooperatively, individuals seem more willing.

Author Shashi Tharoor argues that an Earth Anthem sung by people across the world can inspire planetary consciousness and global citizenship among people.

== See also ==
- Earth Anthem
- Global citizenship
- Oneness of humanity (Baháʼí)
