= SMS (illustrator) =

- Area: Artist

SMS is a Lancashire-based artist known for his award-winning covers for science-fiction magazine, Interzone, and for his work for British anthology magazine 2000 AD.

== Biography ==
He has drawn for comics including Oddmags, 2000 AD, Arcane, Games Workshop and Marvel Comics (both UK and US editions). He has also produced illustrations and covers for books including Keith Roberts' Kerosina, and works for Penguin Books, Games Workshop and other publishers.

== Awards ==
SMS won the Ken MacIntyre award (voted by the Eastercon, the British National Science Fiction Convention) in 1989 and the 1997 BSFA Art award in 1998.

== Bibliography ==
Comics work includes:

- Captain Airstrip One (inks/letters, with writer Alan Moore, and pencils by Chris Brasted, in Mad Dog #10, 1985)
- ABC Warriors: "The Black Hole" (with Pat Mills, in 2000 AD #559-562 & 573–576, 1988, collected in Black Hole, 2002, ISBN 1-84023-529-2)
- "Fragments" (pencils, with writer Neil Gaiman, in Redfox #20, Valkyrie Press, June 1989)
- "Original Sin" (with Ron Wolfe, in Hellraiser #6, Epic Comics, 1990)
- Heart of Empire #2-3, 7, 9 (inks, with script and pencils by Bryan Talbot, Dark Horse Comics, 1999)

Children's picture book "If I had a Dog", 2012
