= Mike McMahon (comics) =

British comics artist (born 1954)

- Born: Michael McMahon; January 23, 1954 (age 72)
- Areas: Penciller, Inker
- Pseudonym: Mick McMahon
- Notable works: Judge Dredd; Sláine; ABC Warriors; The Last American

Michael McMahon (/məkˈmɑːn/ mək-MAHN; born 1954) is a British comics artist best known for his work on 2000 AD characters such as Judge Dredd, Sláine and ABC Warriors, and the mini-series The Last American.

His influences include Víctor de la Fuente, Hugo Pratt, Gino d'Antonio, Don Lawrence, Joe Colquhoun and Harvey Kurtzman.

McMahon's illustration of Judge Dredd from 2000 AD prog 2, (1977) shows his early style, influenced by Carlos Ezquerra.

Sláine, 2000 AD prog 336 (1983).

== Career ==
Judge Dredd was created for IPC's new science fiction comic 2000 AD in 1977 by writer John Wagner and artist Carlos Ezquerra, but problems in pre-publication led to both creators walking out, and the first published story was written by Peter Harris and Pat Mills, and drawn by an inexperienced young artist called Mike McMahon. Mills, who was editor at the time, chose McMahon because he could do a passable imitation of Ezquerra's style, but the more he drew the more his own style emerged. When Wagner returned to his creation, McMahon became the character's most regular artist. Other artists, such as Ian Gibson and Brian Bolland, followed his lead, putting their own spin on the way McMahon was developing the character and his world.

McMahon's early work was characterised by a quick, spontaneous approach that verged on the messy. His figures were lean and loose, his pen lines thrown down with verve and energy, and hatching was done with a fully charged brush. He drew the bulk of the first long-form Judge Dredd story, "The Cursed Earth", with the slower, more meticulous Brian Bolland contributing occasional episodes.

In 1979 McMahon took some time off from Dredd to draw Pat Mills's robot disaster squad Ro-Busters and its spin-off ABC Warriors, alternating with Kevin O'Neill and others, and under O'Neill's influence his work became tighter and his figures chunkier. He returned to Dredd the following year for the next long story, "The Judge Child", with a different, more considered style, and rotated with Bolland and Ron Smith. Writers John Wagner and Alan Grant gave McMahon the spookier, more atmospheric episodes to draw.

Following "The Judge Child" his art took a high contrast black and white direction, and in colour stories in annuals, explored patterns of flat colour. In 1981, when he began the Judge Dredd story "Block Mania", which he was slated to draw all nine episodes of, his drawings were tight and precise with well-defined areas of black and white. They were taking an increasingly long time to draw, especially with all the crowd scenes the scripts called for, and McMahon bowed out after only two episodes.

McMahon moved to Mills' new Celtic barbarian fantasy, Sláine, another story with a fraught pre-publication history, and all but disappeared from publication for nearly two years (He did draw a couple of stories for Doctor Who Magazine during this time). When he did return in 1983, it was with a radically different style, all sinuous figures, tangled pen lines, and incompletely filled in areas of black. Freed from sterile science fiction environments, he went to town on texture and tone, lashed together technology and organic backgrounds.

After his last work on Sláine in 1984, McMahon re-emerged in 1991, after a long illness that prevented him from drawing, with The Last American, written by Wagner and Grant, for Marvel Comics's Epic imprint, and another radical change in drawing style.

Since then he has worked in computer game design and his work in comics has been sporadic. A couple of Hellraiser stories, an Alien Legion one-off, the unfinished Mutomaniac in the short-lived weekly Toxic!, a handful of Judge Dredd-related stories, and a futuristic Batman story in Legends of the Dark Knight, saw him progressively simplify and flatten his style, then find new ways of introducing depth in Sonic the Comic, the miniseries Tattered Banners for DC Comics's Vertigo imprint, a return to ABC Warriors and a short Batman Black and White back-up story. During this time, he also produced two 6 page strips for the Marvel UK/Panini fully originated fortnightly comic Rugrats (he would have been commissioned to draw more, but the comic was canceled). His latest work, a Judge Dredd episode, appeared in 2000 AD #1539.

In 2011–2012 McMahon drew Tank Girl - Carioca, a six-part mini series with Tank Girl co-creator to Alan Martin for Titan Books.

== Bibliography ==
Comics work includes:

- Jaws of Death (in Starblazer #71 1982)
- Judge Dredd (in 2000 AD #2-4, 6-7, 12, 15-16, 18, 20, 23-24, 26, 28, 30, 32, 34-35, 37, 39, 43-44, 58-85, 89-91, 96-97 & 100, 1977–79)
- Ro-Busters (with Pat Mills, in 2000 AD #103-115, 1979)
- ABC Warriors (with Pat Mills, in 2000 AD #121-22, 125-26, 129, 132-33 & 137-39, 1979)
- The V.C.s (with Gerry Finley-Day, in 2000 AD #140, 1979)
- Judge Dredd (in 2000 AD #144-45, 147, 160-61, 162, 166, 170-71, 176-78, 183-85 & 193-96, 1979–80)
- Doctor Who (in Doctor Who Monthly #58-59, 1981)
- Judge Dredd (in 2000 AD # 236 & 237, 1981)
- Slaine (with Pat Mills, in 2000 AD # 335-336, 343-360, & 1846, 1983–84)
- Muto Maniac (in Toxic! # 1-7, 1991)
- The Last American #1-4 (with John Wagner/Alan Grant, 4-issue mini-series, Epic, 1991)
- Hellraiser #10, 16 (Epic, 1991)
- "Alien Legion: Jugger Grimrod" (with Chuck Dixon, prestige format one-shot, Epic, August 1992, collected in tpb, Alien Legion: Tenants of Hell, Titan Books, April 2004, ISBN 1840238119)
- Batman:
  - "Watchtower" (with Chuck Dixon, in Batman: Legends of the Dark Knight #55-57, DC Comics, December 1993 - February 1994)
  - "Fat City" (writer and artist, with co-writer Dave Gibbons, in Batman: Gotham Knights #18, August 2001, collect in tpb, Batman Black and White, Volume 3, hardcover, Titan Books, August 2007, ISBN 1845765540, softcover, DC Comics, September 2003, ISBN 1401213545)
- Judge Dredd (in Judge Dredd Megazine (vol.2) #53-56, 1994)
- Judge Dredd (in Judge Dredd Megazine (vol.3) #3, 1995)
- Rugrats (#13, 1997)
- Tattered Banners #1-4 (with Alan Grant and Keith Giffen, Vertigo Comics, September 1998 - February 1999)
- ABC Warriors (with Pat Mills, in 2000 AD #1240-42, 2001)
- Judge Dredd (with John Wagner, in 2000 AD #1308, 2002)
- Judge Dredd (with Robbie Morrison, in 2000 AD #1539, 2007)
- Tank Girl: Carioca (with Alan Martin, 3-issue mini-series, Titan Magazines, November 2011 - January 2012, hardcover, Titan Books, October 2012, ISBN 0857687433)
- Hellboy "Hellboy Gets Married" (with Mike Mignola, in Dark Horse Presents Vol. 2 #31-32, Dark Horse Comics, December 2013 - January 2014)
- Tharg (in 2000 AD #2000, 1-page story, September 2016)
- Judge Dredd (with Rory McConville, in 2000 AD #2054, October 2017)

== Sources ==
- Colin M Jarman & Peter Acton (1995), Judge Dredd: The Mega-History
- David Bishop (1995), "Mike McMahon" (interview), The Complete Judge Dredd Special Edition No. 2
- Patrick Brown (1996), "Mike McMahon", The Panelhouse issue 4 pp. 19–22
- David Bishop (2002–2003), "Thrill Power Overload", Judge Dredd Megazine vol 4 issues 9-18, issues 201-209
- Mike McMahon at the Grand Comics Database
- Mike McMahon at the Comic Book DB (archived from the original)
- Mike McMahon at Lambiek's Comiclopedia
- Mike McMahon at 2000 AD online
