= Carlos Pino =

Spanish comics artist

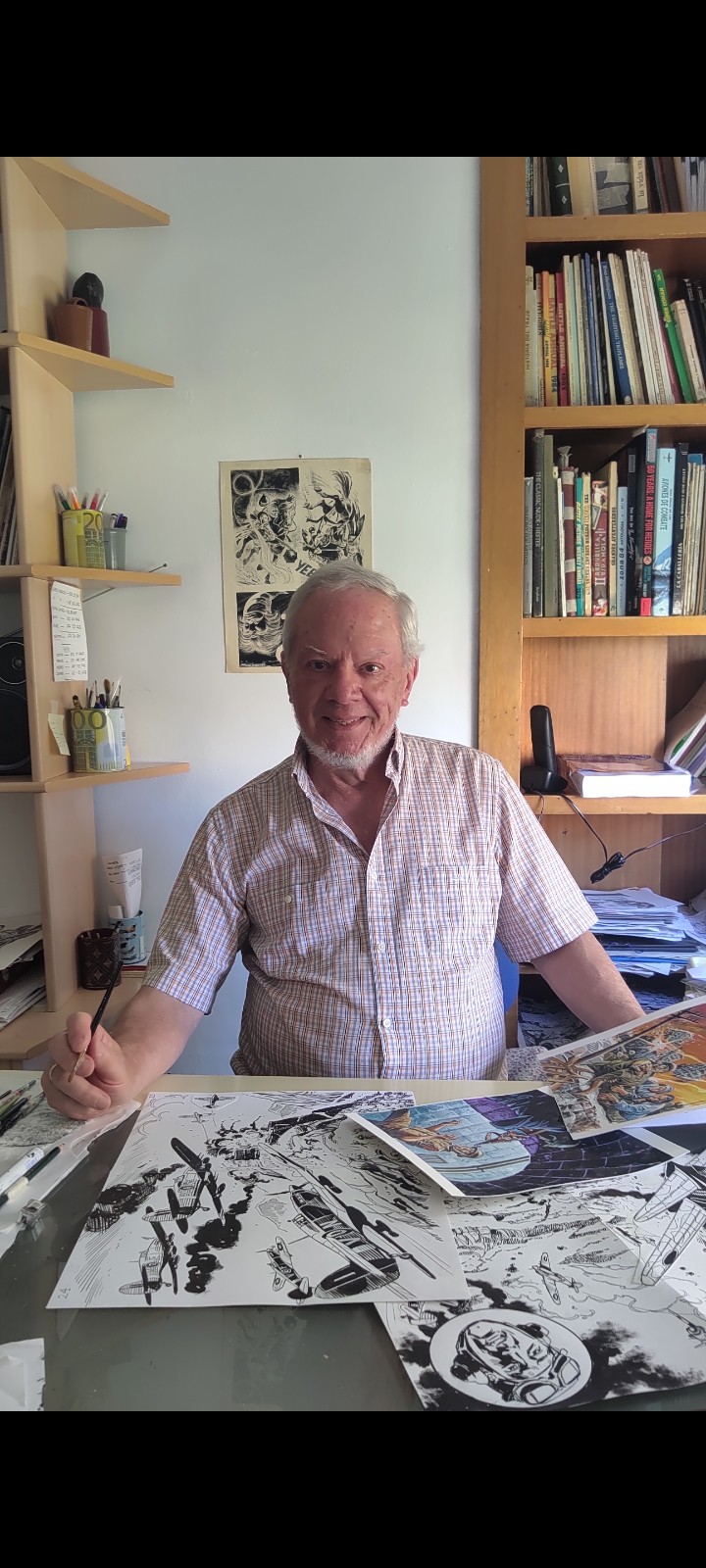
- Born: 7 September 1940 (age 86) Madrid, Spain
- Pseudonym: Carvic

Carlos Pino (born 1940) is a Spanish comics artist who has illustrated Spanish, British, and American comics. In a quarter of a century he provided the art for around three hundred issues of Commando, for which he still continues to work (as of December 2020).

Pino began his career at the age of 14, when he was paid for art he had submitted to Spanish comic Pumby. In the late 1950s he worked professionally for other comics including Duwarin before becoming one of the founders of short-lived comic Toucan. In the 1960s he worked for British comic War Picture Library.

Pino regularly collaborated with Vicente Alcazar under the collective pseudonym "Carvic", working for Spanish war comic Chío and later for British comics War Picture Library and TV Century 21, illustrating Star Trek, The Saint, and Department S. In 1974 they began working for US comics, including Monsters Unleashed, Archie's Madhouse, and Space: 1999. When their partnership ended, Alcazar continued to work for US comics, while Pino returned to UK comics, notably illustrating the strip Johnny Red in Battle Picture Weekly.

Pino went on to illustrate Invasion! for 2000 AD in 1977–78, and its prequel Disaster 1990 (1979), as well as Tharg's Future Shocks for the same comic. He was also the first artist on the series Ro-Busters for Starlord in 1978. He later illustrated Judge Dredd for the Daily Star newspaper (1991–96), although never for that strip's home comic.

In the 1980s, Pino went on to work for Eagle and other comics, including The Victor and Warlord. Since the mid-1990s he has worked continuously for Commando.
