= Bill Savage =

Publication information
- Publisher: Fleetway
- First appearance: 2000 AD No. 1 (1977)
- Created by: Pat Mills

Bill Savage is a fictional character in the British comic anthology 2000 AD, which first appeared in the story Invasion! in issues 1–51. He is a resistance fighter in the Free European Army (FEAR) against the Volgans, who invaded and conquered Britain in 1999 during the Eight Hour War. His family include his brother Jack, a pub owner in Birmingham who was apparently killed when the Midlands was nuked; his sister Cassie and her disabled husband Noddie (who was brain damaged by Volgan non-lethal weaponry), who assist in the resistance; and his other brother Tom, a journalist who publicly co-operated with the Volgans.

== Invasion! ==
Bill Savage appeared in the first issue of 2000 AD (1977), as part of the series Invasion! depicting the conquest of Britain by the Volgan's People's Republic (an alternate version of the USSR which had replaced Communism with Fascism) in the then future year 1999. A lorry driver from East London, he was not particularly political but after discovering his wife, son and daughter had died as collateral damage from a Volgan tank shell, he went out to kill any Volgans he could find. His successful extermination of a Volgan tank crew was spotted by Lieutenant Peter Silk, a member of the British resistance, and Savage was drafted in. Initially leading the Mad Dogs (with Lt. Silk as his 2nd in command) guerilla unit out of a secret base in the Isle of Dogs, Bill Savage became the most successful resistance agent. His flamboyant actions and brutal common sense turned the tide of many missions.

When the heir to the throne, Prince John, returned to Britain, Savage and Silk were involved in keeping him safe and attempting to smuggle him back to Canada. They succeeded, though Silk was killed by Volgan agents. Invasion! ended in prog 51 with Savage believing that, as the Volgan agents had murdered American citizens, the United States would cease being isolationist and would liberate Britain.

== Disaster 1990 ==
In 1979 Bill Savage returned to 2000 AD in Disaster 1990. Set before Invasion! it depicted Savage dealing with the consequences of a nuclear accident that causes the melting of the Arctic Ice Cap and a temporary rise of the coastline that floods southern England.

== Savage ==
The story of Bill Savage's fight against the Volgans continued on in 2004 when 2000 AD published Savage: Taking Liberties; it took place in 2004, turning the strip into an alternate present story rather than alternate future. Savage was depicted as a far grimmer and generally sociopathic character than before; at one point, he slaughters a restaurant full of civilians simply for eating in the same place that Volgans and collaborators do.

It was revealed Bill Savage had returned to Britain to continue in the resistance after discovering the Americans had made a deal with the Volgans; outside of some background support from a CIA contact, they would not help Britain. While in America, he decided to cover up his identity by having plastic surgery to look like his late brother Jack to avoid being captured by the Volgans. He moved in with his sister Cassie and took a job at the gas company as a cover (allowing him to trigger gas explosions against Volgan patrols). A dying resistance member was made to resemble Bill and died during a suicide bombing to fake Bill's death whilst leaving no way to properly identify the body. Bill's other brother Tom was aware of the switch but kept silent.

Under the guise of Jack, Savage and his allies in the Free European Army were almost successful enough to force the Volgans out in Book 1. His subsequent capture by the secret police (and later escape) set off a chain of events that lead to his cover being blown and him – along with Cassie and Noddy – being forced to go underground in Book 3. When Volgan Marshall Vashkov was due to make a visit to Britain, Savage infiltrated the safehouse where he was staying by disguising himself as his brother Tom, who had a press pass for the building and a grudge of the Volgans for his daughter's rape. Although Savage was successful in killing Vashkov, this did not appear to have done any real damage to the Volgan regime.

In Book 3, Bill is seeking personal vengeance against State Security agents who murdered Tom Savage after discovering he had secretly written stories embarrassing to the regime. Savage and his sister Cassie killed all three the agents believed responsible, only to discover that Savage's former-MI6 resistance contact had been behind it and was secretly a collaborator.

In more recent books, the resistance has defeated the Volgs and driven them out of the British Isles with the help of cyborg billionaire Howard Quartz, owner of the Robusters disaster squad. The story Grinders tells how Bill Savage has relocated to Berlin, which is still under the jackboot of Volgan occupation. Under the assumed identity of a local bar owner, Savage hides in plain sight while picking off the occupying forces as the serial killer The Märze Murderer. His identity is discovered by a female detective working for the Volgan police, but before she can arrest him they are attacked by Terminator-style assassin robots, seemingly from the future. Savage discovers these robots are the product of Volgan research enabled by the Thousand Year Stare, a drug that allows research scientists to condense one thousand years of thinking time into a single hour.

== Bibliography ==
Stories Bill Savage has appeared in include:

- Invasion! (by Pat Mills (1) and Gerry Finley-Day, in 2000 AD #1–51, 1977–78)
- Disaster 1990 (by Gerry Finley-Day, in 2000 AD #119–139, 1979)
- Savage (by Pat Mills):
  - "Book I: Taking Liberties" (with Charlie Adlard, in 2000 AD #1387–1396, 2004)
  - "Book II: Out of Order" (with Charlie Adlard, in 2000 AD #1450–1459, 2005)
  - "Book III: Double Yellow" (with Charlie Adlard, in 2000 AD #1526–1535, 2007)
  - "Book IV: The Guv'nor" (with Patrick Goddard, in 2000 AD #1577–1586, 2008)
  - "Book V: 1984" (with Patrick Goddard, in 2000 AD #1632–1641, 2009)
  - "Book VI: Crims" (with Patrick Goddard, in 2000 AD #1685–1699, 2010)
  - "Book VII: Secret City" (with Patrick Goddard, in 2000 AD #1740–1749, 2011)
  - "Book VIII: Rise Like Lions" (with Patrick Goddard, in 2000 AD #2013 and #1813–1823, 2012–13)
  - "Book IX: Grinders" (with Patrick Goddard, in 2000 AD #2015 and #1912–1923, 2014–15)
  - "Book X: The Marze Murderer" (with Patrick Goddard, in 2000 AD 2001–2010, 2016)
  - "Book XI: The 1000 Year Stare" (with Patrick Goddard, in 2000 AD 2061–2071, 2017–18)

=== Collected volumes ===
The stories (excepting Disaster 1990) have been collected into a number of trade paperbacks:

- Invasion! (collects 2000 AD #1–51, March 2007, Rebellion, ISBN 1-905437-26-9)
- The Complete Savage:
  - Volume 1: Taking Liberties (collects Savage Books I to III, June 2007, Rebellion, ISBN 1-905437-28-5)
  - Volume 2: The Guv'nor (collects Savage Books IV to VI, July 2012, Rebellion, ISBN 1781080402)
