= Invasion! (2000 AD) =

Comic book series

Publication information
- Publisher: 2000 AD
- Schedule: Weekly
- Publication date: 26 February 1977 – 11 February 1978

Creative team
- Created by: Pat Mills and Jesús Blasco
- Written by: various, mainly Gerry Finley-Day
- Artist: various (see below)

Invasion! was a series created by Pat Mills and mostly written by Gerry Finley-Day that appeared in the first 51 editions of the weekly comic 2000 AD.

The series introduced the character of Bill Savage, a classic anti-authoritarian character of the type which Mills is best known for. A prequel, Disaster 1990, was published in 1979. The series continued in sequels under the title Savage, beginning in 2004, by Pat Mills and Charlie Adlard.

== Alternate historical background ==
In the alternate recent history established in Savage, the Soviet Union fell to a fascist military coup and was renamed the Volgan Republic by Marshal Vashkov in 1991. In 1992, vast new reserves of North Sea oil were discovered off the coast of Britain. Ken Livingstone became head of the Labour Party, and his "True Labour" movement gained power over Shirley Brown's Conservative Party in a 1995 general election. In 1996, Prime Minister Livingstone ordered the removal of all American military bases from the British Isles; by 1998, a newly isolationist United States had withdrawn completely from Europe and the North Atlantic Treaty Organization (NATO).

By 1999, Prince Charles was King of the United Kingdom. The United States and Volgan Republic had a secret agreement, carving up the world into spheres of influence. Meanwhile, a fifth column among the establishment, feeling threatened by the new left-wing government, made overtures to the Volgans, offering to help with any invasion.

== Synopsis ==
=== Invasion! ===
Set in the year 1999, the first part of the series depicts Western Europe and the United Kingdom's being swiftly overrun by an invasion from the Volgan Republic known as the Eight-Hour War. North Sea oil rigs are seized by helicopter-borne commando units; Heathrow airport is captured by paratroopers, allowing heavy transport planes to land delivering heavy armour close to London; and the Midlands are hit by nuclear weapons, including a 50 megaton warhead. British royal family escape to Canada, The UK Government capitulates, with many hard line anti-Volgan MPs, Lords, and generals along with Prime Minister Shirley Brown being executed; a puppet government, under Prime Minister Simon Creepton, takes control for the puppet state of The People's Republic of Britain.

Bill Savage, an East-End lorry driver, begins a one-man resistance movement against the Volgans after his wife and children are killed when Savage's home is hit by a Volgan tank shell during the invasion. As with similar characters that Mills and Day had created for other titles (such as Action and Battle Picture Weekly), Savage is given a gimmick, his preferred weapons: a hauling hook and a sawn-off shotgun. Initially solo, he is recruited by Lt. Peter Silk into the British resistance. Initially leading the Mad Dogs cell out of the Isle of Dogs, Savage would later be mobile and take part in resistance action throughout the country. Throughout the series, Savage's brutal violence and working-class common sense lead to victory, whereas military resistance is depicted as being class bound and ineffectual.

At the end of the series, Savage is tasked with taking the heir to the throne, Prince John, to safety in Canada. He smuggled the prince into North America on a US cargo ship; as Volgan agents murdered most of the crew trying to stop him, the series ended with Savage believing the United States would now get involved against the Volgans.

The Volgan War (AKA the Fourth Oil War) became part of a connecting back story for a number of 2000 AD series including ABC Warriors.

=== Disaster 1990 ===
A year after the first series ended, Savage returned in a prequel set nine years earlier (but still over a decade in the future) called Disaster 1990. In this story most of Britain has been flooded by an environmental catastrophe, and the survivors fight each other. This disaster was not mentioned in the original series or in the sequels.

=== Savage ===
In the sequel series Savage, the Volgans are still in command in 2004, but are opposed by terrorist insurgent groups such as the Free European Army and Traitor's Gate. Escapist fiction is abundant, and produced by the Volgans themselves to pacify the general public; propaganda campaigns try to convince people to accept the occupation and not be "bitter-enders". Some have come to accept the occupation or actively collaborate with it; they are described as "Double Yellows", after the twin yellow stripes on the uniforms of the British State Security agents and police officers who collaborate with the Volgan regime.

Despite the non-aggression agreement with the United States, American small arms and other weapons are used by resistance movements. Savage also has a CIA contact, and the two share information against the Volgans. Any major activity, however, is not taken and occupied Britain does not seem a high priority. (They would also be caught off-guard and be left out in the 2004 uprising.)

Under the direction of Savage, the resistance groups almost force the Volgans to withdraw from Britain in 2004, though they manage to cling to power and send renewed troop numbers in. Subsequently, Savage assassinated Vashkov. Consequently, State Security agents retaliate by murdering Savage's brother Tom after discovering he had secretly written stories that would be embarrassing to the regime. Savage and his sister Cassie kill all of the agents responsible, only it is discovered that Savage's former-MI6 resistance contact had been behind it and was secretly a collaborator. Savage then kills him and his security team and posts a copy of his brother's work on the Internet. As a result, the resistance, alongside the population, rises up against the Volgan "peacekeepers" and liberates most of Southern England.

Book Four, however, opens with the country re-occupied after 2006, when a fresh surge of troops is deployed. By now, people in Britain are coming to accept Volgan rule. The United States is secretly outfitting resistance units with American weaponry and preparing to use Ireland as a staging ground for a liberation. Savage prevents the Volgans from causing a fake terrorist atrocity to drive off the Americans and by 2009 the Allied forces are openly bombing Volgan targets in London. American forces use an EMP bomb on London, wiping out most electronics and reducing it to a 1984 level of technology.

2009 also sees the liberation of Britain begin, with army robots being used as the advance wave at Fishguard. The Volgans develop a teleport machine and send their troops directly into American bases to kill the commanding officers. The teleport base is destroyed by Savage and his resistance group. In response to the ABC Warriors, the Volgans create their own battle robots called Mark 1 Blackblood robots, but most are destroyed in their secret underground factory before they can be deployed.

In 2010 Mark Two Hammersteins are deployed and enable the resistance to retake Cardiff, Bristol and the Oil Refinery Port - Britain's newly discovered oil reserves are the third largest in the world and the reason why the Volgans invaded in 1999. To prevent the Volgans from retaking London they destroy all bridges except Waterloo which becomes a focal point in the battle. The Tolpuddle Gang, who have fought with Savage's unit, believe that they are being betrayed and abandon Savage at Waterloo bridge, although his unit successfully defend the bridge without the Tolpuddle Gang, despite them being proved correct when resistance war robots turn on them.

Six months after the Volgans have surrendered Britain is about to become a Republic after the king abdicated, and Savage has no need to fight anymore, so returned to his sister's cafe. During a protest over jobs Hammersteins fire into the crowd and in the confusion Savage is kidnapped by collaborators, one of whom turns out to be his brother Jack, previously thought dead, but now a cyborg taking orders from the Volgans.

During a parade both Hammersteins and the cyborgs attack the public, but are defeated by Savage, his unit, and the regular army. One of the casualties of the fight is Howard Quartz who has his brain saved, and placed into a robotic body, thus becoming a cyborg himself.

In 2015, Savage lives undercover in Volgan occupied Germany. Hearing about a powerful but unknown artefact called "The Thousand Year Stare" Savage tracks Wolfie Vos, a member of the Edelweiss Pirates, and the only person who knows what and where it is. Savage is joined by Nika Volodina a disillusioned member of the secret police, and the two track down Vos who initially intends to kill Savage to appease the Volgans and reduce the risk against his own gang. Vos changes his mind when they are attacked anyway by the Volgans, and Savage and Volodina use the opportunity to escape both Volgans and the gang.

== The weapons of Bill Savage ==
When Invasion! started, Bill Savage was armed with a double barrelled shotgun. After getting into contact with the British Resistance, he was given a pump-action shotgun. Throughout the original series and in the new Savage series, Bill Savage is shown to be skilled in the use of various types of firearms – both friendly and enemy

The various firearms Bill Savage uses in the Invasion! and Savage series comics, besides his tried and trusted double-barreled side-by-side shotgun, are:

- Various types of AK rifles the Volgan Army uses
- The Beretta Model 92FS pistol (as seen in Savage: Taking Liberties, in which he used this in conjunction with his pump-action shotgun)
- The Heckler & Koch MP5 submachine gun
- The Kalashnikov AKSU-74 assault rifle (as seen in the recent Savage series)
- The L1A1 Self-Loading Rifle 7.62.mm automatic rifle (as Invasion was published in 1977, the writers had no idea that by 1999 the British Army would be using the L85 series of 5.56.mm rifles)
- The Remington Model 870 pump-action shotgun (the pump-action shotgun Bill Savage uses resembles the Remington Model 870)

== Soviets / Volgans ==
The Volgans were originally intended to be the Soviets, but IPC's management forced a last-minute change to the fictional "Volgan Republic of Asia" for fear of offending the Soviets. Savage portrays the Volgans as Russians who have changed their name after a successful 1991 Soviet coup d'état.

== Bibliography ==
- Invasion! (all episodes written by Gerry Finley-Day, except episodes 1 and 7 written by Pat Mills, 22 by Nick Allen, 34 by Nick Flynn, 36 by Chris Lowder; art by Jesús Blasco, Pat Wright, Juan Sarompas, Ian Kennedy, Mike Dorey, Carlos Pino, Eric Bradbury, Luis Collado, in 2000 AD #1-51, 1977–78)
- Disaster 1990 (written by Gerry Finley-Day, art by Carlos Pino, Mike White and Alan Willow, in 2000 AD #119-139, 1979)
- Savage (all episodes written by Pat Mills):
  - "Book I: Taking Liberties" (art by Charlie Adlard, in 2000 AD #1387-1396, 2004)
  - "Book II: Out of Order" (art by Charlie Adlard, in 2000 AD #1450-1459, 2005)
  - "Book III: Double Yellow" (art by Charlie Adlard, in 2000 AD #1526-1535, 2007)
  - "Book IV: The Guv'nor" (art by Patrick Goddard, in 2000 AD #1577-1586, 2008)
  - "Book V: 1984" (art by Patrick Goddard, in 2000 AD #1632-1641, 2009)
  - "Book VI: Crims" (art by Patrick Goddard, in 2000 AD #1685-1699, 2010)
  - "Book VII: Secret City" (art by Patrick Goddard, in 2000 AD #1740-1749, 2011)
  - "Book VIII: Rise Like Lions" (art by Patrick Goddard, in 2000 AD Prog 2013 and #1813-1823, 2012–2013)
  - "Book IX: Grinders" (art by Patrick Goddard, in 2000 AD Prog 2015 and #1912-1923, 2015–2016)
  - "Book X: The Märze Murderer" (art by Patrick Goddard, in 2000 AD #2001-2010, 2016)
  - "Book XI: The Thousand-Year Stare" (art by Patrick Goddard, in 2000 AD #2061-2071, 2017–18)

=== Collected editions ===
The titles have been collected into trade paperbacks:

- Invasion (March 2007, ISBN 1-905437-26-9)
- Savage: Taking Liberties (June 2007, ISBN 1-905437-28-5)
- Savage: The Guv'nor (July 2012, ISBN 1-781080-40-2)
