= Henry Flint =

British comic book artist

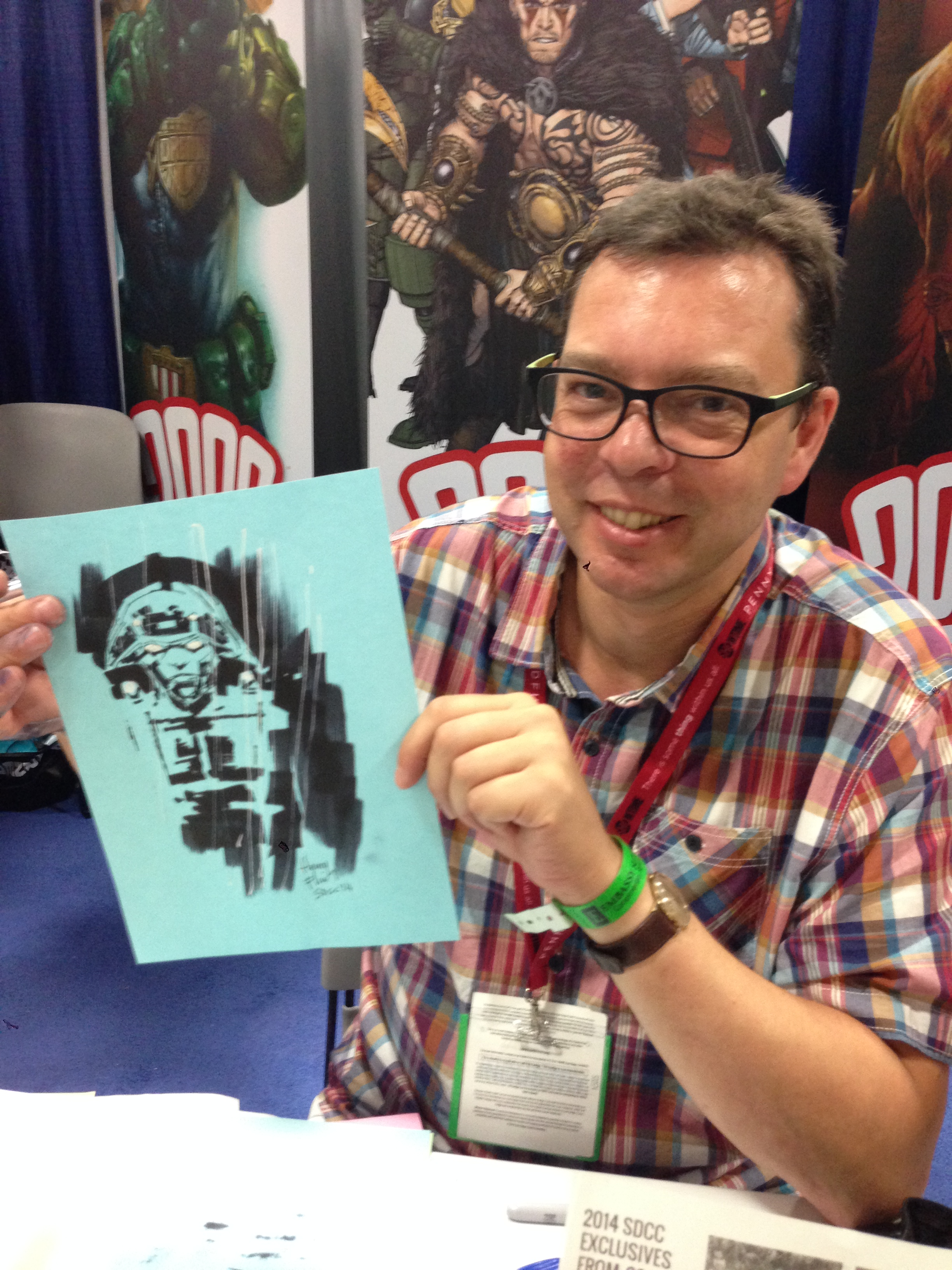
- Flint at the 2014 San Diego Comic-Con
- Area: Artist
- Notable works: Shakara; Zombo; Judge Dredd
- Awards: Best Comics Artist, Diamond National Comics Awards, 2004

Henry Flint is a British comic book artist who has worked mainly for British science fiction comic 2000 AD.

== Biography ==
Flint has established a following for his work on series such as Judge Dredd, Zombo, ABC Warriors, Shakara, Low Life and Aliens.

His works include drawing a six-issue mini-series of the Omega Men written by Andersen Gabrych, which commenced in October 2006 and inking Deathblow, as well as Vertigo's relaunch of The Haunted Tank in December 2008 written by Frank Marraffino.

== Bibliography ==
=== Comics ===
Comics work includes:

- Death's Head II No. 16 (with Dan Abnett, Marvel UK, March 1994)
- Rogue Trooper (Friday): (with Steve White):
  - "Mercy Killing" (in 2000 AD #889–891, May 1994)
  - "Some Mother's Son" (in 2000AD Sci-Fi Special 1994)
  - "Mercenary Attitudes" (in 2000 AD #896–899, 1994)
  - "Blue on Blue" (in 2000 AD #928–931, 1995)
- Rune/Silver Surfer (pencils, with writers Dan Danko/Chris Ulm, one-shot, Malibu Comics, April 1995)
- Venus Bluegenes: "Stealth" (with Steve White, in 2000 AD #980–982, 1996)
- Sinister Dexter: "Family Man" (with Dan Abnett, in 2000 AD No. 994, 1996)
- Judge Dredd:
  - "The Pack" (with John Wagner, in 2000 AD #1014–1016, 1996)
  - "Dance of the Spider Queen" (with John Wagner, in 2000 AD #1041–1044, 1997)
  - "Trail of the Man-Eaters" (with John Wagner, in 2000 AD #1048–1049, 1997)
  - Judge Dredd The Henry Flint Collection (Rebellion, April 2008, ISBN 978-1-905437-64-1) collects:
    - "Mrs. Gunderson's Little Adventure" (with John Wagner, in 2000 AD #1063–1065, 1997)
    - "J. D. Megson" (with John Wagner, in Judge Dredd Megazine (vol. 3) No. 63, 2000)
    - "Turned Out Quite Nice Again" (with John Wagner, in 2000 AD #1207–1208, 2000)
    - "Turkey Shoot" (with John Wagner, in Judge Dredd Megazine No. 214, 2004)
    - "Flood's Thirteen" (with John Wagner, in Judge Dredd Megazine No. 237, 2005)
    - "Change of Loyalties" (with Gordon Rennie, in 2000 AD #1466, 2005)
    - "Streetfighting Man" (with Robbie Morrison, in Judge Dredd Megazine #258–259, 2007)
    - "The Gingerbread Man" (with John Wagner, in Judge Dredd Megazine #261–262, 2007)
  - "Banzai Battalion" (with John Wagner, in 2000 AD #1135–1137, 1998)
  - "Total War" (with John Wagner, in 2000 AD #1408–1419, 2004)
  - "Day of Chaos: The Fourth Faction" (with John Wagner, in 2000 AD #1750–1751, September 2011)
  - "Day of Chaos: Elusive" (with John Wagner, in 2000 AD #1753–1758, September–November 2011)
- Missionary Man (with Gordon Rennie):
  - "Juggernaut" (in Judge Dredd Megazine (vol. 3) No. 34, 1997)
  - "Apocrypha" (in 2000 AD #1124, 1998)
- Vector 13: "Case One: Devil in the Deep Blue Sea" (with Steve White, in 2000 AD #1024, 1997)
- Invasion!: "Invasion! 3000AD" (with David Bishop/Steve MacManus, in 2000 AD #1034, 1997)
- Nikolai Dante: "The Gulag Apocalyptic" (with Robbie Morrison, in 2000 AD #1079–1084, 1998)
- Sancho Panzer (with Dan Abnett, in 2000 AD #1112–1123, 1998)
- Nemesis the Warlock: "Book X: The Final Conflict" (with Pat Mills, in 2000 AD #1165–1172, 1999)
- Deadlock (with Pat Mills, in 2000 AD #1212–1222, 2000)
- Tharg the Mighty (in 2000 AD Prog 2001, 2000)
- ABC Warriors (with Pat Mills):
  - "The Third Element" (in 2000 AD #1234–1236, 2001)
  - "Assault on the Red House" (in 2000 AD #1246–1248, 2001)
  - "The Shadow Warriors Book II" (in 2000 AD #1400–1405, 2004)
  - "The Shadow Warriors Book III" (in 2000 AD #1476–1485, 2006)
- Shakara (with Robbie Morrison):
  - "Shakara" (in 2000 AD Prog 2002 & #1273–1279, 2001–2002)
  - "The Assassin" (in 2000 AD #1441–1449, 2005)
  - "The Defiant" (in 2000 AD #1567–1573, 2008)
  - "Destroyer" (in 2000 AD #1650–1661, 2009)
  - "Avenger" (in 2000 AD Prog 2011 & #1715–1727, 2010–2011)
- The V.C.s: "Peace Day" (with Dan Abnett, in 2000 AD #1300–1306, 2002)
- Judge Dredd vs. Aliens: Incubus (with co-writers: John Wagner and Andy Diggle, in 2000 AD #1332–1335, 2003, tpb, 104 pages, Rebellion Developments, 2003 ISBN 1-904265-10-3 Dark Horse, 2004 ISBN 1-56971-983-7)
- Payback (with Andy Diggle, in Star Wars Tales 18, Dark Horse Comics, 2003)
- Tharg's Alien Invasions (script and art, Prog 2004, Prog 2005, 2003–2004)
- Low Life (Rob Williams):
  - "Paranoia" (in 2000 AD #1387–1396, 2004)
  - "Heavy Duty" (in 2000 AD #1397–1399, 2004)
- Omega Men (with Andersen Gabrych, 6-issue limited series, DC, October 2006 – May 2007)
- Deathblow #4–7 (inks, with writer Brian Azzarello and pencils by Carlos D'Anda, Wildstorm, May 2007 – October 2007, collected in Deathblow, Volume 1, August 2008, ISBN 1-4012-1515-7)
- "The Caretakers" (with Lilah Sturges, in House of Mystery No. 8, Vertigo, February 2009)
- The Haunted Tank (with Frank Marraffino, 5-issue limited series, Vertigo, February – June 2009)
- Zombo (with Al Ewing):
  - "Zombo" (in 2000 AD #1632–1639, April–June 2009)
  - "Zombo's 11" (in 2000 AD #1675–1684, March–May 2010)
  - "The Day the Zombo Died" (in 2000 AD #1740–1749, June–August 2011)
- Gears of War #7–8 (inks (7–8) and pencils (8), with writer Joshua Ortega, Wildstorm, June–July 2009)
- Fear Itself: Fearsome Four No. 3 (with writer Brandon Montclare, 4-issue mini-series, Marvel Comics, forthcoming)

=== Other ===
Henry Flint is also responsible for the album artwork included on a series of 3 EP's and a 2012 album, The Search Engine, by DJ Food on the Ninja Tune record label.

== Awards ==
- 2004: Won "Best Comics Artist", Diamond National Comics Awards
