= Simon Fraser (comics) =

British comics artist and writer

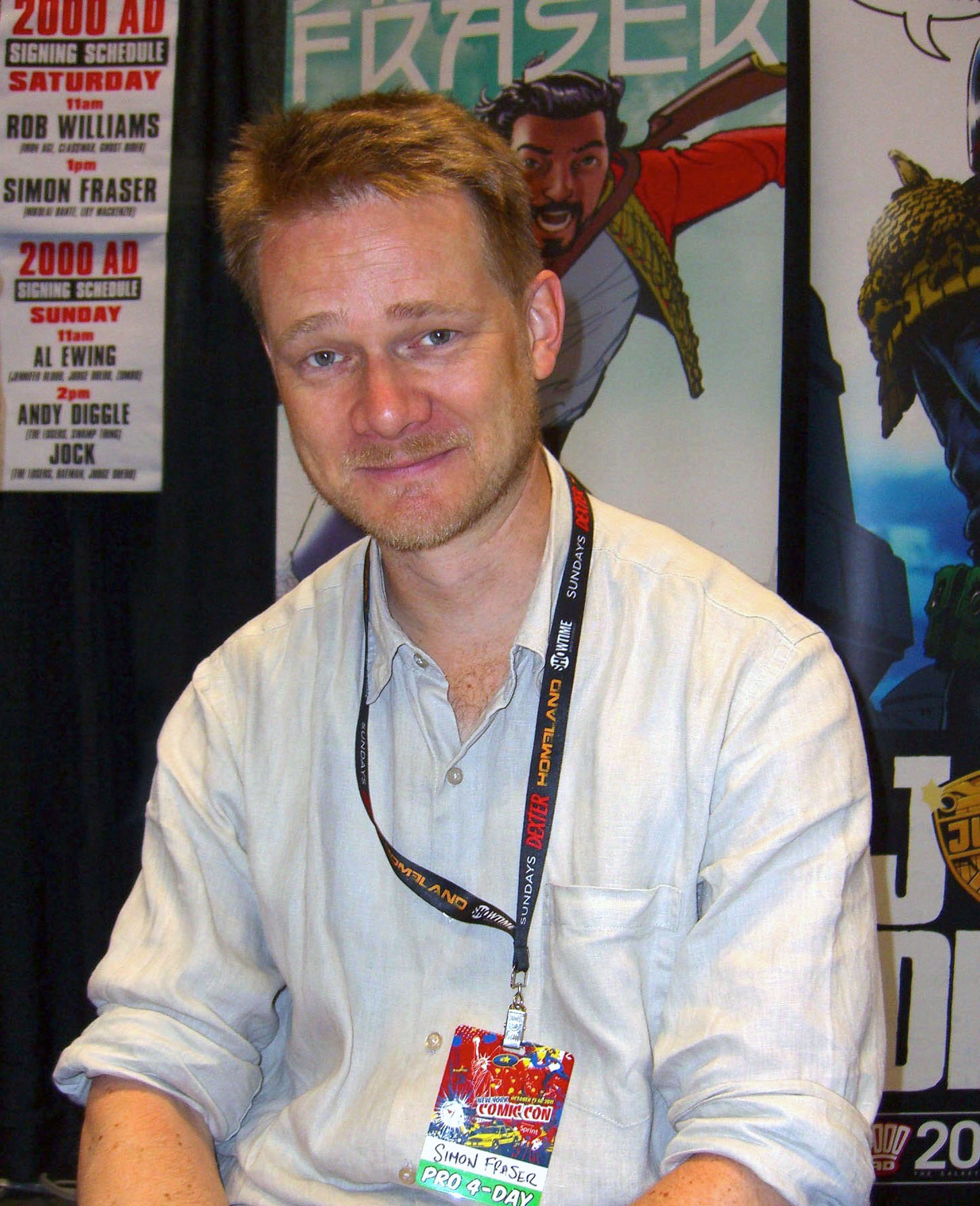
- Fraser at the 2011 New York Comic Con
- Area: Artist
- Notable works: Nikolai Dante; Tales of the Night Watchman; Kingsman: The Red Diamond

Simon Fraser is a British comics artist and writer best known for his work on Nikolai Dante, a series he created with writer Robbie Morrison in 2000 AD, Tales of the Night Watchman for So What? Press, and Kingsman: The Red Diamond for Image Comics.

== Career ==
Fraser's early work includes Lux and Alby Sign on and Save the Universe, a 1993–1994 collaboration with novelist Martin Millar co-published by Acme Press and Dark Horse Comics. Despite having little interest in football, he worked on Roy of the Rovers, including drawing the character's final appearance in 1995. This led to David Bishop's commissioning him to work on Shimura in the Judge Dredd Megazine, where he first collaborated with Robbie Morrison.

The pair then created Nikolai Dante, a swashbuckling adventure story set amid dynastic intrigue in a future Russia, which debuted in 2000 AD in 1997. Fraser was the main artist on the strip, occasionally rotating with other artists, until 2002; the primary artist since then has been John M. Burns, although Fraser returned to the character in 2006 for the storyline "Sword of the Tsar". Also for 2000 AD, Fraser has drawn a number of Judge Dredd stories.

Returning to the Judge Dredd Megazine in 2003, he collaborated with writer Rob Williams on Family, a black and white series about a crime family with superhuman powers, which has recently been published as a collected edition. In 2005 he drew a four-part adaptation of Richard Matheson's Hell House, scripted by Ian Edginton and published by IDW Publishing.

Fraser produced art on The Adventures of Nikolai Dante for 2000 AD, and the self-penned Lilly MacKenzie and the Mines of Charybdis which was published online, a page per week (every Friday) as part of the online comics collective Act-i-vate.

In 2015, he started drawing covers for the horror comic, Tales of the Night Watchman, published by So What? Press. From 2017 to 2018, he was the primary illustrator for the Kingsman comic book sequel The Red Diamond for Image Comics, written by Rob Williams. In 2018, he drew the sequential art for "The Ghost Train", about the elevated train involved in the infamous Malbone Street Wreck returning to terrorize the city on the centenary of the accident, which kicked off Tales of the Night Watchman's run as a newspaper strip in Brooklyn, New York's Park Slope Reader. The story debuted in the paper's Spring 2018 edition, number 64. The strips were colored by Gary Caldwell, Simon Fraser's frequent collaborator.

== Accolades ==
In 2018, Fraser received a Ringo Award nomination for best cover artist for his work on Tales of the Night Watchman, Kingsman, and The Consultant.

== Bibliography ==
Nikolai Dante on the cover of 2000 AD, drawn by Simon Fraser. Copyright Rebellion A/S 2005.

- Lux and Alby Sign On and Save the Universe
- Roy of the Rovers
- Shimura (with Robbie Morrison):
  - "The Transcendental Assassin" (in Judge Dredd Megazine vol. 2 #74, 1995)
  - "Assassins" (with Robert McCallum, in Judge Dredd Megazine vol. 2 #76-77, 1995)
  - "Dragon Fire" (in Judge Dredd Megazine vol. 3 #14-17, 1996)
  - "Ronin Breed" (in Judge Dredd Megazine vol. 3 #34, 1997)
- Nikolai Dante (with Robbie Morrison):
  - "Nikolai Dante" (in 2000 AD #1035-1041, 1997)
  - "The Romanov Dynasty" (in 2000 AD #1042-1049, 1997)
  - "The Gentleman Thief" (in 2000 AD #1067-1070, 1997)
  - "Moscow Duellists" (in 2000 AD #1072-1075, 1997)
  - "The Trouble with Arbatovs" (in 2000 AD #1083, 1998)
  - "Cruel Britannia" (in 2000 AD #1084, 1998)
  - "The Great Game" (in 2000 AD #1101-1110, 1998)
  - "The Moveable Feast" (in 2000 AD #1128-1130, 1999)
  - "The Cadre Infernale" (in 2000 AD #1134-1137, 1999)
  - "The Courtship of Jena Makarov " (in 2000 AD #1161-1172, 1999)
  - "Love and War" (in 2000 AD Prog 2000, 1999)
  - "Battleship Potemkin" (in 2000 AD #1213-1220, 2000)
  - "The Return of the Gentleman Thief" (in 2000 AD Prog 2002 & #1273-1274, 2001–2002)
  - "The Romanov Job" (in 2000 AD #1280-1287, 2002)
  - "Sword of the Tsar" (in 2000 AD #1511-1517, 2006)
  - "Hellfire" (in 2000 AD #1526-1532, 2007)

(This list is incomplete; you can help by adding to it)

- Judge Dredd:
  - "Blood Cadets" (with John Wagner, in 2000 AD #1186-1188, 2000)
  - "Something Over My Shoulder is Drooling " (with Robbie Morrison, in 2000 AD #1226, 2001)
  - "Zoom Time" (with John Wagner, in 2000 AD #1311, 2002)
  - "Club Sov" (with Gordon Rennie, in 2000 AD #1358, 2003)
  - "Jumped" (with John Smith, in 2000 AD #1491-1494, 2006)
  - "In Control" (with art by Michael Carroll, in 2000 AD #1717, January 2011)
- Family (with Rob Williams, in Judge Dredd Megazine #201-207, 2003)
- Richard Matheson's Hell House (with Ian Edginton, 4-issue mini-series, IDW Publishing, 2004–2005, tpb, 200 pages, October 2008, ISBN 1-60010-263-8)
- Lily MacKenzie and the Mines of Charybdis (script and art), in Judge Dredd Megazine #298–305, 2010
- Kingsman: The Red Diamond (with Rob Williams, 6-issue mini-series, Image Comics, 2017–2018, tbp, 144 pages, April 2018, ISBN 1-53430-509-2
