= Nikolai Dante =

2000 AD comic book series

- Nikolai Dante on the cover of 2000 AD #1139. Art by Simon Fraser

Character information
- First appearance: 2000 AD #1035 (1997)
- Created by: Robbie Morrison; Simon Fraser

In-story information
- Team affiliations: Agent of Tsar Vladimir the Conqueror; Romanov Dynasty; Katarina Dante's pirate crew
- Partnerships: Elena Kurakin
- Notable aliases: Quentin Durward
- Abilities: Bio-blades, accelerated healing, telepathic communication with a Weapons Crest (an alien computer disguised as the Romanov crest); expert marksman with fast reflexes

Publication information
- Publisher: Rebellion Developments
- Schedule: Weekly
- Formats: Original material for the series has been published as a strip in the comics anthology(s) 2000 AD.
- Genre: Action/adventure, science fiction
- Publication date: March 1997 – July 2012
- Main character(s): Nikolai Dante; Jena Makarov

Creative team
- Writer(s): Robbie Morrison
- Artist(s): Simon Fraser; John Burns; Chris Weston; Charlie Adlard; Henry Flint; Andy Clarke; Steve Yeowell
- Letterer(s): Annie Parkhouse; Steve Potter; Ellie de Ville
- Editor(s): Tharg the Mighty

Reprints
- Collected editions
- The Romanov Dynasty: ISBN 1-904265-20-0
- The Great Game: ISBN 1-904265-32-4
- The Courtship of Jena Makarov: ISBN 1-904265-44-8
- Tsar Wars Volume 1: ISBN 1-904265-95-2
- Tsar Wars Volume 2: ISBN 1-905437-24-2
- Hell and High Water: ISBN 1-905437-59-5
- Sword of the Tsar: ISBN 978-1-905437-69-6
- The Beast of Rudinshtein: ISBN 978-1-905437-92-4
- Amerika: ISBN 978-1-906735-12-8
- Hero of the Revolution: ISBN 978-1-907992-22-3

Nikolai Dante is a comic book series published in the weekly British science fiction anthology 2000 AD from March 1997 until July 2012.

== History ==
Nikolai Dante was created by writer Robbie Morrison and artist Simon Fraser. The lead character, Dante, first appeared in 1997 in Prog 1035, and he made his final appearance in 2012 in Prog 1791. Fraser was the primary artist for the first three years of the series, with support from artists including Charlie Adlard, Henry Flint, Chris Weston and Andy Clarke. From 2000, the majority of the stories were painted by John Burns, until Fraser returned to the character in October 2006, when the two artists began to alternate on different stories. Morrison is now working on a spin-off series set in the same universe.

== Plot ==
In the 27th century after a resurgent Imperial Russia has seized control of Earth and an interstellar domain, Dante, a swashbuckling young thief and ladies' man, discovers he is an illegitimate scion of the Romanov Dynasty, aristocratic rivals to the Tsar. Dante's Romanov genes bond him with a sentient "Weapons Crest", a biological weapon that gives superhuman abilities—in Dante's case, the ability to extend bio-blades from his hands and hack into computer systems. He outrages aristocratic society and enjoys a turbulent relationship with Tsarina Jena. Dmitri, the Romanov patriarch and bitter enemy of the Tsar, tries to mold Dante into an aristocrat and killer worthy of the Romanov name.

Dmitri's underhanded political maneuvering prompts his war between the Makarov and Romanov dynasties, despite Jena's and Dante's attempts to prevent it, and the lovers break off their burgeoning romance. The civil war rips the empire apart, and Dante is forced to commit many atrocities. Vladimir triumphs, Dmitri dies by his own hand, and the power of the Romanovs is broken. Dante, now the most wanted man in the empire, returns to thieving, joining his mother, Katarina Dante, and her pirate crew. After spending time in the Pacific, he is forcibly recruited into the Imperial Service.

In his new role as Sword of the Tsar, Dante works against everything he once held dear, though he secretly abuses his position in order to plot against his employer as he begins to build a secret army. A massacre in the oppressed state of Amerika prompts Dante to try to kill the tsar. Imprisoned and tortured, Dante escapes from jail with the help of Jena, and the two renew their relationship and raise an army of thieves and whores to win a revolutionary war against the tsar. Tsar Vladimir is put on trial for his crimes and Dante proposes to Jena. Their happiness is cut short by the return of Dmitri Romanov.

Dmitri embarks on a rampage, murdering several of Dante's close allies, capturing Jena and destroying Dante's weapons crest. He tightens his grip on the empire, planning to marry Jena and execute Vladimir on their wedding day, Dante fights the same war against a different enemy. On the day of Jena's forced wedding to Dmitri, Dante leads his army to a second, final triumph that leaves Dmitri dead and a new era of peace and prosperity set to begin.

== Characters ==
- Nikolai Dante – thief, ladies' man and illegitimate son of Dmitri Romanov. Dante's mother is Katarina Dante, a feared pirate. Abandoned at a young age, Dante was forced to survive by turning to crime. He inadvertently becomes bonded with the weapons crest intended for Arkady Romanov, which allows Dante to generate bio-blades and provides him with limited regenerative abilities. The crest is also able to access and hack most computer systems used by both civilian and military society. Finally, recognising that Dante is of common birth, it constantly attempts to educate him on the correct manners of a nobleman.

=== The Romanovs ===
The Romanovs are one of the most powerful dynasties in Russia, descended directly from Peter the Great, and rivalling the Makarovs in influence and military power. The main sources of the family's power are its "Weapons Crests", cybernetic symbionts from another dimension, which provide their bearers with incredible powers. The crests were designed to only bond with the DNA of the Romanov family.

- Dmitri Romanov – Patriarch of the Romanov dynasty, bitter rival of the tsar, and Dante's father. He is fanatically devoted to seeing his family regain their rightful place as the masters of the empire. Possessing a crest that could override the abilities of all others, he apparently commits suicide at the end of the war. However, he downloads his consciousness into his youngest child, Arkady Romanov, allowing for his dramatic return six years later. He is killed in the final battle when Katrina Dante shoots him twice with the Huntsmans Rifle.
- Jocasta Romanov – Dmitri's sister and, via genetic engineering, the mother of his legitimate children, she is killed by Dimitri when he reveals to still be alive. These are:
  - Valentine – the "blunt instrument" of the Romanov Dynasty, scarred physically and mentally by his prototype crest, killed by his own weapon crest.
  - Konstantin – a born leader, his crest generates nuclear fusion energy. Although he is believed to have been killed (by Dante) during the Battle of New Moscow, he survives and becomes the Lord Protector. He is the final Romanov that Dante kills, in a one-on-one fight to the death.
  - Andreas – a womaniser and hellraiser, his crest gives him throwable bio-blades. Similar in many ways to Dante, he is the closest to a friend Dante has in the Romanov dynasty. He is killed during the civil war, when he is the only Romanov to help Dante defend Rundinshtein from the Tsar's army.
  - Lulu – a seductive vamp and a high priestess of the Cadre Infernale. Her crest creates swarms of vicious demons. At the end of the civil war, Lulu surrenders to the Imperial forces, but escapes shortly after and begins waging a terrorist campaign against the empire. She is believed to have been killed by Dante after the war on the orders of Vladimir, but later resurfaces as part of Dante's revolutionary army. After the fall of Vladimir and Dimitri's return, she appears to accept her father's offer of rejoining him by capturing Dante, which is later revealed to be a ruse to get Dante to the heart of the Imperial Palace. She, Viktor and Dante are the only Romanovs to survive the saga.
  - Nastasia – a narcissistic sexual predator. Her crest allows her to spit deadly venom and acids, killed by the Lord Protector.
  - Alexandr and Alexandra – twins whose crests allow them to combine into one super-being, as well as produce explosive nano-mines. They are the first of the Romanovs in the saga to be killed by Dante after they attempt to take his and Jena's lives.
  - Arkady – youngest of Dmitri's sons. The crest intended for him bonded with Dante instead. Always the closest to Dmitri, Arkady survives the war and is made a ward of the Imperial Court. He is later promoted to commander of the Scarlet Wraiths, part of the empire's intelligence agency. It is revealed that before he killed himself Dmitri secretly downloaded his consciousness into Arkady, so he could return six years later. This seems to have transferred Dmitri's Crest and its abilities to him as well. He is also killed in the final battle when Katrina Dante shoots him twice with the Huntsmans Rifle, however being that Dmitri stole his body, it could be argued that Arkady had been long dead before this.
  - Viktor – a mute, enigmatic loner whose crest transforms him into a Romanov eagle. Viktor forms a close bond with Dante early on. After Dmitri (as Arkady) murders his wife Galya, he renounces his birthright as a Romanov and, taking the name of Viktor Dante, joins Nikolai on a mission to bring about his father's downfall. His final act is to abandon his humanity and take eagle form permanently. He only says two words in the whole 15-year series: "Goodbye, Nikolai". This shows he was mute by choice. He, Lulu and Dante are the only Romanovs to survive the saga.

=== The Makarovs and their allies ===
- Tsar Vladimir the Conqueror – ruthless ruler of the Russian empire. Though he hates the Romanovs, he has feelings for Jocasta, and he retains these feelings through their family's wars. When they were younger, Vladimir, Jocasta and Dmitri liberated Russia from Tsar Ivan The Oppressor, who Vladimir strangled to death with his bare hands. When Vladimir proposes to Jocasta and declares himself the new Tsar, Dmitri is angered because he believes only Romanovs have the right to be Tsars. Vladimir and Dimitri duel, and Vladimir wins. Jocasta rejects his proposal, recognising Vladimir's cruelty whilst he humiliated her brother, and says they can never be together. Vladimir is proud of his daughters, but acts with cruelty towards them when they are young to show them what they must do when they are rulers. He is the final antagonist to die in the saga after challenging Dante to a game of Russian Roulette.
- Tsarina Eugenia (Jena) Vladimirovna Makarova – the tsar's eldest daughter and Dante's on again-off again love interest. She has a love-hate relationship with Dante, both attracted to him and disgusted with his flings with other women. A capable commander, she plays a major role in her father's empire, and eventually, she grows disenchanted with the empire to throw in with Dante's rebellion.
- Lady Juliana Makarov – the tsar's younger daughter. When she is killed by Konstantin Romanov, her death starts the civil war.
- Count Pyre – shape-changing alien, Lord Protector of the tsar and commander of the Scarlet Wraiths. Killed by Dante and replaced by Arkady and Konstantin Romanov.
- The Lord Protector – a mysterious armoured warrior who serves the tsar, he kills several members of the Romanovs. The Lord Protector reveals himself to be Konstantin Romanov, joining Tsar Vladimir The Conqueror to get his revenge when Dante tries to kill him.
- Mikhal Deriabin – head of the House of Bolshoi. He intended to marry Jena in a marriage arranged by her father, Tsar Vladimir the Conqueror. He secretly conspired with Sir Richard Hawksmoor (former tsarist warrior) to kidnap Princess Jena and start a civil war between Tsar Vladimir the Conqueror and the Romanovs so they could take power when the war was over. Unfortunately for both of them, Princess Jena's bodyguard was Nikolai Dante.
- The Arbatov family – male members of the family always seem to be on the wrong end of Dante's escapades.

=== The Rudinshtein Irregulars ===
During the war, Dante is given command of a regiment raised in his own fiefdom, Rudinshtein. Initially made up of regular soldiers, the regiment is eventually supplemented by troops drawn from penal military units.

- Sergeant Elena Kurakin – half Russian, half Mongolian swordswoman, she was imprisoned for killing her superior officer for cowardice. Following the war, she is captured by the tsar and sent to a gulag, where she is later freed by Dante, who makes her his bodyguard.
- Lord Peter Flintlock – a former British officer and a somewhat foppish coward. He survives the war and later (along with Spatchcock) joins Dante's pirate crew. Killed in the final battle.
- Private Yuri Spatchcock – described as the filthiest man in the empire due to his complete lack of personal hygiene and lack of trustworthiness. Survives the final battle and lands somewhat on his feet, embarking on a whirlwind romance with Lady Felicity Flintlock, wild child of London Town and sister of his late friend Lord Peter, and making off with a sizeable proportion of the Flintlock family valuables.
- The Grozny Gang – a family of violent criminals who are drafted into the Irregulars.
  - Boris Grozny – eldest member and leader of the gang.
  - Foma "the Coma" Grozny – a fragment of metal in his brain makes him impervious to pain.
  - Ursa Grozny – the only female in the gang.

=== Other recurring characters ===
- Katarina Dante – pirate queen and Dante's mother. abandoning Nikolai as a child, because of her all-female pirate crew, years later Nikolai discovers he is the result of rape by Dimitri Romanov, after the civil war Nikolai joins her crew, she later joins Nikolai's revolutionary army, during the final battle she is fatally wounded by Vladimir, she survives long enough to kill Dimitri.
- The Countessa de Winter – a beautiful and manipulative con-artist. She first meets Dante when he is trying to rob the Hotel Yalta and she manages to steal the jewels from him, after which they pull a heist on the Church of the Skoptsy. She cheats him out of the jewels from "the Romanov Job" then, years later, she hires the Solnkin Assassin Society to start a war between Tsar Vladimir the Conqueror and Papa Yeltsin so she can take over Yeltsin's criminal empire and New Moscow.
- Eloise de Janissaire – the leader of the mercenary Warlords and Dante's wife. Killed by Valentine Romanov.
- Akita Sagawa – a Japanese yakuza leader. Killed by The Kraken.
- The Kraken – the leader of the Pacific Rievers, killed by the Lord Protector.
- Alexander "Papa" Yeltsin – the leader of the criminal elements in New Moscow. Killed by Dimitri Romanov.
- Lauren Stone – Dante's childhood sweetheart (though Dante describes her as "more like the girl next ship"). Killed during the Battle of St. Petersburg.
- Henry Winsdor Mckray – The legendary "Mad King" of Britannia and close friend of Nikolai Dante. He believes Nikolai is an attractive woman.
- Princess Marie-Anne – King Henry's scheming daughter, constantly trying to overthrow her father, her plans are always being thwarted by Nikolai Dante.
- Major Liberty – the leader of the Amerikan rebels in Imperial-occupied Russia.

=== Other characters and imperial factions ===
- The White Army and the Red Guard – warring factions from a parallel dimension, the White Army created the Weapons Crest technology, while the Red Guard fight to preserve their humanity. In Sword of the Tsar, the White Army has begun inserting themselves into Dante's dimension. Their agents claim to have defeated the Red Guard.
- Lieutenant Khara – A female member of the Red Guard, she first meets Dante when Dmitri orders him to take her to the planet Samovar, one of the Romanov Dynasty's off-world territories, and the harshest prison colony in the empire, Khara explains to Dante that long ago the Red Guard and Dimitri Romanov made a deal, the Red Guard gave the Romanovs the technology for their weapon crests and in return, Dimitri sent prisoners to fight for the Red Guard after they created a portal between there dimensions, Khara gives Dante The Huntsman's Rifle 5000, as a gift for saving her life, some years later Khara returns to Dante's dimension, turning out to have joined the White Army, who now plan to conqueror his dimension, Dante kills her after she tries to assassinate Tsar Vladimir.
- Jason Futura – former weapons designer, founder and CEO of Futura Consciousness, a Virtual Reality company that most Amerikans use to escape the depression of the Russian occupation, Tsar Vladimir The Conqueror plans to withdraw his forces from the country, and Futura its first President in 50 years (though it is made clear he'll be a puppet President), Futura turns out to be a member of the White Army, who have integrated themselves into Amerikan society, so they can overrun the country, he is defeated when Dante and the Amerikan Insurgents team up and stop him.
- Sir Richard Hawksmoore – former Tsarist warrior turned mercenary, obsessed with Jena Makarov. He secretly conspires with Mikhail Deriabin to kidnap Jena and start a civil war between Tsar Vladimir the Conqueror and the Romanovs so they can take power when the war is over. Unfortunately for both of them, Dante goes as Jena's personal bodyguard.
- Major Elizabeth Hawksmoore- daughter of Sir Richard Hawksmoore. She is arrested after she kills a member of the Arbatov family, but Arkady Romanov makes her head of the Order of the Dragon, the greatest strike force in the empire. She is killed by Sergeant Elena Kurakin in the final battle, when she tells Kurakin that she killed her father.
- Captain Luther Emmanuel – former agent of Britannia Intelligence and member of the Cadre Infernale. A powerful psionic, he uses his abilities both to interrogate prisoners and swindle casinos. After the war, he supports Lulu Romanov's terror campaign before being captured and killed by the Lord Protector.
- Odessa Zhiriovsky A young girl with the power to see into the future, because of this Tsar Vladimir The Conqueror adopts her, making her call him Uncle Vlad, using her powers to gain the upper hand on everyone, however when Dante tries to kill him after he destroys New York City, angered by the fact she didn't warn him about this, he has the Lord Protector blind her, when the revolutionary army overthrows Vladimir she is given robot eyes, however can no longer see into the future, she then writes the definitive autobiography of Nikolai Dante called Too Cool To Kill.
- Jim Di Grisov – Legendary con artist, thief and tutor of Nikolai Dante in the thieves' world. His name is an homage to The Stainless Steel Rat, Slippery Jim DiGriz.

== Bibliography ==
British computer games company and comic book publisher Rebellion Developments collected the entire saga into a series of trade paperbacks.

- Nikolai Dante: The Romanov Dynasty (November 2004, ISBN 1-904265-20-0), republished as Nikolai Dante: Too Cool to Kill (July 2011, ISBN 9781907519895):
  - "The Adventures of Nikolai Dante" (with Simon Fraser, in 2000 AD #1035–1041, 1997)
  - "The Romanov Dynasty" (with Simon Fraser, in 2000 AD #1042–1049, 1997)
  - "Russia's Greatest Love Machine" (with Chris Weston, in 2000 AD #1066, 1997)
  - "The Gentleman Thief" (with Simon Fraser, in 2000 AD #1067–1070, 1997)
  - "The Full Dante" (with Charlie Adlard, in 2000 AD #1071, 1997)
  - "Moscow Duellists" (with Simon Fraser, in 2000 AD #1072–1075, 1997)
  - "The Gulag Apocalyptic" (with Henry Flint, in 2000 AD #1079–1082, 1998)
- Nikolai Dante: The Great Game (March 2005, ISBN 1-904265-32-4):
  - "The Trouble with Arbatovs" (with Simon Fraser, in 2000 AD #1083, 1998)
  - "Cruel Britannia" (with Simon Fraser, in 2000 AD #1084, 1998)
  - "The Great Game" (with Simon Fraser, in 2000 AD #1101–1110, 1998)
  - "The Octobriana Seduction" (with Andy Clarke, in 2000 AD #1113–1116, 1998)
  - "Masque of Dante" (with Charlie Adlard, in 2000 AD #1125–1127, 1999)
  - "The Moveable Feast" (with Simon Fraser, in 2000 AD #1128–1130, 1999)
  - "Tour of Duty" (with Charlie Adlard, in 2000 AD #1131–1133, 1999)
  - "The Cadre Infernale" (with Simon Fraser, in 2000 AD #1134–1137, 1999)
  - "The Hunting Party" (with Andy Clarke, in 2000 AD #1139–1140, 1999)
- Nikolai Dante: The Courtship of Jena Makarov (January 2006, ISBN 1-904265-44-8), republished as Nikolai Dante: Love and War (October 2014, ISBN 9781781082614):
  - "Fists of Fury" (with Charlie Adlard, in 2000 AD #1141, 1999)
  - "Last Dance on the Trans-Siberian Express" (with Charlie Adlard, in 2000 AD #1142–1143, 1999)
  - "Cruel Seas" (with John Burns, in 2000 AD #1148–1149, 1999)
  - "Requiem for Lost Love" (with John Burns, in 2000 AD #1150, 1999)
  - "The Courtship of Jena Makarov " (with Simon Fraser, in 2000 AD #1161–1172, 1999)
  - "Love and War" (with Simon Fraser, in 2000 AD Prog 2000,^{[a]} 1999)
- Nikolai Dante: Tsar Wars Volume 1 (September 2006, ISBN 1-904265-95-2):
  - "Rudinshtein Irregulars " (with John Burns, in 2000 AD #1183–1190, 2000)
  - "Love and War" (with John Burns, in 2000 AD #1200–1207, 2000)
  - "Battleship Potemkin" (with Simon Fraser, in 2000 AD #1213–1220, 2000)
- Nikolai Dante: Tsar Wars Volume 2 (March 2007, ISBN 1-905437-24-2):
  - "One Last Night in the House of Sin" (with John Burns, in 2000 AD Prog 2001,^{[a]} 2000)
  - "The Beguiling" (with Steve Yeowell in 2000 AD #1234–1235, 2001)
  - "Fiends" (with Steve Yeowell in 2000 AD #1236–1239, 2001)
  - "The Romanov Empire" (with John Burns, in 2000 AD #1250–1262, 2001)
- Nikolai Dante: Hell and High Water (April 2008, ISBN 9781905437597):
  - "The Return of the Gentleman Thief" (with Simon Fraser, in 2000 AD Prog 2002^{[a]} and #1273–1274, 2001–2002)
  - "The Romanov Job" (with Simon Fraser, in 2000 AD #1280–1287, 2002)
  - "Hell and High Water" (with John Burns, in 2000 AD Prog 2003^{[a]} and #1322–1328, 2002–2003)
  - "The Sea Falcon" (with John Burns, in 2000 AD Prog 2004,^{[a]} 2003)
  - "Agent of Destruction" (with John Burns, in 2000 AD Prog 2005^{[a]} and #1420–1427, 2004–2005)
- Nikolai Dante: Sword of the Tsar (July 2008, ISBN 978-1-905437-69-6):
  - "How could you believe me when I said I loved you when you know I've been a liar all my life?" (with John Burns, in 2000 AD #1428–1431, 2005)
  - "Primal Screams" (with John Burns, in 2000 AD #1433–1436, 2005)
  - "Devil's Deal" (with John Burns, in 2000 AD Prog 2006,^{[a]} 2005)
  - "Usurper" (with John Burns, in 2000 AD #1487–1489, 2006)
  - "The Depths" (with John Burns, in 2000 AD #1500–1501, 2006)
  - "Dragon's Island" (with John Burns, in 2000 AD #1502–1507, 2006)
  - "Sword of the Tsar" (with Simon Fraser, in 2000 AD #1511–1516, 2006)
- Nikolai Dante: The Beast of Rudinshtein (February 2009, ISBN 978-1-905437-92-4):
  - "The Road of Bones" (with John Burns, in 2000 AD Prog 2007,^{[a]} 2006)
  - "Deadlier than the Male" (with John Burns, in 2000 AD #1518–1520, 2007)
  - "Hellfire" (with Simon Fraser, in 2000 AD #1526–1531, 2007)
  - "The Beast of Rudinshtein" (with John Burns, in 2000 AD #1532–1535, 2007)
  - "The Dissenter" (with John Burns, in 2000 AD #1537, 2007)
  - "Thieves' World" (with Simon Fraser, in 2000 AD #1538–1544, 2007)
  - "The Chaperone" (with John Burns, in 2000 AD #1560–1564, 2007)
  - "Destiny's Child" (with John Burns, in 2000 AD Prog 2008,^{[a]} 2007)
  - "The Tsar's Daughter" (with John Burns, in 2000 AD #1578–1580, 2008)
- Nikolai Dante: Amerika (January 2010, ISBN 978-1-906735-12-8):
  - "Amerika" (with Simon Fraser, in 2000 AD #1589–1599, 2008)
  - "Prisoner of the Tsar" (with John Burns, in 2000 AD #1612–1616, 2008)
  - "Bring Me the Head of Nikolai Dante" (with John Burns, in 2000 AD Prog 2009,^{[a]} 2008)
  - "An Army of Thieves and Whores" (with Simon Fraser, in 2000 AD #1629–1634, 2009)
  - "Lulu's War" (with Paul Marshall, in 2000 AD #1651–1654, 2009)
- Nikolai Dante: Hero of the Revolution (July 2011, ISBN 978-1-907992-22-3):
  - "Hero of the Revolution" (with John Burns, in 2000 AD Prog 2010,^{[a]} #1666–1675, 2009–2010)
  - "Heroes Be Damned" (with Simon Fraser, in 2000 AD #1679–1684, 2010)
  - "A Farewell to Arms" (with Simon Fraser, in 2000 AD #1685, 2010)
  - "City of the Damned" (with Simon Fraser, in 2000 AD #1700–1704, 2010)
  - "The Master of Kronstadt" (with John Burns in 2000 AD #1705–1708, 2010)
- Nikolai Dante: Sympathy For the Devil (October 2012, ISBN 978-1-78108-073-3):
  - "The Memoirs of Nikolai Dante" (with Simon Fraser, in 2000 AD #1731, 2011)
  - "Bad Blood" (with Simon Fraser, in 2000 AD #1732–1736, 2011)
  - "The Wedding of Jena Makarov" (with Simon Fraser, in 2000 AD #2012,1764–1773, 2012)
  - "The Dante Gambit" (with John Burns, in 2000 AD #1774–1779, 2012)
  - "Sympathy for the Devil" (with Simon Fraser, in 2000 AD #1786–1791, 2012)

In February 2017 a one-off new story was published (set during the series early years) in the comic's 40th-anniversary special issue:

- "Devil May Care" (with Simon Fraser)

a. This Prog was a special edition outside the comic's normal numbering scheme released to mark the start of a new year. An issue with the equivalent issue number was published within the comic's normal numbering scheme years later.

== Cultural references ==
- The title of one of the stories, Russia's Greatest Love Machine, is taken from a lyric from the Boney M. song "Rasputin" about the mystic Grigori Rasputin who, in the 1900s and 1910s, was an associate of the real Romanovs, including Tsar Nicholas II and the healer of Nicholas' son, Tsarevich Alexei.
- In The Great Game we are introduced to Agent Kaine, a parody of Harry Palmer as played by Michael Caine. This is not the first time 2000 AD has parodied Michael Caine; in Bix Barton the eponymous hero had a sentient walking stick as a companion called Michael Cane.
- In The Octobriana Seduction a version of Octobriana appears.
- In The Hunting Party, Sinister Dexter and Slaine appear as thinly disguised parodies.
- In The Romanov Job, there are cameo appearances by thinly disguised characters from other comics including:
  - The Spider – "Abel Ganz, The Tarantula, Anarchist, Assassin and all-round master criminal"
  - Janus Stark – "Janos Starak, escapologist extraordinaire"
  - Catwoman – "Selina Solaris, The Panther"
  - Crusher Creel – "Grushko Kreel"
  - Luther Arkwright – Captain Luther Emmanuel
- The "bio-weapon" creature who appears in "Agent of Destruction" is a version of the monster from the Phantoms film and novel.
- Captain America is lampshaded in the story Amerika, projectile shield and all, by the character Major Liberty. This installment of the Dante saga also references NBA team the New Jersey Nets before their move to Brooklyn. The pre-Brooklyn logo is featured on the front of the President Shawn C Carter Memorial Stadium – itself a reference to the rapper Jay-Z, who owned a stake in both the team and its arena at the time; both have since been sold on to other parties. The terrorists who appear on the start pages are versions of Thing and Human Torch from Fantastic Four.
- In Devil May Care, there is a parody of Black Widow called "Scarlet Spider".

== Other media ==
=== Novels ===
A number of Nikolai Dante novels have been written by David Bishop and published by Black Flame. Each is a new Dante story, set in between events depicted by the comic serials. The first novel, The Strangelove Gambit, details Dante's misadventures as a tutor in a boarding school for young ladies that hides a deadly secret. In the second, Imperial Black, Dante is forced to seek out an ancient citadel on the roof of the world. The final Dante novel to date, Honour Be Damned, is a romp set in future Britain that spoofs "The 39 Steps".

They include:

- From Russia with Lust: The Nikolai Dante Omnibus (672 pages, March 2007, ISBN 1-84416-454-3):
  - The Strangelove Gambit (January 2005, ISBN 1-84416-139-0)
  - Imperial Black (August 2005, ISBN 1-84416-180-3)
  - Honour Be Damned (March 2006, ISBN 1-84416-324-5)
