= Robbie Morrison =

British comic book writer

- Born: Helensburgh, Dunbartonshire, Scotland
- Area: Writer
- Notable works: Shimura; Nikolai Dante; White Death; The Authority

Robbie Morrison is a Scottish comic book writer known for his work in the weekly anthology 2000 AD, where he co-created the long-running serial Nikolai Dante with artist Simon Fraser.

== Career ==
Morrison began his career in 2000 AD's sister title Judge Dredd Megazine, writing various spin-off stories for the titular character, including Shimura, which he co-created with Frank Quitely. Aside from Nikolai Dante, Morrison's work for 2000 AD itself includes Shakara with art by Henry Flint and contributions to various long-running series of short strips such as Tharg's Future Shocks, Vector 13 and Pulp Sci-Fi. In 2002, Morrison made his debut at the Big Two of the American comic book market with an issue of Spider-Man's Tangled Web, drawn by Jim Mahfood. The following year, he launched the second volume of The Authority at Wildstorm following the acclaimed runs by Warren Ellis and Mark Millar, while Morrison's idea of having the titular team take over the world was used as the basis for the company-wide crossover "Coup d'Etat".

In 2011, Morrison wrote the comic book tie-in to the video game Deus Ex: Human Revolution. The following year, he was brought in by Dave Gibbons to work on the motion comic Treatment, developing Gibbons' initial idea into a number of serials. In 2013, publisher Jonathan Cape released Drowntown, the first part of a trilogy of graphic novels with art by Jim Murray. From 2014 to 2017, Morrison wrote the ongoing Doctor Who series featuring the adventures of the Twelfth Doctor for Titan Comics. In addition to his work as a writer, Morrison has acted as a consultant for the Scottish Arts Council, promoting the medium of comics. In a 2005 interview in Judge Dredd Megazine, he stated that he is interested in creating work that would revive genres other than science, fantasy and superhero fiction.

In 2021, Morrison published his first prose novel, Edge of the Grave, which earned him the Bloody Scotland Debut Prize for Crime Novel. The second book in the Inspector Jimmy Dreghorn series, Cast a Cold Eye, was released in March 2023.

== Awards ==
- 2002: Won "Best Character" Eagle Award, for Nikolai Dante
- Bloody Scotland Award (2021) for his crime fiction contributions

== Bibliography ==
=== UK publishers ===
- Judge Dredd Megazine (anthology, Fleetway/Rebellion):
  - Judge Hershey:
    - "The Not-So-Merry Wives of Windsor" (with Xuasus, in vol. 2 #12, 1992)
    - "Asylum" (with Siku, in vol. 2 #25–26, 1993)
  - Brit-Cit Brute:
    - "Brit-Cit Brute" (with Nick Percival, in vol. 2 #31–33, 1993)
    - "Trilogy: Phantom of the Octaves!" (with Nick Percival, in vol. 2 #60, 1994)
    - "Trilogy: Freud on Brit-Cit!" (with Xuasus, in vol. 2 #61, 1994)
    - "Trilogy: The Phantom Knicker-Knocker of Old London Block!" (with David Millgate, in vol. 2 #62, 1994)
  - Inspector Shimura:
    - Shimura (tpb, 224 pages, DC Comics, 2004, ISBN 1-4012-0397-3) collects:
      - "Shimura" (with Frank Quitely, in vol. 2 #37–39, 1993)
      - "Outcast" (with Colin MacNeil, in vol. 2 #50–55, 1994)
      - "Fearful Symmetry" (with Duke Mighten, in vol. 2 #72, 1995)
      - "Chambara" (with Robert McCallum, in vol. 2 #73, 1995)
      - "The Transcendental Assassin" (with Simon Fraser, in vol. 2 #74, 1995)
      - "Assassins" (with Robert McCallum and Simon Fraser, in vol. 2 #76–77, 1995)
      - "Dragonfire" (with Simon Fraser, in vol. 3 #14–17, 1996)
      - A Judge Dredd story featuring Shimura:
        - "Web" (with Cyril Julien, in vol. 3 #19, 1996)
      - Two spin-off tales starring Judge Inspector Inaba:
        - "Babes with Big Bazookas" (with Frank Quitely, in vol. 3 #26, 1996)
        - "Big Lix and Flying Kicks" (with Dylan Teague, in vol. 3 #37–38, 1998)
      - "Ronin Breed" (with Simon Fraser, in vol. 3 #34, 1997)
    - "Heavy Metal" (with Duke Mighten, in vol. 2 #75, 1995)
    - "Scary Monsters" (with LOL, in vol. 3 #35, 1997)
    - Hondo City Law (tpb, 160 pages, Simon & Schuster, 2011, ISBN 1-907519-91-2) includes:
      - "Executioner" (with Andy Clarke, in #224–226, 2004)
      - "Deus X" (with Andy Clarke, in #228–230, 2005)
    - "The Harder They Come" (with Colin MacNeil, in #238–243, 2005) collected in Hondo City Justice (tpb, 160 pages, Simon & Schuster, 2014, ISBN 1-78108-249-9)
  - Judge Dredd:
    - "It's a Dreddful Life" (co-written by Morrison and Jim Alexander, art by Colin MacNeil, in vol. 2 #44–45, 1993–1994) collected in Judge Dredd: The Complete Case Files Volume 20 (tpb, 320 pages, 2013, ISBN 1-78108-141-7)
    - Judge Dredd: The Complete Case Files Volume 23 (tpb, 320 pages, 2014, ISBN 1-78108-252-9) includes:
      - "Face of Justice" (with Steve Sampson, in vol. 2 #83, 1995)
      - "The Wall" (with Tom Carney, in vol. 3 #2, 1995)
    - Judge Dredd: The Complete Case Files Volume 24 (tpb, 320 pages, 2015, ISBN 1-78108-339-8) includes:
      - "Stalking the Law" (with Ashley Sanders, in vol. 3 #4, 1995)
      - "Compassion Fatigue" (with Simon Davis, in vol. 3 #8, 1995)
      - "High Octane" (with Ray Bryant, in vol. 3 #13, 1996)
    - "Control" (with Paul Peart, in vol. 3 #18, 1996) collected in Judge Dredd: The Complete Case Files Volume 25 (tpb, 320 pages, 2015, ISBN 1-78108-331-2)
    - "Warriors" (with Jack Couvella and Andrew Currie (#33), in vol. 3 #31–33, 1997) collected in Judge Dredd: The Complete Case Files Volume 26 (tpb, 320 pages, 2016, ISBN 1-78108-431-9)
    - "Word of the Law" (with Richard Elson, in vol. 3 #74, 2001) collected in Judge Dredd: The Complete Case Files Volume 33 (tpb, 272 pages, 2019, ISBN 1-78108-677-X)
    - Judge Dredd: The Complete Case Files Volume 44 (tpb, 304 pages, 2024, ISBN 1-83786-167-6) includes:
      - "Shadowkill" (with Lee Garbett, in #254–255, 2007)
      - "Streetfighting Man" (with Henry Flint, in #258–259, 2007)
    - Judge Dredd: The Complete Case Files Volume 45 (tpb, 304 pages, 2024, ISBN 1-83786-256-7) includes:
      - "Tribal" (with Tan Eng Huat, in #264, 2007)
      - "Blood Money" (with Smudge, in #268, 2008)
    - "MindRipper" (with Neil Googe, in #272, 2008) collected in Judge Dredd: The Complete Case Files Volume 46 (tpb, 304 pages, 2025, ISBN 1-83786-426-8)
    - "Snakebite" (with Kev Walker, in #289–290, 2009) collected in Judge Dredd: The Complete Case Files Volume 48 (tpb, 304 pages, 2025, ISBN 1-83786-607-4)
    - "Dog Soldiers" (with Leigh Gallagher, in #293–294, 2010) collected in Judge Dredd: The Complete Case Files Volume 49 (tpb, 304 pages, 2026, ISBN 1-83786-671-6)
    - Judge Dredd: The Complete Case Files Volume 52 (tpb, 304 pages, 2027, ISBN 1-83786-907-3) includes:
      - "The Guile Show" (with Gary Erskine, in #321–322, 2012)
      - "Great Executions" (with Dave Taylor, in #325–327, 2012)
    - "Fifty Shades of Crime" (with Patrick Goddard, in #341, 2013)
  - Wynter: "Cold Justice" (with Kev Walker, in vol. 2 #70, 1995)
  - Maelstrom (with Colin MacNeil, in vol. 2 #73–80, 1995)
  - Alien in a Girls' Dorm (with Stuart Mack, in vol. 3 #11, 1995)
  - DeMarco, P. I.:
    - "Ways to Die" (with Laurence Campbell, in vol. 3 #70–71, 2000)
    - "Deep Blue Death" (with Steve Yeowell, in vol. 4 #3–5, 2001)
    - "The Fierce and the Furious" (with Steve Yeowell, in vol. 4 #6–8, 2002)
  - The Bendatti Vendetta (with John Burns):
    - The Bendatti Vendetta (tpb, 128 pages, 2011, ISBN 1-907519-86-6) collects:
      - "Vendetta in Light" (in vol. 4 #13–18, 2002)
      - "Blooded" (in #209–211, 2003)
      - "See Naples and Die" (in #234–236, 2005)
  - Hondo City Justice (featuring Judge Inspector Inaba):
    - "Hondo City Justice" (with Neil Googe, in #300–303, 2010) collected in Hondo City Law (tpb, 160 pages, Simon & Schuster, 2011, ISBN 1-907519-91-2)
    - Hondo City Justice (tpb, 160 pages, Simon & Schuster, 2014, ISBN 1-78108-249-9) includes:
      - "Project Behemoth" (with Mike Collins, in #324–326, 2012)
      - "Revenge of the 47 Ronin" (with Mike Collins, in #332–334, 2013)
- 2000 AD (anthology, Fleetway/Rebellion):
  - Judge Dredd:
    - "Kinky Boots" (with Paul Grist, in Judge Dredd Mega-Special #6, 1993) collected in Judge Dredd: The Restricted Files Volume 3 (tpb, 288 pages, 2011, ISBN 1-907992-21-9)
    - Judge Dredd: The Restricted Files Volume 4 (tpb, 272 pages, 2012, ISBN 1-78108-046-1) includes:
      - "Sinned-In City" (with Adrian Salmon and Jim Vickers, in Judge Dredd Mega-Special #7, 1994)
      - "Devil Man" (with Jim Vickers) and "Fat Bottom Boys" (with John Hicklenton, in Judge Dredd Mega-Special #8, 1995)
      - "Tales from the Pit: Black Day at Bad Rock" (with Christian Bravery and Jack Couvella, in Sci-Fi Special '96, 1996)
    - Judge Dredd: The Complete Case Files Volume 33 (tpb, 272 pages, 2019, ISBN 1-78108-677-X) includes:
      - "Something Over My Shoulder is Drooling" (with Simon Fraser, in #1226, 2001)
      - "Relentless" (with Colin Wilson, in #1237–1239, 2001)
      - "Hellbent" (with Colin Wilson, in #1242, 2001)
    - Judge Dredd: The Complete Case Files Volume 34 (tpb, 272 pages, 2019, ISBN 1-78108-691-5) includes:
      - "Cheating Drokkers" (with John Burns, in #1272, 2001)
      - "Born Under a Bad Sign" (with Peter Doherty, in #1275, 2002)
    - "Wallcrawlers" (with Robert McCallum, in #1279, 2002) collected in Judge Dredd: The Complete Case Files Volume 35 (tpb, 272 pages, 2020, ISBN 1-78108-760-1)
    - "Hard Day's Night" (with Patrick Goddard, in #1239–1241, 2003) collected in Judge Dredd: The Complete Case Files Volume 37 (tpb, 288 pages, 2021, ISBN 1-78108-897-7)
    - Judge Dredd: The Complete Case Files Volume 42 (tpb, 288 pages, 2023, ISBN 1-78618-709-4) includes:
      - "Nobody" (with Richard Elson, in #1467, 2005)
      - "Straight Eye for the Crooked Guy" (with Michael Avon Oeming, in Prog 2006, 2005)
    - Judge Dredd: The Complete Case Files Volume 44 (tpb, 304 pages, 2024, ISBN 1-83786-167-6) includes:
      - "The Incident" (with Richard Elson, in #1538, 2007)
      - "Shaggy's Big Shoot" (with Mike McMahon, in #1539, 2007)
      - "Cycle of Violence" (with Cliff Robinson, in #1549, 2007)
    - "Nuked!" (with Ian Gibson, in #1576, 2008) collected in Judge Dredd: The Complete Case Files Volume 45 (tpb, 304 pages, 2024, ISBN 1-83786-256-7)
    - Judge Dredd: The Complete Case Files Volume 46 (tpb, 304 pages, 2025, ISBN 1-83786-426-8) includes:
      - "Blindside" (with Richard Elson, in #1596–1599, 2008)
      - "Firestorm" (with Sam Hart, in #1604–1606, 2008)
      - "The Informant" (with Paul Marshall, in #1607, 2008)
    - "Tour of Duty: Lust in the Dust" (with Jon Haward, in #1672–1673, 2010) collected in Judge Dredd: The Complete Case Files Volume 48 (tpb, 304 pages, 2025, ISBN 1-83786-607-4)
    - "Heller's Last Stand" (with Peter Doherty, in #1813–1815, 2013)
  - Judge Hershey:
    - "Hov-Bus Blues" (with Darren Stephens, in Judge Dredd Mega-Special #6, 1993)
    - "Naked and Unashamed" (with Paul Peart, in Judge Dredd Yearbook '94, 1993) collected in Judge Dredd: The XXX Files (tpb, 224 pages, Simon & Schuster, 2014, ISBN 1-78108-243-X)
  - Judge Inspector Inaba: "Sumos and Sporrans" (with David Millgate, in Judge Dredd Mega-Special #7, 1994)
  - Tharg's Future Shocks: "The Subliminals" (with David Millgate, in #927, 1995)
  - Inspector Shimura: "Angels of Death" (with LOL, in Judge Dredd Mega-Special #9, 1996)
  - Havok (with Robert McCallum, free supplements to #1021–1024, 1026, 1028, 1032, 1036, 1996–1997)
  - Nikolai Dante:
    - Nikolai Dante: The Romanov Dynasty (tpb, 192 pages, DC Comics, 2004, ISBN 1-4012-0395-7) collects:
      - "Nikolai Dante" (with Simon Fraser, in #1035–1041, 1997)
      - "The Romanov Dynasty" (with Simon Fraser, in #1042–1049, 1997)
      - "Russia's Greatest Love Machine" (with Spaceboy, in #1066, 1997)
      - "The Gentleman Thief" (with Simon Fraser, in #1067–1070, 1997)
      - "The Full Dante" (with Charlie Adlard, in #1071, 1997)
      - "Moscow Duellists" (with Simon Fraser, in #1072–1075, 1997)
      - "The Gulag Apocalyptic" (with Henry Flint, in #1079–1082, 1998)
    - Nikolai Dante: The Great Game (tpb, 192 pages, DC Comics, 2005, ISBN 1-4012-0581-X) collects:
      - "The Trouble with Arbatovs" (with Simon Fraser, in #1083, 1998)
      - "Cruel Britannia" (with Simon Fraser, in #1084, 1998)
      - "The Great Game" (with Simon Fraser, in #1101–1110, 1998)
      - "The Octobriana Seduction" (with Andy Clarke, in #1113–1116, 1998)
      - "The Masque of Dante" (with Charlie Adlard, in #1125–1127, 1998–1999)
      - "The Moveable Feast" (with Simon Fraser, in #1128–1130, 1999)
      - "Tour of Duty" (with Charlie Adlard, in #1131–1133, 1999)
      - "The Cadre Infernale" (with Simon Fraser, in #1134–1137, 1999)
      - "The Hunting Party" (with Andy Clarke, in #1139–1140, 1999)
    - Nikolai Dante: The Courtship of Jena Makarov (tpb, 136 pages, 2005, ISBN 1-904265-44-8) collects:
      - "Fists of Fury" (with Charlie Adlard, in #1141, 1999)
      - "Last Dance of the Trans-Siberian" (with Charlie Adlard, in #1142–1143, 1999)
      - "Cruel Seas" (with John Burns, in #1148–1149, 1999)
      - "Requiem for Lost Love" (with John Burns, in #1150, 1999)
      - "The Courtship of Jena Makarov" (with Simon Fraser, in #1161–1172, 1999)
      - "Love and War" (with Simon Fraser, in Prog 2000, 1999)
    - Nikolai Dante: Tsar Wars Volume 1 (tpb, 160 pages, 2006, ISBN 1-904265-95-2) collects:
      - "The Rudinshtein Irregulars " (with John Burns, in #1183–1190, 2000)
      - "Love and War" (with John Burns, in #1200–1207, 2000)
      - "Battleship Potemkin" (with Simon Fraser, in #1213–1220, 2000)
    - Nikolai Dante: Tsar Wars Volume 2 (tpb, 128 pages, 2007, ISBN 1-905437-24-2) collects:
      - "One Last Night in the House of Sin" (with John Burns, in Prog 2001, 2000)
      - "The Beguiling" (with Steve Yeowell, in #1234–1235, 2001)
      - "Fiends" (with Steve Yeowell, in #1236–1239, 2001)
      - "The Romanov Empire" (with John Burns, in #1250–1262, 2001)
    - Nikolai Dante: Hell and High Water (tpb, 192 pages, 2008, ISBN 1-905437-59-5) collects:
      - "The Return of the Gentleman Thief" (with Simon Fraser, in Prog 2002 and #1273–1274, 2001)
      - "The Romanov Job" (with Simon Fraser, in #1280–1287, 2002)
      - "Hell and High Water" (with John Burns, in Prog 2003 and #1322–1328, 2002–2003)
      - "The Sea Falcon" (with John Burns, in Prog 2004, 2003)
      - "Agent of Destruction" (with John Burns, in Prog 2005 and #1420–1427, 2004–2005)
    - Nikolai Dante: Sword of the Tsar (tpb, 192 pages, 2008, ISBN 1-905437-69-2) collects:
      - "How Could You Believe Me When I Said I Loved You When You Know I've Been a Liar All My Life?" (with John Burns, in #1428–1431, 2005)
      - "Primal Screams" (with John Burns, in #1433–1436, 2005)
      - "Devil's Deal" (with John Burns, in Prog 2006, 2005)
      - "Usurper" (with John Burns, in #1487–1489, 2006)
      - "The Depths" (with John Burns, in #1500–1501, 2006)
      - "Dragon's Island" (with John Burns, in #1502–1507, 2006)
      - "Sword of the Tsar" (with Simon Fraser, in #1511–1516, 2006)
    - Nikolai Dante: The Beast of Rudinshtein (tpb, 224 pages, 2009, ISBN 1-905437-92-7) collects:
      - "The Road of Bones" (with John Burns, in Prog 2007, 2006)
      - "Deadlier Than the Male" (with John Burns, in #1518–1520, 2007)
      - "Hellfire" (with Simon Fraser, in #1526–1531, 2007)
      - "The Beast of Rudinshtein" (with John Burns, in #1532–1535, 2007)
      - "The Dissenter" (with John Burns, in #1537, 2007)
      - "Thieves' World" (with Simon Fraser, in #1538–1544, 2007)
      - "The Chaperone" (with John Burns, in #1560–1564, 2007)
      - "Destiny's Child" (with John Burns, in Prog 2008, 2007)
      - "The Tsar's Daughter" (with John Burns, in #1578–1580, 2008)
    - Nikolai Dante: Amerika (tpb, 208 pages, 2009, ISBN 1-906735-12-3) collects:
      - "Amerika" (with Simon Fraser, in #1589–1599, 2008)
      - "Prisoner of the Tzar" (with John Burns, in #1612–1616, 2008)
      - "Bring Me the Head of Nikolai Dante" (with John Burns, in Prog 2009, 2008)
      - "An Army of Thieves and Whores" (with Simon Fraser and Tim Hamilton (#1934), in #1629–1934, 2009)
      - "Lulu's War" (with Paul Marshall, in #1651–1654, 2009)
    - Nikolai Dante: Hero of the Revolution (tpb, 192 pages, 2011, ISBN 1-907992-22-7) collects:
      - "Hero of the Revolution" (with John Burns, in Prog 2010 and #1666–1675, 2009–2010)
      - "Heroes be Damned" (with Simon Fraser, in #1679–1684, 2010)
      - "A Farewell to Arms" (with Simon Fraser, in #1685, 2010)
      - "City of the Damned" (with Simon Fraser, in #1700–1704, 2010)
      - "The Master of Kronstadt" (with John Burns, in #1705–1708, 2010)
    - Nikolai Dante: Sympathy for the Devil (tpb, 224 pages, 2012, ISBN 1-78108-073-9) collects:
      - "The Memoirs of Nikolai Dante" (with Simon Fraser, in #1731, 2011)
      - "Bad Blood" (with Simon Fraser, in #1732–1736, 2011)
      - "The Wedding of Jena Makarov" (with Simon Fraser, in Prog 2012 and #1764–1773, 2011–2012)
      - "The Dante Gambit" (with John Burns, in #1774–1779, 2012)
      - "Sympathy for the Devil" (with Simon Fraser, in #1786–1791, 2012)
  - Vector 13 (Series 5):
    - "Case Ten: Angels" (with Lee Sullivan, in #1071, 1997)
    - "Case Thirteen: Sands of Death" (with Alex Ronald, in #1074, 1997)
  - Pulp Sci-Fi:
    - "The Irydian Factor" (with Colin Wilson, in #1125, 1999)
    - "The Big Hit" (with Ben Willsher, in #1130, 1999)
    - "Female of the Species" (with Siku, in #1149, 1999)
    - "War of Words" (with Cliff Robinson, in #1159, 1999)
    - "Psico" (with Nigel Raynor, in #1160, 1999)
  - Vanguard (with Colin MacNeil, in #1212–1219, 2000)
  - Shakara (with Henry Flint):
    - Shakara: The Avenger (tpb, 176 pages, 2008, ISBN 1-907519-93-9) collects:
      - "Shakara" (in Prog 2002 and #1273–1279, 2001–2002) also collected as Shakara (hc, 56 pages, 2005, ISBN 1-904265-61-8)
      - "The Assassin" (in #1441–1449, 2005)
      - "The Defiant" (in Prog 2008 and #1567–1573, 2007–2008)
    - Shakara: The Destroyer (tpb, 160 pages, 2012, ISBN 1-78108-038-0) collects:
      - "Destroyer" (in #1650–1661, 2009)
      - "Avenger" (in Prog 2011 and #1715–1727, 2010–2011)
  - Tharg the Mighty: "A Night 2 Remember" (with Ian Gibson, one page in 2000 AD's 25th anniversary strip featuring a Halo Jones cameo, in #1280, 2002)
  - Marauder (with Richard Elson, in Prog 2009 and #1617–1627, 2008–2009) collected in Judge Dredd: The Cape and Cowl Crimes (tpb, 160 pages, Simon & Schuster, 2017, ISBN 1-78108-525-0)
- Judge Dredd: Lawman of the Future (anthology, Fleetway):
  - "Illustrated Assassin" (with Alex Ronald, in #3–4, 1995)
  - "Lawbreaker Blues" (with Jim Murray, in #5, 1995)
  - "The Lawmaster" (with Alex Ronald, in #6, 1995)
  - "Judge Death" (with Alex Ronald, in #8–10, 1995)
  - "Survival" (with Sean Longcroft, in #13–14, 1996)
  - "Dragon's Lair" (with Alex Ronald, in #14–16, 1996)
  - "Cybernetic Jungle" (with Geoff Senior, in #15–17, 1996)
  - "Cursed Earth" (with Jim O'Ready, in #17–18, 1996)
  - "Warlock" (with Alex Ronald, in #22, 1996)
  - "Mean and Meaner" (with Rob Davis, in Judge Dredd Action Special, 1996)
- Daily Star (daily newspaper strip featuring Judge Dredd, published by Reach plc):
  - "Day of the Dragon" (with Ron Smith, episodes #3439–3480, published from 28 March to 15 May 1997)
  - "Sexwar" (with David Bircham, episodes #3565–3606, published from 22 August to 9 October 1997)
  - "Shadows" (with Ron Smith, episodes #3649–3689, published from 28 November 1997 to 16 January 1998)
  - "Zoom Blitz" (with Charlie Adlard, episodes #3690–3731, published from 17 January to 6 March 1998)
- White Death (with Charlie Adlard, graphic novel, 96 pages, Les Cartoonistes Dangereux, 1998, ISBN 1-902429-00-1)
  - The graphic novel was first published in the United States by AiT/Planet Lar as White Death (sc, 96 pages, 2002, ISBN 0-9709360-6-0)
  - Reprinted, along with a new short story originally created for the French magazine Bo Dois, as White Death (hc, 104 pages, Image, 2014, ISBN 1-63215-142-1)
- Warhammer Monthly #12: "Grudgematch" (with Kev Hopgood, anthology, Black Library, 1999)
- Drowntown (with Jim Murray, graphic novel, 56 pages, Jonathan Cape, 2013, ISBN 0-224-08587-5)
- Doctor Who (Titan):
  - Doctor Who: The Twelfth Doctor:
    - Doctor Who: The Twelfth Doctor (with Dave Taylor (#1–5), Brian Williamson (#6–11), Daniel Indro (#12–13) and Ronilson Friere (#14–15), 2014–2016) collected as:
      - Terrorformer (collects #1–5, hc, 128 pages, 2015, ISBN 1-78276-177-2; tpb, 2016, ISBN 1-78585-361-9)
      - Fractures (collects #6–10, hc, 128 pages, 2015, ISBN 1-78276-301-5; tpb, 2016, ISBN 1-78276-659-6)
      - Hyperion (collects #11–15, hc, 128 pages, 2016, ISBN 1-78276-747-9; tpb, 2016, ISBN 1-78276-744-4)
      - The Complete Year One (collects #1–15, hc, 368 pages, 2017, ISBN 1-78586-401-7)
    - Doctor Who: The Twelfth Doctor Year Two (with Rachael Stott and Mariano Laclaustra (#11–13), 2016–2017) collected as:
      - The School of Death (collects #1–5, hc, 128 pages, 2016, ISBN 1-78585-108-X; tpb, 2017, ISBN 1-78585-107-1)
        - Includes the "Robo Rampage" short story (art by Simon Fraser) from Free Comic Book Day 2016: Doctor Who (anthology one-shot, 2016)
      - Sonic Boom (collects #11–15, hc, 112 pages, 2017, ISBN 1-78586-012-7; tpb, 2018, ISBN 1-78586-013-5)
  - Doctor Who: The Tenth Doctor #6–10 (with Daniel Indro and Eleonora Carlini (#10), 2015)
    - Collected as Doctor Who: The Tenth Doctor — The Weeping Angels of Mons (hc, 128 pages, 2015, ISBN 1-78276-175-6; tpb, 2016, ISBN 1-78276-657-X)
    - Collected in Doctor Who: The Tenth Doctor — The Complete Year One (hc, 368 pages, 2017, ISBN 1-78586-399-1)

=== US publishers ===
- Dark Horse Presents #91–93: "Blackheart" (with Frank Quitely, anthology, Dark Horse, 1994–1995)
- Spider-Man's Tangled Web #19: "Call of the Wild" (with Jim Mahfood, anthology, Marvel, 2002)
  - Collected in Spider-Man's Tangled Web Volume 4 (tpb, 176 pages, 2003, ISBN 0-7851-1064-X)
  - Collected in Spider-Man's Tangled Web Omnibus (hc, 560 pages, 2017, ISBN 1-302-90682-8)
- DC Comics:
  - The Authority (Wildstorm):
    - The Authority: Scorched Earth (with Frazer Irving, one-shot, Eye of the Storm, 2003)
    - The Authority vol. 2 (with Dwayne Turner, Tan Eng Huat (#5) and Whilce Portacio (#14), Eye of the Storm, 2003–2004) collected as:
      - Harsh Realities (collects #1–5, tpb, 144 pages, 2004, ISBN 1-4012-0278-0)
        - Includes the "High Stakes" prelude serial (art by Dwayne Turner) from Stormwatch: Team Achilles #9 + Sleeper #3 + Wildcats Version 3.0 #8 (2003)
      - Fractured Worlds (collects #6–14, tpb, 206 pages, 2005, ISBN 1-4012-0300-0)
    - Coup d'Etat #4 (of 4) (with Whilce Portacio, Eye of the Storm, 2004) collected in Coup d'Etat (tpb, 112 pages, 2004, ISBN 1-4012-0570-4)
  - Batman:
    - Batman: Gotham Knights #59: "Fire and Ice" (with Charlie Adlard, 2005) collected in Batman Arkham: Mister Freeze (tpb, 228 pages, 2017, ISBN 1-4012-6887-0)
    - Solo #12: "Lionel Percival (1932–2006)" (co-written by Morrison and Brendan McCarthy, art by McCarthy, anthology, 2006) collected in Solo (hc, 608 pages, 2013, ISBN 1-4012-3889-0)
  - Wildcats: Nemesis #1–9 (with Talent Caldwell, Horacio Domingues and Andy Smith (#6), Wildstorm, 2005–2006) collected as Wildcats: Nemesis (tpb, 208 pages, 2006, ISBN 1-4012-1105-4)
  - Deus Ex: Human Revolution #1–6 (with Trevor Hairsine and Sergio Sandoval, 2011)
    - A collected edition was solicited for a 2011 release but subsequently cancelled: Deus Ex (tpb, 144 pages, ISBN 1-4012-3149-7)
- Treatment (scripted by Morrison based on the concept by Dave Gibbons, series of digital/motion comics published via Madefire):
  - Treatment: Mexico City #1–2 (with Doug Braithwaite, 2012)
  - Treatment: Tokyo #1–3 (with Kinman Chan, 2012–2013)
  - Treatment: Seoul #1–2 (with Denys Cowan, 2014)
- Image:
  - Traces of the Great War: "Without a Trace..." (with Charlie Adlard, anthology graphic novel, 152 pages, 2018, ISBN 1-5343-1150-5)
  - Heretic (with Charlie Adlard, graphic novel, 128 pages, 2024, ISBN 1-5343-4046-7)

Preceded by Mark Millar	The Authority writer 2003–2004	Succeeded by Ed Brubaker
Preceded by Joe Casey	Wildcats writer 2005–2006	Succeeded by Grant Morrison
