= Tales of the Night Watchman =

Comic book series by Dave Kelly and Lara Antal

Publication information
- Publisher: So What? Press; Park Slope Reader; Image Comics
- Format: ongoing series
- Genre: superhero horror drama slice of life
- Publication date: 2011-present
- No. of issues: 15

Creative team
- Created by: Dave Kelly & Lara Antal
- Written by: Dave Kelly; Lara Antal; Alyssa Varner; Dean Haspiel; Katrina Lord
- Artist(s): Lara Antal; Lee Knox Ostertag; Amanda Scurti; J. Vigants; Victoria Lau; Brett Hobson; Robin Ha; Simon Fraser; Dean Haspiel; George Folz; Allison Conway; Brett R. Scott; Rachel Borenstein; Tim Hamilton; Deena So'Oteh
- Letterer: DC Hopkins
- Colorist(s): Clare DeZutti; Gary Caldwell; Sonia Liao; Vicky Leta; Tom Napolitano
- Editor(s): Rachel Pinnelas; April Snellings

Tales of the Night Watchman is an ongoing horror comic book series created by Dave Kelly and Lara Antal. It appears in comic book form published by So What? Press, as a serialized newspaper strip in the Park Slope Reader, and in various titles published by Image Comics. It revolves around a trio of slapdash coffee shop employees who get caught up in a never-ending onslaught of supernatural occurrences around New York City. It began in 2011.

The series features the work of several artists, including ' Simon Fraser and Dean Haspiel and has received six Ringo Award nominations to date: Two for Best Single Issue or Story ("The Steam Banshee" [2020] and "Under the Surface" [2022]); Best Cover Artist - Simon Fraser (2018); Best Inker - Brett Hobson (2021); and two for Best Letterer - DC Hopkins (2021 and 2022); as well as a win by association for Best Anthology (2018) for Mine!, in which a short story from the series appeared.

The three main characters, Nora, her roommate Charlie (who is also the Night Watchman), and the tent-dwelling vagrant, Serena, work at Think Coffee's Union Square location in New York City and live in the Brooklyn neighborhood of Williamsburg, both of which are prominent fixtures.

== Publication history ==
=== The "Gothic Logo" Era (2011–2019) ===
The so-called "gothic logo" era is made up of eight numbered issues and four one-shots which include several storylines. It follows the life of Nora Cashin, professional barista and amateur writer, and her roommate, Charlie Maxwell, who happens to be possessed, in the nicest way possible, by a spectral detective who calls himself the Night Watchman. Their co-worker, Serena Filby, is a casual grifter who lives in a tent on a Brooklyn rooftop. In the first issue, she gets caught stealing a man's wallet by the Night Watchman. As a form of punishment, he forces her to get a job at the coffee shop. Serena's trouble-making tendencies are the impetus for many of the stories.

The Long Fall

The first story arc of the main series was called "The Long Fall" and ran in Issues One-Six. It was written by Dave Kelly and illustrated by Lara Antal unless otherwise noted. It centers around the redevelopment of the Williamsburg waterfront by a corrupt city councilman named Dan Deane. His plan was to build a high rise apartment building, banked on a scheme to offer low-rent housing to area residents. He came into possession of something called "the fragment", thanks to an arcane witch named Mama Shadow, which promised to give him greater political advantage. However, it also unleashed a far greater evil into the world that tied directly to the Night Watchman's past. Things come to a head the night a hurricane made landfall on the city (called Hurricane Idra in the story, it was inspired by Kelly & Antal's experiences during Hurricane Irene and Hurricane Sandy).

Staycation

"Staycation" is an eight-page prologue one-shot that involves Nora and her friend Trish taking a trip to the beach. Over s'mores and an open fire, Trish reveals that she brought some ecstasy for them to take. Nora is upset that she brought an illegal substance with them in the car and chides Trish. This fractures their relationship and keeps Trish from telling Nora about her affair with Dan Deane, which ultimately gets her killed.

The Dwellers of Big Bogie

Issues Four and Five featured a backup story entitled "The Dwellers of Big Bogie." One night, Serena is coming home from the grocery store and is mugged by a subway-dwelling girl. She tells Nora about this who, shortly thereafter, encounters the same girl. Chasing her into the tunnels below Brooklyn, she is captured by the dwellers, an underground race of mutated youths, and prepped for sacrifice to their ruler, Big Bogie. However, Nora is not one to go down easily and defeats the giant creature with the help of renegades within the group. Both parts were illustrated by Amanda Scurti.

The Poison Garden & Coda

Issues Five and Six featured backup stories drawn by Victoria Lau: "The Poison Garden" and "Coda." "The Poison Garden" is a slice of life story that shows the tragic events leading up to Jenny and Trish's deaths at the hands of Jack the Gripper, the killer in "The Long Fall". "Coda" is more supernatural in nature, concerning Nora's trauma from Trish's death. She sees Trish in several visions, which may have been the result of exposure to a mysterious chemical in "The Dwellers of Big Bogie," but allows her to find some form of closure when Charlie and she discover an abandoned nightclub that Trish frequented with Dan Deane. "Coda" was lettered by DC Hopkins.

=== The Monster Movie Trilogy and Sequels (2013–2019) ===
There were three one-shots published during the "Gothic Logo" era that tell stories outside of "The Long Fall" story arc. They take place in various parts of the city and are also homages to some of Dave Kelly's favorite golden age horror films. They all take place between Issues Two and Three of the main series with the exception of the two sequels, which were numbered in sequence with the main series.

The Mad Mind of Anton Sebaum

After Nora discovers that counterfeit twenty-dollar bills are passing through the coffee shop's register, she makes Charlie and Serena check every single one used in transactions. Serena finds one and confronts the customer trying to spend it, who flees. She chases after him and is captured by the minions of a decades-old counterfeiting operation in Chinatown. The Night Watchman infiltrates their warehouse in an effort to have save her but not before he confronts their leader, Anton Sebaum. This issue was illustrated by Jude Vigants (credited as "J. Vigants").

It Came from the Gowanus Canal & It Came from the Gowanus Canal...Again!

Serena fills up the coffee shop's office computer with articles about urban legends around the city. In particular, the Gowanus Golem, a toxic sludge monster that takes revenge on those who have slighted it. The creature has resurfaced after an extended dormancy and is quite real, especially to the Night Watchman. The story is set in Brooklyn's infamous Gowanus Canal, a real-life EPA superfund site. It was illustrated by Lee Knox Ostertag.

In 2017, the Gowanus Golem returned. In this follow up to one of the series' most popular tales, Brooklyn's most toxic monster is after a couple of thugs responsible for the death of a young boy. There's only one problem: To stop him, the Night Watchman must protect one of the killers. This story is also a Christmas special and involves a subplot with Serena and a Christmas tree that Charlie brings into the apartment. It was illustrated by Brett Hobson, colored by Clare DeZutti, with a cover by industry veteran Tim Hamilton. It was numbered "Issue Seven" in sequence with "The Long Fall" issues.

The Night Collector & Sanctuary

After a young woman is mysteriously killed, the Night Watchman learns that a coven of vampires has taken over the bat exhibit at the Bronx Zoo, and they may have a sympathizer in the form of an odd zookeeper fascinated by bats. "The Night Collector" was illustrated by Lee Knox Ostertag.

The sequel, "Sanctuary" tells the story of what happens to the lady vampires after Silverback is killed. They flee the Bronx and take shelter in a dark sky sanctuary in Upstate New York. But all is not well. They banish Carissa for arguing that Scooter is the rightful successor to their leader, that the legacy of leadership should remain with a male Night Collector. The other vampires disagree, and it leads to a divisive showdown after their fellow clanswoman, Valeria, befriends a group of mysterious sisters who also live in the forest. It was numbered "Issue Seven" in sequence with "The Long Fall" issues and was written by Alyssa Varner, drawn by Victoria Lau, colored by Vicky Leta, with a cover by Robin Ha.

=== The "Giallo-Pulp Logo" Era (since 2019) ===
The Final Kill & The Untold Legend of Luna

In April 2019, So What? Press became an imprint of fellow Brooklyn publisher It's Alive!, until that time known mostly for its reprints of Silver Age war comics. Under this arrangement, It's Alive! began to distribute Tales of the Night Watchman through Diamond Comic Distributors from Fall 2019 onward beginning with the two-part mini-series "The Final Kill" and a one-shot crossover with Dean Haspiel's WEBTOON / Image Comics property, The Red Hook, entitled "The Untold Legend of Luna." The art team on all three issues was Brett Hobson (artist), Sonia Liao (colorist), and DC Hopkins (letterer), with covers by Tim Hamilton, Emily Pearson, Simon Fraser, and Haspiel. A notable change to these books was a revamped logo, an homage to both American pulp fiction and Italian gialli. "The Final Kill" was written by Kelly while the crossover was co-written with Haspiel. It was also announced that former Marvel Comics editor Rachel Pinnelas would join the series.

=== Park Slope Reader (since 2018) ===
The Ghost Train

A comic strip version of the series has run in local Brooklyn newspaper the Park Slope Reader since 2018. The first serial, "The Ghost Train", was about the elevated train involved in the infamous Malbone Street Wreck returning to terrorize the city on the centenary of its accident. The story debuted in the paper's Spring 2018 edition, number 64. It was written by Dave Kelly, drawn by Simon Fraser, and colored by Gary Caldwell, Fraser's frequent collaborator. The artist and colorist began work as soon as they wrapped up Mark Millar's Kingsman comic book sequel, "The Red Circle", for Image Comics.

The Steam Banshee

In the Summer of 2019, the second serial began, entitled "The Steam Banshee", about something sinister lurking in the steam heat system in a Park Slope apartment building. It was drawn by series regular Brett Hobson, colored by Clare DeZutti, lettered by DC Hopkins, and co-written by Dave Kelly & Katrina Lord, a friend of Kelly's whom he often refers to as his "bestie."

The Big Howl Over Bushwick

The third serial, "The Big Howl Over Bushwick", ran in the Spring 2020, Fall 2020, and Spring 2021 issues. As with "The Steam Banshee", it was drawn by Brett Hobson, colored by Clare DeZutti, and lettered by DC Hopkins, but written solely by Dave Kelly. Due to the COVID-19 pandemic, the newspaper did not publish a Summer 2020 issue. No comic ran in the Winter 2020-21 issue due to a scheduling conflict.

=== Other publications ===
A Comic Guide to Brewing

Published in 2012, A Comic Guide to Brewing is a non-Tales of the Night Watchman book by Lara Antal wherein Nora appears as the narrator. The book is an instruction manual on how to get a better cup of coffee either at home or at your favorite café. It was inspired by Antal's time as a barista. As of 2019, it remains So What? Press' best-selling book. It was nominated for Best Publication Design at the 2013 Stumptown Comic Arts Awards at the now-defunct Stumptowm Comics Festival in Portland, OR. It lost to Grandville (comics) by Bryan Talbot. It was also nominated for the S.P.A.C.E. Prize for Mini Comic / Short Story at the 2013 Small Press and Alternative Comics Expo in Columbus, OH.

Mine!

In 2017, Dave Kelly and Lara Antal contributed a six-page origin story for Serena to ComicMix's Mine! anthology to benefit Planned Parenthood. Other contributors to the book include Neil Gaiman and Mystery Science Theater 3000 star Frank Conniff. In 2018, Mine! received an Eisner Award nomination in the best short story category for "Ethel Byrne" by Cecil Castellucci and Scott Chantler, but lost to "A Life in Comics: The Graphic Adventures of Karen Green" by Nick Sousanis at that year's San Diego Comic-Con. However, that same year, the book was nominated for best anthology by the Ringo Awards, presented at Baltimore Comic-Con, and won, making Kelly and Antal de facto winners of the award for their contribution.

Between the Covers

In 2018, Dave Kelly and New York Times bestselling cartoonist Robin Ha contributed a four-page story to Between the Covers: A Bookstore Erotica Anthology, published by Chicago's Volumes Bookcafé as a fundraiser to keep the store open. It features a sexual encounter between Nora and an attractive male customer. It was the only comic contributed to a book that otherwise focused on erotic poetry and prose. The book was co-edited and arranged by Rebecca Makkai.

Savage Dragon

In 2021, Luna appeared alongside the Red Hook and Dragon in a three-part backup story called "Bride of Wax". Running in issues 259-261, it involved the Mannequin, the antagonist in "The Untold Legend of Luna", conscripting Red Hook to steal Dragon's blood to help him bring the woman of his dreams to life. The story was set on Valentine's Day. Nora, Charlie, and Serena make a background cameo appearance with Spencer Dales from Excellence and Mirta del Mar, a.k.a. Aquaria.

2021 Thought Bubble Festival Anthology

Kelly and Simon Fraser wrote and drew a short story for the 2020 Thought Bubble Anthology that involves Serena and Pete the Railfan from "The Ghost Train". However, due to the COVID-19 pandemic, the Thought Bubble Festival did not occur. As of now, the plan is for it to see release in 2021. It will be published by Image Comics.

== Main characters ==
=== Protagonists ===
- Nora Cashin – Nora is an aspiring writer, but her real job is managing a coffee shop. Charlie and Serena are her employees. She desires to do something bigger in the world but finds herself stymied by her day job. That said, she often accompanies the Night Watchman on his missions and has proven herself able to fight evil alone, as seen in "The Dwellers of Big Bogie".
- Charlie Maxwell/The Night Watchman – Charlie's real identity is unknown. He showed up one night in Nora's apartment and what happened thereafter is a mystery. What is known is that he was allowed to stay in her guestroom and work at the coffee shop. He is also the Night Watchman, a spectral detective from the 1940s who has been thrust into the present for reasons not yet fully understood. He has taken it upon himself to police the city's supernatural happenings. He took both his secret identity and his nom de guerre from an old movie serial he likes to watch, coincidentally titled Tales of the Night Watchman.
- Serena Filby – Serena is a mischievous street urchin who lives in a tent on a Brooklyn rooftop. She has a penchant for thievery and hucksterism but has also found herself at home working the straight life at the coffee shop. The Night Watchman keeps an eye on her, much to her chagrin. He will show up on her rooftop to hang out, usually after work, when she would rather be eating dinner or watching T.V. (via binoculars aimed at her neighbors' windows).

=== Antagonists ===
- Dan Deane/Jack the Gripper – A power-mad politician and the villain of "The Long Fall" story arc. He is given a mysterious crystal referred to only as "the fragment" by Mama Shadow. Purportedly a good luck charm that bequeaths absolute political power to its holder, it in turn drives him mad and transforms him into Jack the Gripper, a hideous monster responsible for the murders of several wayward young women in Brooklyn, including Nora's friend Trish and Trish's friend, Jenny. Merrick, a being from the Night Watchman's past, is ultimately responsible for the possession.
- Merrick – A demigod who was responsible for Night Watchman's death in his past life and plays an ominous role in his current life, appearing in dreams and otherworldly encounters.
- Mama Shadow – A Chilean witch who plays a key role in manipulating Dan Deane and bringing Merrick back the night of Hurricane Idra. Her relationship to Merrick is clandestine.
- The Gowanus Golem – A toxic sludge monster made up of the souls of people who either died in the canal or whose bodies were disposed there.
- Anton Sebaum – A mad scientist who ran an underground counterfeiting operation in Chinatown. His headquarters is somewhere near the Queens/Nassau County border in an abandoned aquarium. While he posed as a human during his first encounter with the Night Watchman, his primary form is that of a giant brain.

== Reception ==
=== Critical response ===
The series has received favorable reviews over the years. Indie comics reviewer Rob Clough praised the series for its "sincerity and belief in [its] characters", calling it "solid and well-told comics." Alex Widen at Bam! Smack! Pow! called it a "simple, yet effective, modern day pulp tale", noting: "It mixes mystery, horror, and comedy in a totally unique way. It's a series that wears its Brooklyn pride on its sleeve, and there is an inherent genuineness to the trio of characters and their exploits."

It has also been lauded for its social themes. Jorge Solis of Villain Media noted, "[The series] captures New York with such diversity...[Kelly's] social commentary strikes as the Night Watchman protects the helpless middle class and the unwanted underdogs." Jenna Hale at GeeksOUT pointed out, "The problems the characters face, aside from the supernatural, are the same ones most people face in their daily lives—responsibility, loneliness, low income, unfulfilled goals, and the growing disconnect from friends and family as our busy lives consume us." Andrea Ayres at Comics Beat noted that the series was "about being human and overcoming horrors and hardships, be they personal or paranormal" and that "the small moments shared between the characters are where the series really shines."

The series has also been featured in Rue Morgue (magazine) and the book Blood in Four Colours: A Graphic History of Horror Comics by Pedro Cabezuelo.

=== Accolades ===
==== 2022 Ringo Awards ====
Best Single Issue or Story - "Under the Surface" (nominated)
Best Letterer - DC Hopkins (nominated)

==== 2021 Ringo Awards ====
Best Inker - Brett Hobson (nominated)
Best Letterer - DC Hopkins (nominated)

==== 2020 Ringo Awards ====
Best Single Issue or Story - "The Steam Banshee" (nominated)

==== 2018 Ringo Awards ====
Simon Faser - Best Cover Artist (nominated)
Mine! - Best Anthology (winner)
