= Zombo (character) =

- The cover of Zombo: Can I Eat You, Please? (2010, Rebellion, ISBN 9781907519253). Art by Henry Flint.

Publication information
- Publisher: Rebellion Developments
- First appearance: 2000 AD #1632 (April 2009)
- Created by: Henry Flint (artist); Al Ewing (writer)

In-story information
- Species: Human-zombie hybrid

Zombo is a fictional human-zombie hybrid featuring in the British science fiction comics anthology 2000 AD. The character was created by Henry Flint and Al Ewing and first appeared in 2009.

== Creation and concept ==
Zombo is a half-human, half-zombie biological weapon. He is created to withstand the terrain on hostile, sentient alien death planets. He is also created as a countermeasure to an unmanageable man-made weapon called the death shadow that had previously been deployed to gain control of the death planet Chronos.

The artist Henry Flint conceived of the character. He has cited the influence of zombie films from the 1970s on the character and Aguirre, the Wrath of God on the first, jungle-set story. Al Ewing was chosen by 2000 AD’s editor Matt Smith to script the series and gives most of the creative credit to Flint, describing his own input as giving Zombo and the other characters a distinctive voice and providing the backstory of the fictional universe.

Ewing describes the series as “completely batshit insane and very violent indeed”. It is as an eccentric mix of comedy, science fiction and horror, incorporating farce and pop cultural satire. One review remarks that “Zombo is as lowbrow as it gets, and also as highbrow — any given page might involve, say, faces being ripped off alongside a gag about French philosopher Guy Debord.”

== Characterisation ==
His decomposed appearance aside, Zombo’s most pronounced zombie trait is his hunger for human flesh. In other respects, he is characterised as quite human and is especially polite. He is illustrated wearing a red codpiece like that worn by Larry Blackmon of Cameo in the music video for the single “Word Up!”. The codpiece works like a shock collar to ensure obedience. When he suffers serious physical trauma his body temporarily shuts down in emergency damage mode. After the first story he commands the death shadow as a weapon. He has the cloned brain of a stripper called Eric Rabinowicz in his buttocks to act as an emergency auxiliary brain.

== Reception ==
The collected edition Zombo: You Smell of Crime and I’m the Deodorant! was included in both Time and Wired’s lists of the best comics and graphic novels of 2013.

== Bibliography ==
- “Zombo” (in 2000 AD #1632-1639, 2009)
- “Merry Christmas Mr Zombo” (in 2000 AD #2010, 2009)
- “Zombo’s Eleven” (in 2000 AD #1675-1684, 2010)
- “Obmoz Battles the Twinklie Winkler” (in Zombo: Can I Eat You, Please?, 2010)
- “The Day Zombo Died” (in 2000 AD #1740-1749, 2011)
- “Planet Zombo” (in 2000 AD #1825-1834, 2013)
- “Planetronix: Mohawk of Menace!” (in 2000 AD Free Comic Book Day 2013 Special)
- "Secrets of Zombo's Power!" (in Zombo: You Smell of Crime and I'm the Deodorant!, 2013)
- "Z.O.M.B.O." (in 2000 AD 40th Anniversary Special, 2017)

=== Collected Editions ===
- Zombo: Can I Eat You, Please? (collects “Zombo”, “Merry Christmas Mr Zombo”, “Zombo’s Eleven” & “Obmoz Battles the Twinklie Winkler", 100 pages, 2010, Rebellion, ISBN 9781907519253)
- Zombo: You Smell of Crime and I’m the Deodorant! (collects “The Day Zombo Died”, “Planet Zombo”, “Planetronix: Mohawk of Menace!”, "Secrets of Zombo's Power!", 2013, Rebellion, ISBN 9781781080344)
