= Andy Clarke (comics) =

British comics artist

- Areas: Penciller, Inker
- Notable works: Sinister Dexter; R.E.B.E.L.S.

Andy Clarke is a British comics artist who came to prominence working at 2000 AD and became known to a wider audience with his later work at DC Comics, notably the 2009 volume of R.E.B.E.L.S. and various Batman-related publications.

== Biography ==
Andy Clarke started his career in the series Sinister Dexter in the anthology 2000 AD, becoming one of the main artists on the story between 1998 and 2004. While working there he would also work on some of the anthology's other flagship titles, like Judge Dredd and Nikolai Dante, and one-off stories like Thirteen and Snow/Tiger.

He started work for American company DC Comics in 2005 on a number of stories in titles like Aquaman and Detective Comics. In 2008 he has worked on the Two-Face issue of The Joker's Asylum written by David Hine and then, year later, became the main artist on the R.E.B.E.L.S. ongoing series with writer Tony Bedard who has said that Clarke is "the greatest artist I've worked with in a dog's age ... A lot of people are going to be floored when they see his stuff. He's so meticulous with the details and rendering. He reminds me of Brian Bolland and Kevin Maguire and Frank Quitely all rolled into one." Although the writing of the series got a mixed reception Clarke's art was praised, with Comics Bulletin review of the first issue suggesting his "pencils take the detailed future grit of Barry Kitson's Legion of Superheroes and mix it with a heavy dose of Frank Quitely's work on All-Star Superman" and the one at Comic Book Resources picking up on similar themes, saying he was "providing a kind of Barry Kitson stillness combined with a Seth Fisher-esque attention to detail."

Following an arc on Batman Confidential with Peter Milligan, he was confirmed as the next artist for Batman and Robin after Cameron Stewart.

== Bibliography ==
Interior comic work includes:

- 2000 AD (anthology, Fleetway/Rebellion):
  - Sinister Dexter (with Dan Abnett, in #1088-1089, 1099, 1126, 1189-1197, 1206-1211, Prog 2001, 1227-1228, 1231-1233, 1243-1245, 1348 and 1380-1385, 1998–2004)
    - All strips except #1243-1245, 1348 and 1380-1385 were re-released as parts of Sinister Dexter trade paperbacks by Rebellion (Volumes 3-5, 2005–2009).
    - All strips except #1126 were compiled in American format comic and released as Sinister Dexter #1-7 (IDW Publishing, 2013–2014).
  - Nikolai Dante (with Robbie Morrison, in #1113-1116 and 1139-1140, 1998–1999)
  - Pulp Sci-Fi: "Hot Rocks" (with Kek-W, in #1122, 1998)
  - Rose O'Rion (with Kek-W and Dylan Teague, in #1151-1158, 1999)
  - Judge Dredd (with John Wagner and Stephen Baskerville):
    - "War Games, Parts 4-5" (in #1156-1157, 1999)
    - "A Night with Judge Death" (in #1168, 1999)
  - Thirteen (with Mike Carey, in #1289-1299, 2002)
  - Snow/Tiger: "Pax Americana" (with Andy Diggle, in #1336-1342, 2004)
  - Tharg's Future Shocks: "The Mainstream" (with Colin Clayton and Chris Dows, in #1396-1397, 2004)
- Judge Dredd Megazine (anthology, Fleetway/Rebellion):
  - Judge Dredd:
    - "Lobsang Rampage!" (with John Wagner, in vol. 3 #61, 2000)
    - "The Metro strips by Bishop" (with David Bishop, in #229-230, 232, 234 and 243, 2005–2006)
    - "The Metro strips by The Mighty One" (with Alan Grant, in #239-240 and 241, 2005–2006)
  - Inspector Shimura (with Robbie Morrison, in #224-226 and 228-230, 2004–2005)
- Aquaman vol. 4 (DC Comics):
  - "Kiss of Death" (with Marc Guggenheim, in #30-31, 2005)
  - "All Fall Down" (inks on Leonard Kirk, written by John Arcudi, in #33-38, 2005–2006)
- Detective Comics (DC Comics):
  - "Face the Face" (inks on Leonard Kirk, written by James Robinson, in vol. 1 #817-820, 2006)
  - "The Siege of Wayne Tower" (with Stuart Moore, in vol. 1 #829-830, 2007)
  - "Triage" (with Royal McGraw, in vol. 1 #832, 2007)
  - "Side Stories" (with John Layman, co-feature, in vol. 2 #13-17 and 19-23, 2012–2013)
- Countdown to Final Crisis #34: "The Origin of Lex Luthor" (with Scott Beatty, co-feature, DC Comics, 2007)
- Joker's Asylum: Two-Face: "Two-Face, Too!" (with David Hine, one-shot, DC Comics, 2008)
- Batman Confidential #31-35: "The Bat and the Beast" (with Peter Milligan, DC Comics, 2009)
- R.E.B.E.L.S. vol. 2 #1-3, 7-8, 10 (with Tony Bedard, DC Comics, 2009–2010)
- Batman and Robin (DC Comics):
  - "Batman vs. Robin" (with Grant Morrison and Dustin Nguyen, in vol. 1 #10-12, 2010)
  - "Robin Hears a Hoo" (with Peter Tomasi and Lee Garbett, in vol. 2 #9, 2012)
- Batman vol. 2 (DC Comics):
  - "Ghost in the Machine" (with Scott Snyder, James Tynion IV and Becky Cloonan, in #12, 2012)
  - "Tomorrow" (with James Tynion IV, co-feature, in #0, 2012)
  - "Time to Monkey Shine" (with Andy Kubert, in #23.1, 2013)
  - "People in the Dark" (with Scott Snyder and James Tynion IV, co-feature, in #25, 2013)
- Batman Eternal #5, 18, 24 (with Scott Snyder, James Tynion IV, Ray Fawkes and Tim Seeley, DC Comics, 2014)
- Death of Wolverine: The Logan Legacy #6: "Mystique" (with James Tynion IV, Marvel, 2015)
- Replica #1-5 (with Paul Jenkins, Aftershock, 2015–2016)
- Relay #0-3 (of 5) (with Zac Thompson, Aftershock, 2018)
- Shock Volume 1: "Kerguelen" (script and art, anthology graphic novel, Aftershock, 2018)
- Ghosts Giant: "The Ghost Inside" (with John Layman, anthology, DC Comics, 2019)

=== Covers only ===
- 2000 AD #1328, 1347, 1362, 1393, 1426 (Rebellion, 2003–2005)
- Batgirl vol. 2 #1-6 (DC Comics, 2008–2009)
- Batman: The Dark Knight #1-3, 5 (DC Comics, 2011)
- Batman vol. 2 #11 (DC Comics, 2012)
- Catwoman vol. 4 #13 (DC Comics, 2012)
- Batman Incorporated vol. 2 #4 (DC Comics, 2012)
- Detective Comics vol. 2 Annual #2 (DC Comics, 2013)
- Talon #3 (DC Comics, 2013)
- Wolverines #3-4 (Marvel, 2015)
- Secret Wars: Age of Apocalypse #1 (Marvel, 2015)
- Jimmy's Bastards #4-9 (Aftershock, 2017–2018)
- A Walk Through Hell #1-5 (Aftershock, 2018)
- Relay #4-5 (Aftershock, 2019)
- You are Obsolete #1-5 (Aftershock, 2019–2020)
