= Shakara =

Fictional character

Character information
- First appearance: 2000 AD Prog 2002 (December 2001) (2001)
- Created by: Robbie Morrison; Henry Flint

Publication information
- Publisher: Rebellion Developments
- Schedule: Weekly
Title(s)
2000 AD Prog 2002 & #1273-1279
2000 AD #1441-1449
2000 AD Prog 2008 & #1567-1573
2000 AD #1650-1661
2000 AD Prog 2011 & #1715-1727
- Formats: Original material for the series has been published as a strip in the comics anthology(s) 2000 AD.
- Original language: English
- Genre: Science fiction
- Publication date: December 2001 – 2011
- Main character(s): Shakara

Creative team
- Writer(s): Robbie Morrison
- Artist(s): Henry Flint
- Letterer(s): Ellie De Ville; Annie Parkhouse
- Editor(s): Andy Diggle; Matt Smith

Reprints
- Collected editions
- Shakara: ISBN 1-904265-61-8
- Shakara The Avenger: ISBN 1-905437-88-9

Shakara! is a science fiction comics character appearing in the British magazine 2000 AD, starring in their own eponymous story, who was created by Robbie Morrison and Henry Flint.

== Plot ==
The story is technically set in the present day (the first episode briefly shows a contemporary Earth; it is destroyed on the first page, and the last human in the universe, a survivor from the International Space Station, is ignominiously killed on the third), but revolves around a host of bizarre aliens using very advanced technology.

In the first series little is explained about the lead figure other than it is nearly indestructible, seeking out and destroying other aliens for reasons unknown. In the second series the character is shown to be some kind of liquid being encased in the suit. By the third, it becomes clear that 'Shakara' is an instrument of vengeance created by a now-extinct race of the same name, although the being is beginning to think for itself.

== Bibliography ==
=== Comics ===
All installments are written by Robbie Morrison and drawn by Henry Flint.

- Shakara!:
  - Shakara: The Avenger (trade paperback, 160 pages, January 2009, ISBN 1-905437-88-9) collects:
    - Shakara (in 2000 AD Prog 2002 & #1273-1279, 2001–2002, hardcover, Rebellion Developments, 56 pages, 2005, ISBN 1904265618)
    - "The Assassin" (in 2000 AD #1441-1449, 2005)
    - "The Defiant" (in 2000 AD Prog 2008 & #1567-1573, 2008)
  - Shakara: The Destroyer (trade paperback, 160 pages, August 2012, ISBN 9781781080382) collects:
    - "Destroyer" (in 2000 AD #1650-1661, 2009)
    - "Avenger" (in 2000 AD #2011, 1715–1727, 2011)

=== Photostory ===
Paul Scott and Ben Clark have created 3 Shakara Photo-stories that are available online from 2000 AD's website.
