= FantaCo Enterprises =

American comic book store and publishing company

FantaCo Enterprises LLC
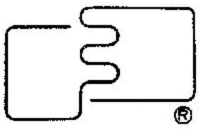
- Founded: August 28, 1978
- Founder: Thomas Skulan
- Defunct: 1998
- Country of origin: U.S.
- Headquarters location: 21 Central Avenue, Albany, New York
- Key people: Roger Green, Raoul Vezina
- Publication types: Comics, magazines
- Fiction genres: Horror, humor

FantaCo Enterprises is an American comic book store and publishing company founded and created by Thomas Skulan and based in Albany, New York. As a publisher, FantaCo was known for its idiosyncratic line-up of mostly black-and-white titles, including the humorous Hembeck Series and the horror title Gore Shriek. FantaCo also published "The Chronicles Series", which cataloged top-selling Marvel Comics titles. In its later years, FantaCo published mostly horror comics and a small number of "good girl art".

FantaCo began as a mail order company and comic book store before branching out into publishing books, magazines, and comics. From 1979 through 1990, it also hosted FantaCon, a popular Albany-area comics and horror convention. (After FantaCo closed its brick & mortar store in 1998, Skulan continued with the mail order division while taking time to re-imagine the overall business for the 21st century.)

== History ==
FantaCo Enterprises began in 1978 as a mail order company and comic book store located at 21 Central Avenue in Albany. The name was short for either "Fantasy Company" or the "Fantastic Company," depending on Skulan's mood. Many of the store's employees, including publisher/owner/editor Tom Skulan, Mitch Cohn, Roger Green, and Raoul Vezina, worked on FantaCo titles in many creative capacities.

=== Comics ===
FantaCo's first foray into publishing was Raoul Vezina's Smilin’ Ed, about a rat with the personality of a 1950s children TV host. Smilin'Ed was also the store's emblem. Vezina drew Smilin’ Ed from 1980 until his death in 1983.

The company made its mark in the early 1980s with The Hembeck Series, seven volumes of comics by Fred Hembeck. These magazine-sized black-and-white books poked loving fun at the mainstream comics industry, with Hembeck himself appearing as a cartoon interlocutor with the superheroes he interviewed. During this period, FantaCo also published The Fantaco Chronicles Series, edited by Mitch Cohn and Roger Green, which exhaustively documented popular Marvel Comics titles such as the X-Men, Fantastic Four, Daredevil, Avengers, and Spider-Man. A two-issue series was published during this period, Gates of Eden, which featured comics about the 1960s by an impressive array of talent, including John Byrne, Steve Leialoha, Michael T. Gilbert, Trina Robbins, Hembeck, Foolbert Sturgeon, P. Craig Russell, Rick Geary and Spain Rodriguez.

1986 saw the debut of the horror anthology Gore Shriek, initially edited by Skulan, and later issues by Stephen R. Bissette, who also contributed stories to each issue. Besides Skulan and Bissette, other Gore Shriek creators of note included Greg Capullo, Bruce Spaulding Fuller, Eric Stanway and Gurchain Singh. Gore Shriek Volume 1 ran for three years, and is still fondly remembered by horror fans as one of the top comics in that genre. Gore Shriek Delectus (1989) collects much of the best material from the first volume.

FantaCo revived Gore Shriek in 1990 and started a new line of horror and zombie-related titles and one-shots. This period was noteworthy for the career jump-starts it gave to young creators like Chynna Clugston (Bloodletting), Steve Niles (Night of the Living Dead: London), and Jim Whiting (King of the Dead, Kill Me Slowly, Scab, and Uptown Zombies).

From about 1995, the company's titles shifted to the good girl art of Tom Simonton's Amazon Woman comics, and titillating titles like Babes & Biomechanics, Lady Dracula, and Dead Chicks in Lace: Bloodletting Lingerie Special.

==== FantaCo/Tundra ====
From 1991 to 1994, the company co-published a number of Kevin Eastman projects with Eastman's company Tundra Press. Books under the FantaCo/Tundra imprint included Infectious, No Guts or Glory, and Zombie War. These projects petered out once Tundra folded in 1993. (Eastman and Skulan revived Zombie War in full color under the IDW Publishing imprint, with a graphic novel released in the summer of 2014.)

=== Books and magazines ===
FantaCo published books and magazines in addition to comics. Their first book being Mug Shots in 1980, a book of cartoons by John Caldwell. Later on, FantaCo published more trade books on the subjects of horror films; splatter films; exploitation films; an early guide to horror, science fiction, and fantasy films on videocassette; and even a straight-ahead horror novel, Ninth and Hell Street. John McCarty authored three books published by FantaCo, and Chas Balun wrote four.

In a similar horror vein, they put out the FantaCo Horror Yearbook and Price Guide every year from 1978 until 1996; magazines like Barbara Steele: An Angel for Satan, Demonique 4, and the Comics Enquirer; twelve issues of Dread: The Official Clive Barker Newsletter in 1992–1993; and Clive Barker and Zombie War commemorative card sets.

The book Amazon Women: The Art of Tom Simonton, edited by Tim D'Allaird, was FantaCo's final publication in the 1990s, right on the eve of their storefront closure in 1998. Mr. Skulan went into semi-retirement and FantaCo Enterprises remained dormant until 2013.

=== FantaCon ===
FantaCo owner Thomas Skulan also hosted FantaCon, a popular Albany-area horror convention and comic book convention that was preferred by many to the "over-crowded Fangoria events." FantaCons lasted from 1979 to 1990, skipping only the years 1982 and 1984–1987.

After a 23-year hiatus, Skulan launched FantaCon's revival, which took place on September 14 and 15, 2013, at the Marriott Hotel in Albany. The City of Albany, including Mayor Jerry Jennings, wholeheartedly embraced and promoted the event with two additional days of events on September 12 and 13. Mayor Jennings kicked off the event at The Palace Theatre, followed by the official 45th-anniversary showing of the original 1968 cult classic film Night of the Living Dead. Following the film, some of the original cast members (Russ Streiner, Judith O'Dea, George Kosana, Judith Ridley, John A. Russo and Kyra Schon) came on stage for an intimate Q&A session.

=== Storefront closure ===
With the mid-1990s bursting of the speculation bubble, combined with the decline in demand for comic books, in general, in conjunction with an untenable situation with a large corporate distributor, Skulan decided to close the storefront. FantaCo's mail order operations continued. In 2016 FantaCo Publishing was revived with the publication of Smilin' Ed Comics, in honor of FantaCo co-founder Raoul Vezina. The company currently publishes about one title per month.

== Comic book titles (chronologically) ==
The cover from Fred Hembeck's Bah, Hembeck (1980)

=== 1980 ===
- The Hembeck Series (1980–1983)
  - #1 Hembeck: The Best of Dateline: @!!?# (1980)—originally published by Eclipse Comics and later re-issued by FantaCo
  - #2 Hembeck 1980 (1980)
  - #3 Abbott and Costello Meet the Bride of Hembeck (1980)
  - #4 Bah, Hembeck! (1980)
  - #5 The Hembeck File (1981)
  - #6 Jimmy Olsen's Pal, Fred Hembeck (1981)
  - #7 Dial H for Hembeck (1983)
- Smilin' Ed Comics (1980–1983)

=== 1981 ===
- Alien Encounters
- FantaCo's Chronicles Series (1981–1983)
  - #1 The X-Men Chronicles (Dec. 1981)
  - #2 The Fantastic Four Chronicles (Feb. 1982)
  - #3 The Daredevil Chronicles (Apr. 1982)
  - #4 The Avengers Chronicles (June 1982)
  - #5 The Spider-Man Chronicles (Aug. 1982)
  - Chronicles Annual (1983)

=== 1982 ===
- Déjà Vu
- Gates of Eden

=== 1986 ===
- Gore Shriek vol. I (1986–1989)
- (This is) Sold Out (1986–1987)

=== 1989 ===
- Gore Shriek Delectus
- Shriek

=== 1990 ===
- Gore Shriek vol. II (1990–1991, including an Annual)

=== 1991 ===
- Night of the Living Dead (1991–1992); collected in Night of the Living Dead (1991) ISBN 978-0-938782-20-9, Night of the Living Dead/Two (1992) ISBN 978-0-938782-20-9, and Night of the Living Dead/Three (1992) ISBN 978-0-938782-22-3
- Night's Children
- Vault of Screaming Horror

=== 1992 ===
- Danger Brain
- Night's Children: Vampyr
- Scab
- Shriek Special
- Tales of Screaming Horror
- Uptown Zombies

=== 1993 ===
- Blood & Kisses (1993–1994)
- Girl Squad X
- Kill Me Slowly
- Night of the Living Dead: London
- Official Comics Enquirer Swimsuit Price Guide Annual
- Prey

=== 1994 ===
- Air Warriors
- Amazon Woman (1994–1996, including some Specials)
- Attack of the Amazon Girls
- Blood Gothic
- King of the Dead
- Night of the Living Dead (sometimes referred to as "Zombie Genesis", based on the first issue's story)
- Rabid
- Sand Demon
- Weird West

=== 1995 ===
- Amazon Tales
- Babes & Biomechanics
- Bloodletting (1995–1996)
- Heatseaker
- Lady Dracula

=== 1996 ===
- Badderdude
- Dead Chicks in Lace: Bloodletting Lingerie Special
- Permwoman

=== 1997 ===
- Amazing Colossal Amazon Woman
- Amazon Woman Beach Party
- Amazon Woman Christmas Special

=== 1998 ===
- Amazon Woman: Jungle Album trade paperback ISBN 978-0-938782-43-8
- Clash of the Amazing Colossal Women

== Fantaco/Tundra publications ==
- No Guts or Glory (1991)
- Zombie War (1992)
- Zombie War: Earth Must Be Destroyed! (1993–1994)
- Infectious (1994)

== Magazines ==
- Deep Red (1987)

== Books published ==
- Mug Shots: A Splendid Collection of Cartoons, by John Caldwell (1980)
- Splatter Movies: Breaking the Last Taboo: A Critical Survey of the Wildly Demented Sub-Genre [sic?] of the Horror Film That Is Changing the Face of Film Realism Forever, by John McCarty (1981) ISBN 978-0-938782-01-8
- Video Screams: The Official Source Book to Horror, Science Fiction, Fantasy, and Related Films on Videocassette and Disk, by John McCarty (1982) ISBN 0-938782-02-9
- The Amazing Herschell Gordon Lewis and His World of Exploitation Films, by Daniel Krogh with John McCarty (1983) ISBN 978-0-938782-03-2
- Horror Holocaust, by Chas Balun (1986) ISBN 978-0-938782-05-6
- The Gore Score, by Chas Balun (1987) ISBN 978-0-938782-06-3
- Midnight Marquee #37, edited by Gary J. Svehla (1988) ISBN 0-938782-10-X
- Herschell Gordon Lewis' Blood Feast (1988) ISBN 0-938782-07-X
- The Deep Red Horror Handbook, by Chas Balun (1989) ISBN 978-0-938782-12-4
- Ninth and Hell Street, by Chas Balun (1990) ISBN 978-0-938782-13-1
- Famous Monsters Chronicles, edited by Dennis Daniel (1992) ISBN 978-0-938782-18-6
- Connoisseur's Guide to Contemporary Horror Film: The Best of the Beasts and Blood (1993) ISBN 978-0-938782-27-8
- Freaks of the Heartland, by Steve Niles (1995) ISBN 0-938782-37-1
- Amazon Women: The Art of Tom Simonton, edited by Tim D'Allaird (1998) ISBN 0-938782-38-X
- Gorgo Attacks! edited by John Walter Szpunar (2022) ISBN 978-0-938782-68-1

== Cartoonists associated with FantaCo Enterprises ==
- Stephen R. Bissette
- Greg Capullo
- Chynna Clugston
- Bruce Spaulding Fuller
- Fred Hembeck
- Wendy Lang-Snow
- Steve Niles
- Tom Simonton
- Gurchain Singh
- Raoul Vezina
- Jim Whiting
