= Tim Lucas =

American film critic and writer

- Born: Timothy Ray Lucas; May 30, 1956 (age 70); Cincinnati, Ohio, U.S.
- Occupations: Film critic, biographer, novelist, screenwriter, blogger, publisher, editor
- Spouse: Donna Goldschmidt (m. 1974; died 2022)
- Parent(s): Marion Frank Lucas (father); Juanita Grace Wilson (mother)
- Writing career
- Notable works: Video Watchdog; Mario Bava: All the Colors of the Dark; Throat Sprockets; The Book of Renfield

Timothy Ray Lucas (born May 30, 1956) is an American film critic, biographer, novelist, screenwriter and blogger, best known for publishing and editing the video review magazine Video Watchdog.

== Biography and early career ==
Lucas, born in Cincinnati, Ohio, was the only child of Marion Frank Lucas, a typesetter and musician, and the former Juanita Grace Wilson; his father died six months prior to his birth, on November 14, 1955, of a congenital heart ailment at age 33. Tim Lucas subsequently spent most of his childhood in the homes of various relatives and caregivers, seeing his widowed mother only on weekends, when she took him to drive-in theaters. After publishing single issues of two fanzines, he became a film critic and cartoonist for Norwood High School's newspaper The Mirror. He began writing professionally in 1972 when he became a regular reviewer and correspondent for the influential fantasy film magazine Cinefantastique. He wrote for the magazine for 11 years.

Though Lucas did not graduate high school, he succeeded in placing an essay about Anthony Burgess in the Autumn 1981 issue Purdue University's literary quarterly Modern Fiction Studies. His article, The Old Shelley Game: Prometheus and Predestination in Burgess's Works, was subsequently anthologized in Modern Critical Views: Anthony Burgess (1987, ISBN 0-87754-676-2), a collection "of the best criticism available upon the novels of Anthony Burgess" in the words of its editor, Harold Bloom.

=== Video Times ===
In 1984, Lucas began reviewing Betamax and VHS releases for the Chicago-based magazine Video Times. The editors then hired him to edit and co-author a series of twelve paperback video guides published in the summer and winter of 1985 by Signet Books. Of these, he wrote the introductions to all twelve and the entirety of four: Movie Classics, Horror, Science Fiction & Fantasy and Mystery & Suspense. The books were formally credited to "The Editors of Video Times" with Lucas receiving credit only on the copyright pages.

=== "Video Watchdog" ===
In October 1985, Video Times published the first installment of a new Lucas column, "Video Watchdog", in which he investigated the changes made to various films (usually horror, cult and fantasy) when they appeared on video. With the dissolution of Video Times in 1986, the column resurfaced as a shot-on-video featurette, hosted and narrated by Lucas, in Pacific Arts Corporation's one-shot video-magazine-on-video experiment Overview, produced by Michael Nesmith. Video Watchdog was subsequently reborn in the pages of the Fangoria spin-off Gorezone, where it regularly appeared from 1988 for a few years. These early columns were later collected with other material in The Video Watchdog Book (1992, ISBN 0-9633756-0-1).

With his wife, Donna Lucas, Lucas launched Video Watchdog as a separate magazine in June 1990. Video Watchdog added full color covers with #13 (September/October 1992), increased its frequency from bimonthly to monthly with #55 (January 2000), and changed to a full interior color format with its 100th issue (October 2003). Its contributors include Kim Newman, Ramsey Campbell, David J. Schow and Douglas E. Winter.

The magazine's 20th Anniversary issue was published in June 2010. Director Quentin Tarantino praised Video Watchdog in the pages of the Italian newspaper Il Fatto Quotidiano as "l'unica rivista di cinema autorevole al mondo" ("the only reliable film magazine in the world"). In October 2016, Lucas said Video Watchdog would cease publication with its 184th issue.

=== Mario Bava: All the Colors of the Dark ===
Lucas's critical biography Mario Bava: All the Colors of the Dark (ISBN 0-9633756-1-X), a vast work thirty-two years in preparation, with an introduction by Martin Scorsese, was published in August 2007 by Video Watchdog. This 1,128-page work received words of praise from such filmmakers as Guillermo del Toro and Joe Dante. In the Italian newspaper Il Fatto Quotidiano in 2010, Quentin Tarantino called it "the best book on films ever written."

=== Videodrome ===
Lucas' Videodrome, a study of the 1983 David Cronenberg film, inaugurated the Studies in the Horror Film line from Centipede Press in September 2008. The book contains Lucas' previously unpublished production history, written in 1983, and new chapters of essay, criticism, and personal memoir.

=== Spirits of the Dead ===
Lucas' Spirits of the Dead (Histoires Extraordinaires), is a 232-page monograph about the 1968 anthology film based on three Edgar Allan Poe tales, directed by Roger Vadim, Louis Malle, and Federico Fellini. It was published in the UK by PS Publishing's imprint Electric Dreamhouse.

=== Blogs and columns ===
Beginning in October 2005, Lucas added Video WatchBlog, an essay blog that touches on film, music and literary as well as personal subjects; and, since at least 2006, "NoZone", a DVD column for the British monthly film magazine Sight and Sound. It ran for 112 issues, ending its run with the newly reformatted September 2012 issue. He also makes frequent contributions of liner notes, audio commentaries and archival materials to DVD and Blu-ray releases.

On January 1, 2012, Lucas launched the blog Pause. Rewind. Obsess., a screening diary. It ran a year and 226 columns. In 2013 Lucas debuted the column "Tales from the Attic" as a regular feature in the magazine Gorezone, beginning with issue number 28.

=== Other writing and projects ===
Other film-related books featuring his work are The Book of Lists: Horror (edited by Amy Wallace, Del Howison and Scott Bradley), Nebula Awards Showcase 2009 (edited by Ellen Datlow), If Looks Could Kill (edited by Marketa Uhlirova), The Famous Monsters Chronicles (edited by Dennis Daniel), Horror: Another 100 Best Books (edited by Stephen Jones and Kim Newman), The BFI Companion to Horror (edited by Kim Newman), The Shape of Rage: The Films of David Cronenberg (edited by Piers Handling), The Eyeball Companion (edited by Stephen Thrower), The Hong Kong Filmography by John Charles (with a foreword by Lucas), José Mojica Marins: 50 anos de carreira (edited by Eugenio Puppo) and Obsession: The Films of Jess Franco. He is also the subject of a chapter-long interview in Xerox Ferox: The Wild World of the Horror Film Fanzine by John Szpunar.

From 1988 to 1992, Lucas contributed comics stories to Stephen R. Bissette's horror anthology Taboo, including three that formed the genesis of Lucas' first novel, Throat Sprockets. Two of them, "Throat Sprockets" and "Transylvania mon amour", were illustrated by Mike Hoffman, while "The Disaster Area" was drawn by David Lloyd. Lucas' other Taboo stories were "Sweet Nothings" (illustrated by Simonida Perica-Uth) and "Blue Angel" (illustrated by Stephen Blue). In 2013, he penned an introduction to the first issue of Flesh and Blood, a horror graphic-novel serial co-written by Robert Tinnell and Todd Livingston and illustrated by Neil D. Vokes.

In 2006, Lucas became a published poet when he placed several poems in issues 13 and 14 of the Manchester, England-based journal The Ugly Tree. In 2013, his first published short story, "Banishton", appeared in the first issue of the British literary magazine The Imperial Youth Review.

== Novels ==
Lucas' 1994 novel Throat Sprockets (ISBN 0-385-31290-3), the fulfillment of an uncompleted graphic novel serialized in Taboo, is about a man whose life is altered by a chance encounter with an erotic and disturbing film of mysterious origin. It was singled out as the year's best first novel in Terri Windling and Ellen Datlow's The Year's Best Fantasy and Horror, and was chosen by novelist Tananarive Due for inclusion in Horror: Another 100 Best Books (2005, ISBN 0-7867-1577-4). In October 2006, Rue Morgue magazine included Throat Sprockets on a list of 50 essential alternative horror novels.

Lucas wrote the 2005 novel The Book of Renfield: A Gospel of Dracula (ISBN 0-7432-4354-4), a complement to Bram Stoker's Dracula that focuses on the character of Renfield and how the circumstances of his tragic past predisposed him to become the ideal pawn for the Lord of the Undead.

In 2020 Lucas announced that two previously unpublished novels, The Only Criminal and The Art World, would be published by Riverdale Avenue Books, and that the new novella The Secret Life of Love Songs would be published by PS Publishing. The latter work will include a soundtrack CD of five original song co-written by Lucas and Dorothy Moskowitz. He earlier had co-written her song "Merry Christmas Anyhow", released under the credit Dorothy Moskowitz Falarski in December 2019.

== Screenwriting/Directing ==
One of Lucas' film scripts, The Man with Kaleidoscope Eyes (co-written with Charlie Largent, with additional work by Michael Almereyda and James Robison), a comedy about the filming of Roger Corman's 1967 film The Trip, was optioned by Elizabeth Stanley Pictures, Metaluna Productions and SpectreVision, with director Joe Dante becoming involved. In October 2016, the script was the subject of a live table reading at the Vista Theater in Los Angeles, promoted as "The Best Film Never Made." The performance starred Bill Hader as Corman, Roger Corman himself as Roger Today, Ethan Embry as Jack Nicholson, and Claudia O'Doherty as Corman's longtime assistant Frances Doel.

In November 2010, Lucas made his directorial debut at The Factory Digital Filmmaking School of the Douglas Education Center, with a promotional trailer and dialogue scene for a proposed feature film adaptation of his novel Throat Sprockets, executive produced by Robert Tinnell. The self-contained three-minute short, adapted from the novel's "Transylvania mon amour" chapter, features Christopher Scott Grimaldi as Ad Man (unnamed in the novel) and Brandy Loveless as Nancy Reagan. The short premiered at the Fantasia Film Festival in Montreal, Quebec on July 18, 2011, as a lead-in to the documentary Jean Rollin - Le Reveur Égare.

In 2010, The Factory Digital Filmmaking School said director Irene Miracle would direct a short film, The Baggage Claim, based on a screenplay by Lucas.

== Audio commentaries ==
Since 2000, Lucas has recorded over 100 feature-length audio commentaries for DVD and Blu-ray releases. In addition to providing commentaries for most Mario Bava releases, he has recorded commentaries on a range of other subjects, including Georges Franju (Eyes Without a Face - BFI UK release only), Jean-Luc Godard (Alphaville - Kino Lorber release only), Roger Corman (Pit and the Pendulum - Arrow Films & Video UK release only), Jess Franco (Redemption's The Awful Dr. Orlof), Robert Fuest (Dr. Phibes Rises Again - Arrow Films & Video UK release only), Quentin Tarantino (Inglourious Basterds - Arrow Films & Video release only) and Alain Robbe-Grillet (each of the five main features in BFI's 2014 box set, and Kino Lorber's Last Year at Marienbad).

== Awards ==
Mario Bava: All the Colors of the Dark was named Best Book of 2007 by the Rondo Hatton Classic Horror Awards and won an Independent Publisher Book Award Bronze Medal in the Performing Arts category. The Academy of Science Fiction, Fantasy and Horror Films recognized Mario Bava: All the Colors of the Dark with a Special Achievement Saturn Award, and had actor John Saxon present it to Lucas and his wife Donna. In 2008, the book received the International Horror Guild Award for Non-Fiction.

Lucas book Videodrome was nominated for Best Book in the 2008 Rondo Hatton Classic Horror Awards.

Kino Lorber's home-video release of Alfred Hitchcock's movie Lifeboat, which includes commentary by Lucas and by film professor Drew Casper, won the 2018 Saturn Award for Best DVD/BD Classic Film Release.

Video Watchdog won the Rondo Hatton Classic Horror Award as Best Magazine every year from 2003 through 2007, the first five years the award was presented.

The spinoff Video WatchBlog received the Rondo Hatton Classic Horror Award for Best Website/Blog in 2007 and Best Blog in 2008.

Lucas' column "Tales from the Attic" in the magazine Gorezone was nominated for Best Column in the 2014 Rondo Awards.

Additionally, Lucas won the Rondo Hatton Classic Horror Award for Best Writer / Writer of the Year from 2007 to 2009, then again in 2012 and 2013.

In 2013, he was nominated for Best Reviewer, Best Interviewer, Best Article, and Best Blog ("Classic Movie Monsters" and "Pause. Rewind. Obsess"). Lucas won for Best Interview for his "Top 50 Best Sequels" interview with Quentin Tarantino in Video Watchdog #172. That same year, Lucas was nominated for Writer of the Year, Reviewer of the Year, and Best Commentary (The Awful Dr. Orlof) and other categories. He won Best Commentary in 2018 (Kino's The Night Stalker/Strangler).

Tim Lucas and his wife and business partner, Donna Lucas, were among the first class inducted into the Rondo Hatton Classic Horror Awards' Monster Kid Hall of Fame in May 2011, along with historian Tom Weaver, fantasy artist William Stout, poster collector and historian Ron Borst, director George A. Romero; and the late Verne Langdon, from the Don Post mask studios.

== Legacy ==
In 2005, film critic Dave Kehr said, "Tim pretty much invented video reviewing as a genre distinct from movie reviewing".
