= Lost Girls (graphic novel) =

2006 graphic novel by Alan Moore

- Cover of Lost Girls single-volume hardcover edition.

Publication information
- Publisher: Top Shelf Productions (previously Steve Bissette and Tundra)
- Format: graphic novel (partially serialised)
- Genre: Erotic fantasy
- Publication date: 1991–1992 (partial); 2006
- Main character: Alice; Dorothy Gale; Wendy Durling-Potter ("Wendy Darling")

Creative team
- Created by: Alan Moore; Melinda Gebbie
- Written by: Alan Moore
- Artist: Melinda Gebbie
- Letterer: Todd Klein

Collected editions
- Lost Girls: ISBN 1-891830-74-0

Lost Girls is a graphic novel written by Alan Moore and illustrated by Melinda Gebbie, depicting the sexually explicit adventures of three female fictional characters of the late 19th and early 20th century: Alice from Lewis Carroll's Alice's Adventures in Wonderland and Through the Looking-Glass, Dorothy Gale from L. Frank Baum's The Wonderful Wizard of Oz, and Wendy Darling from J. M. Barrie's Peter and Wendy. They meet as adults in 1913 and describe and share some of their erotic adventures with each other.

== Plot summary ==
Alice from Alice's Adventures in Wonderland and Through the Looking-Glass (now grey-haired, and called "Lady Fairchild"), Dorothy from The Wonderful Wizard of Oz (now in her 20s) and Wendy from Peter and Wendy (now in her 30s, and married to a man in his 50s named Harold Potter) are visiting the expensive mountain resort "Hotel Himmelgarten" in Austria on the eve of World War I (1913–1914). The women meet by chance and begin to exchange erotic stories from their pasts. The stories are based on the childhood fantasy worlds of the three women:

- Wendy Darling. Wendy's sexual escapades begin when she meets a homeless teenage boy named Peter and his sister Annabel in Kensington Gardens. Peter follows Wendy and her brothers home and teaches them sexual games, and the siblings begin regular meetings with Peter and his group of homeless boys in the park for sex. These encounters are watched by The Captain, a co-worker of Wendy's father, who later hires Peter as a male prostitute and brutally rapes Annabel. He attacks Wendy, who escapes by confronting him with his fear of ageing. She only sees Peter once more, hustling on the street. She marries the much older Harold Potter with whom she is sexually incompatible. The pair have a largely platonic marriage, resulting in a son, Peter, who is away at boarding school, and Wendy is able to repress her memories of sex.
- Dorothy Gale. While trapped in her house during a tornado, she begins masturbating and experiences her first orgasm at the age of fifteen. She has sexual encounters with three farm hands whom she refers to as The Straw Man, The Cowardly Lion and The Tin Man. Throughout most of her stories, she refers to her "aunt" and "uncle", whom she later admits were her step-mother and father, who discover her affairs. Her father takes her to New York City, under the pretense of seeking psychological help, but has sex with her repeatedly while they are in the city, enticing a group of little person revellers and a prostitute. Dorothy feels guilty for the pain they have caused her stepmother, and leaves to travel the world.
- Alice Fairchild. At fourteen, Alice is coerced into sex with her father's friend, which she endures by staring into a mirror and imagining she is having sex with herself. At an all-girls boarding school, Alice convinces many of her schoolmates to sleep with her, and develops a strong attraction to her P.E. teacher, who offers Alice a job as a personal assistant (and sexual plaything) when she leaves employment at the school. Alice's employer marries a Mr. Redman, but begins hosting extravagant, drug-fuelled lesbian sex parties. Alice is pimped out to an ascot-wearing woman who hosts an orgy (complete with a mousey woman who's passed out) and a pair of lesbian twins. Alice becomes addicted to opium (supplied by a hooka-smoking doctor), and watches a young girl named Lily (daughter of Mrs. Redman's friend Lady White and her wealthy husband), among many others, abused just as she was. When Lily is instructed by Mrs. Redman to secretly perform cunnilingus on Alice under the table during a dinner party, Alice exposes her employer's secrets to the guests. Mrs. Redman has Alice declared insane, and she is put into a mental hospital where she is systematically raped by the staff. Upon release, Alice resumes her very active sex life and drug use. Disowned by her family, she moves to Africa to run a family-owned diamond mine.

In addition to the three women's erotic flashbacks, the graphic novel depicts sexual encounters between the women and other guests and staff of the hotel. The erotic adventures are set against the backdrop of unsettling cultural and historic events of the period, such as the debut of Igor Stravinsky's The Rite of Spring and the assassination of Archduke Franz Ferdinand of Austria. The graphic novel ends with Alice's mirror being destroyed by German soldiers who burn down the hotel.

== Literary significance and reception ==
The release of this work received widespread coverage in the industry media. Despite the price of US$75, the book's first two print runs of 10,000 each sold out at the distributor level on the day of their release, with the US sales at the end of 2007 reaching 35,000 copies.

=== Controversy about child sexuality ===
In the US and Canada, many retailers have stated that they will not stock the book out of fear of possible obscenity prosecution, though some said they might make the book available to their customers via special order and simply not stock it.

In Canada, the Canada Border Services Agency (CBSA) initially seized a copy of the book citing obscenity, and Top Shelf ceased its import from the UK. However, after an appeal was made to the agency by the publisher, the Senior Program Advisor of the Prohibited Importations Unit of CBSA approved entry of the book stating in a letter, "these depictions are integral to the development of an intricate, imaginative and artfully rendered storyline", and, "the portrayal of sex is necessary to a wider artistic and literary purpose".

Moore states that the storm of criticism which he and Gebbie expected did not materialise, which he attributes in part to his design of Lost Girls as a "benign" form of pornography (he cites "people like Angela Carter who, in her book The Sadeian Woman ... admitted ... the possibility [of] a form of pornography that was benign, that was imaginative, was beautiful, and which didn't have the problems that she saw in a lot of other pornography" as inspirations for the work). He has also said that his own description of Lost Girls as "pornography" has "wrong-footed a lot of ... people". Moore speculates that "if we'd have come out and said, 'well, this is a work of art', they would have probably all said, 'no it's not, it's pornography', So because we're saying, 'this is pornography', they're saying, 'no it's not, it's art', and people don't realise quite what they've said."

In the UK, graphic artists and publishers feared that the book could be illegal to possess under the Coroners and Justice Act, which criminalises any sexual image depicting a "child", defined as anyone appearing under the age of 18. The book was nonetheless approved and continues to be published in the UK.

=== Disputed copyright status ===
On 23 June 2006, officials for Great Ormond Street Hospital (GOSH)—which was given the copyright to Peter Pan by J. M. Barrie in 1929—asserted that Moore would need their permission to publish the book in the UK and Europe. Moore indicated that he would not be seeking their licence, claiming that he had not expected his work to be "banned" and that the hospital only holds the rights to performances of the original play, not to the individual characters. On 11 October 2006, Top Shelf signed an agreement with GOSH that did not concede copyright infringement, but delayed publication of Lost Girls in the UK until after the copyright lapsed at the end of 2007.

== Allusions and references ==
The title of the work is a play on the name for Peter Pan's followers, the Lost Boys.

The individual sections dealing with the three titular "girls" all have distinct visual layouts and themes used for their chapters. Alice's sections feature ovals reminiscent of her looking-glass; Wendy's are shrouded in tall, dark rectangles reminiscent of the shadowy Victorian architecture of her time, and Dorothy has wide panels in imitation of the flat landscape of Kansas and prominently featured silver shoes.

Moore attempts to tailor the dialogue to each character's previous experiences and stories. Dorothy Gale, raised on a farm, speaks in a casual Midwestern American dialect. Wendy's speeches are heavy with timidity and clumsiness as a result of the repressive nature of her middle-class upbringing. Alice, having briefly been made queen (in Through the Looking-Glass, and What Alice Found There), is more authoritarian in her upper-class English speech patterns and formal manner. Lewis Carroll's nonsense-words also make illusory appearances in Alice's dialogue, including phrases such as "to jab" and "bandersnatch" as well as more overt references to her adventures in phrases like "the reflection is the real thing" and "I made pretence".

Each of the three Lost Girls volumes opens with a quotation from the three "original" authors (Lewis Carroll, J. M. Barrie, L. Frank Baum). Parts of these citations are used as titles for each book:

1. First volume: Older Children ("We are but older children, dear, who fret to find our bedtime near," Carroll.)
2. Second volume: Neverlands ("Of course, the Neverlands vary a good deal," Barrie.)
3. Third volume: The Great and Terrible ("I am Oz, the great and terrible. Who are you and why do you seek me?," Baum.)

Equally, the titles of each chapter naturally point towards the three "original" authors' books: "The Mirror", "Silver Shoes", "Missing Shadows", "A Vice from a Caterpillar", "Which Dreamed It?", "The Cowardly Lion", "You Won't Forget to Wave?", "Queens Together", "Snicker Snack", etc.

Each volume has ten chapters, each of eight pages, a format initially derived from its original serialised publication in Stephen R. Bissette's anthology Taboo. The regular chapters are interspersed with pornographic pastiches of works by artists and authors of the period, presented as chapters in Monsieur Rougeur's White Book, a collection of illustrated pornographic stories. Each chapter is in the style of different authors and artists of the period: these include presentations in the styles of Colette and Aubrey Beardsley, Guillaume Apollinaire and Alfons Mucha, Oscar Wilde and Egon Schiele, and Pierre Louÿs and Franz von Bayros.

Lost Girls shares with Thomas Mann's 1924 novel The Magic Mountain its premise of an international gathering at a mountain resort, where diverse characters discuss culture, politics, and love, before ending with the senseless destruction of the First World War.

(Although the central characters and various supporting characters are based directly on pre-existing fictional characters, Harold Potter is not a reference to Harry Potter, having been named years before J. K. Rowling's first book was published.)

== Literary themes ==
Moore describes the work as "pornography", a genre whose literary and artistic quality he and Gebbie hope to raise:

Certainly it seemed to us [Moore and Gebbie] that sex, as a genre, was woefully under-represented in literature. Every other field of human experience—even rarefied ones like detective, spaceman or cowboy—have got whole genres dedicated to them. Whereas the only genre in which sex can be discussed is a disreputable, seamy, under-the-counter genre with absolutely no standards: [the pornography industry]—which is a kind of Bollywood for hip, sleazy ugliness.

== Publication history ==
The first five chapters of Lost Girls were initially published in the Taboo anthology magazine, beginning in 1991 with Taboo #5. Kitchen Sink Press's Tundra imprint later reprinted the Taboo chapters as two separate volumes, containing all of the previously published chapters and two new ones. A ten-issue series was scheduled at one point, but Kitchen Sink soon encountered financial problems, and Moore and Gebbie instead finished it on spec before offering it to various companies. Eventually Top Shelf was selected as the publisher, and at one point the finished product was meant to be released in late 2003 or early 2004. Top Shelf later planned to debut it in the United States at the 2005 San Diego Comic-Con, but due to graphic design taking longer than anticipated, it was released at the July 2006 convention instead. In the UK the book was published on 1 January 2008, and launched by Moore and Gebbie at a book launch in London on 2 January.

The original three-volume slipcase edition of Lost Girls was replaced in summer 2009 by a single-volume edition.

- Lost Girls (by Alan Moore and Melinda Gebbie, Top Shelf, 26 August 2006 ISBN 1-891830-74-0)
- Lost Girls Single-Volume Edition by Alan Moore and Melinda Gebbie, Top Shelf, August 2009 ISBN 978-1-60309-044-5)

Over the course of the book's sixteen-year production, Moore and Gebbie entered into a romantic relationship, and in 2005 they announced their engagement to be married. "I'd recommend to anybody working on their relationship that they should try embarking on a 16-year elaborate pornography together," joked Moore. "I think they'll find it works wonders."

Moore originally planned to write in his usual style, producing a lengthy script from which Gebbie would work, but after some initial attempts they decided "to collaborate much more closely. So, she would construct the pages of artwork from my incoherent thumbnail sketches and then I would put the dialogue in afterwards."

Lost Girls was published on online magazine on The First Post in 2008.

== Interviews ==
The DVD of the documentary feature film The Mindscape of Alan Moore contains an exclusive bonus interview with Gebbie, elaborately detailing the origin of the book and the collaboration with Moore.

== See also ==
- Miyuki-chan in Wonderland
- Cheshire Crossing
