= The Book of Renfield =

2005 novel by Tim Lucas

The Book of Renfield: A Gospel of Dracula
- First edition
- Author: Tim Lucas
- Cover artist: Melissa Isriprashad
- Language: English
- Genre: Gothic horror, metafiction
- Publisher: Touchstone Books (Simon & Schuster) (original); Riverdale Avenue Books (revised)
- Publication date: June 2005 (original); April 2023 (revised)
- Publication place: United States
- Media type: Print (hardback and paperback)
- Pages: 403 pp (original); 290 pp (revised)
- ISBN: 0-7432-4354-4

The Book of Renfield: A Gospel of Dracula is a 2005 novel written by Tim Lucas. It is the first of the mashup horror-themed novels that rose to commercial prominence later in the decade. It is an unofficial prequel to Bram Stoker's Dracula. Like the original novel, Renfield is an epistolary novel written in series of written documents. It focuses mainly on Renfield, mostly remembered for his minor role in Dracula as a lunatic that ate flies, rodents and other animals, and Dr. John Seward, the administrator of an insane asylum who is trying to understand Renfield's psychosis.

== Plot summary ==
The Book of Renfield works mainly as a companion piece to Stoker's original novel. In some cases, excerpts from the actual book are used but are modified and expanded under the pretense that Dracula is nonfiction and that Seward's entries were "edited, and in some instances, rewritten by John L. Seward before he provided them for the use of Mr. Bram Stoker, at the request of Mr. and Mrs. Jonathan Harker". As such, whenever the text from Dracula is used, it is bolded to differentiate the changes.

The book starts with a man discovered outside the ruins of Carfax Abbey, feasting on a rat, whose only form of identification is a handkerchief that reads "R. M. Renfield". He is taken in to Seward's asylum, where his sessions with the doctor reveal fragments of his tragic past and how he came to be Count Dracula's pawn.
