= Alan Moore's Writing for Comics =

1985 essay and 2003 book

- Cover of the book
- Author: Alan Moore
- Illustrator: Jacen Burrows
- Cover artist: Juan Jose Ryp
- Language: English
- Genre: Non-fiction
- Publisher: Avatar Press
- Publication date: 2003
- Publication place: United States
- Media type: Paperback
- Pages: 48

Alan Moore's Writing for Comics is a 48-page paperback book published in 2003 by Avatar Press. The volume reprints a 1985 essay by Alan Moore on how to successfully write comics that originally appeared in the British magazine Fantasy Advertiser in four chapters, running from issue #92, August 1985, to issue #95, February 1986.

The book consists of the four chapters from the original essay along with a new essay written by Moore in 2003 reflecting on his earlier advice. The illustrations are by Jacen Burrows and the cover is by Juan Jose Ryp.

== Chapters ==
The first four chapters are a beginner's guide about writing, storytelling and plotting a comic book script. The final chapter, however, was written in 2003; it aims to provide a writing for comics course and advises the writer "never to get stuck in one writing style, always be open to try new things". These chapters are:

- Chapter 1 – The Basic Idea: Thinking About Comics: this focuses on the idea behind the whole work of art, and what the writer intends to express in his or her work.
- Chapter 2 – Reaching The Reader: Structure, Pacing, Story Telling: this examines what is going on in the reader's mind and gives tips on how to keep the reader focused on the comic book.
- Chapter 3 – World Building: Place and Personality: the text suggests to possible comic book writers that they examine real-life characters, people they know throughout their life, in order to create realistic fictional characters. This chapter also gives hints about how to create a detailed universe, even if it means that the writer starts by creating economic structures.
- Chapter 4 – The Details: Plot and Script: this chapter aims to demolish the misunderstanding of the importance of plot. Moore delineates plot not as a list of things happening but more like a concept of time, contributing to the other elements of the art.
- Final Part – Afterwords: this subsequent addition to the original essay sums up and is a confession of all the wrong things Alan Moore told the readers eighteen years earlier in the first four chapters about how they could become a good writer. Moore suggests that writers who have already started their career should "simply try new and hard things they didn't think they could manage" in order to become a better writer.
