= Throat Sprockets =

1994 novel by Tim Lucas

- First edition
- Author: Tim Lucas
- Language: English
- Genre: Erotic horror, transgressive fiction, satire
- Publisher: Cutting Edge (Dell)
- Publication date: 1994
- Publication place: United States
- Media type: Print (hardback and paperback)
- Pages: 232 pp
- ISBN: 0-385-31290-3
- OCLC: 29911945
- Dewey Decimal: 813/.54 20
- LC Class: PS3562.U238 T48 1994

Throat Sprockets is an erotic horror novel by Tim Lucas, published in 1994.

== Plot ==
It concerns an unnamed protagonist's obsessive quest to learn all he can about a mysterious film called Throat Sprockets. As fixation on the film consumes his personal life, he develops a sexual fetish for women's throats, an affinity which begins spreading to global and apocalyptic proportions, as the film's cult status and legend grows.

== Throat Sprockets in Taboo ==
Throat Sprockets began life as a graphic novel, written by Lucas and illustrated by Mike Hoffman. Two chapters of the comics project appeared in Stephen R. Bissette's horror anthology comic Taboo, issues #1 and #3. A third chapter, illustrated by David Lloyd was published in issue #8.

== Editions ==
- November, 1994, Bantam Doubleday Dell, paperback, ISBN 0-385-31290-3
- 1994, 4th Estate (UK), hardcover and paperback
- 1997 (as Salles Obscures, translation by Simon Lhopiteau), Pocket Collection Terreur (France), paperback,
- July, 2025 (30th Anniversary Edition), Valancourt Books, hardcover and paperback, ISBN 978-1960241276

== Recognition ==
Since its publication, Throat Sprockets has been singled out as one of the outstanding works of contemporary horror fiction by two reference books, Dark Thoughts by Stanley Wiater and Horror: Another 100 Best Books edited by Stephen Jones and Kim Newman. In October 2006, Rue Morgue magazine included Throat Sprockets on their list of 50 essential alternative horror novels. Ellen Datlow selected it as the best first horror novel of 1994, describing Throat Sprockets as "an unnerving, sophisticated, and passionate novel. . . . Suspenseful and terrifying, with some beautiful writing."
