= Taboo (comics) =

American comics anthology

- Taboo #1 (Fall 1988). Art by Stephen R. Bissette.

Publication information
- Publisher: Spiderbaby Grafix & Publications; Kitchen Sink Press
- Schedule: Irregular
- Format: Ongoing series
- Genre: Horror fiction, anthology
- Publication date: Fall 1988–1992 (Spiderbaby Grafix); June–Sept. 1995 (Kitchen Sink)
- No. of issues: 9
- Editor: Stephen R. Bissette

Taboo was a comics anthology edited by Steve Bissette that was designed to feature edgier and more adult comics than could be published through mainstream publishers. The series began as a horror anthology, but soon branched out into other genres as well. It was published by various imprints from 1988 to 1995.

Taboo most notably serialized Alan Moore and Eddie Campbell's From Hell, Moore and Melinda Gebbie's Lost Girls, and Tim Lucas, Mike Hoffman and David Lloyd's Throat Sprockets, which became the basis of Lucas' prose novel of the same name. It also featured work by Moebius, Chester Brown, Neil Gaiman, Dave Sim, Michael Zulli, Al Columbia, and Charles Vess. An early version of Charles Burns' coming-of-age body-horror graphic novel, Black Hole, features in the first issue as "Contagious".

== Publication history ==
Each issue of Taboo was at least one hundred pages long, featuring many stories per issue. Bissette's own imprint Spiderbaby Grafix & Publications published the first seven issues, as well as a "Taboo Especial" one-shot, from 1988 until 1992. Kitchen Sink Press released two additional issues in 1995.

== Awards ==
Taboo won the "Best Anthology" Eisner Award in 1993.
