= Tyrant (Spiderbaby Grafix) =

Comic book series

- Cover of the first issue

Publication information
- Publisher: Spiderbaby Grafix
- Schedule: Irregular
- Format: Ongoing series
- Publication date: September 1994 – January 1996
- No. of issues: 4

Creative team
- Created by: Steve Bissette
- Written by: Steve Bissette
- Artist: Steve Bissette
- Letterer: Steve Bissette
- Editor: Steve Bissette

Tyrant is an unfinished comic book series published by Spiderbaby Grafix about a Tyrannosaurus rex, written by Steve Bissette.

== Publication history ==
There were four issues published in the mid 90s.

A new Tyrant page appeared in Sundays and Bissette has discussed a proposal he prepared involving a Tyrant revival.

== Plot ==
The comic book series focuses on a t-rex's struggles to survive, from even before it emerges from the shell.

== Awards ==
- 1995: Nominated for "Best New Series" Eisner Award.
