= Alan Moore =

English author (born 1953)

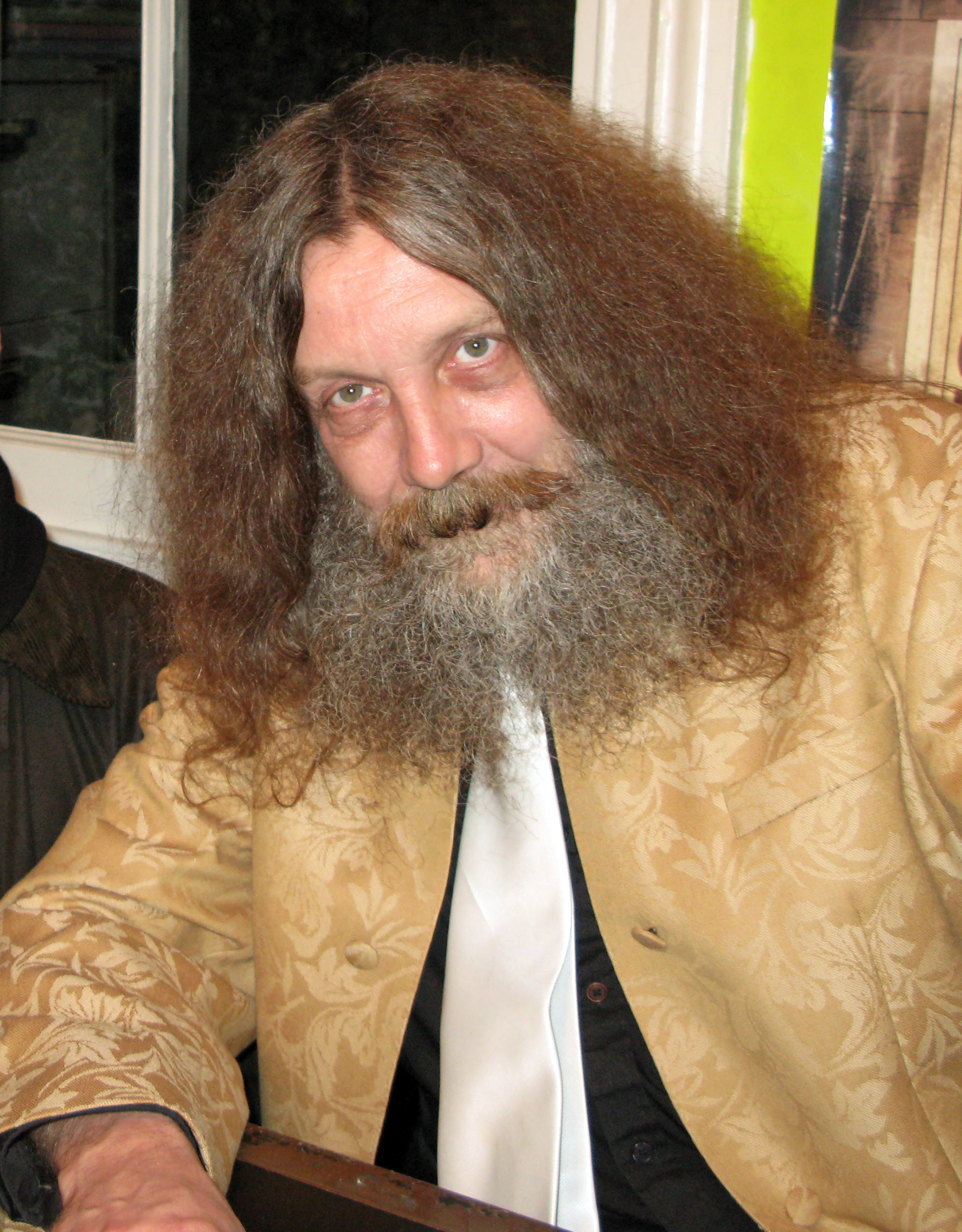
- Moore in 2008
- Born: 18 November 1953 (age 72); Northampton, England
- Occupations: Comics writer, novelist, short story writer, musician, cartoonist, magician, occultist
- Spouse(s): Phyllis (m. 1970s; div. 1990s) Melinda Gebbie (m. 2007)
- Children: Amber Moore; Leah Moore
- Writing career
- Pen name: Curt Vile; Jill de Ray; Translucia Baboon; Brilburn Logue; The Original Writer
- Genres: Science fiction, fiction, non-fiction, superhero, horror
- Notable works: Batman: The Killing Joke; From Hell; The League of Extraordinary Gentlemen; The Ballad of Halo Jones; Marvelman/Miracleman; Promethea; Swamp Thing; V for Vendetta; Watchmen; Superman: Whatever Happened to the Man of Tomorrow?; For the Man Who Has Everything

Alan Moore (born 18 November 1953) is an English author known primarily for his work in comics including Watchmen, V for Vendetta, The Ballad of Halo Jones, Swamp Thing, Batman: The Killing Joke, Superman: Whatever Happened to the Man of Tomorrow?, and From Hell. He is widely recognised among his peers and critics as one of the best comic book writers in the English language. Moore has occasionally used such pseudonyms as Curt Vile, Jill de Ray, Brilburn Logue, and Translucia Baboon; also, reprints of some of his work have been credited to The Original Writer when Moore requested that his name be removed.

Moore started writing for British underground and alternative fanzines in the late 1970s before achieving success publishing comic strips in such magazines as 2000 AD and Warrior. He was subsequently picked up by DC Comics as "the first comics writer living in Britain to do prominent work in America", where he worked on major characters such as Batman (Batman: The Killing Joke) and Superman ("Whatever Happened to the Man of Tomorrow?"), substantially developed the character Swamp Thing, and penned original titles such as Watchmen. During that decade, Moore helped to bring about greater social respectability for comics in the United States and United Kingdom. He prefers the term "comic" to "graphic novel". In the late 1980s and early 1990s he left the comic industry mainstream and went independent for a while, working on experimental work such as the epic From Hell and the prose novel Voice of the Fire. He subsequently returned to the mainstream later in the 1990s, working for Image Comics, before developing America's Best Comics, an imprint through which he published works such as The League of Extraordinary Gentlemen and the occult-based Promethea. In 2016, he published Jerusalem: a 1,266-page experimental novel set in his hometown of Northampton, UK.

Moore is an occultist, ceremonial magician, and anarchist, and has featured such themes in works including Promethea, From Hell and V for Vendetta, as well as performing avant-garde spoken-word occult "workings" with The Moon and Serpent Grand Egyptian Theatre of Marvels, some of which have been released on CD.

Despite his objections, Moore's works have provided the basis for several Hollywood films, including From Hell (2001), The League of Extraordinary Gentlemen (2003), V for Vendetta (2005) and Watchmen (2009). Moore has also been referenced in popular culture and has been recognised as an influence on a variety of literary and television figures including Neil Gaiman and Damon Lindelof. He has lived a significant portion of his life in Northampton, England, and he has said in various interviews that his stories draw heavily from his experiences living there.

== Early life ==
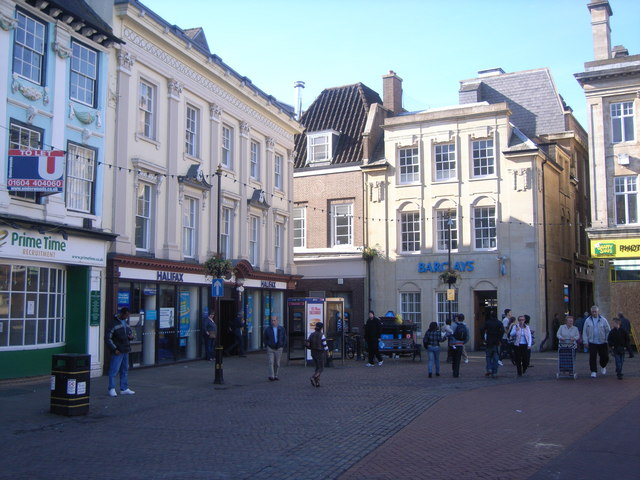
The town centre of Northampton, the town where Moore has spent his entire life and which later became the setting of his novel Jerusalem

Moore was born on 18 November 1953, at St Edmund's Hospital in Northampton to a working-class family who he believed had lived in the town for several generations. He grew up in a part of Northampton known as The Boroughs, a poverty-stricken area with a lack of facilities and high levels of illiteracy, but he nonetheless "loved it. I loved the people. I loved the community and ... I didn't know that there was anything else." He lived in a house with his parents, brewery worker Ernest Moore and printer Sylvia Doreen, with his younger brother Mike, and with his maternal grandmother. He "read omnivorously" from the age of five, getting books out of the local library, and subsequently attended Spring Lane Primary School. At the same time, he began reading comic strips, initially in British comics, such as Topper and The Beezer, but eventually also American imports such as The Flash, Detective Comics, Fantastic Four and Blackhawk. He later passed his 11-plus exam and was, therefore, eligible to go to Northampton Grammar School, where he first came into contact with people who were middle class and better educated, and he was shocked at how he went from being one of the top pupils at his primary school to one of the lowest in the class at secondary. Subsequently, disliking school and having "no interest in academic study", he believed that there was a "covert curriculum" being taught that was designed to indoctrinate children with "punctuality, obedience and the acceptance of monotony".

In the late 1960s, Moore began publishing his poetry and essays in fanzines, eventually setting up his fanzine, Embryo. Through Embryo, Moore became involved in a group known as the Northampton Arts Lab. The Arts Lab subsequently made significant contributions to the magazine. He began dealing the hallucinogenic LSD at school, being expelled for doing so in 1970—he later described himself as "one of the world's most inept LSD dealers". The headmaster of the school subsequently "got in touch with various other academic establishments that I'd applied to and told them not to accept me because I was a danger to the moral well-being of the rest of the students there, which was possibly true."

LSD was an incredible experience. Not that I'm recommending it for anybody else; but for me it kind of—it hammered home to me that reality was not a fixed thing. That the reality that we saw about us every day was one reality, and a valid one—but that there were others, different perspectives where different things have meaning that were just as valid. That had a profound effect on me.

— Alan Moore (2003)

While continuing to live in his parents' home for a few more years, he moved through various jobs, including cleaning toilets and working in a tannery. In late 1973, he met and began a relationship with Northampton-born Phyllis Dixon, with whom he moved into "a little one-room flat in the Barrack Road area in Northampton". Soon marrying, they moved into a new council estate in the town's eastern district while he worked in an office for a sub-contractor of the local gas board. Moore felt that he was not being fulfilled by this job, and so decided to try to earn a living doing something more artistic.

== Career ==
=== Early career, as writer and artist: 1978–1983 ===
Abandoning his office job, he decided to instead take up both writing and illustrating his own comics. He had already produced a couple of strips for several alternative fanzines and magazines, such as Anon E. Mouse for the local paper Anon, and St. Pancras Panda, a parody of Paddington Bear, for the Oxford-based Back Street Bugle. His first paid work was for a few drawings that were printed in NME. In late 1979/early 1980, he and his friend, comic-book writer Steve Moore (whom he had known since he was fourteen) co-created the violent cyborg character Axel Pressbutton for some comics in Dark Star, a British music magazine. (Steve Moore wrote the strip under the name "Pedro Henry", while Alan Moore drew them using the pseudonym of Curt Vile, a pun on the name of composer Kurt Weill.)

Not long afterward, Alan Moore succeeded in getting an underground comix-type series about a private detective known as Roscoe Moscow (who is investigating the "death of Rock N' Roll") published (under the Curt Vile name) in the weekly music magazine Sounds, earning £35 a week. Alongside this, he and Phyllis, with their newborn daughter Leah, began claiming unemployment benefit to supplement this income. After the conclusion of Roscoe Moscow, Moore started a new strip for Sounds—the serialised comic "The Stars My Degradation" (a reference to Alfred Bester's The Stars My Destination), featuring Axel Pressbutton. Moore wrote most of the episodes of "The Stars My Degradation" and drew all of them, which appeared in Sounds from 12 July 1980, to 19 March 1983.

Beginning in 1979 Moore created a new comic strip known as Maxwell the Magic Cat in the Northants Post (based in Moore's hometown), under the pseudonym of Jill de Ray (a pun on the Medieval child murderer Gilles de Rais, something he found to be a "sardonic joke"). Earning a further £10 a week from this, he decided to sign off of social security and to continue writing and drawing Maxwell the Magic Cat until 1986. Moore has stated that he would have been happy to continue Maxwell's adventures almost indefinitely but ended the strip after the newspaper ran a negative editorial on the place of homosexuals in the community. Meanwhile, Moore decided to focus more fully on writing comics rather than both writing and drawing them, stating that "After I'd been doing [it] for a couple of years, I realised that I would never be able to draw well enough and/or quickly enough to actually make any kind of decent living as an artist."

To learn more about how to write a successful comic-book script, he asked for advice from his friend Steve Moore. Interested in writing for 2000 AD, one of Britain's most prominent comic magazines, Alan Moore then submitted a script for their long-running and successful series Judge Dredd. While having no need for another writer on Judge Dredd, which was already being written by John Wagner, fellow writer Alan Grant saw promise in Moore's work—later remarking that "this guy's a really fucking good writer"—and instead asked him to write some short stories for the publication's Future Shocks series. While the first few were rejected, Grant advised Moore on improvements, and eventually accepted the first of many. Meanwhile, Moore had also begun writing minor stories for Doctor Who Weekly and later commented that "I really, really wanted a regular strip. I didn't want to do short stories ... But that wasn't what was being offered. I was being offered short four or five-page stories where everything had to be done in those five pages. And, looking back, it was the best possible education that I could have had in how to construct a story."

=== Marvel UK, 2000 AD and Warrior: 1980–1986 ===
From 1980 until 1986, Moore maintained his status as a freelance writer and was offered a spate of work by a variety of comic book companies in Britain, mainly Marvel UK, and the publishers of 2000 AD and Warrior. He later remarked that "I remember that what was generally happening was that everybody wanted to give me work, for fear that I would just be given other work by their rivals. So everybody was offering me things." It was an era when comic books were increasing in popularity in Britain, and according to Lance Parkin, "the British comics scene was cohering as never before, and it was clear that the audience was sticking with the title as they grew up. Comics were no longer just for very small boys: teenagers—even A-level and university students—were reading them now."

During this period, 2000 AD accepted and published over fifty of Moore's one-off stories for their Future Shocks and Time Twisters science fiction series. The editors at the magazine were impressed by Moore's work and decided to offer him a more permanent strip, starting with a story that they wanted to be vaguely based upon the hit film E.T. the Extra-Terrestrial. The result, Skizz, which was illustrated by Jim Baikie, told the story of the titular alien who crashes to Earth and is cared for by a teenager named Roxy, and Moore later noted that in his opinion, this work "owes far too much to Alan Bleasdale." Another series he produced for 2000 AD was D.R. and Quinch, which was illustrated by Alan Davis. The story, which Moore described as "continuing the tradition of Dennis the Menace, but giving him a thermonuclear capacity", revolved around two delinquent aliens, and was a science-fiction take on National Lampoon's characters O.C. and Stiggs. The work widely considered to be the highlight of his 2000 AD career, and that which he described as "the one that worked best for me", was The Ballad of Halo Jones. Co-created with artist Ian Gibson, the series was about a young woman in the 50th century. The series was discontinued after three books due to a dispute between Moore and Fleetway, the magazine's publishers, over the intellectual property rights of the characters Moore and Gibson had co-created.

Another comic company to employ Moore was Marvel UK, who had formerly purchased a few of his one-off stories for Doctor Who Weekly and Star Wars Weekly. Aiming to get an older audience than 2000 AD, their main rival, they employed Moore to write for the regular strip Captain Britain, "halfway through a storyline that he's neither inaugurated nor completely understood." He replaced the former writer Dave Thorpe but maintained the original artist, Alan Davis, whom Moore described as "an artist whose love for the medium and whose sheer exultation upon finding himself gainfully employed within it shine from every line, every new costume design, each nuance of expression."

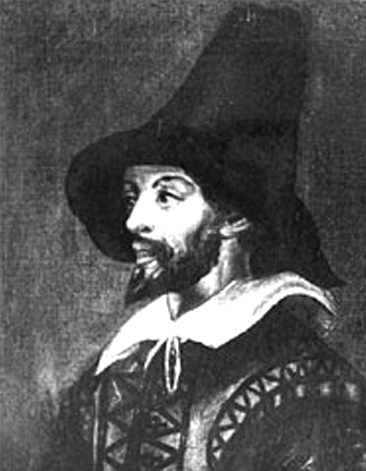
Guy Fawkes serves as physical and philosophical inspiration for the titular protagonist of V for Vendetta.

The third comic company that Moore worked for in this period was Quality Communications, publishers of a new monthly magazine called Warrior. The magazine was founded by Dez Skinn, a former editor of both IPC (publishers of 2000 AD) and Marvel UK, and was designed to offer writers a greater degree of freedom over their artistic creations than was allowed by pre-existing companies. It was at Warrior that Moore "would start to reach his potential". Moore was given two ongoing strips in Warrior: Marvelman and V for Vendetta, both of which debuted in Warrior's first issue in March 1982. V for Vendetta was a dystopian thriller set in a future 1997 where a fascist government controlled Britain, opposed only by a lone anarchist dressed in a Guy Fawkes costume who turns to terrorism to topple the government. Illustrated by David Lloyd, Moore was influenced by his pessimistic feelings about the Thatcherite Conservative government, which he projected forward as a fascist state in which all ethnic and sexual minorities had been eliminated. It has been regarded as "among Moore's best work" and has maintained a cult following throughout subsequent decades.

Marvelman (later retitled Miracleman for legal reasons) was a series that originally had been published in Britain from 1954 through to 1963, based largely upon the American comic Captain Marvel. Upon resurrecting Marvelman, Moore "took a kitsch children's character and placed him within the real world of 1982". The work was drawn primarily by Garry Leach and Alan Davis. The third series that Moore produced for Warrior was The Bojeffries Saga, a comedy about a working-class English family of vampires and werewolves, drawn by Steve Parkhouse. Warrior closed before these stories were completed, but under new publishers both Miracleman and V for Vendetta were resumed by Moore, who finished both stories by 1989. Moore's biographer Lance Parkin remarked that "reading them through together throws up some interesting contrasts—in one the hero fights a fascist dictatorship based in London, in the other an Aryan superman imposes one."

Although Moore's work numbered amongst the most popular strips to appear in 2000 AD, Moore himself became increasingly concerned at the lack of creator's rights in British comics. In 1985, he talked to fanzine Arkensword, noting that he had stopped working for all British publishers bar IPC, "purely for the reason that IPC so far have avoided lying to me, cheating me or generally treating me like shit." He did join other creators in decrying the wholesale relinquishing of all rights, and in 1986 stopped writing for 2000 AD, leaving mooted future volumes of the Halo Jones story unstarted. Moore's outspoken opinions and principles, particularly on the subject of creator's rights and ownership, would see him burn bridges with a number of other publishers over the course of his career.

Meanwhile, during this same period, he—using the pseudonym of Translucia Baboon—became involved in the music scene, founding his own band, The Sinister Ducks, with David J (of goth band Bauhaus) and Alex Green, and in 1983 released a single, March of the Sinister Ducks, with sleeve art by illustrator Kevin O'Neill. In 1984, Moore and David J released a 12-inch single featuring a recording of "This Vicious Cabaret", a song featured in V for Vendetta, which was released on the Glass Records label. Moore wrote the song "Leopardman at C&A" for David J, and it was set to music by Mick Collins for the album We Have You Surrounded by Collins' group The Dirtbombs.

=== The American mainstream and DC Comics: 1983–1988 ===
Moore's work in 2000 AD brought him to the attention of DC Comics editor Len Wein, who hired him in 1983 to write The Saga of the Swamp Thing, then a formulaic and poor-selling monster comic. Moore, with artists Stephen R. Bissette, Rick Veitch and John Totleben, deconstructed and reimagined the character, writing a series of formally experimental stories that addressed environmental and social issues alongside the horror and fantasy, bolstered by research into the culture of Louisiana, where the series was set. For Swamp Thing he revived many of DC's neglected magical and supernatural characters, including the Spectre, the Demon, the Phantom Stranger, Deadman and others, and introduced John Constantine, an English working-class magician based visually on the British musician Sting; Constantine later became the protagonist of the series Hellblazer, which became Vertigo's longest-running series at 300 issues. Moore wrote Swamp Thing for almost four years, from issue No. 20 (January 1984) through to issue No. 64 (September 1987) with the exception of issues No. 59 and 62. Moore's run on Swamp Thing was successful both critically and commercially, and it inspired DC to recruit British writers such as Grant Morrison, Jamie Delano, Peter Milligan and Neil Gaiman to write comics in a similar vein, often involving radical revamps of obscure characters. These titles laid the foundation of what became the Vertigo line.

Moore began producing further stories for DC Comics, including a two-part story for Vigilante which dealt with domestic abuse. He was eventually given the chance to write a story for one of DC's best-known superheroes, Superman, entitled "For the Man Who Has Everything", which was illustrated by Dave Gibbons and published in 1985. In this story, Wonder Woman, Batman and Robin visit Superman on his birthday, only to find that he has been overcome by an alien organism and is hallucinating about his heart's desire. He followed this with another Superman story, "Whatever Happened to the Man of Tomorrow?", which was published in 1986. Illustrated by Curt Swan, it was designed as the last Superman story in the pre-Crisis on Infinite Earths DC Universe.

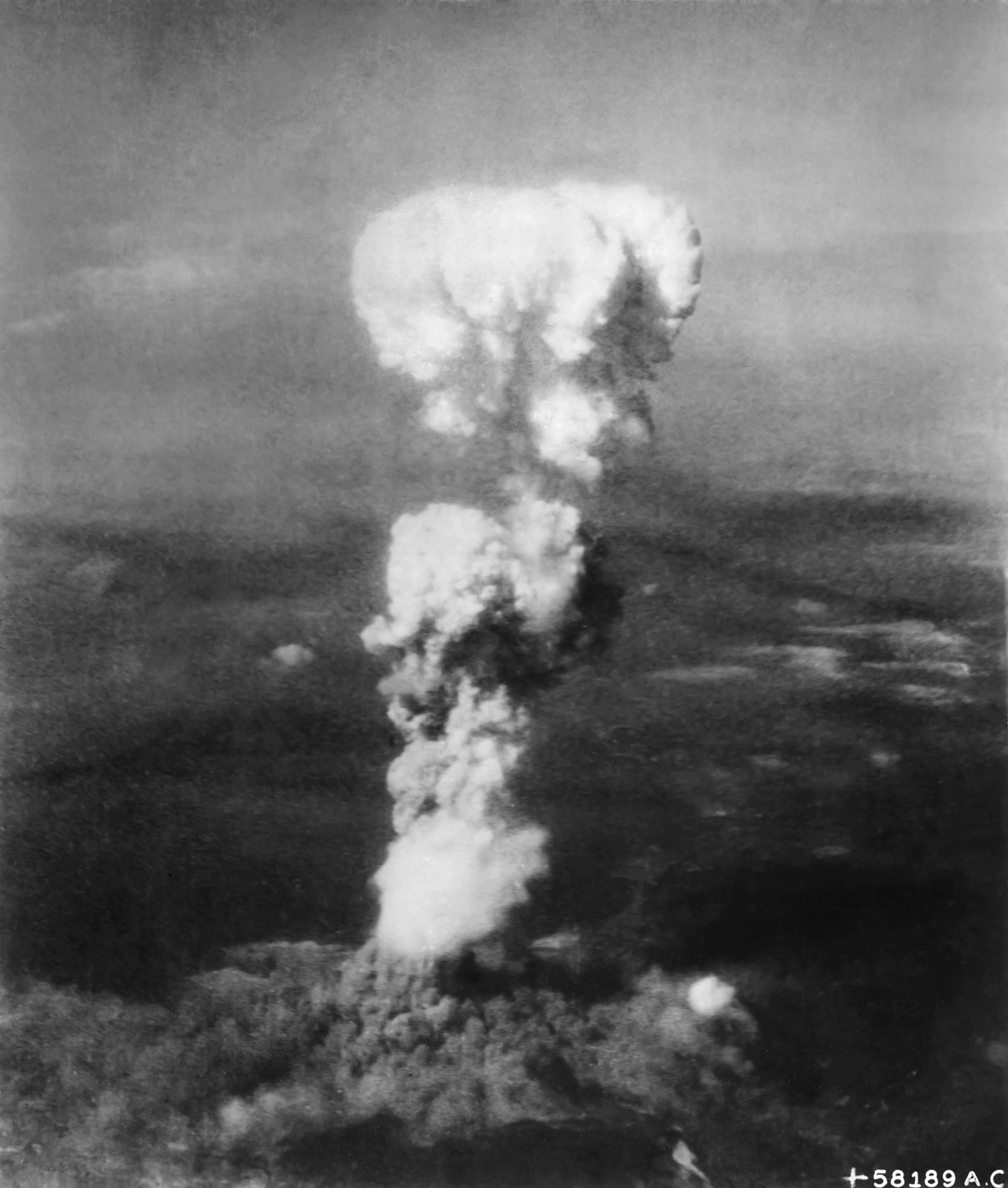
The threat of nuclear war during the Cold War influenced the setting and tone of Watchmen.

The limited series Watchmen, begun in 1986 and collected as a trade paperback in 1987, cemented Moore's reputation. Imagining what the world would be like if costumed heroes had really existed since the 1940s, Moore and artist Dave Gibbons created a Cold War mystery in which the shadow of nuclear war threatens the world. The heroes who are caught up in this escalating crisis either work for the US government or are outlawed, and are motivated to heroism by their various psychological hang-ups. Watchmen is non-linear and told from multiple points of view, and includes highly sophisticated self-references, ironies and formal experiments such as the symmetrical design of issue 5, "Fearful Symmetry", where the last page is a near mirror-image of the first, the second last of the second, and so on, and in this manner is an early example of Moore's interest in the human perception of time and its implications for free will. It was the first comic to win the Hugo Award, in a one-time category ("Best Other Form"). It is widely seen as Moore's best work, and has been regularly described as the greatest comic book ever written. Alongside roughly contemporary works such as Frank Miller's Batman: The Dark Knight Returns, Art Spiegelman's Maus, and Jaime and Gilbert Hernandez's Love and Rockets, Watchmen was part of a late 1980s trend in American comics towards more adult sensibilities. Comics historian Les Daniels noted that Watchmen "called into question the basic assumptions on which the superhero genre is formulated". DC Comics writer and executive Paul Levitz observed in 2010 that "As with The Dark Knight Returns, Watchmen set off a chain reaction of rethinking the nature of superheroes and heroism itself, and pushed the genre darker for more than a decade. The series won acclaim ... and would continue to be regarded as one of the most important literary works the field ever produced." Moore briefly became a media celebrity, and the resulting attention led to him withdrawing from fandom and no longer attending comics conventions (at one UKCAC in London he is said to have been followed into the toilet by eager autograph hunters).

He and Gibbons had earlier created the character Mogo as part of DC's Green Lantern Corps and a short story by Moore and artist Kevin O'Neill published in Green Lantern Corps Annual No. 2 (1986) was one of the inspirations for the "Blackest Night" storyline in 2009–2010.

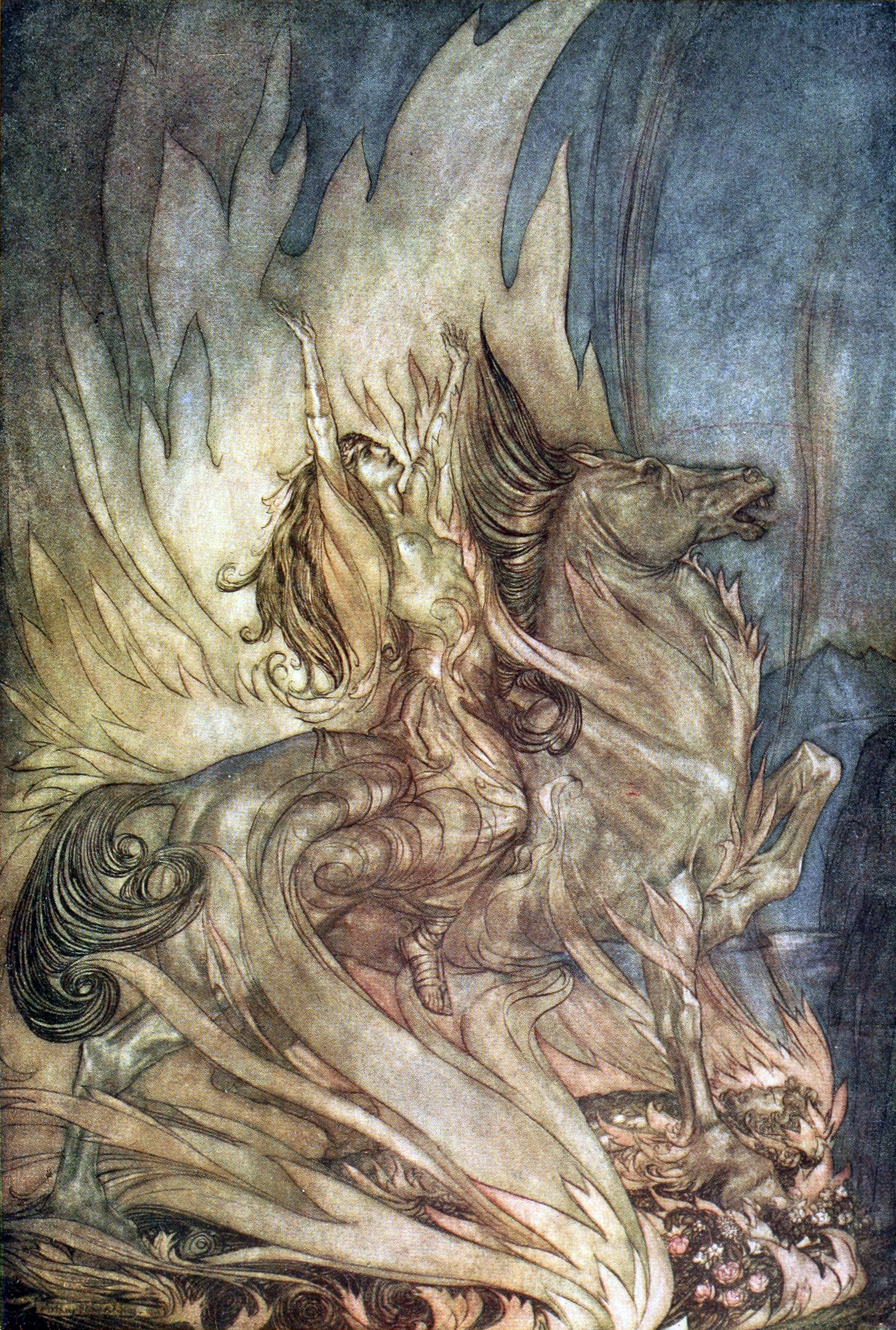
Richard Wagner's opera Götterdämmerung inspired the title and story of Moore's proposed Twilight of the Superheroes.

In 1987, Moore submitted a proposal for a miniseries called Twilight of the Superheroes, the title a twist on Richard Wagner's opera Götterdämmerung (meaning "Twilight of the Gods"). The series was set in the future of the DC Universe, where the world is ruled by superheroic dynasties, including the House of Steel (presided over by Superman and Wonder Woman) and the House of Thunder (led by the Captain Marvel family). These two houses are about to unite through a dynastic marriage, their combined power potentially threatening freedom, and several characters, including John Constantine, attempt to stop it and free humanity from the power of superheroes. The series would also have restored the DC Universe's multiple earths, which had been eliminated in the continuity-revising 1985 limited series Crisis on Infinite Earths. The series was never commissioned, but copies of Moore's detailed notes have appeared on the Internet and in print despite the efforts of DC, who consider the proposal their property. Similar elements, such as the concept of hypertime, have since appeared in DC comics. The 1996 miniseries Kingdom Come by Mark Waid and Alex Ross, was also set amid a superheroic conflict in the future of the DC Universe. Waid and Ross have stated that they had read the Twilight proposal before starting work on their series, but that any similarities are both minor and unintended. DC Comics confirmed that the full text of the story would be released in December 2020.

Moore wrote the lead story in Batman Annual No. 11 (1987) drawn by George Freeman. The following year saw the publication of The Killing Joke, written by Moore and illustrated by Brian Bolland. It revolved around The Joker, who had escaped Arkham Asylum and gone on a killing spree, and Batman's effort to stop him. Despite being a key work in helping to redefine Batman as a character, along with Frank Miller's The Dark Knight Returns and Batman: Year One, Lance Parkin believed that "the theme isn't developed enough" and "it's a rare example of a Moore story where the art is better than the writing," something Moore himself acknowledges.

Moore's relationship with DC Comics had gradually deteriorated over the issues of creator's rights and merchandising. Moore and Gibbons were not paid any royalties for a Watchmen spin-off badge set, as DC defined them as a "promotional item", and according to certain reports, he and Gibbons gained only 2% of the profits earned by DC for Watchmen. Meanwhile, a group of creators including Moore, Frank Miller, Marv Wolfman and Howard Chaykin, fell out with DC over a proposed age-rating system similar to those used for films. After completing V for Vendetta, which DC had already begun publishing, thus enabling him to finish the final few episodes, in 1989, Moore stopped working for DC.

Moore later claimed that fine print in the contracts regarding Watchmen and V for Vendetta, which stipulated that the ownership rights would revert to Moore and the artists after the stories had gone out of publication, had tricked him into believing he would eventually retain ownership, only to discover that DC had no intention of ceasing publication of the stories, effectively preventing the ownership from ever returning to Moore.

In a 2006 interview with The New York Times, Moore recalled telling DC, "I said, 'Fair enough. You have managed to successfully swindle me, and so I will never work for you again'".

=== Independent period and Mad Love: 1988–1993 ===
Abandoning DC Comics and the mainstream, Moore, with his wife Phyllis and their mutual lover Deborah Delano, set up their own comics publishing company, which they named Mad Love. The works they published in Mad Love turned away from the science fiction and superhero genres that Moore was used to writing, instead focusing on realism, ordinary people and political causes. Mad Love's first publication, AARGH, was an anthology of work by a number of writers (including Moore) that challenged the Thatcher government's recently introduced Clause 28, a law designed to prevent councils and schools "promoting homosexuality". Sales from the book went towards the Organisation of Lesbian and Gay Action, and Moore was "very pleased with" it, stating that "we hadn't prevented this bill from becoming law, but we had joined in the general uproar against it, which prevented it from ever becoming as viciously effective as its designers might have hoped." Moore followed this with a second political work, Shadowplay: The Secret Team, a comic illustrated by Bill Sienkiewicz for Eclipse Comics and commissioned by the Christic Institute, which was included as a part of the anthology Brought to Light, a description of the CIA's covert drug smuggling and arms dealing. In 1998 Brought to Light was adapted by Moore in collaboration with composer Gary Lloyd as a narrative and music work which was released on CD.

After prompting by cartoonist and self-publishing advocate Dave Sim, Moore then used Mad Love to publish his next project, Big Numbers, a proposed twelve-issue series set in "a hardly disguised version of Moore's native Northampton" known as Hampton, and deals with the effects of big business on ordinary people and with ideas of chaos theory. Illustration of the comic was begun by Bill Sienkiewicz, who left the series after only two issues in 1990, and despite plans that his assistant, Al Columbia, would replace him, it never occurred and the series remained unfinished. Following this, in 1991 the company Victor Gollancz Ltd published Moore's A Small Killing, a full-length story illustrated by Oscar Zárate, about a once idealistic advertising executive haunted by his boyhood self. According to Lance Parkin, A Small Killing is "quite possibly Moore's most underrated work". Soon after this, Mad Love itself was disbanded as Phyllis and Deborah ended their relationship with Moore, taking with them much of the money that he had earned from his work in the 1980s.

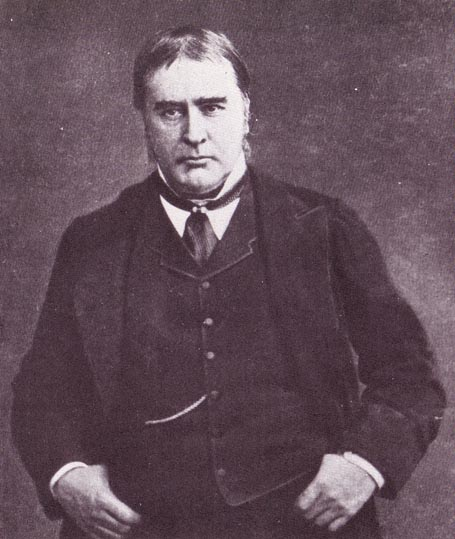
English physician Sir William Gull is presented as the culprit of the Jack the Ripper murders in Moore's From Hell.

Meanwhile, Moore began producing work for Taboo, a small independent comic anthology edited by his former collaborator Stephen R. Bissette. The first of these was From Hell, a fictionalised account of the Jack the Ripper murders of the 1880s. Inspired by Douglas Adams' novel Dirk Gently's Holistic Detective Agency, Moore reasoned that to solve a crime holistically, one would need to solve the entire society it occurred in, and depicts the murders as a consequence of the politics and economics of the time. Just about every notable figure of the period is connected with the events in some way, including "Elephant Man" Joseph Merrick, Oscar Wilde, Native American writer Black Elk, William Morris, artist Walter Sickert and Aleister Crowley, who makes a brief appearance as a young boy. Illustrated in a sooty pen-and-ink style by Eddie Campbell, From Hell took nearly ten years to complete, outlasting Taboo and going through two more publishers before being collected as a trade paperback by Eddie Campbell Comics. It was widely praised, with comics author Warren Ellis citing it as his "all-time favourite graphic novel".

The other series that Moore began for Taboo was Lost Girls, which he described as a work of intelligent "pornography". Illustrated by Melinda Gebbie, with whom Moore subsequently entered into a relationship, it was set in 1913, where Alice from Alice in Wonderland, Dorothy from The Wizard of Oz and Wendy from Peter Pan—who are each of a different age and class—all meet in a European hotel and regale each other with tales of their sexual encounters. With the work, Moore wanted to attempt something innovative in comics, and believed that creating comics pornography was a way of achieving this. He remarked that "I had a lot of different ideas as to how it might be possible to do an up-front sexual comic strip and to do it in a way that would remove a lot of what I saw were the problems with pornography in general. That it's mostly ugly, it's mostly boring, it's not inventive—it has no standards." Like From Hell, Lost Girls outlasted Taboo, and a few subsequent instalments were published erratically until the work was finished and a complete edition published in 2006.

Meanwhile, Moore set about writing a prose novel, eventually producing Voice of the Fire, which was published in 1996. Unconventional in tone, the novel was a set of short stories about linked events in his hometown of Northampton through the centuries, from the Bronze Age to the present day, which combined to tell a larger story.

=== Return to the mainstream and Image Comics: 1993–1998 ===
In 1993 Moore declared himself to be a ceremonial magician. The same year marked a move by Moore back to the mainstream comics industry and back to writing superhero comics. He did so through Image Comics, widely known at the time for its flashy artistic style, graphic violence and scantily clad large-breasted women, something that horrified many of his fans. His first work published by Image, an issue of the series Spawn, was soon followed by the creation of his own miniseries, 1963, which was "a pastiche of Jack Kirby stories drawn for Marvel in the sixties, with their rather overblown style, colourful characters and cosmic style". According to Moore, "after I'd done the 1963 stuff I'd become aware of how much the comic audience had changed while I'd been away [since 1988]. That all of a sudden it seemed that the bulk of the audience really wanted things that had almost no story, just lots of big, full-page pin-up sort of pieces of artwork. And I was genuinely interested to see if I could write a decent story for that market."

He subsequently set about writing what he saw as "better than average stories for 13-to-15-year olds", including three miniseries based upon the Spawn series: Violator, Violator/Badrock and Spawn: Blood Feud. In 1995, he was also given control of a regular monthly comic, Jim Lee's WildC.A.T.S., starting with issue No. 21, which he continued to write for fourteen issues. The series followed two groups of superheroes, one of which is on a spaceship headed back to its home planet, and one of which remains on Earth. Moore's biographer Lance Parkin was critical of the run, feeling that it was one of Moore's worst, and that "you feel Moore should be better than this. It's not special." Moore himself, who remarked that he took on the series—his only regular monthly comic series since Swamp Thing—largely because he liked Jim Lee, admitted that he was not entirely happy with the work, believing that he had catered too much to his conceptions of what the fans wanted rather than being innovative.

Next he took over Rob Liefeld's Supreme, about a character with many similarities with DC Comics' Superman. Instead of emphasising increased realism as he had done with earlier superhero comics he had taken over, Moore did the opposite and began basing the series on the Silver Age Superman comics of the 1960s, introducing a female superhero Suprema, a super-dog Radar and a Kryptonite-like material known as Supremium, in doing so harking back to the original "mythic" figure of the American superhero. Under Moore, Supreme proved a critical and commercial success, announcing that he was back in the mainstream after several years of self-imposed exile.

When Rob Liefeld, one of Image's co-founders, split from the publisher and formed his own company Awesome Entertainment, he hired Moore to create a new universe for the characters he had brought with him from Image. Moore's "solution was breathtaking and cocky—he created a long and distinguished history for these new characters, retro-fitting a fake silver and gold age for them." Moore began writing comics for many of these characters, such as Glory and Youngblood, as well as a three-part miniseries known as Judgment Day to provide a basis for the Awesome Universe. Moore was not satisfied with Liefeld, saying "I just got fed up with the unreliability of information that I get from him, that I didn't trust him. I didn't think that he was respecting the work and I found it hard to respect him. And also by then I was probably feeling that with the exception of Jim Lee, Jim Valentino—people like that—that a couple of the Image partners were seeming, to my eyes, to be less than gentlemen. They were seeming to be not necessarily the people I wanted to deal with."

=== America's Best Comics: 1999–2008 ===
Image partner Jim Lee offered to provide Moore with his own imprint, which would be under Lee's company WildStorm Productions. Moore named this imprint America's Best Comics, lining up a series of artists and writers to assist him in this venture. Lee soon sold WildStorm—including America's Best Comics—to DC Comics, and "Moore found himself back with a company he'd vowed to never work with again". Lee and editor Scott Dunbier flew to England personally to reassure Moore that he would not be affected by the sale, and would not have to deal with DC directly. Moore decided that there were too many people involved to back out from the project, and so ABC was launched in early 1999.

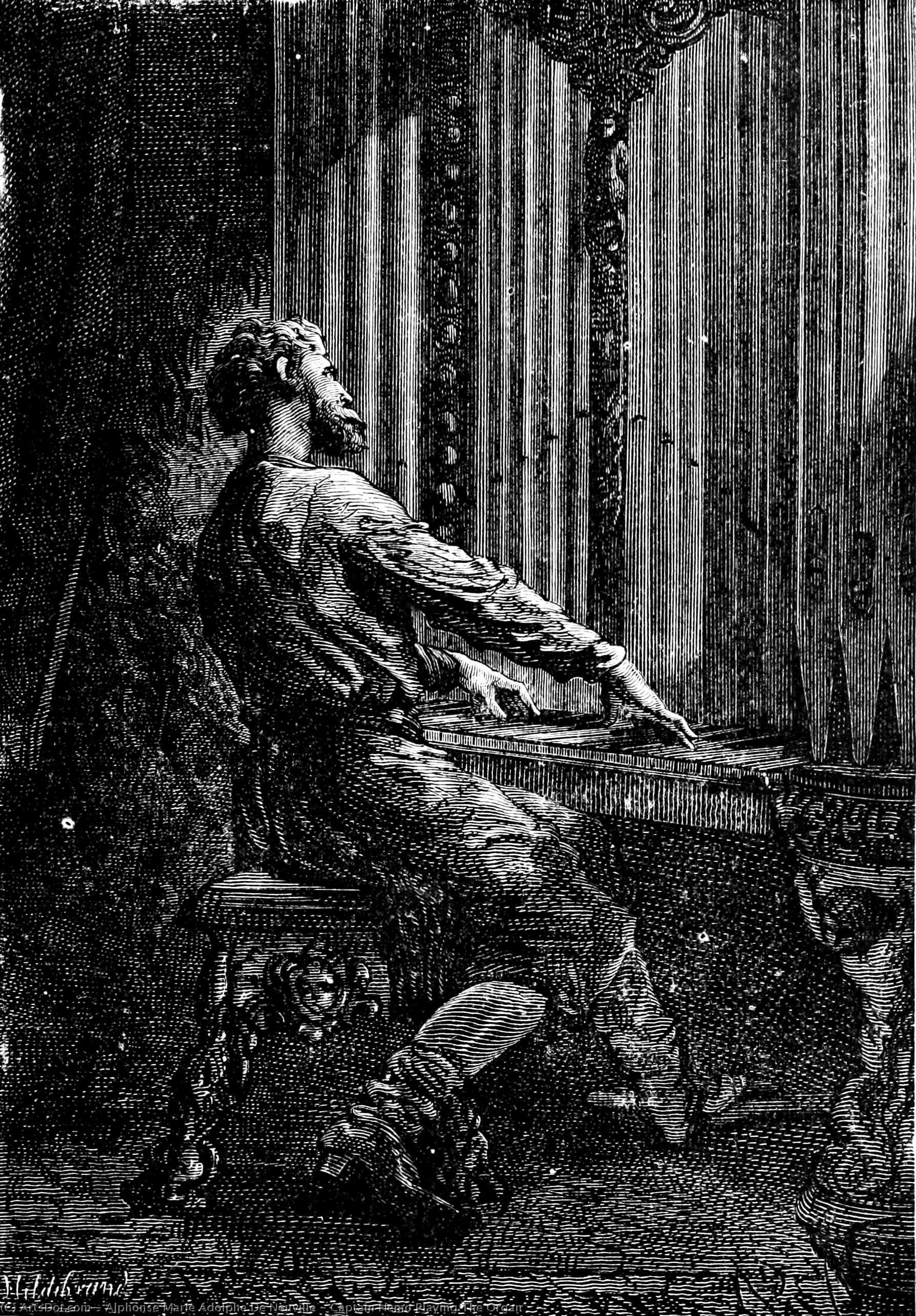
Captain Nemo is one of many Victorian literary characters featured in The League of Extraordinary Gentlemen.

The first series published by ABC was The League of Extraordinary Gentlemen, which featured a variety of characters from Victorian adventure novels, such as H. Rider Haggard's Allan Quatermain, H. G. Wells' Invisible Man, Jules Verne's Captain Nemo, Robert Louis Stevenson's Dr. Jekyll and Mr. Hyde, and Wilhelmina Murray from Bram Stoker's Dracula. Illustrated by Kevin O'Neill, the first volume of the series pitted the League against Professor Moriarty from the Sherlock Holmes books; the second, against the Martians from The War of the Worlds. A third volume entitled The Black Dossier was set in the 1950s. The series was well received, and Moore was pleased that an American audience was enjoying something he considered "perversely English", and that it was inspiring some readers to get interested in Victorian literature.

Another of Moore's ABC works was Tom Strong, a post-modern superhero series, featured a hero inspired by characters pre-dating Superman, such as Doc Savage and Tarzan. The character's drug-induced longevity allowed Moore to include flashbacks to Strong's adventures throughout the 20th century, written and drawn in period styles, as a comment on the history of comics and pulp fiction. The primary artist was Chris Sprouse. Tom Strong bore many similarities to Moore's earlier work on Supreme, but according to Lance Parkin, was "more subtle", and was "ABC's most accessible comic".

Moore's Top 10, a deadpan police procedural drama set in a city called Neopolis where everyone, including the police, criminals and civilians has super-powers, costumes and secret identities, was drawn by Gene Ha and Zander Cannon. The series ended after twelve issues but has spawned four spin-offs: a miniseries Smax, which was set in a fantasy realm and drawn by Cannon; Top 10: The Forty-Niners, a prequel to the main Top Ten series drawn by Ha; and two sequel miniseries, Top 10: Beyond the Farthest Precinct, which was written by Paul Di Filippo and drawn by Jerry Ordway, and Top 10: Season Two, written by Cannon and drawn by Ha.

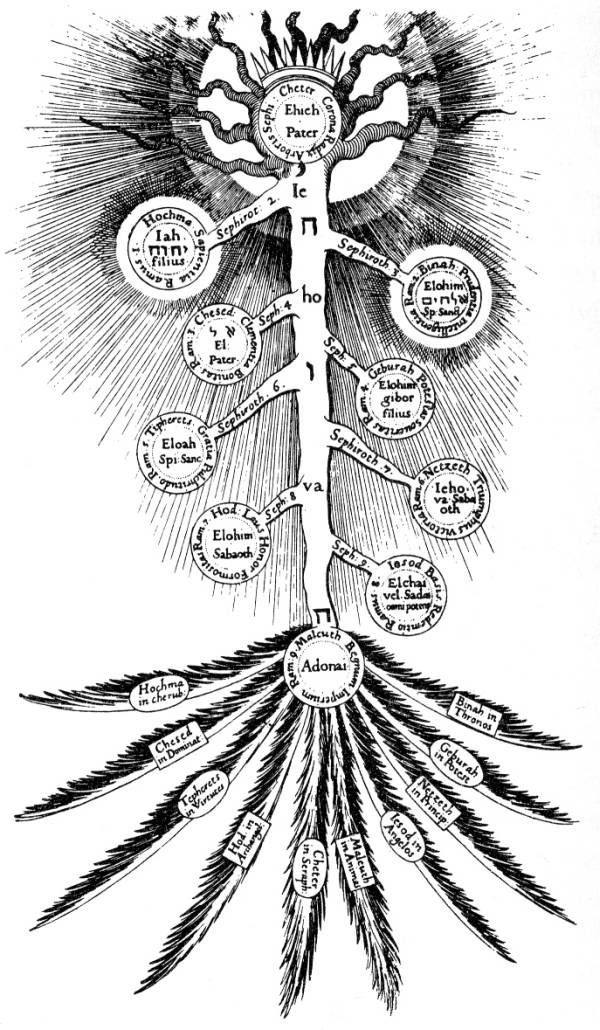
The Kabbalistic tree of life, which serves as a structural device for a chapter in Promethea

Moore's series Promethea, which told the story of a teenage girl, Sophie Bangs, who is possessed by an ancient pagan goddess, the titular Promethea, explored many occult themes, particularly the Qabalah and the concept of magic, with Moore stating that "I wanted to be able to do an occult comic that didn't portray the occult as a dark, scary place, because that's not my experience of it ... [Promethea was] more psychedelic ... more sophisticated, more experimental, more ecstatic and exuberant." Drawn by J. H. Williams III, it has been described as "a personal statement" from Moore, being one of his most personal works, and that it encompasses "a belief system, a personal cosmology".

ABC Comics was also used to publish an anthology series, Tomorrow Stories, which featured a regular cast of characters such as Cobweb, First American, Greyshirt, Jack B. Quick and Splash Brannigan. Tomorrow Stories was notable for being an anthology series, a medium that had largely died out in American comics at the time.

Despite the assurances that DC Comics would not interfere with Moore and his work, they subsequently did so, angering him. Specifically, in League of Extraordinary Gentlemen No. 5, an authentic vintage advertisement for a "Marvel"-brand douche caused DC executive Paul Levitz to order the entire print run destroyed and reprinted with the advertisement amended to "Amaze", to avoid friction with DC's competitor Marvel Comics. A Cobweb story Moore wrote for Tomorrow Stories No. 8 featuring references to L. Ron Hubbard, American occultist Jack Parsons, and the "Babalon Working", was blocked by DC Comics due to the subject matter. DC had already published a version of the same event in their Paradox Press volume The Big Book of Conspiracies.

In 2003, a documentary about him was made by Shadowsnake Films, titled The Mindscape of Alan Moore, which was later released on DVD.

=== Return to independents: 2009–present ===
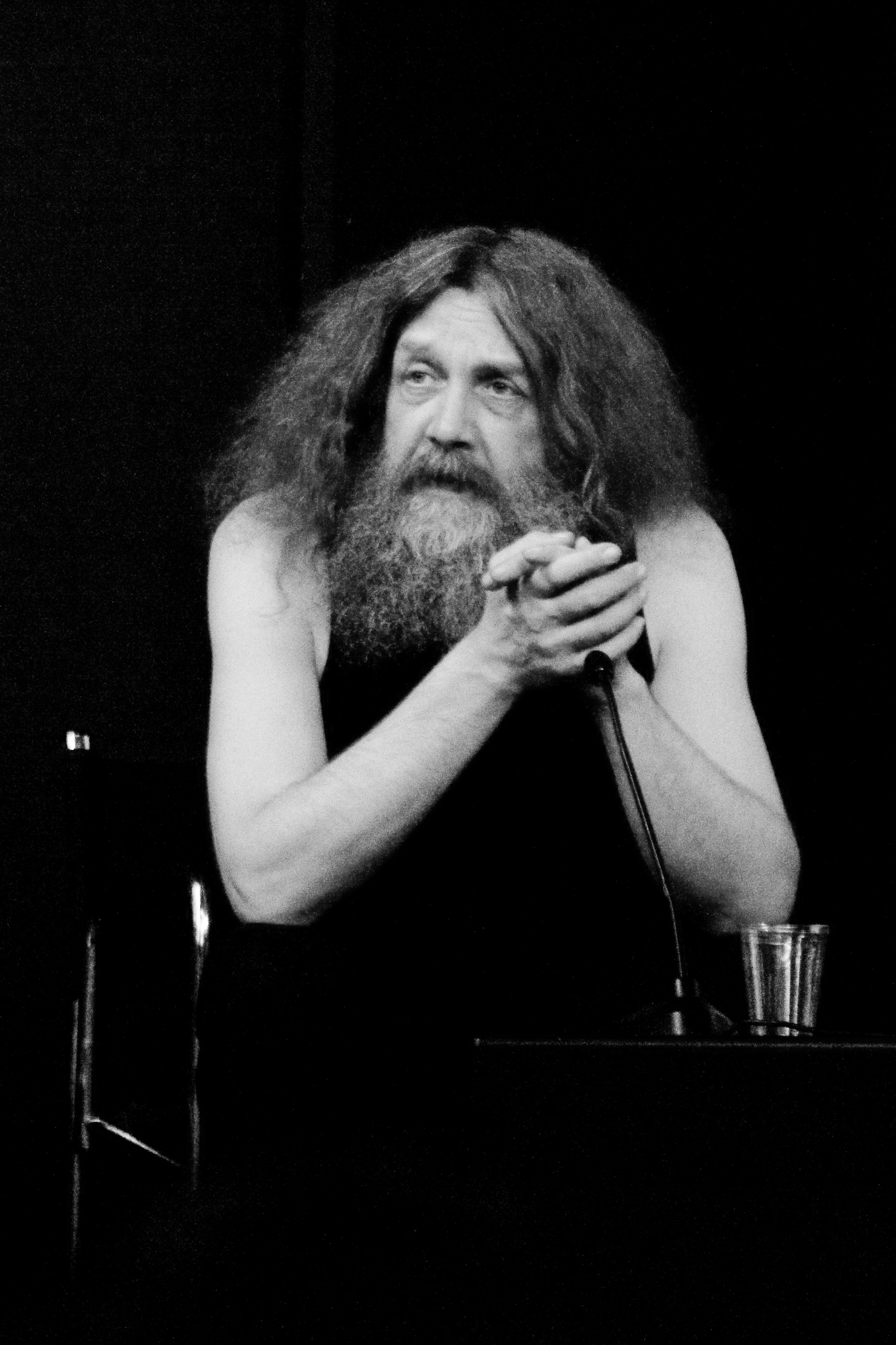
Moore at the Institute of Contemporary Arts in 2009

With many of the stories he had planned for America's Best Comics brought to an end, and with his increasing dissatisfaction with how DC Comics were interfering with his work, he decided to once more pull out of the comics mainstream. In 2005, he remarked that "I love the comics medium. I pretty much detest the comics industry. Give it another 15 months, I'll probably be pulling out of mainstream, commercial comics." The only ABC title continued by Moore was The League of Extraordinary Gentlemen; after cutting ties with DC he launched the new League saga, Volume III: Century, in a co-publishing partnership of Top Shelf Productions and Knockabout Comics, the first part, titled "1910" released in 2009, the second, titled "1969", released in 2011, and the third, titled "2009", released in 2012. He continues to work with Kevin O'Neill on their League of Extraordinary Gentlemen spin-off, Nemo, with three graphic novels published, "Heart of Ice", "The Roses of Berlin" and "River of Ghosts".

In 2006, the complete edition of Lost Girls was published, as a slipcased set of three hardcover volumes. The same year Moore published an eight-page article tracing out the history of pornography in which he argued that a society's vibrancy and success are related to its permissiveness in sexual matters. Decrying that the consumption of contemporary ubiquitous pornography was still widely considered shameful, he called for a new and more artistic pornography that could be openly discussed and would have a beneficial impact on society. He expanded on this for a 2009 book-length essay entitled 25,000 years of Erotic Freedom, which was described by a reviewer as "a tremendously witty history lecture—a sort of Horrible Histories for grownups."

In 2007, Moore appeared in animated form in an episode of The Simpsons—a show of which he is a fan—entitled "Husbands and Knives", which aired on his fifty-fourth birthday.

From 2009 to 2012, Moore was a panellist on the BBC Radio 4 programme The Infinite Monkey Cage, which is hosted by physicist Brian Cox and comedian Robin Ince.

In 2010, Moore began what he described as "the 21st century's first underground magazine". Titled Dodgem Logic, the bi-monthly publication consisted of work by a number of Northampton and Midlands-based authors and artists, as well as original contributions from Moore. Despite Dodgem Logic's content not being particularly regional or parochial, its advertising sales remained mainly Midland's based, limiting its financial stability, and making it unusually dependent upon sales revenues. It ran for eight issues and folded in April 2011.

In 2010 Moore began publishing a series of comics set in the H. P. Lovecraft universe returning to an earlier interest in the work and worlds of the author. Avatar Press had previously published Alan Moore's Yuggoth Cultures and Other Growths, a compilation of unpublished scripts and strips and comic adaptations of previously published poems by Moore themed around or based upon Lovecraft's work in 2003, followed by the two part The Courtyard adapted from a previously published Lovecraftian Moore short story. The horror miniseries Neonomicon, the first of Moore's original comic works released by Avatar Press, were illustrated by Jacen Burrows who had also illustrated the earlier adaptations, and the fourth and final issue was released in January 2011. In 2014 a twelve-part series reuniting Moore with Jacen Burrows was announced titled Providence on Lovecraft and the sources of the Cthulhu Mythos forming a prequel to Neonomicon. It was published in twelve issues from 2015 to 2017.

Moore has appeared live at music events collaborating with a number of different musicians, including a 2011 appearance with Stephen O'Malley at the All Tomorrow's Parties 'I'll Be Your Mirror' music festival in London.

A planned future project is an occult textbook known as The Moon and Serpent Bumper Book of Magic, written with Steve Moore. It will be published by Top Shelf on 15 October 2024. In September 2016, he published a novel called Jerusalem, which is also set in Northampton.

Alan Moore has joined the Occupy Comics Kickstarter project. Moore contributed an essay on comics as counter-culture.

In 2014, Moore announced that he was leading a research and development project to "create an app enabling digital comics to be made by anyone". Electricomics premiered in 2015. It is an open source app for reading and creating interactive comics. Moore wrote the story Big Nemo, a dystopian sequel to Winsor McCay's Little Nemo. It was illustrated by Colleen Doran and animated by Ocasta Studios with colours by Jose Villarubia. The Guardian chose it as one of the best iPhone/iPad apps of 2015. Pipedream Comics named it the Digital Comics App of the Year.

In 2016, Moore confirmed that after authoring a final League of Extraordinary Gentlemen book, he planned on retiring from regularly writing comic books.

In April 2016, Moore began curating a comic book anthology series entitled Cinema Purgatorio published by Avatar Press, each issue opening with a story written by Moore and illustrated by Kevin O'Neill. The book also features the writing and artist team-ups of Garth Ennis and Raulo Cáceres (Code Pru), Max Brooks and Michael DiPascale (A More Perfect Union), Kieron Gillen and Ignacio Calero (Modded), and Christos Gage and Gabriel Andrade (The Vast). The anthology series has been described as "Classic tropes of pulp fiction, either turned on their head, given new filters or explored in ridiculous detail, by some of the very best comic creators we have today."

In 2018, Moore contributed to the comic anthology 24 Panels. The publication was curated by Kieron Gillen and intended to raise funds for those affected by the Grenfell Tower fire of 2017.

With the end of the fourth volume of League of Extraordinary Gentlemen, the conclusion of his Lovecraft sequence and some short stories appearing in Cinema Purgatorio, Moore has retired from comics as of mid-2019. In 2022 he confirmed it, saying "I'm definitely done with comics, I haven't written one for getting on for five years. I will always love and adore the comics medium but the comics industry and all of the stuff attached to it just became unbearable."

In 2021, it was announced that Moore was a writing a five-volume fantasy novel series titled Long London. The first book of the series, The Great When, was released on 1 October 2024, while the second book of the series is named as I Hear A New World.

== Work ==
=== Themes ===
In a number of his comics, where he was taking over from earlier writers, including Marvelman, Swamp Thing and Supreme, he used the "familiar tactic of wiping out what had gone before, giving the hero amnesia and revealing that everything we'd learned to that point was a lie." In this manner he was largely able to start afresh with the character and its series and was not constrained by earlier canon. While commenting on the artistic restrictiveness of serialised comic books, artist Joe Rubinstein gave the example that a comics creator would be limited in what he could do with Spider-Man, and added, "unless you're Alan Moore, who would probably kill him and bring him back as a real spider or something".

As a comics writer, Moore applies literary sensibilities to the mainstream of the medium as well as including challenging subject matter and adult themes. He brings a wide range of influences to his work, such as William S. Burroughs, William Blake, Thomas Pynchon and Iain Sinclair, New Wave science fiction writers like Michael Moorcock, and horror writers such as Clive Barker. Influences within comics include Will Eisner, Steve Ditko, Harvey Kurtzman, Jack Kirby and Bryan Talbot.

=== Recognition and awards ===
Moore's work in the comic book medium has been widely recognised by his peers and by critics. Comics historian George Khoury asserted that "to call this free spirit the best writer in the history of comic books is an understatement" while interviewer Steve Rose referred to him as "the Orson Welles of comics" who is "the undisputed high priest of the medium, whose every word is seized upon like a message from the ether" by comic book fans. Douglas Wolk observed: "Moore has undisputably made it into the Hall of Fame: he's one of the pillars of English-language comics, alongside Jack Kirby and Will Eisner and Harvey Kurtzman and not many others. He's also the grand exception in that hall, since the other pillars are artists—and more often than not, writer/artists. Moore is a writer almost exclusively, though his hyper detailed scripts always play to the strengths of the artists he works with. That makes him the chief monkey wrench in comics author theory. The main reason that almost nobody's willing to say that a single cartoonist is categorically superior to a writer/artist team is that such a rule would run smack into Moore's bibliography. In fact, a handful of cartoonists who almost always write the stories they draw have made exceptions for Moore—Jaime Hernández, Mark Beyer and most memorably Eddie Campbell."

Moore was voted Best Writer by the Society of Strip Illustration in both 1982 and 1983.

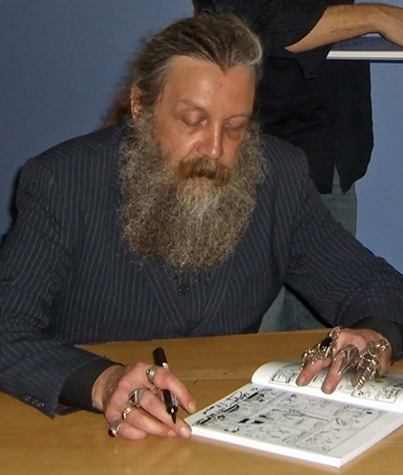
Moore signing an autograph, 2006

Moore won numerous Jack Kirby Awards, including for Best Single Issue for Swamp Thing Annual No. 2 in 1985 with John Totleben and Steve Bissette, for Best Continuing Series for Swamp Thing in 1985, 1986 and 1987 with Totleben and Bissette, Best Writer for Swamp Thing in 1985 and 1986 and for Watchmen in 1987, and with Dave Gibbons for Best Finite Series and Best Writer/Artist (Single or Team) for Watchmen in 1987.

He received an Inkpot Award at San Diego Comic-Con in 1985.

Moore has won multiple Eagle Awards, including virtually a "clean sweep" in 1986 for his work on Watchmen and Swamp Thing. Moore not only won "favourite writer in both the US and UK categories", but had his work win for favourite comic book, supporting character and new title in the US; and character, continuing story and "character worthy of own title" in the UK (in which last category his works held all top three spots).

Moore has been nominated for the Comics Buyer's Guide Fan Awards several times, winning for Favorite Writer in 1985, 1986, 1987, 1999 and 2000. He won the CBG Fan Award for Favorite Comic Book Story (Watchmen) in 1987 and Favorite Original Graphic Novel or Album (Batman: The Killing Joke with Brian Bolland) in 1988.

He was given the "Best Comics Writer Ever" National Comics Award in 2001, 2002, and 2003. In addition, he was added to the National Comics Award's Roll of Honour in 2002.

He received the Harvey Award for Best Writer for 1988 (for Watchmen), for 1995 and 1996 (for From Hell), for 1999 (for his body of work, including From Hell and Supreme), for 2000 (for The League of Extraordinary Gentlemen), and for 2001 and 2003 (for Promethea).

Among his numerous international prizes are the German Max & Moritz Prize for an exceptional oeuvre (2008) and the British National Comics Award for Best Comics Writer Ever (in 2001 and 2002). He also won French awards like the Angoulême International Comics Festival Prize for Best Album for Watchmen in 1989 and V for Vendetta in 1990, and the Prix de la critique for From Hell in 2001, the Swedish Urhunden Prize in 1992 for Watchmen and several Spanish Haxtur Awards, in 1988 for Watchmen and 1989 for Swamp Thing (both for Best Writer).

In 1988 he received a World Fantasy Award for Best Novella for A Hypothetical Lizard, which Avatar Press published in 2004 as a comics adaption by Antony Johnston. Moore also won two International Horror Guild Awards in the category Graphic Story/Illustrated Narrative (in 1995 with Eddie Campbell for From Hell and in 2003 with Kevin O'Neill for The League of Extraordinary Gentlemen). Moore received a Bram Stoker Award in the category Best Illustrated Narrative for The League of Extraordinary Gentlemen in 2000, then again in 2012 for Neonomicon as Best Graphic Novel.

In 2005, Watchmen was the only graphic novel to make it on to Time's "The 100 Best Novels from 1923 to the Present" list.

=== Eisner Awards ===
Best Writer

- 1988 Watchmen (DC)
- 1989 Batman: The Killing Joke (DC Comics)
- 1995 From Hell (Kitchen Sink)
- 1996 From Hell (Kitchen Sink)
- 1997 From Hell (Kitchen Sink); Supreme (Maximum Press)
- 2000 The League of Extraordinary Gentlemen, Promethea, Tom Strong, Tomorrow Stories, Top 10 (America's Best Comics (ABC))
- 2001 The League of Extraordinary Gentlemen, Promethea, Tom Strong, Tomorrow Stories, Top 10 (ABC)
- 2004 The League of Extraordinary Gentlemen, Promethea, Smax, Tom Strong, Tom Strong's Terrific Tales (ABC)
- 2006 Promethea, Top 10: The Forty-Niners (ABC)

Best Writer/Artist

- 1988 With Dave Gibbons, Watchmen (DC)

Best Single Issue/Single Story

- 2000 Tom Strong #1: "How Tom Strong Got Started", with Chris Sprouse and Al Gordon (ABC)
- 2001 Promethea #10: "Sex, Stars, and Serpents", with J.H. Williams III and Mick Gray (ABC)

Best Serialized Story

- 1993 From Hell with Eddie Campbell in Taboo (SpiderBaby Graphix/Tundra)

Best Continuing Series

- 2001 Top 10, with Gene Ha and Zander Cannon (ABC)

Best Finite Series/Limited Series

- 1988 Watchmen, with Dave Gibbons (DC)
- 2003 The League of Extraordinary Gentlemen, Volume II, with Kevin O'Neill (ABC)

Best New Series

- 2000 Top 10, with Gene Ha and Zander Cannon (ABC)

Best Anthology

- 2000 Tomorrow Stories, with Rick Veitch, Kevin Nowlan, Melinda Gebbie and Jim Baikie (ABC)

Best Graphic Album/Best Graphic Album: New

- 1988 Watchmen, with Dave Gibbons (DC)
- 1989 Batman: The Killing Joke, with Brian Bolland (DC)
- 1994 A Small Killing, with Oscar Zarate (Dark Horse)
- 2006 Top 10: The Forty-Niners, with Gene Ha (ABC)

Best Graphic Album: Reprint

- 2000 From Hell, with Eddie Campbell (Eddie Campbell Comics)

The Will Eisner Award Hall of Fame

- Class of 2014

== Film adaptations ==
Due to the success of his comics, a number of filmmakers have expressed a desire to make film adaptations over the years. Moore himself has consistently opposed such ventures, stating that "I wanted to give comics a special place when I was writing things like Watchmen. I wanted to show off just what the possibilities of the comic book medium were, and films are completely different." Expressing similar sentiments, he also remarked that:

If we only see comics in relation to movies then the best that they will ever be is films that do not move. I found it, in the mid 80s, preferable to concentrate on those things that only comics could achieve. The way in which a tremendous amount of information could be included visually in every panel, the juxtapositions between what a character was saying and what the image that the reader was looking at would be. So in a sense ... most of my work from the 80s onwards was designed to be un-filmable.

The first film to be based upon Moore's work was From Hell in 2001, which was directed by the Hughes brothers. The film included a number of radical differences from the original comic, altering the main character from an older, conservative detective to a young character played by Johnny Depp. This was followed in 2003 with The League of Extraordinary Gentlemen, a film that also departed radically from the books, changing the ending from a mob war over the skies of London to the infiltration of a secret base in Tibet. For these two works, Moore was content to allow the filmmakers to do whatever they wished and removed himself from the process entirely. "As long as I could distance myself by not seeing them," he said, he could profit from the films while leaving the original comics untouched, "assured no one would confuse the two. This was probably naïve on my part."

His attitude changed after producer Martin Poll and screenwriter Larry Cohen filed a lawsuit against 20th Century Fox, alleging that the film The League of Extraordinary Gentlemen plagiarised an unproduced script they had written entitled Cast of Characters. According to Moore, "They seemed to believe that the head of 20th Century Fox called me up and persuaded me to steal this screenplay, turning it into a comic book they could then adapt back into a movie, to camouflage petty larceny." Moore testified in a deposition and found the process to be extremely unpleasant. Fox's settlement of the case insulted Moore, who interpreted it as an admission of guilt. In 2012, Moore claimed that he had sold the rights to these two works simply for the money; he did not expect the films ever to be made. He was simply "getting money for old rope". Moore said in an interview in 2012 that he had seen neither film.

In 2005 a film adaptation of Moore's V for Vendetta was released, produced by The Wachowskis and directed by James McTeigue. Producer Joel Silver said at a press conference for the Warner Bros.' V for Vendetta that fellow producer Lana Wachowski had talked with Moore, and that "[Moore] was very excited about what [Lana] had to say." Moore disputed this, reporting that he told Wachowski "I didn't want anything to do with films ... I wasn't interested in Hollywood," and demanded that DC Comics force Warner Bros to issue a public retraction and apology for Silver's "blatant lies". Although Silver called Moore directly to apologise, no public retraction appeared. Moore was quoted as saying that the comic book had been "specifically about things like fascism and anarchy. Those words, 'fascism' and 'anarchy,' occur nowhere in the film. It's been turned into a Bush-era parable by people too timid to set a political satire in their own country."

Moore also publicly criticised details of the script before the film's release, pointing to apparent laziness in the writing. "They don't know what British people have for breakfast, they couldn't be bothered [to find out]. 'Eggy in a basket' apparently. Now the US have 'eggs in a basket,' which is fried bread with a fried egg in a hole in the middle. I guess they thought we must eat that as well, and thought 'eggy in a basket' was a quaint and Olde Worlde version", he stated.

This conflict between Moore and DC Comics was the subject of an article in The New York Times on 12 March 2006, five days before the US release. In The New York Times article, Silver stated that about 20 years prior to the film's release he had met with Moore and Dave Gibbons when Silver acquired the film rights to V for Vendetta and Watchmen. Silver stated, "Alan was odd, but he was enthusiastic and encouraging us to do this. I had foolishly thought that he would continue feeling that way today, not realizing that he wouldn't." Moore did not deny this meeting or Silver's characterisation of Moore at that meeting, nor did Moore state that he advised Silver of his change of opinion in those approximately 20 years. The New York Times article also interviewed David Lloyd about Moore's reaction to the film's production, stating, "Mr Lloyd, the illustrator of V for Vendetta, also found it difficult to sympathize with Mr Moore's protests. When he and Mr Moore sold their film rights to the comic book, Mr Lloyd said: 'We didn't do it innocently. Neither myself nor Alan thought we were signing it over to a board of trustees who would look after it like it was the Dead Sea Scrolls.'"

Moore has subsequently stated that he wishes his name to be removed from all comic work that he does not own, including Watchmen and V for Vendetta, much as unhappy film directors often choose to have their names removed and be credited as "Alan Smithee". He also announced that he would not allow his name to be used in any future film adaptations of works he does not own, nor would he accept any money from such adaptations. This request was respected by the producers of the subsequent screen adaptations of his works: Constantine (2005) (based on a character created by Moore), the 2009 Watchmen film, the 2016 animated Batman: The Killing Joke film and the 2019 Watchmen series.

In a 2012 interview with LeftLion magazine, Moore was asked to put a figure on how much money he had turned down by refusing to be associated with these film adaptations. He estimated it to be "at least a few million dollars" and said:

You can't buy that kind of empowerment. To just know that as far as you are aware, you have not got a price; that there is not an amount of money large enough to make you compromise even a tiny bit of principle that, as it turned out, would make no practical difference anyway. I'd advise everyone to do it, otherwise you're going to end up mastered by money and that's not a thing you want ruling your life.

Moore has expressed criticism of modern superhero movies in general, which he once called a "blight" to cinema and "also to culture to a degree". He said in an October 2022 interview with The Guardian that the popularisation of the genre on the part of adults is an "infantilisation" that can act as "a precursor to fascism". Lamenting at how deeply such films became part of the culture, Moore commented:

I will always love and adore the comics medium but the comics industry and all of the stuff attached to it just became unbearable ... Hundreds of thousands of adults [are] lining up to see characters and situations that had been created to entertain the 12-year-old boys—and it was always boys—of 50 years ago. I didn't really think that superheroes were adult fare. I think that this was a misunderstanding born of what happened in the 1980s—to which I must put my hand up to a considerable share of the blame, though it was not intentional—when things like Watchmen were first appearing. There were an awful lot of headlines saying 'Comics Have Grown Up'. I tend to think that, no, comics hadn't grown up. There were a few titles that were more adult than people were used to. But the majority of comics titles were pretty much the same as they'd ever been. It wasn't comics growing up. I think it was more comics meeting the emotional age of the audience coming the other way.

During a September 2023 interview with The Telegraph, Moore reiterated this view, saying that what had appealed to him most about output from comics publishers was "no more", saying, "Now they're called 'graphic novels', which sounds sophisticated and you can charge a lot more for them. These innocent and inventive and imaginative superhero characters from the '40s, '50s and '60s are being recycled to a modern audience as if they were adult fare." During that same interview, journalist Jake Kerridge asked Moore if it was true that he divided the money he had received from onscreen adaptations of his work among the writers and other staffpersons of those productions. Moore replied, "I no longer wish it to even be shared with them. I don't really feel, with the recent films, that they have stood by what I assumed were their original principles. So I asked for DC Comics to send all of the money from any future TV series or films to Black Lives Matter."

=== List of feature film adaptations ===
Year	Title	Director(s)	Studio(s)	Based on	Budget	Box office	Rotten Tomatoes
Year	Title	Director(s)	Studio(s)	Based on	USD$		Rotten Tomatoes
2001	From Hell	Albert Hughes and Allen Hughes	20th Century Fox	From Hell by Moore and Eddie Campbell	$35 million	$74.5 million	57%
2003	The League of Extraordinary Gentlemen	Stephen Norrington	20th Century Fox; Angry Films; International Production Company; JD Productions	The League of Extraordinary Gentlemen by Moore and Kevin O'Neill	$78 million	$179.3 million	17%
2005	V for Vendetta	James McTeigue	Warner Bros. Virtual Studios; Silver Pictures; Anarchos Productions	V for Vendetta by Moore and David Lloyd	$54 million	$132.5 million	73%
2009	Watchmen	Zack Snyder	Warner Bros. Paramount Pictures; Legendary Pictures; Lawrence Gordon Productions; DC Entertainment	Watchmen by Moore and Dave Gibbons	$130 million	$185.3 million	65%
2016	Batman: The Killing Joke	Sam Liu	Warner Bros. DC Entertainment; Warner Bros. Animation	Batman: The Killing Joke by Moore and Brian Bolland	$3.5 million	$4.3 million	48%

== Personal life ==
Since his teenage years Moore has had long hair, and since early adulthood has also had a beard. He has taken to wearing a number of large rings on his hands, leading him to be described as a "cross between Hagrid and Danny from Withnail and I" who could be easily mistaken for "the village eccentric". Born and raised in Northampton, he continues to live in the town, and used its history as a basis for his novels Voice of the Fire and Jerusalem.

With his first wife Phyllis, whom he married in the early 1970s, he has two daughters: Leah and Amber. The couple also had a mutual lover, Deborah, although the relationship between the three ended in the early 1990s as Phyllis and Deborah left Moore, taking his daughters with them. On 12 May 2007, he married Melinda Gebbie, with whom he has worked on several comics, most notably Lost Girls.

His "unassuming terraced" Northampton home was described by an interviewer in 2001 as "something like an occult bookshop under permanent renovation, with records, videos, magical artefacts and comic-book figurines strewn among shelves of mystical tomes and piles of paper. The bathroom, with blue-and-gold décor and a generous sunken tub, is palatial; the rest of the house has possibly never seen a vacuum cleaner. This is clearly a man who spends little time on the material plane." He likes to live in his home town, feeling that it affords him a level of obscurity that he enjoys, remarking that "I never signed up to be a celebrity." He has spoken in praise of the town's former Radical MP, Charles Bradlaugh, at his annual commemoration. He is also a vegetarian.

Moore is a member of Northampton Arts Lab and takes walks with the novelist Alistair Fruish.

As of September 2023, Moore was said to be living "a quiet life in Northampton, England."

=== Religion and magic ===
In 1993, on his fortieth birthday, Moore openly declared his dedication to being a ceremonial magician, something he saw as "a logical end step to my career as a writer". According to a 2001 interview, his inspiration for doing this came when he was writing From Hell in the early 1990s, a book containing much Freemasonic and occult symbolism: "One word balloon in From Hell completely hijacked my life ... A character says something like, 'The one place gods inarguably exist is in the human mind'. After I wrote that, I realised I'd accidentally made a true statement, and now I'd have to rearrange my entire life around it. The only thing that seemed to really be appropriate was to become a magician." Moore associates magic very much with writing; "I believe that magic is art, and that art, whether that be music, writing, sculpture, or any other form, is literally magic. Art is, like magic, the science of manipulating symbols, words or images, to achieve changes in consciousness ... Indeed to cast a spell is simply to spell, to manipulate words, to change people's consciousness, and this is why I believe that an artist or writer is the closest thing in the contemporary world to a shaman."

Monotheism is, to me, a great simplification. I mean the Qabalah has a great multiplicity of gods, but at the very top of the Qabalic Tree of Life, you have this one sphere that is absolute God, the Monad, something which is indivisible. All of the other gods, and indeed everything else in the universe, is a kind of emanation of that God. Now, that's fine, but it's when you suggest that there is only that one God, at this kind of unreachable height above humanity, and there is nothing in between, you're limiting and simplifying the thing. I tend to think of paganism as a kind of alphabet, as a language, it's like all of the gods are letters in that language. They express nuances, shades of meaning or certain subtleties of ideas, whereas monotheism tends to just be one vowel and it's just something like 'oooooooo'. It's a monkey sound.

— Alan Moore

Connecting his esoteric beliefs with his career in writing, he conceptualised a hypothetical area known as the "Idea Space", describing it as "... a space in which mental events can be said to occur, an idea space which is perhaps universal. Our individual consciousnesses have access to this vast universal space, just as we have individual houses, but the street outside the front door belongs to everybody. It's almost as if ideas are pre-existing forms within this space ... The landmasses that might exist in this mind space would be composed entirely of ideas, of concepts, that instead of continents and islands you might have large belief systems, philosophies, Marxism might be one, Judeo-Christian religions might make up another." He subsequently believed that to navigate this space, magical systems like the tarot and the Qabalah would have to be used.

Taking up the study of the Qabalah and the writings of the early 20th-century occultist Aleister Crowley, Moore accepted ideas from Crowley's religion, Thelema, about True Will being connected to the will of the pantheistic universe. In some of his earlier magical rituals, he used mind-altering psychedelic drugs but later gave this up, believing that they were unnecessary, and stated, "It's frightening. You call out the names in this strange incomprehensible language, and you're looking into the glass and there appears to be this little man talking to you. It just works."

Moore took as his primary deity the ancient Roman snake god Glycon, who was the centre of a cult founded by a prophet known as Alexander of Abonoteichus, and according to Alexander's critic Lucian, the god itself was merely a puppet, something Moore accepts, considering him to be a "complete hoax", but dismisses as irrelevant. According to Pagan Studies scholar Ethan Doyle-White, "The very fact that Glycon was probably one big hoax was enough to convince Moore to devote himself to the scaly lord, for, as Moore maintains, the imagination is just as real as reality." Moore has an altar to Glycon at his home.

=== Political views ===
Moore politically identifies as an anarchist, and outlined his interpretation of anarchist philosophy, and its application to fiction writing in an interview with Margaret Killjoy, collected in the 2009 book, Mythmakers and Lawbreakers:

I believe that all other political states are in fact variations or outgrowths of a basic state of anarchy; after all, when you mention the idea of anarchy to most people they will tell you what a bad idea it is because the biggest gang would just take over. Which is pretty much how I see contemporary society. We live in a badly developed anarchist situation in which the biggest gang has taken over and have declared that it is not an anarchist situation – that it is a capitalist or a communist situation. But I tend to think that anarchy is the most natural form of politics for a human being to actually practice.

In December 2011, Moore responded to Frank Miller's attack on the Occupy movement, calling his more recent work misogynistic, homophobic and misguided. Worldwide, Occupy protesters adopted the Guy Fawkes mask from V for Vendetta. The mask has also been adopted by Anonymous, Egyptian revolutionaries, and anti-globalisation demonstrators. Moore described Occupy as "ordinary people reclaiming rights which should always have been theirs", and added:

I can't think of any reason why as a population we should be expected to stand by and see a gross reduction in the living standards of ourselves and our kids, possibly for generations, when the people who have got us into this have been rewarded for it – they've certainly not been punished in any way because they're too big to fail. I think that the Occupy movement is, in one sense, the public saying that they should be the ones to decide who's too big to fail. As an anarchist, I believe that power should be given to the people whose lives this is actually affecting.

Moore is a member of The Arts Emergency Service, a British charity working with 16- to 19-year-olds in further education from diverse backgrounds.

In August 2016, Moore endorsed Jeremy Corbyn's campaign in the Labour Party leadership election. In the 2017 UK general election, Moore expressed guarded support for the Labour Party, mainly due to the left-wing socialist Corbyn being elected leader, although he does not vote as a matter of political principle. In November 2019, Moore again expressed guarded support for Labour, saying that he was voting for the first time in over forty years. He wrote: "Although my vote is principally against the Tories rather than for Labour, I'd observe that Labour's current manifesto is the most encouraging set of proposals that I've ever seen from any major British party. Though these are immensely complicated times and we are all uncertain as to which course we should take, I'd say the one that steers us furthest from the glaringly apparent iceberg is the safest bet."

In 2022, Moore published a letter supporting Brazilian presidential candidate Luiz Inácio Lula da Silva from the Workers' Party.

=== On conspiracy theories ===
Doing research into conspiracy theories for his work on Brought to Light, Moore came to develop his own view about why people accept conspiracy theories, stating:

Yes, there is a conspiracy, indeed there are a great number of conspiracies, all tripping each other up ... the main thing that I learned about conspiracy theories is that conspiracy theorists actually believe in the conspiracy because that is more comforting. The truth of the world is that it is chaotic. The truth is, that it is not the Jewish banking conspiracy, or the grey aliens, or the twelve-foot reptiloids from another dimension that are in control, the truth is far more frightening; no-one is in control, the world is rudderless.

=== On comic book writing and style ===
Despite his advocacy for creator-owned comics, Moore has expressed dissatisfaction with the output of independent comic companies, stating in a 1985 essay that, "With a very few bold exceptions, most of the creator-owned material produced by the independent companies has been indistinguishable from the mainstream product that preceded it." Moore has also criticised his own overuse of "a basic elliptical plot structure, where elements at the beginning of the story mirror events which are to happen at the end ... acting as bookends to give the story that takes place in between a sense of neatness and unity." He has also faulted his own excessive use of overlapping or coincidental dialogue in scene transitions.

Moore explained his preference for comic book writing over other mediums: "In comics, I have complete control, other than the input of my artists... every full stop and comma that I put down on that script is going to end up in the finished comic." Moore complimented Frank Miller's realistic use of minimal dialogue in fight scenes, which "move very fast, flowing from image to image with the speed of a real-life conflict, unimpeded by the reader having to stop to read a lot of accompanying text".

== Selected bibliography ==
Comics

- Marvelman/Miracleman (1982–1984, 1985–1989)
- V for Vendetta (1982–1985, 1988–1989)
- Skizz (1983–1985)
- The Ballad of Halo Jones (1984–1986)
- Swamp Thing (1984–1987)
- For the Man Who Has Everything (1985)
- Superman: Whatever Happened to the Man of Tomorrow? (1986)
- Watchmen (1986–1987)
- Batman: The Killing Joke (1988)
- From Hell (1989–1996)
- Big Numbers (1990)
- A Small Killing (1991)
- Lost Girls (1991–1992, 2006)
- Top 10 (1999–2001)
- Promethea (1999–2005)
- Tom Strong (1999–2006)
- The League of Extraordinary Gentlemen (1999–2019)
- The Courtyard (2003)
- Neonomicon (2010)
- Fashion Beast (2012–2013)
- Providence (2015–2017)

Novels

- Voice of the Fire (1996)
- Jerusalem (2016)
- The Great When: A Long London Novel (2024)
- I Hear a New World (2026)

Short stories

- Illuminations (2022)

Non-fiction

- Alan Moore's Writing for Comics (2003)

== See also ==
- List of comic creators
- List of Comics Journal interview subjects
- List of Eisner Award winners
- List of English writers
- List of Harvey Award winners
- List of occultists
- List of postmodern authors
- List of science fiction authors
