= Twilight of the Superheroes =

Unproduced comic book proposal

Twilight of the Superheroes is the title of a proposed comic book crossover that writer Alan Moore submitted to DC Comics in 1987 before his split with the company. Although various elements suggested by Moore later occurred in various comics, Twilight was never produced. The proposal gained fame after surfacing on the internet in the 1990s where its status as a lost work by one of the superstars of the medium, as well as its dark treatment of superheroes, garnered much attention.

The title refers to Ragnarök from Norse mythology. The story was to be set two decades in the future of the DC Universe and would feature the ultimate final battle between the heroes of Earth, including the older and younger generations of superheroes, as well as the supervillains and some extraterrestrials who inhabited Earth in the DC continuity. Twilight was conceived as a standalone limited series which could also be tied to ongoing titles at the other writers' consent, much like the then-recent 12-issue limited series Crisis on Infinite Earths.

The complete text of the proposal was published in December 2020 by DC Comics.

== Background ==
Various web sources preface the proposal by claiming that it originated in 1987, after Moore had made a name for himself with comics such as Swamp Thing before his departure from DC. The proposal itself is prefaced with a disquisition in which Moore talks about his thoughts on the superhero genre, the problems of crossovers as a marketing and storytelling device, and his overall goals with the project. With regard to superheroes, Moore stated that one problem with the genre was the lack of a definitive end to the story of most heroes; in the manner that the Norse Gods, for instance, had a definitive end. He felt that this prevented superheroes from achieving the iconic status that they might otherwise acquire and praised Frank Miller's Batman: The Dark Knight Returns as an effort to provide such an end point for at least one DC hero. On the subject of crossovers as a storytelling tool, Moore criticised them as either forcing other books to make tentative connections to a central storyline, or forcing readers to buy comics they otherwise would not for fear of not understanding the storyline. His goal for the Twilight proposal was to address both of these concerns by providing an end point for the DC superhero universe, as well as providing a crossover which would logically tie into the company's various books without forcing readers to buy numerous titles.

== The proposal ==
The framing device of the story involves future versions of John Constantine and Rip Hunter travelling to the present day, ostensibly to prevent a catastrophe involving the superheroes of their time. The hook through which the series would connect with other titles is the attempts of the two time travelers to recruit others into their quest to alter the future through warning them of upcoming events. Individual books in the DC Universe could tie into the crossover or not, as their creators wished, by having Hunter or Constantine show up and warn the stars of the book of some event. The main narrative of the series involves Constantine relating the story of what has happened in the future to his present-day self over drinks in a bar.

The series was set in the future where the world is ruled by superheroic dynasties, including the House of Steel (presided over by Superman and his wife Wonder Woman) and the House of Thunder (consisting of the Marvel Family) as well as houses built around the Teen Titans, the Justice League, and an alliance of supervillains. The Houses of Steel and Thunder are about to unite through the marriage of Superboy and Mary Marvel Jr., the daughter of Captain Marvel and Mary Marvel, with their combined power potentially threatening the status quo, and several characters attempt to stop it. One group of opponents is a shadowy cabal of non-powered heroes led by Batman. Another involves an alien alliance of the Green Lantern Corps, Martians, and Thanagarians. Constantine's narrative of the future ends with a massive battle between the various factions, resulting in the death of most of the superpowered characters.

A side story would show a decaying superhero ghetto where decrepit versions of old heroes live. In the final part of the present time framing device it would be revealed that Hunter and Constantine had traveled back in time not to prevent the future they came from, but to ensure its coming true. The final battle depicted in the book resulted in humanity being freed from the control of superheroes, a prospect that Hunter and Constantine supported.

The series would have restored the DC Multiverse, which had been eliminated in the 1985 mini-series Crisis on Infinite Earths, but the series would also have been a significantly darker take on DC characters than had previously been published, with many of the future versions of the heroes depicted as murderers, perverts, and tyrants. A central plot element of the series, for example, involves the Question investigating the bondage-themed murder of someone who turns out to be Billy Batson.

In the end, the wedding between the Houses of Thunder and Steel is attacked by the allied houses and the alien army, killing many heroes including Superman and Martian Manhunter, who had killed Batson under the guise of a call girl and disguised himself as Captain Marvel. After the alien army appear victorious, Batman's army of non-powered superheroes, aided by Constantine, attack and reveal that Constantine had made a dealer with the armies of the antimatter universe Qward to invade their own homeworlds and force them away from Earth. As Constantine and Rip Hunter talk, the former realizes that a lot of what came to pass did because of what his future counterpart told him he should do, and after reading a letter from his future self, is angered at being outsmarted. He thus takes revenge, and aims to prevent that future from happening, by turning down talking with a woman whom his future self married.

== Legacy ==
The series was never commissioned, but copies of Moore's detailed notes have appeared on the Internet and in print, despite the efforts of DC, which considers the proposal its property. A number of story elements from Twilight of the Superheroes have made their way into works later published by DC Comics. The 1991 crossover Armageddon 2001, for example, involves a messenger from the future traveling to the present to convince superheroes to avoid a disastrous future. A dark future vision of superheroes as irresponsible was shown in the series Kingdom Come, although Alex Ross would later state that he had already come up with the series concept and not heard of Moore's proposal until James Robinson noted the similarities. DC later introduced a more flexible approach to continuity, similar to what Moore proposed, with the idea of Hypertime. Finally, the miniseries Infinite Crisis, along with the series 52, reintroduced the multiverse to DC comics. Other changes to individual characters that appear in the proposal, such as the Teen Titan Cyborg becoming almost wholly mechanical, were introduced as well.

=== Internet leak and publication ===
As the years passed after Moore's departure from DC, the proposal for Twilight started to leak onto various websites on the Internet. For a time, there was some speculation as to the document's authenticity, but this was confirmed by both DC and Moore.

DC eventually published the proposal in its entirety, in December 2020, in the anthology volume "DC Through The '80s: The End of Eras".
