= John Caldwell (cartoonist) =

American cartoonist

- Born: March 23, 1946
- Died: February 21, 2016 (aged 69)
- Areas: Cartoonist, Publisher

John F. Caldwell (March 23, 1946 – February 21, 2016) was a nationally syndicated American gag cartoonist primarily known for his work in National Lampoon and Mad, where he was a member of "The Usual Gang of Idiots."

Following his death, The Comics Reporter described him as having had "one of the most prolific and successful [cartooning] careers of the late 20th Century."

== Education ==
Caldwell never received any actual training as a cartoonist, but he attended the Parsons School of Design, where his general art education helped him prepare for a cartooning career. He spent 1969–70 working for the State of New York as a cartographer.

== Career ==
Caldwell's drawings appeared in numerous publications, including Writer's Digest, Playboy, Barron's, the New Yorker, the Wall Street Journal, Reader's Digest and Harvard Business Review. He designed greeting cards for Recycled Paper Greetings and Nobleworks.

In an oddity, one of Caldwell's better-known cartoons was never officially published. He wrote and drew a gag front cover depicting the mascot Alfred E. Neuman having taken a wrong turn away from the New York Marathon route, jogging into a murder scene, and cluelessly breaking through yellow crime scene tape in triumph. The issue, #411, was already at the printer when the 9/11 attacks happened. The joke which depicted downtown Manhattan and a dead body was no longer appropriate in light of the real world events. A replacement cover was swiftly produced, showing a closely cropped head shot of Neuman, his trademark tooth gap filled in by a small American flag.

== Death ==
Aged 69, Caldwell died February 21, 2016, from cancer. He was survived by his wife Diane, as well as a daughter and grandson.

== Books ==
- Running A Muck: A Bunch of Zany Cartoons (Writer's Digest Books, 1978) ISBN 978-0-911654-60-8
- Mug Shots: A Splendid Collection of Cartoons (Fantaco, 1980)
- The Book of Ultimates (McGraw-Hill, 1983) ISBN 978-0-07-009608-0
- Caldwell (Fawcett Columbine, 1988) ISBN 978-0-449-90266-0
- Fax This Book: Over 100 Sit-Up-and-Take-Notice Cover Sheets for Better Business (Workman, 1990) ISBN 978-0-89480-807-4
- Faxable Greeting Cards (Workman, 1991) ISBN 978-1-56305-006-0

== Sources ==
- Glasbergen, Randy. How to Be a Successful Cartoonist. North Light Books, 1996.
