= Stephen R. Bissette =

American comics artist (born 1955)

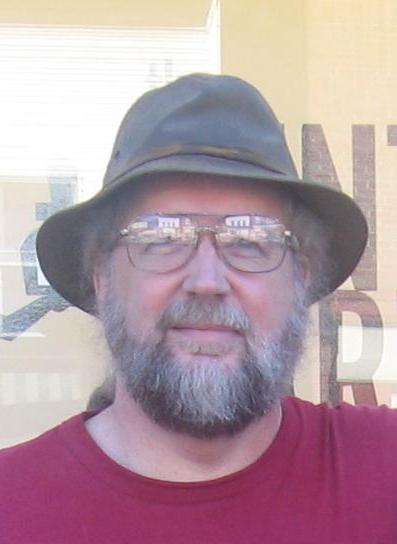
- Bissette in 2007
- Born: March 14, 1955 (age 71) Vermont, U.S.
- Areas: Writer, Penciller, Artist, Editor, Publisher
- Notable works: Swamp Thing; Taboo; Tyrant
- Awards: Jack Kirby Award, 1985, 1986, 1987; Eisner Award, 1993

Stephen R. Bissette (/bəˈsɛt/; born March 14, 1955) is an American comic book artist and publisher with a focus on the horror genre. He worked with writer Alan Moore and inker John Totleben on the DC Comics series Swamp Thing in the 1980s.

== Early life ==
Bissette was born and raised in Vermont, and was raised Catholic.

== Career ==
=== Early work ===
Shortly after the publication of his first work, Abyss (1976), Bissette enrolled in the first class of The Kubert School. Before his first year was completed, his work was being published professionally in the pages of Sojourn, Sgt. Rock, and Heavy Metal. In 1978, Bissette was among the Kubert School's first graduating class, along with classmates Rick Veitch, Tom Yeates, and others.

While still enrolled at The Kubert School, Bissette executed the logo for early New Jersey synth-pop band WKGB and drew the cover for the band's 1979 single "Non-Stop/Ultramarine" on Fetish Records (UK Fetish 002).

His early work appeared in the pages of Heavy Metal, Epic Illustrated, Bizarre Adventures, Scholastic Corporation's Weird Worlds and Bananas illustrating stories written by Goosebumps founder and author R. L. Stine, and he worked with Rick Veitch on the graphic novelization of Steven Spielberg's motion picture 1941.

=== Horror master ===
Bissette is best known for his multiple award-winning collaboration with writer Alan Moore and inker John Totleben on DC Comics' Saga of the Swamp Thing (1983–1987).

Under the company name of Spiderbaby Grafix, he later published the horror anthology Taboo, the original home of Moore and Eddie Campbell's From Hell, and Tim Lucas' Throat Sprockets, illustrated by Mike Hoffman and David Lloyd. He created Tyrant, a comic book biography of a Tyrannosaurus rex, which lasted four issues. During this period, he edited the horror anthology Gore Shriek, published by FantaCo Enterprises.

Since 1991, Bissette has presented a lecture series on horror comics called "Journeys into Fear". Having since grown in scope into a five-part series, "Journeys into Fear" identifies 12th century Japanese ghost scrolls and the 16th century Mixtec codices as early ancestors, and traces the genre from its roots in Winsor McCay's work such as Dream of the Rarebit Fiend. In 1996–1997, Bissette contributed five covers for a comic book series about another swamp monster, Hall of Heroes' Bog Swamp Demon.

=== Other work ===
Bissette subsequently worked with Moore, Totleben, and Rick Veitch on the Image Comics' limited series 1963, their final creative collaborative effort. From 1963, Bissette owns the characters Hypernaut, N-Man, and the Fury.

Scott McCloud's 24-hour comic project began as a dare to Bissette in 1990. Each created a 24-page comic in 24 hours. The 24-hour comics project evolved into a challenge taken up by numerous hopeful contributors, with several published collections, and inspired other time-limited creative projects. Bissette published the story A Life in black and white in his own comic book anthology SpiderBaby Comix #2 (SpiderBaby Graphix, 1997).

In 1993, Bissette and Stanley Wiater co-edited Comic Book Rebels: Conversations with the Creators of the New Comics (Dutton, ISBN 1-55611-355-2), which featured interviews with such notable comics creators as Scott McCloud, Harvey Pekar, Dave Sim, Howard Cruse, Will Eisner, Peter Laird, Kevin Eastman, and Robert Crumb.

=== Retirement and teaching ===
Bissette retired from the comics industry in 1999, alluding to what he termed a "generational shift." He teaches courses in Comic Art History, Drawing, and Film at the Center for Cartoon Studies in White River Junction, Vermont

Since 2005, Bissette has also edited and published Green Mountain Cinema, a trade paperback journal devoted to the independent cinema scene in his home state of Vermont, as well as five volumes of Blur, collecting his film reviews and criticism.

The Stephen R. Bissette Collection at Henderson State University in Arkadelphia, Arkansas, houses Bissette's works and memorabilia.

== Personal life ==
As of 2009, Bissette lives in Vermont.

== Awards ==
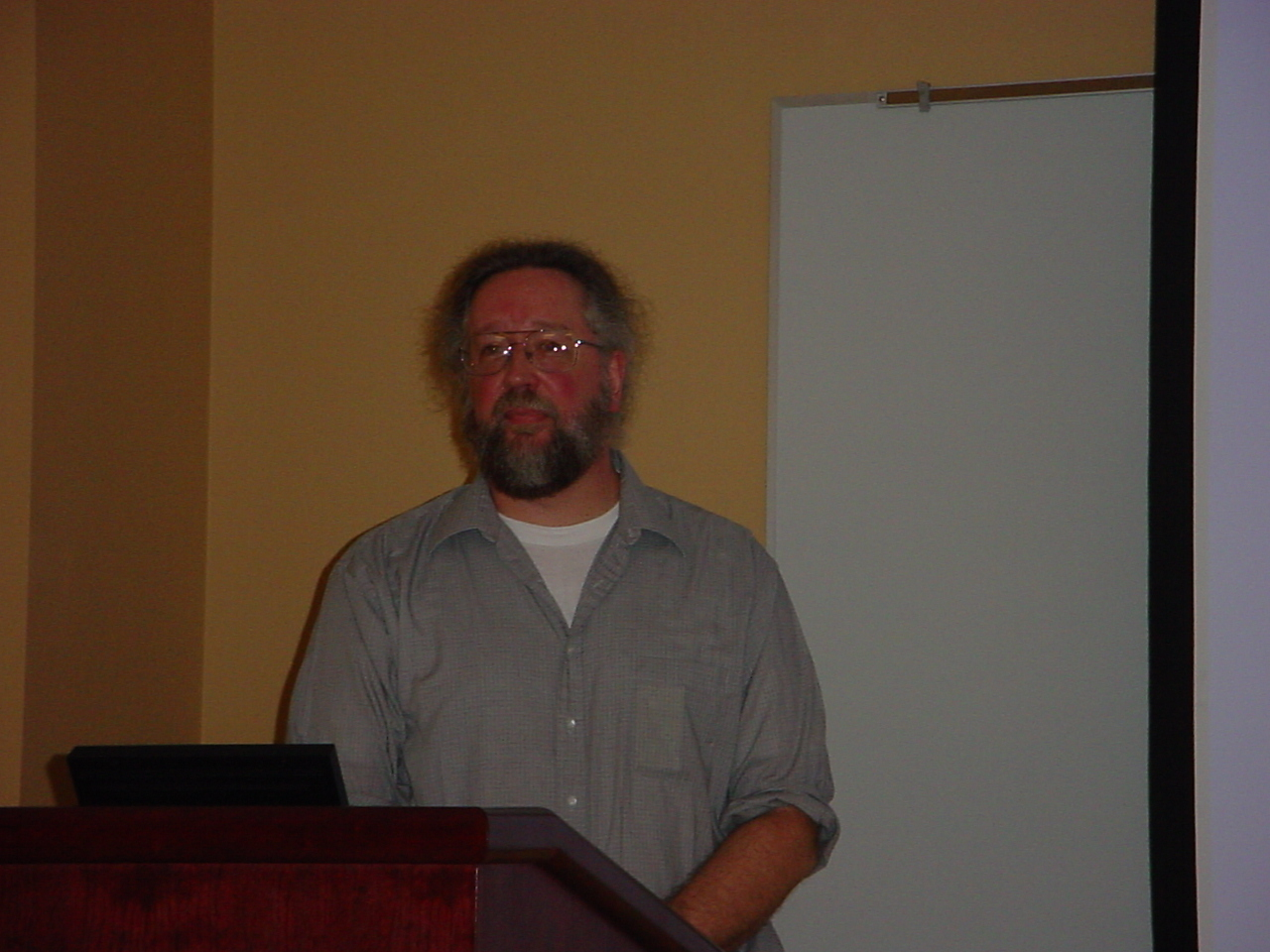
Stephen R. Bissette lecturing in 2005

Bissette's work with Alan Moore and John Totleben earned the 1985 "Best Single Issue" Jack Kirby Award for Swamp Thing Annual #2, and the 1985, 1986, and 1987 Jack Kirby Awards for "Best Continuing Series" for Swamp Thing. His work with John Totleben earned them the 1985 "Best Art Team" Jack Kirby Award for Swamp Thing. Taboo won the "Best Anthology" Eisner Award in 1993.

His work with Alan Moore and John Totleben earned a nomination for the 1985 "Best Single Issue" Jack Kirby Award for Swamp Thing #34. Bissette and Totleben earned nominations for the 1986 and 1987 Jack Kirby Awards for "Best Art Team" for their work on Swamp Thing. Bissette and Moore were nominated for the 1986 Jack Kirby Award for "Best Writer/Artist (Single or Team)". Bissette was nominated for the "Best Editor" Eisner Award in 1993 for Taboo and received an Inkpot Award in 1997.

== Bibliography ==
=== Aardvark-Vanaheim ===
- Cerebus #116 (text article), 139, 159, 184–185 (1988–1994)

=== Archie Comics ===
- Mighty Crusaders #10 (1984)

=== Atomeka Press ===
- A1 Bojeffries Terror Tome #1 (letterer) (2005)

=== Comico Comics ===
- Elementals #9 (1986)

=== Dark Horse Comics ===
- Aliens: Havoc #2 (1997)
- Dark Horse Presents #37, 143 (1990–1999)
- Godzilla, King of the Monsters Special #1 (1987)

=== DC Comics ===
- G.I. Combat #218 (1980)
- House of Mystery #299, 310 (1981–1982)
- Neil Gaiman's Midnight Days TPB (2000)
- Saga of the Swamp Thing #16–17, 19, 21–27, 29–30, 34–36 (1983–1985)
- Secrets of Haunted House #46 (1982)
- Sgt. Rock #311 ("A Song for Saigon Sally"), #321 ("Live by the Sword... Die by the Sword!", script; art by Thomas Yeates), #323 ("Dead Shot", script by Robert Kanigher), #335, 343, 345–346 (1977–1980)
- Swamp Thing #39–42, 44, 46, 50, 59, 64, 78, Annual #2, 4 (1985–1988)
- The Unexpected #191, 214 (1979–1981)

=== Eclipse Comics ===
- Bedlam #1–2 (1985)
- Fearbook #1 (1986)
- Real War Stories #1 (1987)

=== FantaCo Enterprises ===
- Alien Encounters #1 (1981)
- Gore Shriek #1, 4–6 (1986–1990)
- Gore Shriek Delectus #1 (1989)

=== HM Communications ===
- Heavy Metal #v2 #5–7, #v3 #6, 9–10, #v4 #2, #v5 #5, #v7 #3 (1978–1983)

=== Image Comics ===
- 1963 #2–4 (1993)

=== Kitchen Sink Press ===
- Taboo #8–9 (1995)

=== Mad Love Publishing ===
- AARGH (Artists Against Rampant Government Homophobia) #1 (1988)

=== Marvel Comics ===
- Amazing High Adventure #4 (1986)
- Bizarre Adventures #31, 33 (1982)
- Epic Illustrated #2, 6 (1980–1981)
- Marvel Preview #18, 23 (1979–1980)
- Timespirits #4 (1985)

=== Spiderbaby Grafix ===
- SpiderBaby Comix #1-2 (1996–1997)
- Taboo #1–7 (1988–1992)
- Taboo Especial #1 (1991)
- Tyrant #1–4 (1994–1996)

Preceded by Bo Hampton	The Saga of the Swamp Thing / Swamp Thing artist 1983–1986	Succeeded by Rick Veitch
