= Dennis Daniel =

American actor

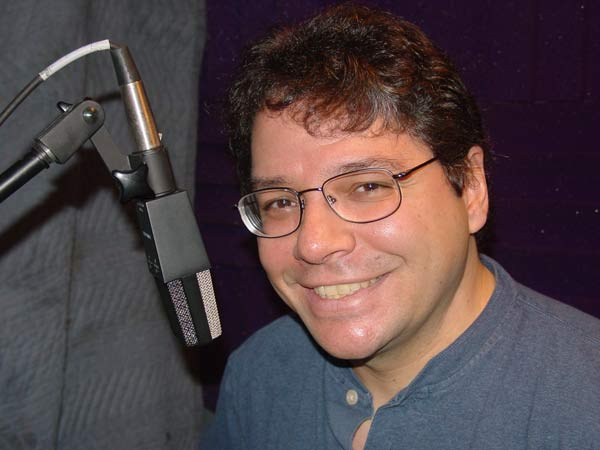
- Dennis Daniel in the studio
- Occupations: Radio, TV, and Film Voice Actor; Disc Jockey; Writer; Director

Dennis Daniel is an American radio, TV and film voice actor and disc jockey. Daniel also writes and directs TV commercials. He is an author of books and a critic on the horror film genre.

== Career ==
Dennis is a DJ, copywriter, voice performer, and director at Long Island radio stations. Daniel won a 1984 Clio Award. In 1998 and 1999 Daniel produced two double CDs based on the works of Edgar Allan Poe. He is the author of the book, The Famous Monsters Chronicles and Tales Of The Tape, a book about his years in radio as well as the magazine "Famous Monsters of Filmland". He also has contributed to several books, including "The Deep Red Horror Handbook", "Deep Red Book 7" "Famous Monsters Chronicles II. Daniel voiced several puppet characters for the PBS children's educational show Kid Fitness. Dennis has lectured at several NAB Conventions is Las Vegas.
