= The Bojeffries Saga =

Comic series by Alan Moore

- Cover of The Complete Bojeffries Saga (1992), art by Steve Parkhouse.
- Created by: Alan Moore and Steve Parkhouse

Publication information
- Publisher: Quality Communications; Atomeka Press; Fantagraphics; Upshot Graphics
Title(s)
Warrior #12–13, 19–20
A1 #1–4
The A1 True Life Bikini Confidential
- Formats: Original material for the series has been published as a strip in the comics anthology(s) Warrior and A1.
- Genre: Horror, humour/comedy
- Publication date: August 1983 – 1991

Creative team
- Writer(s): Alan Moore
- Artist(s): Steve Parkhouse

Reprints
- Collected editions
- The Complete Bojeffries Saga: ISBN 1-879450-65-8
- The Bojeffries Saga: ISBN 978-1-60309-063-6

The Bojeffries Saga is a series of comics stories written by Alan Moore and drawn by Steve Parkhouse which have been published by a number of different companies since their debut in 1983 in the UK comics anthology Warrior.

It features an eccentric English family of werewolves, vampires and monsters in various peculiar tales.

== Publication history ==
The first Bojeffries tale – "The Rentman Cometh" – appeared in black and white form in the British Quality Communications anthology Warrior No. 12 (Aug 1983), with three further stories appearing in Warrior to July 1984. A fifth story was published in the eighth issue of the Fantagraphics publication Dalgoda (April 1986), and the four Quality issues were "reprinted, coloured and reformatted", for Flesh and Bones #1–4 from Upshot Graphics.

Between May 1989 and April 1990, a further four tales were published by Atomeka Press as part of its all-star anthology title A1 issues #1–4, with a fifth appearing in the A1 True Life Bikini Confidential (Feb 1991). In 1992, Tundra Publishing (the company set up by Kevin Eastman with profits from his co-creation of the Teenage Mutant Ninja Turtles) reprinted the ten Bojeffries stories together with an introduction from Lenny Henry and four new illustration-stories: three cut-outs and a recipe.

In 2004, the prologue created for Dalgoda #8 and the first two-part story from Warrior (reformatted for Flesh and Bones) were reprinted in the A1: Big Issue Zero as a reminder of the A1 style, before the then-upcoming 2005 relaunch. The relaunch stuttered, however, and the new ongoing A1 series never appeared. It had been intended for the reprinted stories to form the foundation for the A1: Bojeffries Terror Tomes a three-issue series with each issue focusing on a different member of the family, starting with Festus. Although previews of the finished stories were made available in February 2005, with an anticipated launch in April, no new titles were published.

In 2004 Parkhouse suggested there would be no more stories. In contrast, A1-editor Dave Elliott and Gary Spencer Millidge (editor of Alan Moore: Portrait of an Extraordinary Gentleman) have both suggested there will be more stories while longtime Moore-collaborator, Kevin O'Neill said, in September 2008, that Moore was taking breaks from working with him on The League of Extraordinary Gentlemen, Volume III: Century to finish the finale of the Bojeffries Saga, which was for the new collection from Top Shelf.

== Influences and reception ==
Comedian and high-profile comics-fan Lenny Henry (who wrote the introduction to the 1992 Tundra Press collection) described the series as "weird", recalling that the series' arrival in Warrior was "a breath of fresh air, bringing an anarchy and weirdness to comics similar to the kick up the arse that The Young Ones brought to television. It was different. Alan Moore and Steve Parkhouse had created a group of people you wouldn't want to be in the same universe as – let alone the same room..."

The Independent described the series as "The Munsters written by Alan Bennett high on episodes of Coronation Street, all beautifully rendered in a style equal parts Robert Crumb and the Bash Street Kids' Leo Baxendale".

In a 2004 interview Parkhouse said that the story was not influenced by Charles Addams, but drew more on his time in South London as a child. He "wanted it to be uniquely British and reflect life as I saw it". Lenny Henry noted "Lord Snooty this wasn't", launching alongside "'Marvelman', 'V for Vendetta', 'Shandor', 'Laser Eraser and Pressbutton' and... Zirk" in the ubiquitous UK comics publication Warrior. The British-ness of the strip was underlined by its setting – a council house in Northampton – as well as its initial storyline (dealing with rent collection) and the new material created for the Tundra Complete Bojeffries Saga in the British Annual tradition. This trope would be used by Moore ten years later in his and Kevin O'Neill's The League of Extraordinary Gentlemen collections.

== Characters ==
The Bojeffries Saga is the story of a family living in a council house in Northampton, England (not coincidentally the hometown of writer Moore). The family is made up of:

- Jobremus Bojeffries (father)
- Ginda Bojeffries (daughter)
- Reth Bojeffries (son)
- The baby (which appears nuclear)
- Uncle Raoul Zlüdotny (a werewolf)
- Uncle Festus Zlüdotny (a vampire)
- Grandpa Podlasp (whose form is amorphous)
- Trevor Inchmale, a rent collector who appears in the initial stories

== Publication ==
Short stories created for various publications and publishers:

- "The Rentman Cometh" [black & white] (in Warrior No. 12, August 1983); [colour] (in Flesh and Bones No. 1, 1986)
- "One of our Rentmen is missing" [black & white] (in Warrior No. 13, October 1983); [colour] (in Flesh and Bones No. 2, 1986)
- "Raoul's Night Out" Parts I–II [black & white] (in Warrior #19–20, June and July 1984); [colour] (in Flesh and Bones #3–4, 1986)
- "Batfishing in Suburbia" (prologue) (in Dalgoda No. 8, April 1986)
- "Festus: Dawn of the Dead" (in A1 #1, May 1989)
- "Sex with Ginda Bojeffries" (in A1 #2, September 1989)
- "A Quiet Christmas with the Family" (in A1 #3, February 1990)
- "Song of the Terraces" (in A1 #4, April 1990)
- "Our Factory Fortnight" (panels & text in the UK comic strip tradition) (in The A1 True Life Bikini Confidential, February 1991)

Illustrations created for the Complete Bojeffries Saga TPB:

- "Under the Settee with Len" (introduction)
- "4-Dimensional Fenestration" (cut-out recreation of Grandfather Podlasp's garden)
- "Festus: Halloween Masque" (cut-out Halloween mask)
- "Ginda's Fabulous Fashions" (paper cut-out Ginda doll with attachable clothes)
- "Raoul's Recipe" (for "German Shepherd 's Pie")

=== Collected editions ===
Tundra Press published a collection, The Complete Bojeffries Saga (ISBN 1879450658), in 1992.

In February 2013, a new Bojeffries Saga collection was published jointly by Top Shelf Productions (US ISBN 978-1-60309-063-6) and Knockabout Comics (UK) collecting all previous material as well as a new 24-page story. Moore described the situation in a 2009 interview:

Yeah, I have written a final Bojeffries – well, I don't know if it's a final – but I've written a kind of, it wouldn't hurt if it was the last one, although maybe me and Steve will want to do some more with them. What we're going to do is, we're going to collect up, with Top Shelf, all of the Bojeffries material that's appeared to date, and we're going to cap it all off with a twenty-four-page story called "After They Were Famous", which is the Bojeffries in 2009, existing side-by-side with culture as it is now, as opposed to culture as it was in the eighties and the early nineties.

== Awards ==
- 1985 Eagle Award nomination for Favourite Group (UK)
- 1994 Eisner Award nomination for Best Graphic Album—Reprint for The Complete Bojeffries Saga
