= Steve Parkhouse =

British writer

- Areas: Writer, Artist, Letterer
- Pseudonym: Maxwell Stockbridge
- Notable works: Night Raven; Big Dave; Doctor Who; The Bojeffries Saga

Steve Parkhouse is a writer, artist and letterer who has worked for many British comics, especially 2000 AD and Doctor Who Magazine.

== Biography ==
Parkhouse has worked in comics since 1967, when he drew the occasional "Power House Pin-Up" of Marvel superheroes for the back covers of Fantastic and Terrific, two British weeklies published by Odhams. In 1969 his first professional writing assignments appeared when he co-wrote two Marvel Comics stories, one starring the jungle lord Ka-Zar in Marvel Super-Heroes No. 19 (March 1969), and the other starring the eponymous superspy in Nick Fury, Agent of S.H.I.E.L.D. No. 12 (May 1969). He also contributed a story for Western Gunfighters #4 (February 1970), pencilled by Barry Windsor-Smith

Since then he has worked on a wide range of titles from 2000 AD to Warrior and various Marvel UK titles. In 1982, Parkhouse wrote a comic book adaptation of the Time Bandits film which was drawn by David Lloyd and John Stokes.

His work includes "Big Dave" (with Mark Millar and Grant Morrison) in 2000 AD, The Bojeffries Saga with Alan Moore, Night Raven with David Lloyd and various strips in Doctor Who Magazine. He illustrated three Dr. Who episodes in 1982–83.

In 2004 he provided the art for Angel Fire, which was written by Chris Blythe (better known for his colouring work). This was published by Shattered Frames, a company they established in the same year to produce British graphic novels. In the same year he also drew writer Joe Casey's miniseries Milkman Murders, published by Dark Horse Comics. Since 2011, he has been working with Peter Hogan on the Dark Horse comic Resident Alien.

== Bibliography ==
- Night Raven (with David Lloyd, Marvel UK, 1979)
- Black Knight (with artists John Stokes and Paul Neary, in Hulk Weekly #1, 3–30, 42–55, 57–63, Marvel UK, 1979–1980)
- Doctor Who:
  - Fourth Doctor (collected in Dragon's Claw, Panini, 164 pages, 2005, ISBN 1-904159-81-8):
    - "The Deal" (with Dave Gibbons, in Doctor Who Magazine #53)
    - "End of the Line" (with Dave Gibbons, in Doctor Who Magazine #54–55)
    - "The Freefall Warriors" (with Dave Gibbons, in Doctor Who Magazine #56–57)
    - "Junkyard Demon" (with Mike McMahon/Adolfo Buylla, in Doctor Who Magazine #58–59)
    - "The Neutron Knights" (with Dave Gibbons, in Doctor Who Magazine #60)
  - Fifth Doctor (collected in The Tides of Time, Panini, 212 pages, 2005, ISBN 1-904159-92-3):
    - "Tides of Time" (with Dave Gibbons, in Doctor Who Magazine #61–67)
    - "Stars fell on Stockbridge" (with Dave Gibbons, in Doctor Who Magazine #68–69)
    - "The Stockbridge Horror" (with Mick Austin, in Doctor Who Magazine #70–75)
    - "Lunar Lagoon" (with Mick Austin, in Doctor Who Magazine #76–77)
    - "4-Dimensional Vistas" (with Mick Austin, in Doctor Who Magazine #78–83)
    - "The Moderator" (with Steve Dillon, in Doctor Who Magazine No. 84 and 86–87)
  - Sixth Doctor (with John Ridgway, collected in Doctor Who: Voyager, Marvel Comics, 100 pages, 1989, ISBN 1-85400-045-4):
    - "The Shape-Shifter" (in Doctor Who Magazine #88–89, 1984)
    - "Voyager" (in Doctor Who Magazine #90–94, 1984)
    - "Polly the Glot" (in Doctor Who Magazine #95–97, 1984)
    - "Once Upon a Time-Lord..." (in Doctor Who Magazine #98–99, 1984)
- The Bojeffries Saga (with Alan Moore, in Warrior No. 12, 13, 19 & 20, 1983–1984; Dalgoda No. 8, Fantagraphics Books, 1986; A1 #1–4, A1 True Life Bikini Confidential, Atomeka Press, 1989–1990; collected edition, Tundra, 1992, ISBN 1-879450-65-8)
- Moonrunners: "Moonrunners" (co-written with Alan McKenzie, with art Massimo Belardinelli, in 2000 AD #591–606, 1988)
- The Spiral Path (script and pencils, with inks by John Ridgway, Warrior #1–12, 1982–1983)
- Big Dave (written by Grant Morrison and Mark Millar):
  - "Target Baghdad" (in 2000 AD #842–845, 1993)
  - "Young Dave" (in 2000AD Yearbook 1994, 1993)
  - "Monarchy in the UK" (in 2000 AD #846–849, 1994)
  - "Wotta Lotta Balls" (in 2000 AD #904–907, 1994)
- The Journal of Luke Kirby (with Alan McKenzie):
  - "Sympathy for the Devil" (in 2000 AD #873–877 and #884–888, 1994)
  - "The Old Straight Track" (in 2000 AD #954–963, 1995)
- Sandman: The Dreaming: Beyond the Shores of Night (1999, ISBN 1-85286-904-6)
- Milkman Murders (with Joe Casey, 4-issue mini-series, Dark Horse Comics, 2004, tpb, 104 pages, 2005, ISBN 1-59307-080-2)
- Angel Fire (with Chris Blythe, graphic novel, Shattered Frames, 112 pages, April 2005, ISBN 0-9549944-0-X, Carlton Books, 192 pages, August 2007, ISBN 1-84442-918-0)
- Sex Pistols: The Graphic Novel (art, with writer Jim McCarthy, graphic novel, 96 pages, Omnibus Press, June 2008, ISBN 1-84609-508-5)
- Resident Alien (with Peter Hogan, Dark Horse Comics, April 2012 - Present)

== Awards ==
1994: Nominated for "Best Graphic Album—Reprint" Eisner Award for The Complete Bojeffries Saga
