= A1 (comics) =

Graphic novel anthology

- Cover of A1 vol. 1 (1989 Atomeka Press), art by Garry Leach.

Publication information
- Publisher: Atomeka Press (Vol. 1); Epic Comics (Vol. 2)
- Schedule: Irregular
Title(s)
Book 1
Book 2
Book 3
Book 4
Book 5
Book 6
- Formats: Ongoing graphic novel anthology
- Genre
- Publication date: October 1989 – April 1992
- Number of issues: 6 (Vol. 1); 4 (Vol. 2)
- Editor(s): Garry Leach; Dave Elliott

A1 is a graphic novel anthology series published by British company Atomeka Press. It was created in 1989 by Garry Leach and Dave Elliott. In 2004 it was restarted, publishing new and old material.

== Publication history ==
The first series (from the late 1980s) comprised six issues, plus the A1 Bikini Confidential. Page-count varied around the 64-128 range. Most stories were one-off showcases, sometimes featuring characters that had publishing history elsewhere (e.g. Concrete, Mr. Monster, Mr. X, the American, and Flaming Carrot). "Bricktop" was the one ongoing serialized story, though The Bojeffries Saga by Alan Moore and Steve Parkhouse appeared as self-contained stories in almost every issue. Issue #6 was numbered "6A" and a proposed "6B" never saw print, although most of the stories did see print in other publications, such as Heavy Metal magazine.

In 1992 a second series of A1 appeared under Marvel Comics's Epic Comics imprint, edited by Dave Elliott. These were four 48-page color books featuring work from Dave McKean, Kent Williams, Scott Hampton, George Pratt, P. Craig Russell, Glenn Fabry, Pedro Henry, and many others, including the late Martin Emond.

In 2004 Atomeka started publishing A1 again starting with A1 Big Issue Zero. It featured a Bojeffries Saga story that had originally appeared in two parts in Warrior with an introduction that was produced for the U.S. market to introduce the tone of the material. The new material for that issue was a strip by Steve Pugh called Shark-Man, which eventually had a three issue run in full colour in 2008 published by Image Comics.

== Titles ==
=== Volume 1 ===
==== Book 1 ====
ISBN 1-871878-05-5

- The Big Button, Barry Windsor-Smith
- Warpsmith: "Ghostdance", Alan Moore and Garry Leach
- Deadface: "The Fall of Angels and Other Misfits", Eddie Campbell and Phil Elliott
- Bad Bread, Graham Marks, and John Bolton
- The Ear of Seeing, excerpt from Goethe's Faust, illustrated by John Bolton
- Survivor, Dave Gibbons and Ted McKeever
- The Actress and the Bishop go Boating, Brian Bolland
- Wayfarer: "A Taste of Gold", Paul Behrer and Una Fricker
- Bojeffries: "Festus: Dawn of the Dead", Alan Moore and Steve Parkhouse
- Mr. X:
  - "Mr. X", Bill Sienkiewicz
  - "Heartsprings and Watchstops", Neil Gaiman and Dave McKean
  - "Prologue Epilogue", Dean Motter
- Libretto, Ted McKeever and Dave Gibbons
- The Return of the Purple Claw - Blazin' Glory No. 5, Oct 1942
- Blazin' Glory: "Ol' Glory, a Tribute", Paris Cullins and Dave Elliott
- Brick Top, Glenn Fabry
- Flaming Carrot: "The Bandit Moons", Bob Burden
- The Hollow Circus, Peter Milligan, Brendan McCarthy and Tom Frame
- Morelli-9: "Lobster Rumpus", Dom Regan

==== Book 2 ====
ISBN 1-871878-11-X

Side A

- Big Death, Peter Milligan and David Lloyd
- King Pant, Philip Bond and Jamie Hewlett
- Mr. X: "Windows", panels by Nick Abadzis, Mark Badger, Simon Bisley, Brian Bolland, Philip Bond, Bob Burden, Paul Chadwick, Brett Ewins, Mark Farmer, Dave Gibbons, Paul Grist, Jamie Hewlett, John Higgins, Michael Kaluta, David Lloyd, Ted McKeever, Mike Mignola, Kevin O'Neill, Paul Rivoche, William G. Simpson, Bryan Talbot, Charles Vess and Matt Wagner
- Bojeffries: "Sex with Ginda Bojeffries", Alan Moore and Steve Parkhouse
- This Really Happened!, Bambos
- A Death on the Beach, Phil Elliott
- Pressbutton: "A Long Time Dead", Steve Moore and Glenn Fabry
- Morelli-9: "Sperm Warfare", Dom Regan
- Elephant's Graveyard, Raymond Ward, Doug Braithwaite, and Rex Ward
- Empty Chairs, Graham Marks and John Bolton

Side B

- Mr. Monster, by Michael T. Gilbert and Dave Dorman
- Bricktop: "Firework Night", Glenn Fabry
- Jeepster, by Philip Bond
- Cowboys and Indians, by Al Davison
- Men and Hats, by Barry Windsor-Smith
- Kyrn, by Paul Behrer and Simon Bisley
- Obsessional, by Kevin McManus, Steve Moore and Shawn McManus
- Comics Are Really Grate, by Gary Pleece and Warren Pleece
- Fortean Times, by Steve Moore and Hunt Emerson
- The Talk of Creatures, by Ted McKeever
- Deadface: "About Hermes, Between You and Me", by Eddie Campbell

==== Book 3 ====
ISBN 1-871878-90-X

- The American, Mark Verheiden, Doug Braithwaite, and Chris Warner
- Deadface: "The Bookkeeper From Atlantis", Eddie Campbell
- The Actress and the Bishop throw a Party, Brian Bolland
- My Closest Friend, John Kaiine and Dave McKean
- Leone Ryder, Gary Pleece and Warren Pleece
- Bricktop: "Walton Pig Girls", Chris Smith and Glenn Fabry
- Endless Summer, Philip Bond
- The House of Hearts Desire, Grant Morrison and Dom Regan
- Point of View, Graham Marks and John Bolton
- Bojeffries: "A Quiet Christmas With the Family", Alan Moore and Steve Parkhouse
- Monsieur Mouche: "Lighter than Air", Jean-Luc Coudray and Moebius

==== Book 4 ====
ISBN 1-871878-56-X

- Grendel: "Devil's Whisper", James Robinson and D'Israeli
- Hellcity, Alan Martin and Jamie Hewlett
- The Funeral, Andrew Strickland and Richard Barker
- Bricktop: "Balls", Chris Smith and Glenn Fabry
- The Moebius Portfolio (translated by Jean-Marc Lofficier & Randy Lofficier)
  - In The Heart of the Impregnable Meta-bunker, Alejandro Jodorowsky and Moebius
  - Carnet 3: the Moebius Sketchbook
  - Moebius circa '74
- The Last Party on Earth, Jean-Marc Lofficier and Steve Whitaker
- The Day the General Came, James Robinson and Phil Elliott
- Emily, Almost, Bill Sienkiewicz
- Dalgoda: "The Hero of the Tale", Jan Strnad and James Nowlan
- A Lot on his Plate, Graham Marks and John Bolton
- Bojeffries: "Song of the Terraces", Alan Moore and Steve Parkhouse

==== Book 5 ====
ISBN 1-871878-39-X

- Cover Story, Neil Gaiman and Kelley Jones
- Bricktop: "Sunglasses", Chris Smith and Glenn Fabry
- In the Penal Colony, Peter Milligan and Brett Ewins (adapted from Franz Kafka)
- The Contact, Brett Ewins and Shaky Kane
- Tor: "Food Chain", Joe Kubert
- Jeff Hawke: "The Devil at Rennes-le-Chateau", Sydney Jordan, Trevor Goring and Thayed Rich
- Knuckles the Malevolent Nun, Cornelius Stone and Roger Langridge
- Bic: "Party Piece", Ed Hillyer
- Reasons, Jeff Jones
- The Boy Who Defied Gravity, Nick Abadzis
- Take One Capsule Every Million Years, Bruce Jones, Jim Sullivan, and William Stout
- Elvistein: "Yin and Yankee", Bambos Georgiu
- The Proxy, Ramsey Campbell and David Lloyd
- Trypto the Acid-Dog: "Pet Sounds", Miguel Ferrer, Bill Mumy, Steve Leialoha
- Kathleen's House, Steve Dillon

==== Book 6 ====
ISBN 1-871878-80-X

- Tank Girl: "She's Fucking Great", Jamie Hewlett
- Rescue, Archie Goodwin and D'Israeli
- The Competition, Hilary Barta and Doug Rice
- The Happy Angel of Death, Martin Hand
- 'Harlequin Bones: Dada 331, Warren Ellis and Phil Winslade
- 'Paris is a Ball, Serge Clerc
- Alec MacGarry: "Obsession", Eddie Campbell
- And They Never Get Drunk But Stay Sober, Garth Ennis and Steve Dillon

==== Special ====
ISBN 1-871878-69-1

- Mr. Monster's Most Wanted!, Michael T. Gilbert
- Parcels of Events, Brian Bolland
- Zirk: "Siren of the Stars", Steve Moore and Brian Bolland
- Hell City II, Alan Martin and Jamie Hewlett
- Jaremsheela:
  - "Chapter I", Steve Moore and David Jackson
  - "Chapter II", Steve Moore and David Jackson
  - "Chapter III", Steve Moore, Doug Braithwaite and Dave Elliott
- Tales of the Taco Fiend, Bob Burden
- Click, Melinda Gebbie and Carol Swain
- The Betty Page Portfolio
- Better than a Poke in the Eye with a Sharp Stick, Dave Elliott and Will Simpson
- The Temple of Sweat, Peter Milligan and John Higgins
- Bojeffries: "Our Factory Fortnight", Alan Moore and Steve Parkhouse
- Zirk: "The Perils of Polizei", Steve Moore and Garry Leach

=== Volume 2 ===
==== Book 1 ====
ISBN 0-87135-949-9

- Along for the Ride, Igor Goldkind and Glenn Fabry
- Cyrano de Bergerac's Voyage to the Moon, P. Craig Russell
- Goofing, Scott Hampton
- Fanciable Headcase, Ed Hillyer
- Frankenstein Meets Shirley Temple (Part One), Roger Langridge
- Wonderful Life, Steve White

==== Book 2 ====
ISBN 0-87135-950-2

- Max Zillion and Alter Ego: "Pawnshop", Hunt Emerson
- Deadline, George Pratt
- Cheeky Wee Budgie Boy: "The Castafiore Affair", Philip Bond and Jon Beeston
- Saccharine Fools, Nick Abadzis
- King Leon (Part One), Peter Milligan and Jamie Hewlett
- Frankenstein Meets Shirley Temple (Part Two), Roger Langridge
- Wonderful Life, Steve White

==== Book 3 ====
ISBN 0-87135-951-0

- Axel Pressbutton: "The Movie", by Steve Moore and Martin Emond
- Pale Horses, Dan Abnett, Steve White and Gary Erskine
- Stripey: "Social Victim Fashion Frenzy", Roddy MacNeil and Colin MacNeil
- King Leon (Part Two), Peter Milligan and Jamie Hewlett
- Frankenstein Meets Shirley Temple (Part Three), Roger Langridge
- Wonderful Life, Una Fricker

==== Book 4 ====
ISBN 0-87135-952-9

- King Leon (Part Three), Peter Milligan and Jamie Hewlett
- The Edge, Dave Dorman
- Uptown Ruler, Dave McKean
- Frankenstein Meets Shirley Temple (Part Four), Roger Langridge
- Wonderful Life, Una Fricker

== Awards ==
- 1990: Won "Best Anthology" Harvey Award
- 1992: Nominated for "Best Anthology" Eisner Award for A1 #5
