= Blast! (comics) =

1991 British comics magazine

- The cover of Blast! #1 (June 1991). Art by Simon Bisley.
- Editor: Stuart Green
- Staff writers: Fiona Jerome, Dave Elliot
- Categories: comics, criticism, interviews
- Frequency: monthly
- Publisher: John Brown Publishing
- First issue: June 1991
- Final issue Number: November 1991; 7
- Country: United Kingdom
- Based in: London
- Language: English

Blast! was a British comics magazine published by John Brown Publishing that ran monthly for seven issues from June to November 1991. Blast! featured comics by British, European, and American contributors. It was edited by Stuart Green, with Fiona Jerome and Dave Elliot.

Recurring strips in Blast! included Warren Ellis & D'Israeli's Lazarus Churchyard, Marya Muerta & Yan Shimony's Big Berta, Glenn Dakin's War, an English translation of Enrique Sánchez Abulí & Jordi Bernet's Torpedo 1936, and reprints of Paul Chadwick's Concrete and Michael T. Gilbert's Mr. Monster. Blast! featured some of the earliest published work by such notable creators as Warren Ellis and Gordon Rennie.

The first five issues included a 16-page insert of Speakeasy, the remnants of the long-running comics news & reviews magazine. The final two issues featured articles and reviews alongside the comic strips.

Each issue ran 64 pages with a color cover, black-and-white interior pages, and was labeled for mature readers.

== Issues ==
Issue no.	Cover artist	Contributors	Strips	Notes
1	Simon Bisley	Warren Ellis, Pedro Henry, Simon Bisley, Steve Dillon, Peter Bagge, Paul Chadwick, Michael T. Gilbert, D'Israeli, Enrique Sánchez Abulí, Jordi Bernet	Lazarus Churchyard, Axel Pressbutton, the translated Spanish comic Torpedo 1936 by Abulí and Bernet, reprints of Gilbert's Mr. Monster and Chadwick's Concrete	First appearance of Ellis and D'Israeli's Lazarus Churchyard.
2	Simon Bisley	Warren Ellis, Glenn Dakin, Yan Shimony, Marya Muerta, Peter Bagge, Paul Chadwick, Michael T. Gilbert, D'Israeli, Enrique Sánchez Abulí, Jordi Bernet	Lazarus Churchyard in The Virtual Kiss, Torpedo 1936, War, reprints of Mr. Monster and Concrete	
3	D'Israeli	Warren Ellis, Charles Burns, Glenn Dakin, Yan Shimony, Peter Bagge, Paul Chadwick, Michael T. Gilbert, D'Israeli, William Messner-Loebs	Lazarus Churchyard, War, Big Berta, reprints of Mr. Monster and Concrete, plus Burns' Dog Boy	
4	D'Israeli	Warren Ellis, Glenn Dakin, Paul Chadwick, Michael T. Gilbert, D'Israeli	Lazarus Churchyard, War, reprints of Mr. Monster and Concrete	Concrete poster
5	Charles Burns	Warren Ellis, William Messner-Loebs, Enrique Sánchez Abulí, Yan Shimony, Paul Chadwick, Michael T. Gilbert, D'Israeli, Jordi Bernet	Lazarus Churchyard, Big Berta, Torpedo 1936, reprints of Mr. Monster and Concrete	
6	D'Israeli	Warren Ellis, Peter Bagge, Enrique Sánchez Abulí, Yan Shimony, Marya Muerta, Colin De Suinn, Paul Chadwick, Stan Nichols, David Hine, D'Israeli, Jordi Bernet	Lazarus Churchyard, Big Berta, Torpedo 1936, Curse of the Transvestite, reprints of Bagge's Junior and Chadwick's Concrete	
7	Martin Emond	Warren Ellis, Peter Bagge, Gordon Rennie, Martin Emond, Woodrow Phoenix, Yan Shimony, Marya Muerta, Paul Chadwick, D'Israeli, Nick Abadzis, John Buckle, Shaky Kane	Lazarus Churchyard, Big Berta, Martin Spoade, reprints of Bagge's The Bradleys and Chadwick's Concrete, the debut of Rennie and Emond's White Trash, and Sherlock Holmes in the Curious Case of the Vanishing Villain	Final issue of the series; White Trash and Lazarus Churchyard continue in their own series, both released by Tundra Publishing.

== See also ==
- Crisis
- Deadline
- Revolver
