= Axel Pressbutton =

Comics character

- Axel Pressbutton #6 (Eclipse Comics, July 1985), cover art by Mick Austin.

Publication information
- Publisher: Dark Star; Spotlight Publications; Quality Communications; Eclipse Comics; Atomeka Press; John Brown Publishing; Marvel Epic
- First appearance: Dark Star #22 (1979)
- Created by: Pedro Henry (Steve Moore); Curt Vile (Alan Moore)

In-story information
- Species: Cyborg
- Partnerships: Mysta Mistralis (Laser Eraser)
Axel Pressbutton
Publication information
- Publisher: Eclipse Comics
- Format: Limited series
- Genre: Science fiction
- Publication date: Axel Pressbutton: November 1984 – July 1985; Laser Eraser and Pressbutton: November 1985 – July 1986
- No. of issues: 6 (Axel Pressbutton); 6 (Laser Eraser and Pressbutton)
Creative team
- Written by: Steve Moore
- Artist: Mike Collins

Axel Pressbutton is a fictional character appearing in comic books. A violent cyborg with the face of Ernest Borgnine, a button on his chest which delivers orgasmic pleasure when pressed, and a phobia about vegetation, he was created by Steve Moore (under the pseudonym "Pedro Henry") and Alan Moore (no relation to Steve Moore), under the pseudonym "Curt Vile".

== Publication history ==
=== Dark Star and Sounds ===
Axel first appeared in the strip "Three-Eyes McGurk and his Death Planet Commandos", serialized in four issues of the British rock music magazine Dark Star in 1979–1980. Further Axel stories appeared in Sounds in the period 1980–1983; these were mostly written and drawn by "Curt Vile" (Alan Moore). From that period onward, all Axel stories were written by "Pedro Henry" (Steve Moore).

=== Warrior ===
Steve Moore worked with editor Dez Skinn at Marvel UK, and when Skinn set up his own title Warrior he asked the writer to join the project. Steve Moore struck on a revival of Axel Pressbutton for one of his contributions to the anthology. Skinn requested a female co-lead be added to the strip, leading to the creation of Mysta Mistralis a futuristic hit woman or "Laser Eraser". As Alan Moore had decided to focus on writing, Steve Dillon came onboard as artist. Some stories featured the bizarre supporting character Zirk, drawn by such artists as Garry Leach and Brian Bolland. Zirk won the 1983 Eagle Award for Favourite Supporting Character. Laser Eraser and Pressbutton was featured on the cover of the magazine's debut issue, and the fourth issue (also known as the Warrior Summer Special) was detailed Axel's origin in a standalone story with art from David Jackson. Steve Moore continued to use his Pedro Henry pseudonym when writing the strip, despite others in the magazine coming out under his real name; that Moore and Henry were one and the same was something of an open secret within British comics fandom. The strip, however, hit trouble when Dillon "disappeared", leading to a reprint of material from Sounds. Alan Davis instead took over as artist, but only three more episodes followed before Warrior ended in January 1985.

=== Eclipse Comics ===
Before Warrior had ended the character had already made his debut in American comics. Skinn had initially struck a deal with Pacific Comics to print Warrior material, but the company went bankrupt before any was published; the deal was taken over by Eclipse Comics. They repackaged the Warrior strips, along with other material from the magazine such as Zirk, Warpsmith and Ektryn, as a bi-monthly 6-issue colour mini-series called Axel Pressbutton, from November 1984 to July 1985. Eclipse's promotion for the series linked it firmly to the British Invasion, and claimed the first issue had "sold out". The title received positive reviews.

Eclipse then continued the series with new material written by "Henry", also offering a free subscription to anyone who correctly guessed the writer's identity. While initially the company planned to continue the Axel Pressbutton series, it was instead published as a new series, now named Laser Eraser and Pressbutton. Dillon returned to draw the first issue, while David Lloyd and Jerry Paris also contributed before Mike Collins took over as regular artist. The book was initially announced as a 12-issue maxi-series, and part of Eclipse's short-lived 75¢ line, with Moore's Twilight World as a back-up. Eclipse also produced the one-shot 3-D Laser Eraser and Pressbutton, featuring black-and-white stories treated in stereoscopy by Ray Zone.

From #5, the price increased to 95¢, and the comic was cancelled after 6 issues. Axel and Mysta then appeared in back-up stories in Miracleman #9–12.

=== Revivals ===
Moore retained copyright to the characters, and later one-off stories appeared in anthology publications such as A1 and Blast!, always written by "Henry". In 2006, artist Jon Haward announced a new story featuring Laser Eraser and Pressbutton. Written by Moore, the story was planned to go online on Haward's website in October 2006, but Steve Moore died in 2014 and the story remains unpublished.

== Character biography ==
Pressbutton's origin was given in a stand-alone story in the Warrior Summer Special (Quality Communications, 1983), drawn by David Jackson. Originally a mild-mannered and plant-loving florist, he took delivery of plant matter which included a sentient, telepathic, anesthetic, carnivorous fungus which attacked his body from the feet upwards. All the time it was consuming him, it was empathising with him, apologising for eating him and preventing him from feeling the pain. By the time he was rescued, the only remaining parts of his body were his head, right arm and part of his chest. As a result of this damage, he became extremely embittered, especially against vegetation. When rebuilt as Pressbutton, he was fitted with a cleaver as a left arm and, because of his lack of genital equipment, an orgasm-inducing button on his chest clearly marked "Press". This was sometimes used by later adversaries to disable him (in rapture) while he was attacking them.

== Bibliography ==
- "Three-Eyes McGurk and his Death Planet Commandos", serialized in Dark Star #22–25 (1979–1980) – by Pedro Henry and Curt Vile; later reprinted in Rip Off Comix #8 (April 1981)
- "The Stars My Degradation" (a reference to The Stars My Destination), serialized in Sounds (12 July 1980 – 19 March 1983) – Vile wrote and drew the strip from 12 July 1980, to December 1981, and then again from 5 February 1983, to 19 March 1983; Henry wrote the strip from 6 February 1982, to 15 January 1983; all art by Vile
- "Christmas on Depravity", Sounds (8-page story, 26 December 1981) – story by Pedro Henry and Curt Vile, art by Curt Vile; later reprinted in Warrior #16 (Dec. 1983).
- "The Bride of Pressbutton", Sounds (8-page story, 25 December 1982) – by Pedro Henry and Curt Vile
- Laser Eraser and Pressbutton, in Warrior issues #1–12, 14 (text piece only), 15, 16 (reprint from Sounds), 21, 24–25 (Quality Communications, March 1982–August 1984) – stories by Pedro Henry, art by Steve Dillon (issues #1–3, 6–11), David Jackson (issues #4 and 5), Mick Austin (issue #12), and Alan Davis (issues #21, 24–25)
- Axel Pressbutton (Eclipse Comics, Nov. 1984–July 1985) – by Pedro Henry and Steve Dillon, David Jackson, and Alan Davis; reprints from Warrior
- Laser Eraser and Pressbutton (Eclipse Comics, November 1985 –July 1986) – by Pedro Henry and Mike Collins
- 3-D Laser Eraser and Pressbutton (Eclipse Comics, August 1986)) – by Pedro Henry and Mike Collins
- "Corsairs of Illunium", in Miracleman #9 (Eclipse Comics, July 1986) – by Pedro Henry and Mike Collins
- "Corsairs of Illunium part 2", in Miracleman #10 (Eclipse, Comics, December 1986) – by Pedro Henry and Mike Collins
- "Time after Time", in Miracleman #11 (Eclipse Comics, May 1987) – by Pedro Henry and Mike Collins
- "Time after Time", in Miracleman #12 (Eclipse Comics, September 1987) – by Pedro Henry and Mike Collins
- "A Long Time Dead", in A1 Volume 1 Book #2 (Atomeka Press, 1989) – six-page text story by Pedro Henry, art by Glenn Fabry
- "Famous for Fifteen Minutes", in Blast! #1 (John Brown Publishing, June 1991) – six-page story by Pedro Henry, art by Steve Dillon
- "Axel Pressbutton – The Movie", in A1 Volume 2 Book #3 (Marvel Epic, 1992) – seven pages & cover, story by Pedro Henry, art by Martin Emond & poster page/cover by Simon Bisley
