= Steve Moore (comics) =

British comics writer (1949–2014)

- Born: 11 June 1949 Shooter's Hill, London, England
- Died: 16 March 2014 (aged 64) Shooter's Hill, London, England
- Area: Writer
- Pseudonym: Pedro Henry
- Notable works: Axel Pressbutton; Future Shocks; Tom Strong's Terrific Tales

Steve Moore (11 June 1949 – 16 March 2014) was a British comics writer.

Moore was credited with showing writer Alan Moore (no relation), then a struggling cartoonist, how to write comic scripts. His career has subsequently been quite closely linked with the more famous Moore – the pair collaborated under pseudonyms (Steve's pseudonym was "Pedro Henry", Alan's was "Curt Vile") on strips for Sounds, including one which introduced the character Axel Pressbutton, who was later to feature in the Warrior anthology comic, as well as a standalone series published by Eclipse Comics.

== Biography ==
Moore has long been linked to Alan Moore, who has known him "since he [Alan] was fourteen" referring to him as "a friend... fellow comic writer [and] a fellow occultist". The two have so often been linked together that Alan joked that Steve would have 'no relation' engraved on his tombstone.

Moore was an editor of Bob Rickard's long-running UK-based "Journal of the Unexplained" Fortean Times. In later years, he also edited that publication's more academic sister-publication Fortean Studies. He is listed as a 'specialist contributor' to the Chambers Dictionary of the Unexplained, which also notes that he compiled the Fortean Times' General Index, and several derivative books. He was a freelance writer on diverse topics, and said he "lives in London [where he] interests himself mainly in ancient and oriental subjects".

=== UK comics work ===
Steve Moore began working for Odhams Press' comics division while still in his teens, and in 1971 he created the UK's first comics fanzine, Orpheus. Moore's comics work has featured in most of the major British comics, particularly in anthologies. He was involved with 2000 AD from its earliest days, writing the second story-arc of their Dan Dare-revival "Hollow World" (Progs 12–23), and devising the Future Shocks format for Prog #25 with his "King of the World".

Later work for 2000 AD includes "Red Fang" (with artist Steve Yeowell), "Valkyries" (with American artist John Lucas) and a series of one-off short fantasy stories collected under the name Tales of Telguuth (with multiple artists).

He wrote the earliest back-up stories, focusing on supporting characters or aliens, for Doctor Who Weekly (later Doctor Who Magazine), before also taking over the main strip featuring the Doctor from issue #35, co-creating the character Abslom Daak (with artist Steve Dillon) for the publication. Many stories were reprinted by Marvel and Marvel UK, including as back-up features to Jamie Delano's Captain Britain in The Daredevils. Also for Marvel UK he wrote Hulk and Nick Fury, Agent of S.H.I.E.L.D. stories in Hulk Comic.

He also wrote several stories in Warrior, including, as Pedro Henry, a revival of his Axel Pressbutton character from Sounds.

He was featured in the anthology A1 (including a strip with fellow-Fortean Hunt Emerson on Fortean Times in #2).

=== Alan Moore-related work ===
He wrote "Young Tom Strong" and created the character Jonni Future for Tom Strong's Terrific Tales, a 12 issue anthology series from Alan Moore's America's Best Comics line.

He wrote the novelisation of the film V for Vendetta, based on the comics of the same name, by Alan Moore and David Lloyd.

In 2006 Alan Moore released a biographical essay on Moore called Unearthing, which in 2010 became an audiobook.

At the time of his death, he was co-writing The Moon and Serpent Bumper Book of Magic with Alan Moore, which was published on October 15, 2024, by Top Shelf.

=== Asian themes ===
Steve Moore had an abiding, and scholarly, interest in the history and mythology of China. Somehow, in the early 1980s this came to the attention of Bob Guccione who commissioned a three-part series on Brothels of the Orient for his soft-porn magazine Penthouse. Steve objected that he had never even been to the Far East, let alone resorted to its brothels. Guccione's advice was to 'just make it up.' While Moore found the subject matter distasteful, he was promised a very substantial fee. Consequently, Moore accepted the commission on condition that it be published under the pseudonym "Pedro Henry". This name was an amalgam of Pedro McGregor (author of Brazilian Magic, a book which he was reading at the time) and O. Henry, the short-story writer. The articles appeared under Moore's own name, causing him no little embarrassment. He claimed that his subsequent use of the 'Pedro Henry' pseudonym was an attempt to distance himself from Steve Moore the lascivious denizen of oriental houses of ill-repute.

Moore was also a dedicated student and practitioner of the I Ching and consulted it every morning, without fail, from 1969 onwards, recording the results in his 'I Ching diary'. In 1988, he published "The Trigrams of Han: Inner Structures of the I Ching". This scholarly work led Moore to be inducted into the Royal Asiatic Society as a Fellow.

From 1995 until its final issue in 2002, Moore edited The Oracle, The Journal of Yijing Studies.

He was a co-author of I Ching: An Annotated Bibliography, published in 2002.

=== Other ===
He scripted Marvel Comics' adaptation of the James Bond film Octopussy, published in Marvel Comics Super Special #26 (1983).

His work has also been published by Eclipse Comics in the US, much of it reprinted from Warrior. He wrote most of the stories for John Bolton's Halls of Horror, as well as Axel Pressbutton and Laser Eraser and Pressbutton.

Alan Moore wrote a long biographical essay about Steve Moore, entitled "Unearthing" and included in the Iain Sinclair-edited anthology London: City of Disappearances. In early 2008, it was reported that this essay was being adapted into a "photo-illustrated hardcover novel, with some fumetti elements and visuals by Mitch Jenkins," to be published by Top Shelf Comics.

Later work includes Hercules: The Thracian Wars at Radical Comics which was adapted for cinema by Brett Ratner in 2014. He followed that with Hercules: The Knives of Kush, a 5-issue limited series set in Egypt. At the time, Moore said this was his final comics work for now, although he was still writing in other areas:

for the last couple of years I had to care for a disabled relative [his older brother, Chris, who suffered from ALS], which meant that I had little time for any other work than Hercules. As he's recently passed away, I now find myself in a position where I can retire from writing mainstream comics, so once I've seen Knives of Kush through the press, I'll be gone. [...] As far as comics are concerned, I'm hanging up my hat and turning to non-fiction. A couple of short pieces for Fortean Times, hopefully dusting off my research for a book on Selene, maybe some more stuff on the Yijing.

In October 2011, Moore released a novel, Somnium: A Fantastic Romance, published by nthposition press. The story follows a young man who is trying to write a book based on the legendary romance of Endymion and the moon goddess Selene. It is thus, in part, self-referential as Steve was writer who worshiped Selene and who saw himself in the role of Endymion, her mortal lover. The parallels are limited though, as he did not, for instance, have a sister. The book is set in a real inn, called The Bull, at the summit of Shooters Hill. It was Steve's "local", being within five-minute's walk of his home. The story is remarkably static as it happens entirely within the confines of this inn but includes excursions into the 16th, 18th, and 19th century episodes (also occurring in The Bull) which reflect the obsessions of the central character.

== In popular culture ==
Moore was portrayed, as himself, in Albion #1 (WildStorm, Aug. 2005); the six-issue limited series aimed to revive classic IPC-owned British comics characters, all of whom appeared in comics published by Odhams Press and later IPC Media during the 1960s and early 1970s, such as Smash!, Valiant, and Lion. In the comic, the fictional Moore admits to having signed the so-called "Official Secrets Act," which ensured that the fact that IPC characters were actually real would be kept secret from the public. Albion was plotted by Alan Moore, written by his daughter Leah Moore and her husband John Reppion, with art by Shane Oakley and George Freeman.

== Bibliography ==
=== Comics ===
==== 2000 AD ====
Work for 2000 AD include:

- Dan Dare: "Hollow World" (with Massimo Belardinelli, in 2000 AD #12–23, 1977)
- Tharg's Future Shocks:
  - "King of the World" (with Blasquez, in 2000 AD #25, 1977)
  - "Food for Thought" (with Horacio Lalia, in 2000 AD #26, 1977)
  - "The Runts" (with Pat Wright, in 2000 AD #41, 1977)
  - "Fly Guy" (with Jose Luis Ferrer, in 2000 AD #49, 1978)
  - "Brain Drain" (with Ron Tiner, in 2000 AD #95, 1979)
  - "Fish in a Barrel" (with Eric Bradbury, in 2000 AD #208, 1981)
  - "Slashman, Kowalski and Rat" (with Mike White, in 2000 AD #213, 1981)
  - "New Cruise Blues" (with Steve Kyte, in 2000 AD #218, 1981)
  - "Hen-pecked Henry" (with Jose Casanovas, in 2000 AD #220, 1981)
  - "The Red House" (with Jesus Redondo, in 2000 AD #231, 1981)
  - "Once Upon an Atom" (with Alan Langford, in 2000 AD #235, 1981)
  - "A Little Problem" (with Johnny Johnstone, in 2000 AD #237, 1981)
  - "The Masks of Arazzor" (with Jose Casanovas, in 2000 AD #241, 1981)
  - "The Last Supper" (with Frazer Irving, in 2000 AD #1205, 2000)
  - "Dwellers in the Depths" (with Wayne Reynolds, in 2000 AD #1206, 2000)
  - "Home from the War" (with Boo Cook, in 2000 AD #1208, 2000)
  - "Skeleton Crew" (with Frazer Irving, in 2000 AD #1209, 2000)
  - "The World Next Door" (with Andrew Chiu, in 2000 AD #1210, 2000)
  - "Escape Ship" (with Dylan Teague, in 2000 AD #1211, 2000)
  - "War Games" (with Graham Higgins, in 2000 AD #1265, 2001)
  - "Skin Game" (with Boo Cook, in 2000 AD #1268, 2001)
  - "Decontamination Procedure" (with Anthony Williams, in 2000 AD #1269, 2001)
  - "Property Rights" (with John Charles, in 2000 AD #1272, 2001)
  - "Marooned" (with Shaun Bryan, in 2000 AD #1278, 2002)
  - "Warped" (with pencils by Ben McCloud and inks by Cliff Robinson, in 2000 AD #1295, 2002)
  - "Black Jack's Revenge" (with pencils by Ben McCloud and inks by Cliff Robinson, in 2000 AD #1457, 2005)
- Judge Dredd: "Whitey's Brother" (with Mike McMahon, in 2000 AD Annual 1978, 1977)
- Rick Random: "Riddle of the Astral Assassin" (with Ron Turner (1–5) and Carlos Ezquerra (6), in 2000 AD #113–118, 1979)
- Agent Rat (with Alan Langford, in 2000 AD #273–274, 1982)
- Tales of Telguuth:
  - "A Little Knowledge" (with Greg Staples, in 2000 AD #1191, 2000)
  - "Talking Heads" (with Paul Johnson, in 2000 AD #1192, 2000)
  - "Music of the Spheres" (with Siku, in 2000 AD #1193, 2000)
  - "The Eternal Bliss of Zebba Horath" (with Simon Davis, in 2000 AD #1194, 2000)
  - "To Become a God" (with Paul Johnson, in 2000 AD #1195, 2000)
  - "The Bride of Ballakruz-Krim" (with Dean Ormston, in 2000 AD #1196, 2000)
  - "Men of Snakewood" (with Siku, in 2000 AD #1197, 2000)
  - "Uhuros the Horrendous" (with Carl Critchlow, in 2000 AD #1198, 2000)
  - "The Conqueror Wummb" (with Paul Johnson, in 2000 AD #1199, 2000)
  - "The Transfiguration of Tesro Karnik" (with Siku, in 2000 AD #1227–1229, 2001)
  - "The Oscillations of Taramasellion" (with Siku, in 2000 AD #1235–1236, 2001)
  - "The Caverns of Garnek-Spay" (with Carl Critchlow, in 2000 AD #1240–1242, 2001)
  - "The Hunting of the Veks" (with Siku, in 2000 AD #1249, 2001)
  - "The Vileness of Scromyx" (with Siku, in 2000 AD #1258–1260, 2001)
  - "The Infinite Return of Varkor Gan" (with Siku, in 2000 AD # 1263, 2001)
  - "The Atrocities of Pagafruuz Jeel" (with Siku, in 2000 AD #1283, 2002)
  - "The Colossal Wealth of Karn Foul-Eye" (with Stefano Cardoselli, in 2000 AD #1284, 2002)
  - "The Wheels of Fortune" (with Jon Haward/John Stokes, in 2000 AD #1285–1286, 2002)
  - "The Rousing of Rezik" (with Jon Haward, in 2000 AD #1287–1288, 2002)
  - "The Black Arts of Skrixlan Nort" (with Jon Haward, in 2000 AD #1329, 2003)
  - "Pagrok the Infallible" (with Jon Haward, in 2000 AD #1330–31, 2003)
  - "One Cold Winter Night…" (with Jon Haward, in 2000 AD #1332, 20030)
  - "The Iniquities of Snedron" (with Jon Haward, in 2000 AD #1333–1334, 2003)
  - "Holding the Fort" (with Jon Haward/John Stokes, in 2000 AD #1369, 2003)
  - "The Eternal Life of Emperor Ygg" (with Dave Kendall, in 2000 AD #1370, 2003)
- Red Fang (in 2000 AD #1200–1211, 2000)
- Killer (with pencils by Staz Johnson and inks by David Roach, in 2000 AD #1264–1272, 2001)
- Tharg's Terror Tales:
  - "Murdermind" (with Roger Mason, in 2000 AD #1311, 2002)
  - "Frozen Stiffs" (with Phil Winslade, in 2000 AD #1374, 2004)
  - "Ashes to Ashes" (with Andrew Currie, in 2000 AD #1458, 2005)
- Past Imperfect: "Otherworld" (with Cam Smith, in 2000 AD #1346–1349, 2003)
- Valkyries (with John Lucas, in 2000 AD #1377–1382, 2004)

==== Marvel UK ====
- Hulk (with Dave Gibbons and Paul Neary, in Hulk Comic #1–6, 9–20, 26–27, 1979)
- Nick Fury, Agent of S.H.I.E.L.D. (with Steve Dillon, in Hulk Comic #1–19, 1979)
- Doctor Who:
  - "The Return of the Daleks" (with pencils by Paul Neary and inks by David Lloyd, in Doctor Who Weekly #1–4, 1979)
  - "Throwback: The Soul of a Cyberman" (with Steve Dillon, in "Doctor Who Weekly" #5–7, 1979)
  - "The Final Quest" (with Paul Neary, in Doctor Who Weekly #8, 1979)
  - "The Stolen TARDIS – a tale of Time Lords" (with Steve Dillon, in Doctor Who Weekly #9–11, 1979)
  - "K-9's Finest Hour" (with Paul Neary, in Doctor Who Weekly #12, 1980)
  - "Warlord of the Ogrons" (with Steve Dillon, in Doctor Who Weekly #13–14, 1980)
  - "Deathworld" (with David Lloyd, in Doctor Who Weekly #15–16, 1980)
  - Abslom Daak (96 pages, Marvel Comics, ISBN 1-85400-113-2)
    - "Abslom Daak—Dalek Killer" (with Steve Dillon, in Doctor Who Weekly #17–20, 1980)
    - "Star Tigers" (with Steve Dillon, in Doctor Who Weekly #27–30, 1980)
    - "Star Tigers, Part Two" (with David Lloyd, in Doctor Who Weekly #44–46, 1980)
  - "Twilight of the Silurians" (with David Lloyd, in Doctor Who Weekly #21–22, 1980)
  - "The Ship of Fools" (with Steve Dillon, in Doctor Who Weekly #23–24, 1980)
  - "The Outsider" (with Steve Dillon, in Doctor Who Weekly #25–26, 1980)
  - "Yonder . . . the Yeti" (with David Lloyd, in Doctor Who Weekly #31–34, 1980)
  - "The Time Witch" (with Dave Gibbons, in Doctor Who Weekly #35–38, 1980, collected in The Iron Legion, 164 pages, 2004, ISBN 1-904159-37-0)
  - Dragon's Claw (with Dave Gibbons, 164 pages, 2005, ISBN 1-904159-81-8) includes:
    - "Dragon's Claw" (in Doctor Who Weekly/Doctor Who Monthly #39–45, 1980)
    - "The Collector" (in Doctor Who Monthly #46, 9180)
    - "Dreamers of Death" (in Doctor Who Monthly #47–48, 1980–1981)
    - "The Life Bringer" (in Doctor Who Monthly #49–50, 1981)
    - "The War of Words" (in Doctor Who Monthly #51, 1981)
    - "Crisis on Kaldor" (in Doctor Who Monthly #51, 1981)
    - "Spider-God" (in Doctor Who Monthly #52, 1981)
- Star Wars:
  - "Death Masque!" (in Empire Strikes Back Monthly #149, 1981, collected in Star Wars Omnibus: Wild Space, Volume 1; Dark Horse Comics, 2013)
  - "Dark Knight's Devilry" (in Empire Strikes Back Monthly #152]], 1982, collected in Star Wars Omnibus: Wild Space, Volume 1; Dark Horse comics, 2013)

==== Warrior ====
- Laser Eraser & Pressbutton (as Pedro Henry, with Steve Dillon, in Warrior #1–10, 12 & 15–16, 1982–1983)
- Father Shandor, Demon Stalker (with John Bolton, David Jackson and John Stokes, in Warrior #1–10 & 13–16, 25 1982–1983, 1984)
- Zirk (in Warrior #3, 1982)
- The Legend of Prester John (in Warrior #1,#11 and #12, 1983)
- Zirk (with Brian Bolland and Garry Leach, in Warrior #13, 1983)
- Ektryn (with Cam Kennedy, in Warrior #14, 25, 1983, 1984)
- Twilight World (with Jim Baikie, in Warrior #14–17, 1983–84)
- Jaramsheela (in Warrior #17, 1984)

==== Other ====
- Laser Eraser & Pressbutton (in Sounds, and later from Eclipse Comics)
- Young Tom Strong (in Tom Strong's Terrific Tales #1–12)
- Jonni Future (in Tom Strong's Terrific Tales #1–12 and Tomorrow Stories Special #2)
- Johnny Future (in Tomorrow Stories Special #1)
- Little Margie in Misty Magic Land (in Tomorrow Stories Special #2)
- ABC A–Z: Greyshirt & Cobweb
- ABC A–Z: Top 10 & Teams
- Hercules: Volume 1: The Thracian War (with Admira Wijaya, 5-issue limited series, Radical Comics, 2008, tpb, December 2008, 144 pages, ISBN 0-9802335-1-8)

=== Books ===
- The Trigrams of Han: Inner Structures of the I Ching, Thorsons Publishers, 1989. ISBN 978-0850308082
- I Ching: An Annotated Bibliography. Routledge (2002), co-authored with Edward A. Hacker and Lorraine Patsco. ISBN 978-0415939690
- V for Vendetta (based on the screenplay by the Wachowskis, for the film), Pocket Star, 31 January 2006, ISBN 1-4165-1699-9
- Somnium: A Fantastic Romance. Strange Attractor Press (2011), afterword by Alan Moore. ISBN 978-1907222061

==== Fortean Times ====
===== Fortean Tomes =====
- Yesterday's News Tomorrow: Fortean Times Issues 1–15 (Indexer) (John Brown Publishing, 1992 2nd ed. 1995) ISBN 1-870870-26-3
- Diary of a Mad Planet: Fortean Times Issues 16–25 (Indexer, co-editor original magazines) (John Brown Publishing Ltd, 2nd ed. 1995) ISBN 1-870021-25-8
- Seeing Out the Seventies: Fortean Times Issues 26–30 (Indexer, co-editor original magazines) (John Brown Publishing Ltd, 1990) ISBN 1-870021-20-7
- Gateways to Mystery: Fortean Times Issues 31–36 (Indexer, co-editor original magazines) (John Brown Publishing Ltd, 1993) ISBN 1-870870-37-9
- Heaven's Reprimands: Fortean Times Issues 37–41 (Indexer, co-editor original magazines) (John Brown Publishing Ltd, 1994) ISBN 1-870870-52-2
- If Pigs Could Fly: Fortean Times Issues 42–46 (Indexer, co-editor original magazines) (John Brown Publishing Ltd, 1994) ISBN 1-870870-47-6
- Fishy Yarns: Fortean Times Issues 47–51 (Indexer, co-editor original magazines) (John Brown Publishing Ltd, 1994) ISBN 1-870870-48-4
- Bonfire of the Oddities: Fortean Times Issues 52–56 (Indexer, co-editor original magazines) (John Brown Publishing Ltd, 1995) ISBN 1-870870-61-1
- Strange Attractors: Fortean Times Issues 57–62 (Indexer, co-editor original magazines) (John Brown Publishing Ltd, 1996) ISBN 1-870870-73-5
- Plumber from Lhasa: Fortean Times Issues 63–67 (Indexer, co-editor original magazines) (John Brown Publishing Ltd, 1996) ISBN 1-870870-79-4
- Memories of Hell: Fortean Times Issues 68–72 (Indexer, co-editor original magazines) (John Brown Publishing Ltd, 1997) ISBN 1-870870-90-5
- Mouthful of Mysteries: Fortean Times Issues 73–77 (Indexer, co-editor original magazines) (John Brown Publishing Ltd, 1998) ISBN 1-870870-66-2
- Snakes Alive!: Fortean Times Issues 93–97 (Indexer, co-editor original magazines) (John Brown Publishing Ltd, 1998) ISBN 1-902212-04-5

===== Fortean Studies =====
- Fortean Studies: Volume 1 (as editor, John Brown Publishing Ltd, 1994, paperback, ISBN 1-870870-55-7)
- Fortean Studies: Volume 2 (as editor, John Brown Publishing Ltd, 1995, paperback, ISBN 1-870870-70-0)
- Fortean Studies: Volume 3 (as editor, John Brown Publishing Ltd, 1996, paperback, ISBN 1-870870-82-4)
- Fortean Studies: Volume 4 (as editor, John Brown Publishing Ltd, 1998, paperback, ISBN 1-870870-96-4)
- Fortean Studies: Volume 5 (as editor, John Brown Publishing Ltd, 1998, paperback, ISBN 1-902212-14-2)
- Fortean Studies: Volume 6 (as editor, John Brown Publishing Ltd, 1998, paperback, ISBN 1-902212-20-7)

===== Other =====
- Fortean Times Index (John Brown Publishing Ltd, Oct 1997) ISBN 1-870870-68-9
- Fortean Times Book of Strange Deaths (as compiler, John Brown Publishing Ltd Oct 1997) ISBN 1-870870-50-6
- Fortean Times Book of Close Shaves (as compiler, John Brown Publishing Ltd Oct 1999) ISBN 1-902212-18-5
