= Big Dave (character) =

Comics character

Character information
- First appearance: 2000 AD #842 (1993)
- Created by: Grant Morrison; Mark Millar; Steve Parkhouse

Publication information
- Publisher: Fleetway
- Schedule: Weekly
Title(s)
2000 AD #842–845
2000AD Yearbook 1994
2000 AD #846–849
2000 AD #869–872
2000 AD #904–907
- Formats: Original material for the series has been published as a strip in the comics anthology(s) 2000 AD.
- Genre: Humor/comedy
- Publication date: 1993–1994
- Main character(s): Big Dave

Creative team
- Writer(s): Grant Morrison; Mark Millar
- Artist(s): Steve Parkhouse; Anthony Williams

Big Dave is a comics character created and written by Grant Morrison and Mark Millar, with artwork by Steve Parkhouse, for 2000 AD.

The character was created for The Summer Offensive, an experiment in which the magazine was handed over to Millar, Morrison and John Smith for eight weeks.

== Publication history ==
Big Dave first appeared in prog (the 2000 AD term for issue) #842 in his first story which featured Saddam Hussein trying to take over the world and turn everyone into "poofs" with the aid of some scary aliens. Big Dave, "the hardest man in Manchester", manages to stop Saddam's plan with the help of Terry Waite.

The next story featured the British royal family as robots plus The Princess of Wales and The Duchess of York as a pair of horny drunks. The story ends with Dave in bed with both royals.

A third story had Dave leading a minibus full of disabled children to the football world cup final where they defeat a German team managed by Adolf Hitler.

== Bibliography ==
He has largely appeared in his own eponymous strip:

- Big Dave (written by Grant Morrison and Mark Millar):
  - "Target Baghdad" (with Steve Parkhouse, in 2000 AD #842–845, 1993)
  - "Monarchy in the UK" (with Steve Parkhouse, in 2000 AD #846–849, 1993)
  - "Young Dave" (with Steve Parkhouse, in 2000AD Yearbook 1994, 1993)
  - "Costa del Chaos" (with Anthony Williams, in 2000 AD #869–872, 1994)
  - "Wotta Lotta Balls" (with Steve Parkhouse, in 2000 AD #904–907, 1994)
