= Eddy Current (comics) =

1987 limited comic-book series

Cover of the Eddy Current trade paperback.

Eddy Current is a twelve issues comic-book series created in 1987 by Ted McKeever and published by Mad Dog Graphics.

This and Transit were later tied into McKeever's Metropol world.

== Publication ==
- Eddy Current (12-issue limited series, Mad Dog Graphics 1987–1988, trade paperback, hardcover, Dark Horse Comics, 1991, ISBN 1-878574-20-5)
- Eddy Current (three part re-issue, Atomeka Press, 2005)
