= Bix Barton =

Bix Barton is a fictional comic book character featured in the British science fiction anthology magazine 2000 AD. The character was created by artist Jim McCarthy and writer Peter Milligan, and first appeared in print in 1990.

The Barton stories are humorous in nature and deal with the adventures of the character in his role as sole employee of Her Majesty's Government's Department of the Irrational where he uses Holmes-like abilities to solve cases relating to weird and supernatural ("rum and uncanny") events.

== Bibliography ==
- Bix Barton (by Peter Milligan and Jim McCarthy):
  - "Barton's Beasts" (in 2000 AD #663-668, 1990)
  - "The Indigestible Case of the Haunted Full English" (in 2000 AD Sci-Fi Special 1990)
  - "The Disproportionate Man" (in 2000 AD Winter Special 1990)
  - "Carry On Barton" (in 2000 AD #723-728, 1991)
  - "Lovesick World" (in 2000 AD #737-741, 1991)
  - "Bloated Case of the Fatted Keef" (in 2000 AD #761-766, 1991)
  - "The Mouth Thief" (in 2000 AD Yearbook 1993, 1992)
  - "The Crying Scotsman" (in 2000 AD Sci-Fi Special 1993)
  - "Nigel the Napolean of East Finchley" (in 2000 AD #912-917, 1994)
