= Lazarus Churchyard =

- Lazarus Churchyard: The Final Cut. Cover art by Matt Brooker a.k.a. D'Israeli.

Publication information
- Publisher: Tundra Press
- First appearance: Blast! #1 (1991)
- Created by: Warren Ellis (script); D'Israeli (art)

In-story information
- Abilities: Plastic implants that can adapt to defend against any attack.

Lazarus Churchyard is a fictional character in a British comics series, created in 1991 by Warren Ellis and illustrated by Matt Brooker under the pseudonym D'Israeli. The stories are cyberpunk in theme, although Ellis himself does not consider it so and prefers to call it "decadent SF".

== Publication history ==
Lazarus Churchyard stories originally appeared in Blast! magazine, and were reprinted in the Judge Dredd Megazine. Although some stories have been illustrated by others, Ellis has said he considers only the D'Israeli-illustrated work "the definitive Churchyard".

Tundra Press released three issues of an eponymous comic book series in 1992. It was collected the same year as the trade paperback Lazarus Churchyard: The Final Cut (Atomeka Press), reissued by Image Comics (ISBN 1-58240-180-2) in 2001.

== Fictional character biography ==
The eponymous central character took part in a "plasborging" experiment in which around eighty per cent of his body was replaced with an intelligent, evolving plastic, which can react in 0.132 of a second to any situation and adapt accordingly. In the story, this adaptation usually takes the form of growing spikes, blades or similar weapons. The plastic also processes toxins of all kinds, essentially making Churchyard immortal.

The stories take place 400 years after this experiment. Churchyard is by now tired of his immortality and wants to die. He inhabits a dystopian future in which the United Kingdom has been taken over by the corporation Isis-Elek and renamed Savoy, while large parts of the globe have been rendered uninhabitable by germ warfare.

== In popular culture ==
The hard rock bands Lucy's Drowning and Meathook Seed both took their names from elements of the story.
