= Preacher (comics) =

Comic book series

- The main and supporting cast of Preacher on the cover of issue #56 by Glenn Fabry.

Publication information
- Publisher: Vertigo imprint of DC Comics
- Schedule: Monthly
- Genre: Southern Gothic, satire, supernatural, action, dark fantasy, black comedy
- Publication date: 1995–2000
- No. of issues: 66 (plus 5 specials and a 4-issue miniseries)
- Main characters: Jesse Custer; Tulip O'Hare; Cassidy; Saint of Killers; Herr Starr; God; Arseface

Creative team
- Created by: Garth Ennis; Steve Dillon
- Written by: Garth Ennis
- Artist(s): Steve Dillon; Glenn Fabry; Carlos Ezquerra
- Letterer: Clem Robins
- Colorist(s): Matt Hollingsworth; Pamela Rambo

Preacher is an American epic supernatural comic book series created by writer Garth Ennis and artist Steve Dillon. The series follows a disillusioned Texas preacher who is bound to a Biblical entity and journeys across America to literally find God. It was published from 1995 to 2000 by DC Comics' Vertigo imprint.

The title consists of 75 issues in total – 66 regular, monthly issues, five one-shot specials, and a four-issue Preacher: Saint of Killers limited series. It was celebrated for its dark humor and religious satire, and won the Eisner Award for Best Continuing Series in 1999.

An epilogue to Preacher was published in Ennis' subsequent series The Boys in February 2009. A television adaptation aired on AMC for 43 episodes over four seasons from 2016 to 2019.

== Plot ==
Preacher tells the story of Jesse Custer, a preacher in the small Texas town of Annville. Custer is accidentally possessed by the supernatural creature named Genesis, the infant of the unauthorized, unnatural coupling of an angel and a demon.

Genesis has no sense of individual will, but since it is composed of both pure goodness and pure evil, its power might rival that of God Himself, making Jesse Custer, bonded to Genesis, potentially the most powerful being in the universe.

Driven by a strong sense of right and wrong, Custer journeys across the United States attempting to literally find God, who abandoned Heaven the moment Genesis was born. He also begins to discover the truth about his new powers, allowing him, when he wills it, to command the obedience of those who hear and comprehend his words. He is joined by old girlfriend Tulip O'Hare, as well as a hard-drinking Irish vampire named Cassidy.

During the course of their journeys, the three encounter enemies and obstacles both sacred and profane, including The Saint of Killers, an invincible, quick-drawing, perfect-aiming, come-lately Angel of Death answering only to "He Who Sits On The Throne"; a disfigured suicide attempt survivor turned rock-star named Arseface; a serial-killer called the 'Reaver-Cleaver'; The Grail, a secret organization controlling the governments of the world and protecting the bloodline of Jesus; Herr Starr, primary enforcer for The Grail, a megalomaniac with a penchant for prostitutes, who wishes to use Custer for his own ends; several fallen angels; and Jesse's own redneck family — particularly his nasty Cajun grandmother, her mighty bodyguard Jody, and the Zoophilic T.C.

== Collected editions ==
Preacher trade paperbacks
Title	ISBN	Release date	Collected material
Preacher: Gone to Texas	978-1563892615	March 1, 1996	Preacher #1–7, 4-page foreword by Joe R. Lansdale
Preacher: Until the End of the World	978-1563893124	January 1, 1997	Preacher #8–17, 3-page foreword by Kevin Smith
Preacher: Proud Americans	978-1563893278	October 1, 1997	Preacher #18–26, 4-page foreword by Penn Jillette (of Penn & Teller)
Preacher: Ancient History	978-1563894053	March 1, 1998	Preacher Special: Saint of Killers #1–4, Preacher Special: The Story of You-Know-Who, and Preacher Special: The Good Old Boys, 2-page introduction by Garth Ennis
Preacher: Dixie Fried	978-1563894282	September 1, 1998	Preacher #27–33 and Preacher Special: Cassidy – Blood and Whiskey, no extras
Preacher: War in the Sun	978-1563894909	March 1, 1999	Preacher #34–40 and Preacher Special: One Man's War, 1-page recap, 2-page character introductions
Preacher: Salvation	978-1563895197	September 1, 1999	Preacher #41–50, no extras
Preacher: All Hell's A-Coming	978-1563896170	June 1, 2000	Preacher #51–58 and Preacher Special: Tall in the Saddle, 2-page character introductions, 2-page recap
Preacher: Alamo	978-1563897153	May 1, 2001	Preacher #59–66, 2-page character introductions, 2-page recap

Re-released trade paperbacks and hardcovers
Title	Format	ISBN	Release date	Collected material
Preacher: Book One	Hardcover	978-1401222796	July 21, 2009	Preacher #1–12
Preacher: Book One	TPB	978-1401240455	June 18, 2013	Preacher #1–12
Preacher: Book Two	Hardcover	978-1401225797	February 16, 2010	Preacher #13–26
Preacher: Book Two	TPB	978-1401242558	October 1, 2013	Preacher #13–26
Preacher: Book Three	Hardcover	978-1401230166	December 21, 2010	Preacher #27–33, Preacher Special: Saint of Killers #1–4, and Preacher Special: Cassidy – Blood and Whiskey
Preacher: Book Three	TPB	978-1401245016	January 28, 2014	Preacher #27–33, Preacher Special: Saint of Killers #1–4, and Preacher Special: Cassidy – Blood and Whiskey
Preacher: Book Four	Hardcover	978-1401230937	June 14, 2011	Preacher #34–40, Preacher Special: The Story of You-Know-Who, Preacher Special: The Good Old Boys, and Preacher Special: One Man's War
Preacher: Book Four	TPB	978-1401230944	June 24, 2014	Preacher #34–40, Preacher Special: The Story of You-Know-Who, Preacher Special: The Good Old Boys, and Preacher Special: One Man's War
Preacher: Book Five	Hardcover	978-1401232504	November 29, 2011	Preacher #41–54
Preacher: Book Five	TPB	978-1401250744	August 19, 2014	Preacher #41–54
Preacher: Book Six	Hardcover	978-1401234157	January 17, 2012	Preacher #55–66 and Preacher Special: Tall in the Saddle
Preacher: Book Six	TPB	978-1401252793	November 4, 2014	Preacher #55–66 and Preacher Special: Tall in the Saddle

Absolute Editions
Title	ISBN	Release date	Collected material
Absolute Preacher, Vol. 1	978-1401264413	July 12, 2016	Preacher #1–26
Absolute Preacher, Vol. 2	978-1401268091	May 9, 2017	Preacher #27–40, Preacher Special: Saint of Killers #1–4, Preacher Special: The Story of You-Know-Who, Preacher Special: The Good Old Boys, Preacher Special: Cassidy – Blood and Whiskey, and Preacher Special: One Man's War
Absolute Preacher, Vol. 3	978-1401278489	April 25, 2018	Preacher #41–66 and Preacher Special: Tall in the Saddle

Omnibus Editions
Title	ISBN	Release date	Collected Material
Preacher: The 25th Anniversary Omnibus Vol. 1	978-1779502674	August 4, 2020	Preacher #1-33, Preacher Special: Saint of Killers #1–4, Preacher Special: Cassidy – Blood and Whiskey
Preacher: The 25th Anniversary Omnibus Vol. 2	978-1779510372	August 31, 2021	Preacher # 34-66, Preacher Special: The Story of You-Know-Who, Preacher Special: The Good Old Boys, Preacher Special: One Man's War, Preacher Special: Tall in the Saddle

Additionally, the book Preacher: Dead or Alive (ISBN 9781563898488) collects Fabry's covers to the series.

== Adaptations ==
=== Adaptation attempts ===
Garth Ennis, feeling Preacher would translate perfectly as a film, sold the film rights to Electric Entertainment. Rachel Talalay was hired to direct, with Ennis writing the script. Rupert Harvey and Tom Astor were set as producers. By May 1998, Ennis completed three drafts of the script, based largely on the Gone to Texas story arc. The filmmakers found it difficult financing Preacher because investors found the idea religiously controversial. Ennis approached Kevin Smith and Scott Mosier to help finance the film under their View Askew Productions banner. Ennis, Smith and Mosier pitched Preacher to Bob Weinstein at Miramax Films.

Weinstein was confused by the characterization of Jesse Custer. Miramax also did not want to share the box office gross with Electric Entertainment, ultimately dropping the pitch. By May 2000, Smith and Mosier were still attached to produce with Talalay directing, but Smith did not know the status of Preacher, feeling it would languish in development hell. By then, Storm Entertainment, a UK-based production company known for their work on independent films, joined the production with Electric Entertainment. In September 2001, the two companies announced Preacher had been greenlighted to commence pre-production, with filming to begin in November and Talalay still directing Ennis' script. The production and start dates were pushed back because of financial issues of the $25 million projected budget.

James Marsden was cast in the lead role as Jesse Custer sometime in 2002. He explained, "It was something I never knew anything about, but once I got my hands on the comic books, I was blown away by it." In a March 2004 interview, Marsden said the filmmakers were hoping for filming to start the following August. With the full-length film adaptation eventually abandoned with budgetary concerns, HBO announced in November 2006 that they commissioned Mark Steven Johnson and Howard Deutch to produce a television pilot. Johnson was to write with Deutch directing. Impressed with Johnson's pilot script, HBO had him write the series bible for the first season. Johnson first planned "to turn each comic book issue into a single episode" on a shot-for-shot basis. "I gave [HBO] the comics, and I said, 'Every issue is an hour'. Ennis said 'You don't have to be so beholden to the comic'. And I'm like, 'No, no, no. It's got to be like the comic'."

Johnson also wanted to make sure that one-shots were included as well. Johnson changed his position, citing new storylines conceived by Ennis. "Well, there would be nothing new to add if we did that, so Garth [Ennis] and I have been creating new stories for the series," he said. "I love the book so much and I was telling Garth that he has to make the stories we are coming up with as comics because I want to see them." By August 2008, new studio executives at HBO decided to abandon the idea, finding it too stylistically dark and religiously controversial. Columbia Pictures then purchased the film rights in October 2008 with Sam Mendes planned to direct. Neal H. Moritz and Jason Netter would have produced the film. The previous scripts written by Ennis would not have been used.

=== AMC television series ===
On November 16, 2013, it was announced that AMC would be shooting a pilot for Preacher. On November 18, 2013, Bleeding Cool confirmed that Seth Rogen and Evan Goldberg had developed the series pilot with Sam Catlin, and that it would be distributed by Sony Pictures Television. On February 7, 2014, it was made public that AMC was officially developing the series to television based on the pilot written by Seth Rogen and Evan Goldberg. Rogen had no plans to co-star in the series. On May 9, 2014, AMC announced that Preacher was picked up to series. Preacher was slated to premiere mid to late 2015, as announced by Seth Rogen, with the script for the series complete and the pilot ordered by the studio. Comic creators Steve Dillon and Garth Ennis were to work on this project as co-executive producer. On April 17, 2015, Seth Rogen tweeted that Dominic Cooper was cast in the role of Jesse Custer, Joseph Gilgun as Cassidy, Ruth Negga as Tulip O'Hare, Ian Colletti as Arseface, and W. Earl Brown as Sheriff Hugo Root. On September 9, 2015, Seth Rogen announced via Twitter that the series ordered to a ten-episode first season and was due to premiere in mid-2016. The series premiered on AMC on Sunday, May 22, 2016, and concluded July 31. A second season, with thirteen episodes, aired from June 25 to September 11, 2017. From June 24 to August 26, 2018, a ten-episode third season aired. In November 2018, the series was renewed for a fourth and final ten-episode season, with production relocating to Australia, and the season airing from August 4 to September 29, 2019.

=== GraphicAudio audiobook series ===
In May 2020, all 98 issues of Garth Ennis' The Boys comic book series and the 8-issue epilogue series Dear Becky were adapted into seven full cast audiobooks produced by GraphicAudio, with all volumes numbering a combined 31 hours in length. In the second audiobook, the Preacher epilogue from "We Gotta Go Now" is adapted, with Michael John Casey voicing Proinsias Cassidy.

== Legacy ==
Stephen King has said that his comic book series The Dark Tower: The Gunslinger Born, based on his The Dark Tower series of novels, was influenced by Preacher.

The character Yorick from Y: The Last Man, has a Zippo lighter with the words "Fuck Communism" engraved, identical to the one owned by Jesse Custer in Preacher. When asked about it he says it is "from this book I read once... a graphic novel. You know, like a comic book." The phrase originated as a 1963 satirical poster produced by The Realist magazine's Paul Krassner. This lighter appears later in the series when Yorick and Agent 355 are being held by Russian agents at gunpoint, who find the lighter and take offense to it.

In February 2009, an older now-human Proinsias Cassidy appears in an epilogue cameo role in the fourth volume of Garth Ennis' first ongoing comic book series after Preacher, the DC Comics (WildStorm)/Dynamite Entertainment series The Boys – "We Gotta Go Now" – in the twenty-seventh issue overall, depicted as a former friend and sponsor of Billy Butcher working as a bartender, clearing out his bar on St. Patrick's Day so that Billy can drink in peace while waiting for Wee Hughie Campbell.

IGN declared Preacher the third-greatest Vertigo comic, after The Saga of the Swamp Thing and The Sandman.

Jesse Custer was ranked the 11th Greatest Comic Book Character by Empire magazine. The Saint of Killers was ranked at number 42 on the same list.
