= Steve Dillon =

British comic artist (1962–2016)

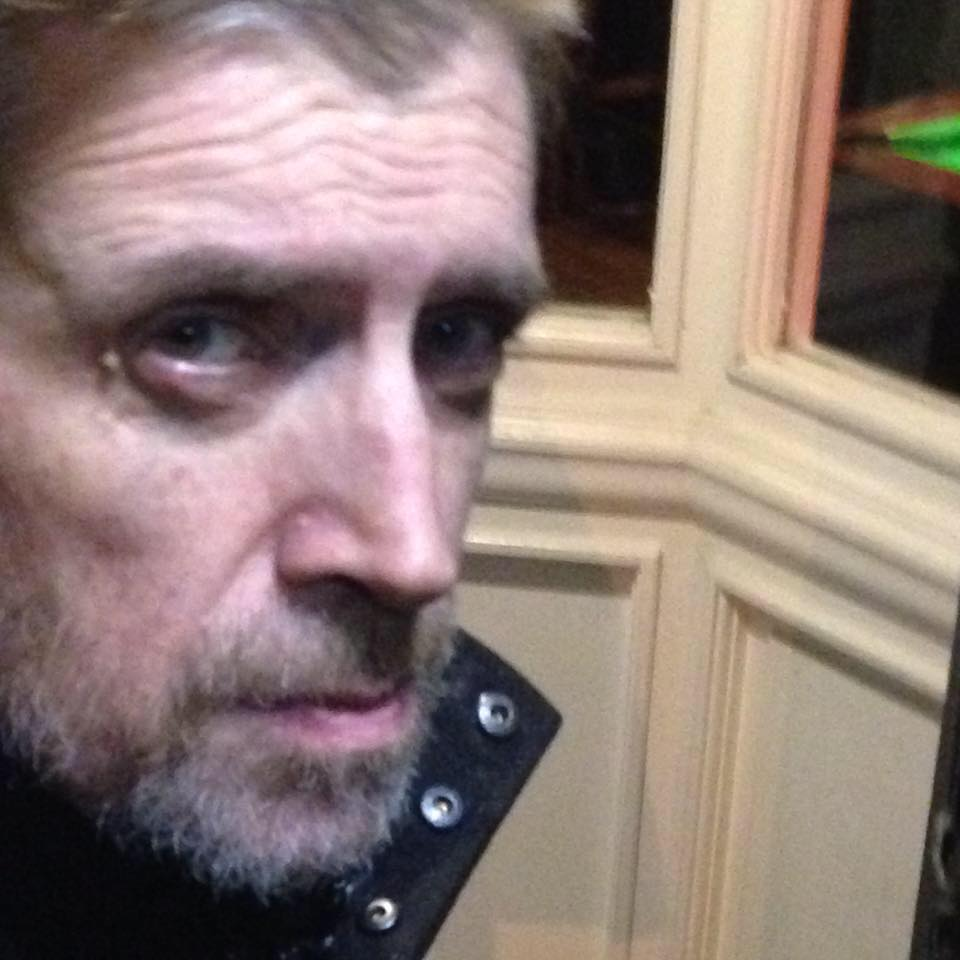
- Steve Dillon in 2015
- Born: 22 March 1962 London, England
- Died: 22 October 2016 (aged 54) New York City, US
- Areas: Penciller, Inker
- Notable works: Hellblazer; Preacher; Punisher
- Awards: National Comics Award (1998); Harvey Award (1999); Eagle Award (2000)

Steve Dillon (22 March 1962 – 22 October 2016) was a British comic book artist, best known for his work with writer Garth Ennis on Hellblazer, Preacher and The Punisher.

== Early life ==
Dillon was born in London in 1962 and raised in Luton, Bedfordshire. He was the oldest of three siblings, a sister younger by three years, Julie, and a brother younger by nine years who is cartoonist/costume designer Glyn Dillon.

While attending Icknield High School, Dillon first realised his potential as a serious comic book artist during the production of a school comic book called Ultimate Sci Fi Adventures with school friends Neil Bailey & Paul Mahon in 1975. His first strip in this comic was "The Space Vampire". This was followed by the Escape from the Planet of the Apes series.

== Career ==
Dillon got his first professional work at the age of 16, drawing the title story in the first issue of Hulk Weekly for Marvel UK, later working on the Nick Fury strip. In the 1980s he also drew for Warrior and Doctor Who Magazine, where he created the character of Abslom Daak. He did a considerable amount of work for the comics 2000 AD and Warrior.

Along with Brett Ewins, Dillon started the seminal comic magazine Deadline in 1988, which continued for another seven years and was instrumental in supporting young, underground, comic artists such as Jamie Hewlett as well as championing and supporting new bands of the period such as The Senseless Things and Blur. Deadline is highly regarded for bringing underground comics and graphic novels into the mainstream during the 1990s. and can be considered as a precursor for publications such as Loaded and Dazed and Confused, as well as defining and promoting the nascent Britpop movement of the time.

In mid-1989, Dillon met writer Garth Ennis, with whom he eventually had his most notable professional collaborations. During a social gathering about a year later in Dublin, Ennis recalls, "After everyone else had passed out, we sat up 'til dawn and killed off a bottle of Jameson, talking about what we wanted to do in comics- what we thought could be done with them, what the medium was for. I can recall a sort of mutual 'Oh yes, you. You're the one. You get it.' This was to pay off handsomely in the years to come." With Ennis, Dillon worked on Hellblazer and, later, on Preacher which concluded in 2000 after 66 issues. Dillon also created the character Dogwelder, featured in Ennis's series Hitman, and the aptly named Sixpack and Dogwelder comic series, that ran from 2016 to 2017.

Preacher was made into a critically acclaimed TV show in 2016, starring Dominic Cooper. Dillon is credited as co-executive producer on the series.

== Death ==
Dillon's younger brother, concept artist Glyn, announced on social media on 22 October 2016 that Dillon had died in New York City. The cause was complications of a ruptured appendix which Dillon had initially mistaken for food poisoning. His death was met with an outpouring of grief and a number of tributes from the comics creator community, as well as the following statement from DC Group editor Marie Javins:

To say working with Steve was a pleasure doesn't begin to describe his gentle nature, or his easygoing demeanor. I worked with him from 1991, long before Preacher, up to his most recent covers for Sixpack and Dogwelder, but his impact on the comics industry resonated most through his interpretation of Jesse Custer and company. His name, along with writer Garth Ennis, is practically synonymous with Preacher, but I know him as a lovable wisecracker who enjoyed New York, and could always be depended on to deliver a sly remark. Steve had a great sense of humor; it's fitting his last work for DC was a cover of a tin foil Dogwelder. To the rest of the world, he's a giant among creators and artists. He will be missed by us all here at DC and Vertigo.

Dillon's long-time collaborator Garth Ennis paid tribute to Dillon thus:

The last time I saw Steve was late last Saturday night in New York, walking down Fifth Avenue to his hotel after saying goodnight outside Foley's. It could have been the end of any one of a thousand nights. It's not a bad last memory to have. Steve was best man at my wedding and my good and dear friend. I think he probably taught me more about what that word means than anyone else.

The first episode of season two of the Preacher TV series is dedicated to Dillon.

== Awards ==
- 1998 National Comics Award for Best Artist
- 1999 Harvey Award for Best Continuing Series for Preacher
- 2000 Eagle Award for Favourite (Colour) Comic for Preacher

== Bibliography ==
=== UK publishers ===
==== Self-published ====
- Sci-Fi Adventures (school comic by Dillon/Bailey/Mahon)
  - Issue #5 Nov 1974 "The Space Vampire"
  - Special Issue Feb 1975 " Escape From the Planet of the Apes" Chapter 1
  - Issue #9 Apr 1975 "Escape From the Planet of the Apes" Chapters 2 & 3
  - Issue #10 May 1975 "Escape From the Planet of the Apes" Chapter 4
  - Issue #11 June 1975 "Escape From the Planet of the Apes" Chapter 5
  - Issue #12 July 1975 "Escape From the Planet of the Apes" Chapter 6
  - Issue #13(final issue) Aug/Sept 1975 "Conquest of the Planet of the Apes" Chapter 1
- Ultimate Science Fiction
  - Story in #1–3 (1977–1978)

==== Marvel UK ====
- Hulk Comic (magazine)
  - Nick Fury stories in #1–19 (1979)
  - Hulk story in #2 (1979)
  - Ant-Man story in #48–49 (1980)
- Doctor Who Magazine
  - Kroton stories in #5–7 and #23–24 (1979–1980)
  - Plutar story in #9-11 (1979)
  - Ogron story in #13–14 (1980)
  - Abslom Daak stories in #17–20 and #27–29 (1980)
  - Moderator story in #84 and #86–87 (1984)
- Blake's 7
  - Stories in #9 and #11–12 (1982)

==== Fleetway ====
- 2000 AD
  - Judge Dredd stories in Sci-Fi Special 1980, #205, #242–243, #305–307, #322–328, #353, #374–375, #393, #397–399, #404–405, #409, #443, #450, Sci-Fi Special 1986, #505, #511–512, #610, (Note: Artwork intended for 2000 AD #404; lost, then rediscovered.) #702–706, #727–732, #783, and Judge Dredd Yearbook 1993 (1980–1981; 1983–1987; 1989–1992)
  - Ro-Jaws story in #189–190 (1980)
  - Mean Arena stories in #199–200 and #218–223 (1981)
  - Ro-Busters story in Annual 1982 (1981)
  - Rogue Trooper stories in #379–380, #495–499, #520–531, #535–539, #553–554, #568–572, #574–575, #589, #598–600, #602–603, #624–630, #633–635, Winter Special 1989 (as writer), and Rogue Trooper Annual 1991 (1984; 1986–1990)
  - ABC Warriors story in Annual 1985 (1984)
  - Future Shocks in #442, #479, #572 (as writer), and #588 (as writer) (1985–1986; 1988)
  - Hap Hazzard stories in #561, #567, #588, #609–610, and #1164 (1988–1989; 1999)
  - Tyranny Rex stories in #566–568, #582–584, and Sci-Fi Special 1988 (1988)
  - Bad Company story in #601 (as inker) (1988)
  - Harlem Heroes story in #671–676, #683–699, and #701–702 (1990)
- Diceman
  - ABC Warriors story in #2 (1986)
  - Diceman stories in #4–5 (1986)
- The Comic Relief Comic One-shot (1991)

==== Quality ====
- Warrior
  - Laser Eraser and Pressbutton stories in #1–3, #5–11, and #15 (1982–83)
  - Marvelman story in #4 (Note: Cover has no number; reads "Warrior Summer Special 1982".) (1982)

==== Deadline ====
- Deadline
  - Stories in #1–20 (as editor) (1988–1990)

==== Other ====
IPC Magazines

- Scream! #8 (1984)

Pyramid Books

- Spitting Image: The Giant Komic Book OGN (1988)

Atomeka Press

- A1 #5 and #6A (1991–1992)

John Brown

- Blast! #1 (1991)

=== DC Comics ===
Main artist

- Skreemer #1–6 (as inker) (1989)
- Animal Man #29, #33–38, #40–41, #43, #45, and #47–50 (1990–1992)
- Hellblazer #49, #57–58, and #62 (Note: Becomes one of the first Vertigo titles, starting the next issue.) (1992–1993)
- The Atom Special #1 (1993)
- Legion Worlds #5 (2001)

Contributor

- Who's Who: The Definitive Directory of the DC Universe #19 (1986)
- Focus One-shot (Note: Character designs meant for Wanderers, not otherwise used.) (1987)
- Hitman #60 (2001)
- Superman: American Alien #4 (2016)

==== Vertigo ====
Main artist

- Hellblazer #63–76, #78–83, #157, #175–176, and #200 (1993–1994; 2001–2002; 2004)
  - Confessional One-shot (1993)
  - Heartland One-shot (1997)
- Preacher #1–66 (1995–2000)
  - Cassidy: Blood and Whiskey OGN (1998)
  - Tall in the Saddle OGN (1999)

Contributor

- Vertigo Jam One-shot (1993)
- The Vertigo Gallery: Dreams and Nightmares One-shot (1995)
- Vertigo: Winter's Edge #1 (as interviewee) (1998)
- Transmetropolitan: I Hate It Here One-shot (2000)
- Vertigo X Anniversary One-shot (as interviewee) (2003)
- Scalped #50 (2011)

==== Paradox ====
Contributor

- The Big Book of Death OGN (1995)

==== WildStorm ====
Main artist

- Wildcats #20–21 (2001)
- Global Frequency #3 (2003)

=== Marvel Comics ===
Main artist

- The Punisher: Countdown One-shot (Note: Minicomic packaged with the DVD release of The Punisher.) (2004)
- Wolverine: Origins #1–25 (2006–2008)
- X-Men: Hope One-Shot (Note: Single story: originally printed across four back-up features.) (2010), collecting:
  - Psylocke #1 (2010)
  - Dark X-Men #1 (2010)
  - X-Men Legacy #230 (2010)
  - X-Force #22 (2010)
- Wolverine #304 (2012)
- Incredible Hulk #8 (2012)
- Avenging Spider-Man #11 (2012)
- Thunderbolts #1–6 and #12 (2013)
- Scarlet Witch #3 (2016)
- The Punisher #1–6 (2016)

Contributor

- Daredevil #1/2 One-shot (1999)
- Scarlet Witch #4 (2016)
- The Punisher #7 (Note: The Punisher #7 was unfinished at the time of Dillon's death.) (2016)

==== Epic ====
Main artist

- Doctor Zero #5 (as inker) (1988)
- Car Warriors #1–4 (1991)

==== Marvel Knights ====
Main artist

- Punisher #1–12 (2000–2001)
- Punisher #1–7, #13–14, #18–23, and #32 (2001–2003)
- Bullseye: Greatest Hits #1–5 (2005)
- Punisher vs. Bullseye #1–5 (2005–2006)
- Punisher War Zone #1–6 (2009)

==== Ultimate ====
Main artist

- Ultimate X-Men #58 (2005)
- The Ultimates 2 Annual 1 (2005)
- Ultimate Avengers #13–18 (Note: Covers instead read "Ultimate Avengers 3 #1–6", respectively.) (2010–2011)

==== MAX ====
Main artist

- Supreme Power: Nighthawk #1–6 (2005–2006)
- Punisher MAX #1–22 (2010–2012)

=== Image Comics ===
==== WildStorm ====
Main artist

- Gen^{13} Annual 1 (1997)
- Gen^{13} Bootleg Annual 1 (1998)

=== Other publishers ===
Eclipse Comics

- The Johnny Nemo Magazine #3 (as inker) (1986)
- 3-D Laser Eraser and Pressbutton One-shot (as writer) (1986)

Penthouse

- Penthouse Men's Adventure Comix
  - Kodiak story in #6 (1996)
