= Pamela Rambo =

American comic book colorist

Pamela Rambo is a colorist who has worked in the comics industry, perhaps best known for her work on Dark Horse Comics's Star Wars series. Additionally, she has worked for DC Comics's Vertigo imprint on such titles as Preacher and Y: The Last Man. After filling in for issue 13 of Preacher, Rambo eventually took over coloring duties from Matt Hollingsworth at issue 31, maintaining a consistent style on the book during the second half of its run, with the series winning an Eisner Award in 1999 for best continuing series. Her work on Y: The Last Man has seen her regarded as an unsung hero by series creator Brian K. Vaughan and a fan favourite.
