= Bad Company (comics) =

Comic book team

- Cover of the Bad Company: Goodbye, Krool World trade paperback by Jock

Publication information
- Publisher: IPC Magazines, Fleetway Publications, Rebellion Developments
- First appearance: 2000 AD #500 (December 13, 1986)
- Created by: Peter Milligan

In-story information
- Type of organisation: Military unit
- Agent(s): Danny Franks; Mac; Trucker; Kano; Mad Tommy Churchill; Thrax; Wallbanger; Malcolm; Dogbrain; Flytrap; Gobber; Shrike; Joe Scummer; Stitches

Bad Company is a comic book concept initially created for British comics anthology 2000 AD by Alan Grant and John Wagner. According to Peter Milligan "Originally Bad Company had been devised as part of the Dredd mythos, featuring a Judge who had turned bad and been shipped off to a prison colony on Titan, one of Saturn's moons". Milligan, along with regular collaborators Brett Ewins and Jim McCarthy, dropped all aspects of the original concept, keeping only a team of new recruits facing an inhospitable planet and enemy. They first appeared in their self-titled strip in 2000 AD prog 500 (December 13, 1986).

== Plot ==
Humanity is at war with a strange alien species known as the Krool. Young soldier Danny Franks is fighting on the planet Ararat, recruited by the renegades known as Bad Company after the destruction of his own platoon. As their name might suggest this is no ordinary group of soldiers; instead they are a collection of freaks and maniacs led by Kano, a Frankenstein's monster-like character with a secret kept in a little box.

=== The Krool ===
The Krool are an alien species that serve as the main foe in Bad Company. They are led by a being known as the "Krool Heart" on the unnamed Krool Home Planet. The Krool Heart controls the Krool race via its vast psychic mind. Whatever the heart thinks, the mind will obey.

The Krool have the technology to create "War Zombies", hybrids and other such monstrosities. Due to their sadistic behaviour, they have also created machines to extract the "soul" out of their human prisoners. They have also been known to employ sadistic brainwashed human captives as guards.

The Krool were ultimately responsible for creating Bad Company and their leader when they took half a human brain and inserted it into a Krool and vice versa thus creating the Krool-hybrid. In conversation between Mad Tommy and Danny Franks Tommy explains that the Krool brain has reached its evolutionary limit, while Humanity are only using a fraction of their potential. This leads the Krool hybrid to lapse into insanity while Kano's human brain assumes dominance over the implanted Krool half-brain.

=== The Ararat War ===
The Ararat War was a war waged against Humanity. The Krool wanted to capture Ararat to add to their already extensive empire whereas the Earth elite needed it to evacuate to as Earth was on the verge of being destroyed by ecological catastrophe. They employed their "War Zombies" to attack the front line's defences. They finished off the survivors personally. Officially, the war ended when Ararat exploded but unofficially, the war continued on the Ghetto Planets, led by the remnants of Humanity who had survived the destruction of Earth.

=== Aftermath of the war ===
The second incarnation of Bad Company, now led by Danny Franks & consisting of the last Protoid (an alien shapeshifter) in existence, Sheeva a "Boom Baby", (genetically enhanced, and with the ability "...to make atoms dance...",) De Racine, one of the "Earth Elite" and a masochist called Rackman, track down a monster terrorizing the Ghetto Planets whilst looking for Kano, unaware that the two are one and the same. After finding and recruiting Kano, they use Protoids chameleon ship to head to the Krool Homeworld undetected in order to destroy the Krool once and for all. Sheeva, Rackman, De Racine and Protoid are killed, but the alien is revealed to have been a puppet of the true Protoid – the chameleon ship – who is trying to merge and replace the new Krool Heart. Instead, Danny takes the place of the Krool Heart, and Protoid is defeated. Afterwards, Danny/The Krool Heart allows the survivors and prisoners to leave the planet promising to make the Krool more passive, it being revealed that the sadistic excesses of the Krool had been due to the corruption and decadence of the old Krool Heart.

A few years later, Kano returns to the Krool Homeworld with a further incarnation of Bad Company. After a long battle, Kano and Bad Company managed to free Danny. As they leave, Kano elects to stay to continue fighting the Krool.

== Characters ==
- Danny Franks – a naive young soldier whose story we follow as he gets broken and broken in. He narrates the story through his diary. He later becomes the leader of Bad Company when Kano is thought dead.
- Mac – A member of the same battalion as Danny, who joins Bad Company at the same time.
- Trucker – Another member of Danny's battalion.
- Kano – the leader of Bad Company, who has had half his human brain replaced with a Krool half. For a time he keeps this fact a secret, and does not hesitate to kill those who might discover it, even his own men.
- Mad Tommy Churchill – a soldier who believes himself to be a British soldier fighting in World War II. This is later revealed to be a pretence: Tommy knows Kano's secret, and feigned insanity to appear harmless.
- Thrax – a cadaverous and unpleasant figure, who often expresses mistrust at Kano's leadership abilities.
- Wallbanger – the company's war robot, who as well as being a heavily armed fighter, is also the group's medic, scientist, food synthesizer and chef.
- Malcolm – one of the few members of the company to treat Danny in a friendly manner, and perhaps the most human.
- Dogbrain – a man whose brain has been replaced with that of a dog by the Krool.
- Flytrap – having lost his arm, he replaced it with a carnivorous Ararat plant. This makes him sensitive to changes in the Ararat environment.
- Gobber – a native of Ararat. He acts as the company's guide. He also has the ability to spit a substance like "unbreakable chewing gum".
- Shrike – Companion of Thrax – resembles a voodoo-style witch-doctor in appearance.
- Joe Scummer – Member of Bad Company. The first to try to open Kano's box.
- Stitches – Bad Company member with heavy facial scarring, hence his nickname.

== Bibliography ==
They have only appeared in their own strip:

- "Bad Company" (by Peter Milligan; Pencils: Brett Ewins; Inks: Jim McCarthy, in 2000 AD #500-519, 1986–1987)
- "The Bewilderness" (by Peter Milligan, Brett Ewins/Jim McCarthy, in 2000 AD #548-557, 1987–1988)
- "Young Men Marching" (by Peter Milligan, Brett Ewins/Jim McCarthy, in 2000AD Annual 1989, 1988)
- "The Krool Heart" (by Peter Milligan, Brett Ewins/Jim McCarthy, in 2000 AD #576-585, 1988)
- "Simply" (by Peter Milligan; Pencils: Brett Ewins; Inks: Steve Dillon, in 2000 AD #601, 1988)
- "Ararat" (by Peter Milligan, Brett Ewins/Jim McCarthy, in 2000 AD Annual 1990, 1989)
- "Kano" (by Peter Milligan, Brett Ewins/Jim McCarthy, in 2000 AD #828-837, 1993)
- "Down Among the Dead Men" (by Peter Milligan; Pencils: Brett Ewins; Inks: Jim McCarthy, in 2000AD Annual 2001, 2000)
- "Bad Company" (by Peter Milligan; Pencils: Brett Ewins; Inks: Jim McCarthy, in 2000 AD prog 2002 and #1273-1277, 2001–2002)
- "B.A.D. Company" (by Alan Grant/John Wagner and Carlos Ezquerra, in Judge Dredd Megazine 24 Sept, 2002)
- "First Casualties" (by Peter Milligan and Rufus Dayglo, in 2000 AD #1950–1961, 2015)
- "Terrorists" (by Peter Milligan and Rufus Dayglo, in 2000 AD #2061-2072, 2017–2018)

=== Collections ===
Titan Books released at least four collections between 1987 and 1988:

- Bad Company Book One (Titan Books, 1987, ISBN 1-85286-020-0) by Peter Milligan, Brett Ewins/Jim McCarthy/Tom Frame
- Bad Company Book Two (Titan Books, 1987, ISBN 1-85286-027-8) Peter Milligan, Brett Ewins/Jim McCarthy/Tom Frame
- Bad Company Book Three the Bewilderness (Titan Books, 1988, ISBN 1-85286-078-2) Peter Milligan, Brett Ewins/Jim McCarthy/Tom Frame
- Bad Company Book Four the Krool Heart (Titan Books, 1988, ISBN 1-85286-105-3) Peter Milligan, Brett Ewins/Jim McCarthy/Tom Frame

The more recent Rebellion collections have included:

- Bad Company: Goodbye, Krool World (Rebellion, 2005, ISBN 1-904265-27-8) consisting of reprints of the more popular strips from the 1980s.
- The Complete Bad Company (Rebellion, 2011, ISBN 978-1-907519-46-8) containing all the strips from 1986 to 2002.
- Bad Company: First Casualties (Rebellion, 2016, ISBN 978-1-78108-442-7) reprinting the first new Bad Company strip since 2002.
