= Jim McCarthy (comics) =

British comics creator

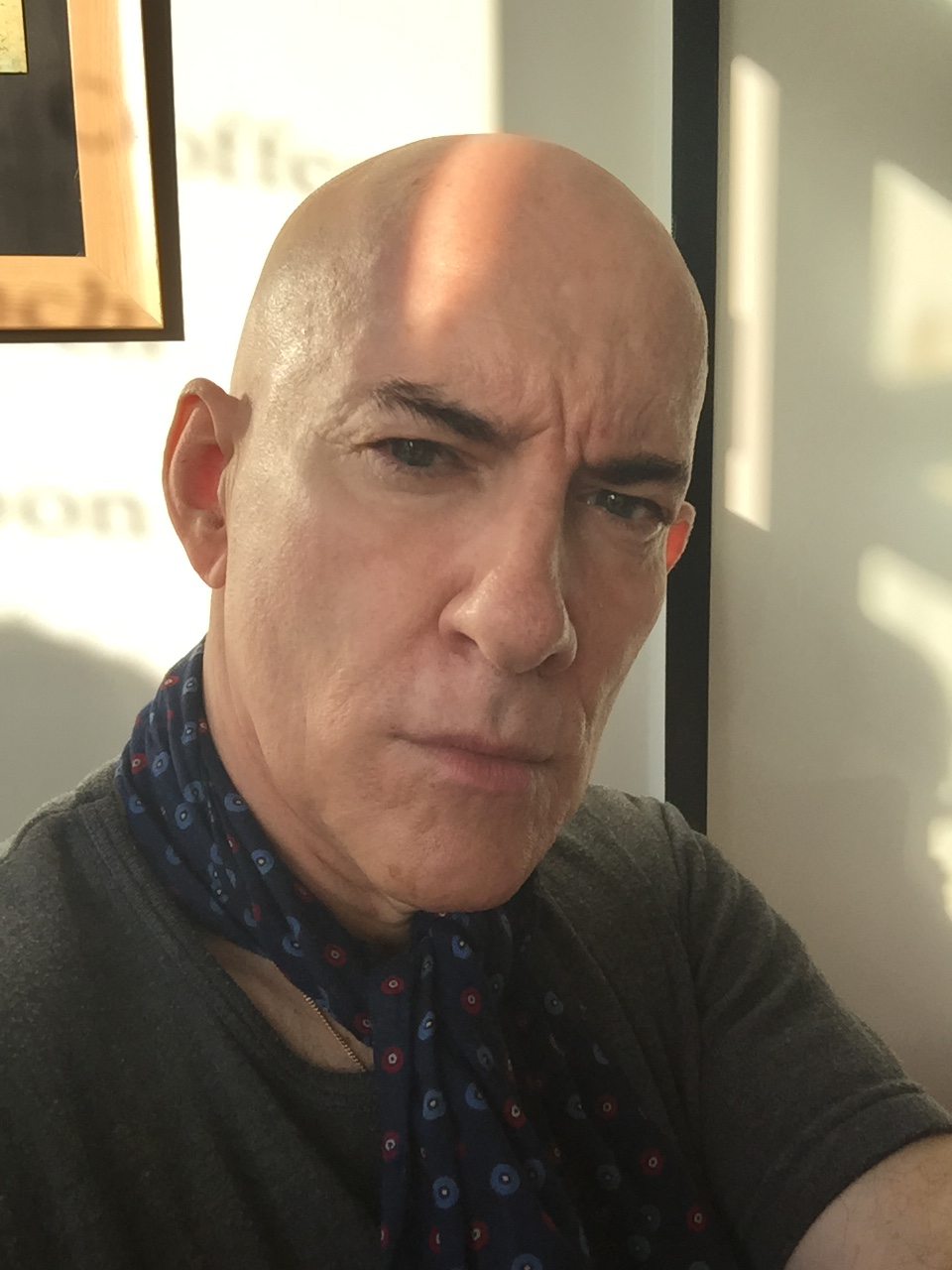
- Areas: Writer, Penciller, Artist, Inker, Colorist
- Notable works: Bad Company; Bix Barton
- Collaborators: Brett Ewins; Peter Milligan

Jim McCarthy is a British writer and artist. He worked on the comic Bad Company in 2000 AD before going on to write a number of graphic novels based on musicians, as well as becoming a music journalist.

He is the brother of Brendan McCarthy.

== Biography ==
Jim McCarthy studied art at Ealing College, leaving in 1975 and working as an artist in Europe for three years. Travelling to Germany, France, Belgium, Sweden, Switzerland, and various parts of the UK. Jim produced graphics and cartoons for industry practices for a period of over three years.

He started at 2000 AD in 1977 and 1978 on Tharg's Future Shocks, sharing art duties with Brett Ewins, a partnership that would continue on his return in 1986 for their long run on Bad Company with Peter Milligan. He would work solo with Milligan, again, on their occult detective series Bix Barton, and McCarthy would work steadily at 2000 AD throughout this period until 1996, briefly returning in 2001 and 2002 to draw more Future Shocks.

McCarthy would return to comics full-time in 2003 writing the first of a number of biographical graphic novels, including Godspeed: The Kurt Cobain Graphic, that was re-released in digest form in 2011, and Sex Pistols: The Graphic Novel. The NME reported that the former "had proved both controversial and commercially successful. Beaumont [the artist] received death threats from irate fans before Godspeed was even published".

He also writes about music, his first piece was about Jah Wobble whom he met when they were both in rehab, and he has since gone on to write a book on Latin rock.

In 2004 he wrote The Voices Of Latin Rock, a book dealing with the Mission District in San Francisco, and the fusion of Latin, salsa and rock for over 30 years. I have authored numerous graphic novels and created comic graphic artwork being published in both the US and UK markets. Subsequently, my work has been translated and published in Russia, Czechoslovakia, Spain, Norway, Italy, Poland, France, Croatia, Germany, Argentina and Japan.

== Bibliography ==
=== Comics ===
- Tharg's Future Shocks:
  - "Robot Repairs" (with writer Robert Flynn and artist Brett Ewins, in 2000 AD #37–38, November 1977)
  - "Stasis" (with writer Charles Swift and artist Brett Ewins, in 2000 AD No. 54, March 1978)
  - "Casualty" (with Hilary Robinson, in 2000 AD No. 590, September 1988)
  - "Cultural Exchange" (with Hilary Robinson, in 2000 AD No. 593, September 1988)
  - "The Birthday" (with Frances Lynn, in 2000 AD No. 918, December 1994)
  - "Headhunter" (with Kek-W, in 2000 AD #1242, May 2001)
  - "His Master's Voice" (with Jamie Woolley, in 2000 AD #1310, September 2002)
- Bad Company (with writer Peter Milligan and artist Brett Ewins):
  - Goodbye, Krool World (Rebellion, 256 pages, February 2005, ISBN 1-904265-27-8) collects:
    - "Bad Company" (inks, in 2000 AD #500–519, 1986–1987)
    - "The Bewilderness" (in 2000 AD #548–557, 1987–1988)
    - "The Krool Heart" (in 2000 AD #576–585, 1988)
  - Judge Dredd Megazine vol. 4 No. 15 (September 2002) reprints:
    - "Young Men Marching" (in 2000AD Annual 1989, 1988)
    - "Ararat" (in 2000AD Annual 1990, 1989)
  - Kano (Rebellion, 96 pages, October 2007, ISBN 1-905437-46-3) collects:
    - "Kano" (in 2000 AD #828–837, 1993)
    - "Down Among the Dead Men" (in 2000AD Annual 2001, 2000)
    - "Bad Company 2002" (in 2000 AD Prog 2002 and #1273–1277, 2001–2002)
- Hellblazer No. 7 (with writer Jamie Delano and artist Brett Ewins, DC Comics, June 1988)
- "The Geek" (with Malachy Coney, in Crisis No. 22, July 1989)
- Zenith: "Mandala: Shadows & Reflections" (with Grant Morrison, in 2000AD Annual 1990, October 1989)
- Bix Barton (by Peter Milligan):
  - "Barton's Beasts" (in 2000 AD #663–668, 1990)
  - "The Indigestible Case of the Haunted Full English" (in 2000 AD Sci-Fi Special 1990)
  - "The Disproportionate Man" (in 2000 AD Winter Special 1990)
  - "Carry On Barton" (in 2000 AD #723–728, 1991)
  - "Lovesick World" (in 2000 AD #737–741, 1991)
  - "Bloated Case of the Fatted Keef" (in 2000 AD #761–766, 1991)
  - "The Mouth Thief" (in 2000 AD Yearbook 1993, 1992)
  - "The Crying Scotsman" (in 2000 AD Sci-Fi Special 1993)
  - "Nigel the Napoleon of East Finchley" (in 2000 AD #912–917, 1994)
- Animal Man No. 44 (inks, with writer Tom Veitch, and pencils by Brett Ewins, DC Comics, February 1992)
- Rogue Trooper (with Mark Millar, in 2000AD Sci-Fi Special 1992, June 1992)
- The Grudge-Father:
  - "The Grudgefather" (with Mark Millar, in 2000 AD #878–883, 1994)
  - "Skin Games" (with Kek-W, in 2000 AD #940–945, May–June 1995)
- Kid Cyborg (with Kek-W, in 2000 AD #972–979, December 1995 – February 1996)

Graphic novels

- Godspeed: The Kurt Cobain Graphic (writer, with co-author Barnaby Legg and art by Flameboy, graphic novel, Omnibus Press, October 2003, 76 pages, ISBN 0-7119-9763-2, March 2011, 96 pages, ISBN 1-84938-699-4)
- Eminem: In My Skin (writer, with co-author Barnaby Legg and art by Flameboy, graphic novel, 96 pages, Omnibus Press, October 2004, ISBN 1-84449-488-8)
- Death Rap: Tupac Shakur – A Life (writer, with co-author Barnaby Legg and art by Flameboy, graphic novel, 96 pages, Omnibus Press, October 2005, ISBN 1-84449-727-5)
- Bad Company: Goodbye Krool World. Rebellion. 2007.
- Bad Company: Kano: Rebellion. 2007.
- Sex Pistols: The Graphic Novel (writer, with art by Steve Parkhouse, graphic novel, 96 pages, Omnibus Press, June 2008, ISBN 1-84609-508-5)
- The Complete Bad Company: Rebellion. 2011.
- Neverland: The Life and Death of Michael Jackson. Omnibus Press. 2012
- Sex Pistols: The Graphic Novel, Manga edition. 2012.
- 'Godspeed: The Kurt Cobain Graphic, Manga Edition: Omnibus Press. 2012.
- Gabba Gabba Hey: The Ramones Graphic Novel. Omnibus Press. 2013.
- Metallica: Nothing Else Matters. Omnibus Press. 2014.
- Reckless Life: Guns And Roses. Omnibus Press. 2015.
- Living For Kicks; A Mods Graphic novel. Omnibus Press. 2016.
- Who Are You? The Keith Moon Graphic. 2016.
- First Casualties; Bad Company trade paperback. 2016.
- Wake Up And Live: The Bob Marley Graphic. 2017.
- Bad Company -The Ultimate Collection.Volume One (Hardback) Rebellion. 2018.
- Bad Company - The Ultimate Collection.Volume Two (Hardback) Rebellion. 2019.

Foreign Rights Editions*******

- Godspeed: Une vie de Kurt Cobain. Flammarion Books, (French) 2004.
- Godspeed The Kurt Cobain Graphic: Andante: Robinbook Editiones.(Italy) 2004.
- Eminem - In My Skin. Andante: Robinbook Editiones.(Italy) 2004.
- Eminem - En Mi Piel (Biografías De Las Estrellas Del Rock) (Spanish) Paperback.2005.
- Godspeed The Kurt Cobain Graphic: Swarskopf & Swarskopf. (Hardback - Germany) 2005.
- Eminem: Dans ma peau. City Editions.(French) Paperback. 2005.
- 2PAC Shakur - Death Rap: Sein Leben als Comic (German) Hardcover. 2006.
- Kurt Cobain El Angel Erraco / Rock Star Biographies:(Spanish) Paperback. 2006.
- Guns and Roses / Tutta La Storia - A Fumetti! (Edition BD - Italy - Hardback) 2015.
- Como disegnare Mostri. Il Castillo (Italian Edicione). 2014.
- Como dibujar Monstrous. Edicione DRAC - (Madrid - pain) 2018.
- Metallica. Novela Grafica. Redbook Ediciones (Barcelona: Spain) 2017.
- Ramones. Novela Grafica. Redbook Ediciones (Barcelona Spain) 2018.
- Guns and Roses. Novela grafica. Redbook Ediciones (Barcelona Spain) 2018.
- Ramones. Graphic Novel. E/P/A Editiones. (France) 2018.
- Bob Marley. Wake Up and Live. E/P/A Editiones. (France) 2018.
- Bob Marley. Wake Up and Live. Redbook Ediciones. (Barcelona.Spain) 2018.
- Sex Pistols. La Novela Grafica. Redbook Ediciones. (Barcelona.Spain) 2019.
- Keith Moon. La Novela Grafica. Redbook Ediciones. (Barcelona.Spain) 2019.
- Godspeed. The Kurt Cobain Graphic.Redbook Ediciones (Barcelona Spain) 2020.
- Novelas Gráficas del Rock: Metallica, Guns N' Roses Y Ramones. Non Troppo: Spain. 2021.

=== Books ===
- Voices of Latin Rock: The People and Events That Created This Sound (with co-author Ron Sansoe, 316 pages, Hal Leonard Corporation, June 2005, ISBN 0-634-08061-X)
- How To Draw Monsters For Kids (Search Press) 2012.
- How To Draw Fantasy Creatures (Search Press) 2015.
- 2000AD Creator Interviews. (2000AD ebooks) 2015.
- Voices Of Latin Rock. The E-Mix. 2017. (Macasso eBooks 1)
- iPhone Images - Volume One (Macasso eBooks 2) 2019.
- iPhone Images - Volume Two (Macasso eBooks 3) 2019.
- Digital Heart (Macasso eBooks 4) 2019.
- Sketch One. (Macasso eBooks 5) 2019.
- Sketch Two (Macasso eBooks 6) 2019.
- Lenny Wirral: Deptford Cowboys. (Macasso eBooks 7) 2019.
- Trapped in Roseland - An Aortic Romance (Macasso eBooks 8) 2020.
- Nobody Loves Jesus Anymore (Macasso eBooks 9) 2020.
- Ditko Volume One. Dark Triad. (Macasso eBooks 10) 2020.
- Ditko Volume Two. The Psychomantheum. (Macasso eBooks 11) 2020.
- Ditko Volume Three. Red Rains Leviathan. (Macasso eBooks 12) 2020.
- HEERO. Graphella One.(Macasso eBooks 13)2020.
- HEERO. Graphella Two.(Macasso eBooks 14)2020.
- HEERO. Graphella Three.(Macasso eBooks 15)2020.
- The 12 Steps. Recovery from Addiction. (Macasso eBooks 16) 2020.
- The Narcissist. (Macasso eBooks 17) 2020.
- ADHD: Addiction and Me. (Macasso eBooks 18) 2020.
- Flowers In The Rain: The Untold Story of The Move. Foreword by Paul Weller. (Wymer Books) 2024.
