= Brett Ewins =

British comic book artist

- Born: 1955 Hammersmith, London, England
- Died: 16 February 2015 (aged 59) Ealing, London, U.K.
- Areas: Penciller, Inker
- Notable works: Bad Company; Deadline; Judge Dredd; Judge Anderson; Rogue Trooper
- Collaborators: Peter Milligan; Jim McCarthy; Brendan McCarthy

Brett Ewins (1955 – 16 February 2015) was a British comic book artist best known for his work on Judge Dredd and Rogue Trooper in the weekly anthology comic 2000 AD.

== Biography ==
Ewins studied Conceptual Art at Goldsmiths College, where he was also taught fine art by Michael Craig-Martin. Ewins met future collaborator Peter Milligan at Goldsmiths, and left in 1977. In 1980, Ewins held a solo exhibition of his work at Frestonia's Car Breaker Gallery in London, a squat in Ladbroke Grove's Republic of Frestonia. Ewins formed a long-term collaborative partnership with fellow artist Brendan McCarthy who also showed at the Car Breaker Gallery, creating the comic Sometime Stories, which faltered after the first issue leaving the second issue completed but unpublished. On the strength of Sometime Stories, Ewins soon started providing covers for 2000 AD, the first being issue #33 published in October of the same year.

Ewins and McCarthy continued working together on Future Shocks and Judge Dredd, but soon after Ewins began working solo on Rogue Trooper and later Judge Anderson. In 1985 Ewins started working on Bad Company, a sci-war epic, written by Peter Milligan with artwork by Ewins and Jim McCarthy (brother of Brendan).

Brett Ewins did the cover art for the Judgement Day (1986) supplement for Games Workshop's Judge Dredd: The Role-Playing Game.

Along with Steve Dillon, he started the comic magazine Deadline in 1988, which continued for another seven years. At the same time as Ewins was starting Deadline, he began working on Skreemer for American comics publisher, DC. Ewins was also still contributing art to 2000 AD at the same time. This level of work was to have a serious impact of Ewins' health.

He "suffered a serious breakdown from overwork" in 1991 and was unable to take on work that had a deadline, which led to lost commissions from DC Comics and Penguin Books. His plan to recover was to create an anthology based on work from friends in the industry like Peter Milligan, Alan Grant and Alan McKenzie, as well as friends like musician Michael White. The volume was finished off with "Machine", a story written by Ewins based on his breakdown. He worked on the stories from 1995 to 2003 and the book was published as The Dark Gate in 2004 by Cyberosia Publishing.

Ewins also was a painter and had a number of exhibitions. Ewins was also an influence on street art, especially The IFC and the Mutoid Waste Company, and a Ewins-influenced exhibition was held in November 2011.

In 2011, Air Pirate Press published a biographical retrospective book of Ewins' life and work, The Art of Brett Ewins (ISBN 095691490X).

In January 2012 it was reported that he had sustained head injuries during a confrontation with police, in which one policeman received stab wounds. He subsequently appeared before Uxbridge Magistrates Court in February 2012 charged with causing grievous bodily harm with intent, and ultimately spent time in prison.

He died on 17 February 2015 from emphysema.

== Bibliography ==
Comics work includes:

- Tharg's Future Shocks:
  - "Robot Repairs" (with writer Robert Flynn and artist Jim McCarthy, in 2000 AD #37-38, 1977)
  - "The Man Who Was Too Clever" (with Peter Milligan, in 2000 AD #216, 1981)
- Judge Anderson:
  - "Four Dark Judges" (with John Wagner and Alan Grant, 2000 AD Progs 416 - 427, 1985)
  - "The Possessed" (with John Wagner and Alan Grant, 2000 AD progs 468 - 478, 1986)
- Judge Dredd:
  - "Bring Me The Head of Judge Dredd!" (with John Wagner, as "John Howard", and sharing art duties Brendan McCarthy, in 2000 AD #88, 1978)
  - "The DNA Man" (with John Wagner, as "John Howard", in 2000 AD #114-115, 1979)
  - "The Haunting of Sector House 9" (with John Wagner, as "T. B. Grover", in 2000 AD #359-363, 1984)
  - "The Wally Squad" (with John Wagner and Alan Grant as "T.B. Grover", in "2000 AD" #390 - 392 (1984)
- ABC Warriors: "The Order of Knights Martial" (with Pat Mills, in 2000 AD #124, 1979)
- Rogue Trooper: "Bagman Blues" (with Gerry Finley-Day, in 2000 AD #261-262, 1982)
- Strange Days #1-3 (with Peter Milligan, Eclipse Comics, 1984–1985)
- The Johnny Nemo Magazine #1-3 (with Peter Milligan, Eclipse Comics, 1985–1986)
- Bad Company (pencils, with Peter Milligan and inks by Jim McCarthy):
  - "Bad Company" (in 2000 AD #500-519, 1986–1987)
  - "The Bewilderness" (in 2000 AD #548-557, 1987–1988)
  - "Young Men Marching" (in 2000AD Annual 1989, 1988)
  - "The Krool Heart" (in 2000 AD #576-585, 1988)
  - "Simply" (in 2000 AD #601, 1988)
  - "Ararat" (in 2000AD Annual 1990, 1989)
  - "Kano" (in 2000 AD #828-837, 1993)
  - "Down Among the Dead Men" (in 2000AD Annual 2001, 2000)
  - "Bad Company 2002" (in 2000 AD Prog 2002 and #1273-1277, 2001–2002)
- Swamp Thing #70 (with Rick Veitch, Vertigo, 1988)
- Hellblazer #7-8 (with Jamie Delano, Vertigo, 1988)
- Skreemer (pencils, with writer Peter Milligan and inks by Steve Dillon, 6-issue limited series, 1989, DC Comics, trade paperback, 169 pages, 2002, ISBN 1-56389-925-6)
- Secret Origins: "Shine On You Crazy Diamond" #23 (with Rick Veitch, DC Comics, February 1988)
- Mr X Special (with Peter Milligan, one-shot, Vortex Comics, 1990)
- Animal Man #44 (with Tom Veitch, Vertigo, 1992)
- The Dark Gate (editor and artist, with Peter Milligan, Alan McKenzie and Alan Grant, 64 pages, Cyberosia Publishing, 2004, ISBN 0-9742713-6-5)

== Awards ==
- 1990: Won "Favourite Single or Continued Story US" Eagle Award, for Skreemer
