= Atomeka Press =

British publisher of comic books

ATOMEKA Press
- Founded: 1988
- Founders: Dave Elliott and Garry Leach
- Headquarters location: London, England
- Key people: Mike Lake

Atomeka Press is a British publisher of comic books set up in 1988 by Dave Elliott and Garry Leach. Atomeka ceased publishing in 1997, was briefly revived from 2002 to 2005 and revived again in 2013.

== History ==
Atomeka was established as a company offering creators complete freedom over their material, as well as the opportunity to own all the rights to their creations. Their first title, A1, was an anthology featuring the likes of Ted McKeever, Alan Moore, Glenn Fabry, and Simon Bisley. Seeing who was involved in the project it was natural that A1 contained some stories that were continuations of Warrior strips such as The Bojeffries Saga and Warpsmith, written by Alan Moore with art by Steve Parkhouse and Garry Leach respectively. During its run A1 won several awards, including the 1990 Harvey Award for best anthology.

During the 1990s, Atomeka continued publishing A1, as well as related specials such as A1: Bikini Confidential. The company also published some of Simon Bisley's creator-owned work during this period, in titles such as Monster Massacre and Heavy Metal. In 1992, Elliott solo-edited a four-issue sequel to A1 in colour for Marvel Comics's Epic Comics imprint.

As Tundra UK's publisher, in 1992 Dave Elliott began using the Atomeka imprint to establish its own identity within the larger company; he was also responsible for titles with all the British comic creators. Elliott brought two titles he started at John Brown Publishing, Lazarus Churchyard and White Trash, with him to complete with Tundra UK/Atomeka.

With Tundra UK's demise in 1993, Elliott started Blackball Comics. In 1997, Atomeka ceased publishing, as Elliott and Leach pursued other projects.

=== 2002 relaunch ===
In 2002 Atomeka was resurrected to publish Simon Bisley's Maximum Force. In 2004 Elliott and Leach resurrected the company, in cooperation with Ross Richie, publishing A1 Big Issue Zero, Bricktop, Mister Monster: Worlds War Three, and Stalkers, featuring a mix of reprint material. Richie generated his own new projects under the Atomeka banner, such as Hero Squared and G.I. Spy as well as new work from the likes of Mike Mignola with Jenny Finn. The team-up didn't last long, as Richie left to form his own company, Boom! Studios, taking Squared, Spy, and Finn with him.

In late 2004 the A1 Sketchbook was released in part by the artist responsible for re-creating Marvelman with Alan Moore, Garry Leach and Atomeka Press. It contained four Marvelman-related pin-ups (although the pin-ups were not directly said to be Marvelman for possible legal reasons). A variant of the sketchbook was also produced, and it featured a Marvelman front cover and Kid Marvelman back cover by Leach.

In 2005 the company published a three-part reissue of Ted McKeever's Eddy Current, and also one (of three planned) "Bojeffries Terror Tomes", reprinting The Bojeffries Saga by Alan Moore and Steve Parkhouse, and featuring additional work by Neil Gaiman and Michael Zulli, Ramsey Campbell and David Lloyd, Michael T. Gilbert and Dave Dorman, Warren Ellis and Steve Pugh, and also including Ted McKeever's Eddy Current and a solo tale of Eddy Current's Nun.

=== 2013 relaunch ===
In 2013 Atomeka relaunched their flagship title A1 in two formats through Titan Books. The first was a six-issue limited series serializing three strips — Carpe Diem, Odyssey, and Weirding Willows — over six months that were collected in 2014. Then came a separate 160-page tome, A1 Volume 1: World's Greatest Comics. Also relaunched at the same time was Monster Massacre, an anthology which features B.E.M. (Bug Eyed Monsters) comics. Monster Massacre is a twice-yearly anthology while A1 is an annual.

== Titles published ==
=== Atomeka 1.0 ===
- A1 (1989)
- A1 True Life Bikini Confidential (1990)
- Bisley's Scrapbook (1993)
- The Bogie Man: Chinatoon (1993)
- Carnosaur Carnage (1993)
- Lazarus Churchyard (1992)
- Ammo Armageddon (1993)
- Monster Massacre (1993)
- Night Vision (1992)
- Sugarvirus (1993)
- SweetMeats (1993)
- White Trash (1992)

=== Atomeka 2.0 ===
- A1 Bojeffries Terror Tome (2005)
- A1 Sketchbook (2004)
- Bricktop A1 Special (2004)
- Dan Norton's Space 1958 (2004)
- The Dave Johnson Sketchbook (2004)
- Eddy Current (2005)
- Hero Squared X-tra Sized Special (2005)
- Jenny Finn: Doom (2005)
- Maximum Force (2002)
- Mr. Monster: Who Watches the Garbagemen? (2005)
- Mr. Monster: Worlds War Two (2004)
- Stalkers (2005)

=== Atomeka 3.0 ===
- A1 (2013)
- A1 Volume 1: World's Greatest Comics (2014)
- Monster Massacre (2014)
