= John Brown Media =

Content marketing agency

- John Brown Media Logo
- Parent company: Dentsu Aegis Network
- Founded: 1 April 1987
- Founder: John Brown
- Headquarters location: 8 Baldwin Street, London EC1V 9NU, United Kingdom
- Publication types: Digital content, apps, social media, mobile, video, catalogues, magazines
- No. of employees: 222
- Official website: www.johnbrownmedia.com

John Brown Media is one of the world's largest content marketing agencies. It was bought by Dentsu Aegis in May 2015. While originally formed as a magazine company, the company creates multichannel content for various brands, with services including social media, film and audio, mobile.

== History ==
Originally based in Ladbroke Grove in London, the company was formed in 1987 by John Brown, who had previously run Virgin Books. The business was launched with two magazines: the adult comic magazine Viz, for which John Brown had secured the rights, and HotAir, Virgin Atlantic's inflight title.

In 1989 John Brown acquired the comics fanzine Speakeasy, converting it to a proper magazine. In mid-1991 it launched the comics magazine Blast!.

While going on to publish several other newsstand titles, however, it was the customer magazine side of the business that grew most dramatically, with early clients including Debenhams, IKEA, the Dorchester, and Eurotunnel. (John Brown shut down both Speakeasy and Blast! by the end of 1991.)

In 2001 the company disposed of its consumer titles (including Viz) in a £6.4 million deal with I Feel Good (IFG), a company belonging to ex-Loaded editor James Brown, to concentrate on customer communications, and quickly absorbed Citrus Publishing. This helped move establish John Brown as the UK's largest customer publishing house.

In 2004, CEO Andrew Hirsch (formerly of Pearl and Dean) initiated a successful management buyout. A broadening of the group's activities and a number of acquisitions followed as did board appointments in marketing and strategy. In 2008 the senior management team restructured all the acquired businesses to trade under the single John Brown banner.

In 2006, specialist catalogue publishing agency CodeLondon was acquired.

In 2007, digital communication agency Fingal was acquired.

In 2007, a South African office was opened in Cape Town.

In 2008, a company rebrand was undertaken with all companies trading under the John Brown name.

In 2011, Hong Kong agency Kleio was acquired and rebranded as John Brown Hong Kong.

In 2013, offices were opened in Dubai, with a US office opened in 2015.

In 2015, John Brown Media joined the Dentsu Aegis Network.
