= The Indestructible Man (comics) =

British comic book story

Mark Dangerfield
- Mark Dangerfield's present-day guise, from "The Indestructible Man" in the 4 May 1968 edition of Jag. Art by Jesús Blasco.

Character information
- First appearance: Jag (4 May 1968)

In-story information
- Full name: Unknown
- Species: Human
- Place of origin: Earth
- Team affiliations: Royal Guard of Ramesses II
- Partnerships: Ned Stoker
- Abilities: Immortality; Invisibility; Enhanced strength Invulnerable skin Elemental transubstantiation Energy bolt projection

Publication information
- Publisher: Fleetway Publications; IPC Magazines
- Schedule: Weekly
- Title(s): Jag; 4 May 1968 to 29 March 1969; Jag Annual; 1971 to 1973
- Formats: Original material for the series has been published as a strip in the comics anthology(s) Jag.
- Publication date: 4 May 1968 – 29 March 1969

Creative team
- Writer(s): Scott Goodall
- Artist(s): Jesús Blasco
- Editor(s): Tony Power

"The Indestructible Man" is a British comic strip published by Fleetway Publications and later IPC Magazines in the boys' comic anthology title Jag between 4 May 1968 to 29 March 1969. Written by Scott Goodall and drawn by Jesús Blasco, the story followed an Ancient Egyptian warrior who survived into the present day after learning a number of skills while entombed, and took on the identity of crime-fighter Mark Dangerfield.

== Creation ==
While most of Fleetway's comics worked on keeping production costs as low as possible, Jag was an experiment in making a higher-quality comic that would emulate the success of Eagle in the 1950s (at the time, Eagle itself was being published by Fleetway's rival Odhams Press, and was considered to be a shadow of itself since contentiously sacking much of the title's original creative team). As a result, it would consist of 16 tabloid-size pages of a higher grade paper, with half of those in colour. Fleetway also assigned many of their best artists to the title, including Joe Colquhoun and Geoff Campion. Jesús Blasco, best known at the time for his influential and popular work on the highly successful "The Steel Claw" in Valiant, was assigned to one of the black-and-white strips. Editor Tony Power paired him with Scott Goodall, who had first worked for Fleetway on romance comic Mirabelle before considerable success writing for TV Century 21 for City Magazines, "Captain Hurricane" for Valiant and "Fishboy" for Buster. Comics professional and expert John Freeman has suggested that the story's name may have been chosen to cash in on the success of Gerry Anderson's 'indestructible' Captain Scarlet, while noting there were no further similarities; he also suggested The Avengers and Blasco's then-recent work on the licensed "Danger Man" strip in Lion influenced the story.

== Publishing history ==
Due to the size of Jag's pages, like most of the features "The Indestructible Man" was only a page long, using a layout of 15-16 frames laid out in five rows. The comic however did not reach Fleetway's high hopes, and its fortunes were also affected by the reorganisation of the company into IPC Magazines, and in February 1969 Jag was reformatted into a standard-size 32-page comic, with "The Indestructible Man" expanded to two pages (using roughly the same number of frames). However, the changes failed to improve sales and a month later Jag was merged with Tiger. "The Indestructible Man" was not one of the serials selected to continue, though new self-contained stories featuring the character would appear in the three Jag Annuals issued between 1971 and 1973. A similar "revived Egyptian" story - "Kid Pharaoh" - would later appear in Valiant between 1973 and 1975.

In 2018, Jag and its contents were purchased from IPC by Rebellion Developments. David McDonald of Irish publisher Hibernia Books subsequently worked with Rebellion to produce an 84-page collected edition of the story, compiling the weekly and annual stories, as part of the company's Fleetway Files reprint series. McDonald chose the story because "it's a great character and the art is amazing". Hibernia had to scan original pages from Jag for the collection, and McDonald revealed the final issues needed weren't sourced on eBay until shortly before the book's print deadline.

== Plot summary ==
The Captain of Rameses II's royal guard is the son of the influential High Priest of Osiris, but returns to Thebes to find his father murdered. Framed by conspirators led by the nobleman Copher, the Captain is sentenced to be entombed alive with his father's body. Inside the pyramid, he finds scrolls of secret knowledge in his father's effects and enters a Sleep of Living Death. He was discovered in 1968 when archaeologists led by Professor Abercombie enter the tomb and have the sarcophagi transported to a British museum. The ship transporting them is targeted by thieves, and the captain awakens. His appearance causes the crooks to scatter, and the captain is able to use his knowledge to turn invisible, bury his father at sea and destroy the secret scrolls. He slips ashore and decides to settle as Mark Dangerfield, using his transubstantiation powers to create gold and buying an isolated mansion in Cursiter Fields. Dangerfield finds he needs periodic renewal in flame to prevent sudden aging, and recruits would-be burglar Ned Stoker as his assistant. Satisfied to find in history books that Copher's treachery was discovered and justice was done, he sets his abilities to fighting crime in the present day - battling amoral arms dealer Jasper Shackleton; would-be crime lord Jabez van Zatt; art thief the Black Avenger; the animal-controlling Skin Men and robotics genius the Badger.

== Collected editions ==
Title	ISBN	Publisher	Release date	Contents
The Indestructible Man	N/A	Hibernia Books	June 2021	Material from Jag 4 May 1968 to 29 March 1969 and Jag Annual 1971 to 1973.

== Reception ==
Graham Kibble-White described the story as one of the "highlights" of Jag, while Lew Stringer described it as "offbeat and exciting".

Despite acknowledging the serial nature of the story would not be to the taste of modern audiences (particularly what he called "clunky" captions), John Freeman felt the story "shined through" and was an "overlooked gem", while noting the protagonist could be classed as a rare example of the British superhero from the period. ComicsScene's Comics Guy felt similarly, praising Blasco's art but feeling the annual stories were less successful, and lauded Hibernia's production of the collected edition.
