= Barbara Baraldi =

Italian mystery and fantasy writer

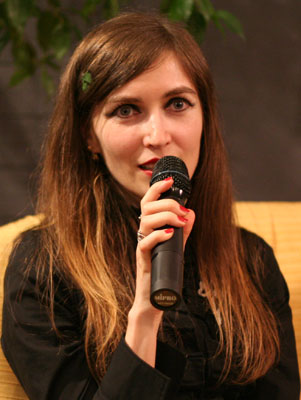
Barbara Baraldi

Barbara Baraldi is an Italian mystery and fantasy writer.

== Biography ==
A native of Mirandola, she currently lives near Modena. Her debut novel is La ragazza dalle ali di serpente, published in 2007, under the pseudonym of Luna Lanzoni. As a noir fiction writer she received, for two consecutive years, the Marco Casacci Prizes with two short stories: "Dorothy non vuole morire" and "La sindrome felicità repulsiva". For her short novel Una storia da rubare she won the Premio Gran Giallo Città di Cattolica.

At the end of 2007 she published the novel La collezionista di sogni infranti (PerdisaPop) in a book series by Luigi Bernardi. Two of her novels, La bambola dagli occhi di cristallo and Il giardino dei bambini perduti, were published in 2008 by Mondadori on Il Giallo Mondadori Presenta. In 2009 she published the novel La casa di Amelia (PerdisaPop), a sequel to her previous work for the book series by Luigi Bernardi. The novel La casa dagli specchi rotti came out at the end of 2009 in an anthology inspired by the cinematographic Italian Giallo of Dario Argento published by Mondadori on Il Giallo Mondadori. In the first months of 2010 they are published two novels: Bambole pericolose on Il Giallo Mondadori and Lullaby - La ninna nanna della morte (Castelvecchi). In May 2010 Mondadori published her first urban fantasy novel in Italy: called Scarlett, it is set in Tuscany.

Her novel The Girl with the Crystal Eyes, published in the UK by John Blake Publishing, was well received by British critics

== Selected works ==
=== Works published in Britain ===
- The Girl with the Crystal Eyes (John Blake Publishing, 2010) ISBN 978-1-84454-930-6

=== Novels published in Italy ===
- La ragazza dalle ali di serpente (Zoe, 2007)
- La collezionista di sogni infranti (PerdisaPop, 2007)
- La bambola dagli occhi di cristallo (Mondadori, 2008)
- Il giardino dei bambini perduti (Mondadori, 2008)
- La casa di Amelia (PerdisaPop, 2009)
- Bambole pericolose (Mondadori, 2010)
- Lullaby, la ninna nanna della morte (Castelvecchi, 2010)
- Scarlett (Mondadori, 2010)
- Aurora nel buio (Giunti, 2017)
- Osservatore oscuro (Giunti, 2018)
- L'ultima notte di Aurora (Giunti, 2019)
- La stagione dei ragni (Giunti, 2021)
- Cambiare le ossa (Giunti, 2022)
- Gli omicidi dei tarocchi (Giunti, 2025)

=== Short novels published in Italy ===
- Una storia da rubare (2007, short novel serialized in Il Giallo Mondadori Presenta n.9)
- Dorothy non vuole morire (2007, short novel in the anthology Anonima assassini: I delitti di Orme Gialle)
- Attrazione letale (2007, short novel published in the anthology Gli occhi dell'Hydra)
- La sindrome felicità repulsiva (2008, short novel published in the anthology Anonima assassini 2: I delitti di Orme Gialle)
- Soave (2008, short novel serialized in Il Giallo Mondadori Presenta)
- Le bambole non uccidono (2009, short novel serialized in Epix Mondadori n.5: Bad prisma)
- La casa dagli specchi rotti (2009)
