= Classical Comics =

British publishing company

Classical Comics Enterprises
- Founded: 2007
- Founder: Clive Bryant
- Country of origin: United Kingdom
- Headquarters location: Birmingham
- Distribution: Combined Book Services (UK); Publishers Group West (US); Cengage (Australia)
- Key people: Gary Bryant
- Publication types: Graphic novels
- Fiction genres: literary adaptations
- No. of employees: 240
- Official website: Official website

Classical Comics is a British publisher of graphic novel adaptations of the great works of literature, including Shakespeare, Charlotte Brontë and Dickens.

== Overview ==
All of the volumes will be published as graphic novels. Art is being provided by British artists, most of whom have a long history of working in British comics. Some of the releases, in particular the Shakespeare, will come in three different versions: the original text, plain text and quick text, designed to allow readers with different needs to pick the version that bests suits them.

Classical Comics chairman, Clive Bryant has stated "We want to make Shakespeare as energetic and colourful as Spider-man" The aim is not just to aid in English literature classes but also in other areas: Karen Wenborn, the managing director, has said "We, and the teachers we’ve consulted, can visualize huge benefits within the education process using the books, not only for literacy and literature, but also drama, art and history."

In April 2008 Classical Comics signed a distribution deal with book&volume to cover Australia and New Zealand. In June 2008 they announced two further distributions deals. Publishers Group West will be releasing British English and American English versions of Classical Comics' titles in the US and Canada and Ittosha are going to be translating the books into Japanese.

Classical Comics are also adapting their comics into other media and have turned their Macbeth graphic novel into an interactive motion comic with actors like Derek Jacobi and Juliet Stevenson voicing the roles. Jon Haward, the artist on Macbeth and The Tempest, moved into the role of art direction for the Hamlet adaptation, providing character designs and rough page outlines for pencilled David Lorenzo to work with.

== Reception ==
The National Association for the Teaching of English is supporting the project. "This is a fun way of getting into the stories", the director Ian McNeilly said. "Plays are not meant to be read, but to be seen. The illustrations in these books are an easy way of following what is going on". Wenborn has also reported that focus groups were "incredibly enthusiastic" and The Guardian, who examined the version of MacBeth, has suggested that "it will also, surely, suck some more young readers into the brilliant darkness of this play."

== Titles ==
- Henry V (by William Shakespeare and adapted by John McDonald, with pencils by Neill Cameron and inks by Bambos, 144 pages, November 2007, Original Text, ISBN 978-1-906332-00-6)
- Macbeth (by William Shakespeare and adapted by John McDonald with artwork by Jon Haward, 144 pages, February 2008, Original Text, ISBN 978-1-906332-03-7)
- Romeo and Juliet (by William Shakespeare and adapted by John McDonald with artwork by Will Volley and Jim Devlin, 160 pages, September 2009, Original Text, ISBN 978-1-906332-19-8)
- The Tempest (by William Shakespeare and adapted by John McDonald with artwork by Jon Haward, 144 pages, September 2009 Original Text, ISBN 978-1-906332-29-7
- A Midsummer Night's Dream (by William Shakespeare and adapted by John McDonald with artwork by Jason Cardy & Kat Nicholson, 144 pages, September 2010 Original Text, ISBN 978-1-906332-89-1)
- Jane Eyre (by Charlotte Brontë and adapted by Amy Corzine with artwork by John Burns, 144 pages, Spring 2008, Original Text, ISBN 978-1-906332-06-8)
- Frankenstein (by Mary Shelley and adapted by Jason Cobley with artwork by Declan Shalvey, 144 pages, September 2008 Original Text, ISBN 978-1-906332-15-0)
- A Christmas Carol (by Charles Dickens and adapted by Sean Michael Wilson, with pencils by Mike Collins and inks by David Roach, 160 pages, October 2008, Original Text, ISBN 978-1-906332-17-4)
- Great Expectations (by Charles Dickens and adapted by Jen Green and artwork by John Stokes, 160 pages, March 2009, Original Text, ISBN 978-1-906332-09-9)
- The Canterville Ghost (by Oscar Wilde and adapted by Sean Michael Wilson, with art by Steve Bryant and Jason Millet, 136 pages, February 2010, Original Text, ISBN 978-1-906332-27-3)
- Sweeney Todd (by anonymous and adapted by Sean Michael Wilson, with art by Declan Shalvey, 168 pages, November 2010, Original Text, ISBN 978-1-906332-79-2)
- Wuthering Heights (by Emily Brontë and adapted by Sean Michael Wilson, with art by John M. Burns, 160 pages, August 2010, Original Text, ISBN 978-1-906332-87-7)
- Dracula (by Bram Stoker and adapted by Jason Cobley with artwork by Staz Johnson, colours by James Offredi and lettering by Jim Campbell, 152 pages, Original Text, ISBN 978-1-906332-25-9)
- An Inspector Calls (by J. B. Priestley and adapted by Jason Cobley with artwork by Will Volley, colours by Alejandro Sanchez and lettering by Jim Campbell, 144 pages, Original Text, ISBN 978-1-906332-32-7)
- The Importance of Being Earnest (by Oscar Wilde. Script adaptation, characters and artwork by John Stokes, 144 pages, Original Text, ISBN 978-1-906332-92-1, Quick Text, ISBN 978-1-906332-93-8)

== Awards ==
- 2008:
  - Won the Silver Medal "Graphic Novel/Drawn Book – Drama/Documentary" Independent Publisher Book Award, for Henry V.
- 2009:
  - Won the Bronze Medal "Graphic Novel/Drawn Book – Drama/Documentary" Independent Publisher Book Award, for Macbeth.
  - Association of Educational Publishers 2009 Winner - Distinguished Achievement Award in grades 9-12 'Frankenstein'
- 2010
  - Romeo & Juliet graphic novels win "Distinguished Achievement Award" for Curriculum, Reading and Language Arts, grades 9–12.
- 2012:
  - 'Wuthering Heights' by Scottish writer Sean Michael Wilson, and hand painted by comic book veteran artist John M Burns, received a nomination for the Stan Lee Excelsior Awards, 2012 voted for by pupils from 170 schools across the UK.
  - Finalist in the Education Resources Awards 2012 for Best Secondary Resource or Equipment - involving ICT Macbeth Interactive Motion Comic

== See also ==
- Classic Comics, the fore-runner of Classics Illustrated
- Classics Illustrated, a similar venture from the 1940s to 1960s
- Marvel Illustrated, Marvel Comics imprint adapting classic literature
- PAICO Classics, Indian series similar to Classics Illustrated
- Self Made Hero, another new British company producing adaptations of literature, including some of the same Shakespeare plays
- Les Grands Classiques de la littérature en bande dessinée – French series of classics adaptations, published in 2017–2018 and incorporating titles from two previous series
- The Manga Bible, an adaptation by Siku
