= Fishboy =

Fishboy may refer to:

- Fishboy (band), an American indie pop band from Denton, Texas
- Fishboy (comic), a British comic story
- In the horror movie House of 1000 Corpses, Fishboy is the title given by the character Otis B. Driftwood for his sadistic sculpture, which combines the upper body of a human with a large fish tail.
