= David Peel =

David Peel may refer to:

- David Peel (actor) (1920–1981), British film actor
- David Peel (musician) (1942–2017), New York underground rock musician
