= Jet-Ace Logan =

British comic strip

- Jet-Ace Logan from Tiger, 1961, drawn by Brian Lewis.
- Author: Mike Butterworth; David Motton, Kenneth Bulmer, Frank S. Pepper
- Illustrator(s): Geoff Campion, John Gillat, Brian Lewis, Ron Turner, Francisco Solano López, Kurt Caesar
- Current status/schedule: Concluded
- Launch date: 1956
- End date: 1968
- Publisher(s): The Comet; Tiger; Thriller Picture Library
- Genre: Adventure

Jet-Ace Logan was a British comic strip that appeared in The Comet (1956–1959) and Tiger (1959–1968), Thriller Picture Library, and the 1969 and 1972 Tiger Annuals.

== Publication history ==
Mike Butterworth created Jet-Ace Logan. He scripted the first adventure, which was drawn by Geoff Campion, and published in The Comet. All subsequent adventures (approximately 20 in all) appearing in The Comet were scripted by David Motton, and drawn by John Gillat. Motton also scripted Jet-Ace Logan stories for Thriller Picture Library — namely "Times Five", "Seven Went To Sirius," and "Ten Days To Doom."

Other writers contributing scripts included David Motton, Kenneth Bulmer, and Frank S. Pepper; other artists illustrated the character's adventures, including Brian Lewis, Ron Turner, Francisco Solano López, and Kurt Caesar.

== Fictional character biography ==
The hero, Jim "Jet-Ace" Logan, was an ace interplanetary pilot of the RAF; stories were set about 100 years in the future (for example, the story in the 1963 Tiger Annual is set in 2063). In all but the earliest stories, his regular copilot, Plum-Duff (sometimes Plumduff) Charteris, accompanied Jet-Ace.

In later stories, Jet-Ace and Plumduff belonged to various law enforcement agencies, such as the Solar Police rather than military organizations.

== Sources ==
- Tiger Annual, 1963.
- Tiger Annual, 1968.
- Tiger Annual, 1969.
