= Jag (comics) =

British former weekly comic

- The cover of Jag from 22 June 1968.

Publication information
- Publisher: IPC/Fleetway Publications
- Schedule: Weekly
- Format: Ongoing series
- Genre: Action/adventure
- Publication date: 4 May 1968 – 29 March 1969
- No. of issues: 48

Creative team
- Artist(s): Jesús Blasco; Eric Bradbury; Geoff Campion; Joe Colquhoun
- Editor: Tony Power

Jag (Note: Sometimes referred to as JAG due to the uppercase masthead) was a weekly British comics periodical published by Fleetway Publications and IPC Magazines from 4 May 1968 to 29 March 1969. A boys' adventure comic, the title lasted for 48 editions before being merged with another title, the long-established Tiger.

== Creation ==
Jag - named after the big cat jaguar to complement the existing IPC boys' comics Lion and Tiger - was an attempt by the company to sell a higher quality production comic. Much like the Eagle (at the time being published by rival Odhams Press), Jag featured glossy photogravure printing for the covers and centre pages, compared to the four-colour newsprint paper stock used for the covers other weeklies; it also included four further interior four-colour pages. The printing was undertaken by Steel Bros. of Carlisle. The new title would also attempt to stand out by using a tabloid size of 11.75 x 15 inches for the pages, larger than the 9.25 x 11.25 inches of their standard comics. As a result, it would contain 16 pages, around half the size of its stablemates; this allowed Jag to be sold at the same price of 7d as Fleetway's other regular titles.

Content was of the typical makeup of boys' weeklies of the time, though strips were typically allotted a single oversized page each, using between 12 and 15 frames. Front cover strip "New World for Old" blended war and fantasy; set in 3209 it featured a society in schism between factions modelled on different Earth time periods. With art by Jesús Blasco, "The Indestructible Man" was another fantastical story, starring an ancient Egyptian who had been entombed alive and used lost knowledge to cheat death, among other superhuman skills. World War II thrills were provided by "The Mouse Patrol", telling the story of three boys who set out to free their prisoner-of-war fathers in North Africa, with the aid of a monkey and an abandoned tank; the serial was drawn by Eric Bradbury. Geoff Campion provided both the painted centre page fictionalised biography story "Custer" and football story "The Penalty Area", while Joe Colquhoun contributed nautical humour cartoon "Cap'n Codsmouth". Colquhoun would also draw sport story "Football Family Robinson", which rapidly displaced "New World for Old" from the front cover and was written by Tom Tully.

== Publishing history ==
Issues were released on Saturdays, and the first issue included Bobby Moore's Book of the World Cup as a free gift, with a two part Soccer '68 wallchart distributed with the second and third issues. Spin-offs included the Jag Annual and the Jag Football Special.

While Jag survived the 22-week "hatch, match and dispatch" period intact, from 22 February 1969 it was reformatted into a 32-page standard format comic, albeit retaining higher quality paper. To fill the increased pages, additional stories joined the line-up, including Western "The Boy Bandit" (drawn by Tom Kerr) and war story "MacTavish and O'Toole". However the changes were not enough for the comic to survive and the 29 March 1969 edition promised "exciting news for all readers", announcing the title would be merged into Tiger. At the time Fleetway were undergoing considerable upheaval as they and Odhams were reconfigured into IPC Magazines; cartoonist and comics historian Lew Stringer has speculated that Jag might have been cancelled as much to make room in the company's portfolio for other titles as for particularly poor sales. Regardless, Jag was the final new title launched under the Fleetway brand.

"Custer", "MacTavish and O'Toole", "Castaways of Shark Island", "Black Patch the Wonder Horse" and "Football Family Robinson" all survived into Tiger, where the latter especially would enjoy a long continued run. The Jag Annual would continue to run until 1972, notching up four editions.

In 2018 Rebellion Developments were able to complete their purchase of the AP/Fleetway/IPC comic library, giving them rights to Jag and its contents.

== Stories ==
=== Black Patch the Wonder Horse ===
Published: 22 February to 29 March 1969
Artist: Sandy James, David Sque

Stable boy Davey Tyler buys a fast horse called Black Patch from a mysterious gypsy, and plans to use the steed as a champion racer and save Garsdale Racing Stables from financial trouble.

- Continued in Tiger.

=== Boy Bandit ===
Published: 27 July 1968 to 29 March 1969
Artists: Tom Kerr, Selby Donnison

After his father is imprisoned by government forces during the Mexican Revolution, Pepe Churro sets out to enlist the aid of Pancho Villa to help free him.

=== Cap'n Codsmouth ===
Published: 4 May to 12 October 1968
Artists: Joe Colquhoun, Douglas Maxted

The incompetent Captain Codsmouth and his equally idiotic crew try to carry out freight runs in the S.S. Scuttlebutt.

=== Castaways of Shark Island ===
Published: 22 February to 29 March 1969

A class from the Atelco Oil Company's special school in England are shipwrecked on a Pacific Ocean cruise to Singapore, and must work together to survive on a desert island.

- Reprinted from Tiger.

=== Custer ===
Published: 4 May 1968 to 29 March 1969
Artists: Geoff Campion, Colin Page, David Sque

In 1866, George Armstrong Custer arrives at Fort Riley to take command of the 7th Cavalry Regiment.

- Continued in Tiger.

=== Football Family Robinson ===
Published: 27 July 1968 to 29 March 1969
Writer: Tom Tully
Artist: Joe Colquhoun

Thatcher United would be an average unremarkable lower Division Four side but for the bizarre nature that their entire squad and staff are all part of the massive extended Robinson family, who must try to keep the club from falling into the hands of local businessman Max Sharkey and his plans to turn their ramshackle ground into a supermarket.

- The strip took over the front and back covers on its debut and remained there until Jag folded. Continued in Tiger.

=== Ghouldilocks ===
Published: 19 October 1968 to 15 February 1969
Artists: Graham Allen

Being dead doesn't stop a mischievous young girl from terrorising local grown-ups from beyond the grave.

- The character later returned in Shiver and Shake.

=== The Indestructible Man ===
Published: 4 May 1968 to 29 March 1969
Writer: Scott Goodall
Artists: Jesús Blasco

The captain of Ramesses II's royal cavalry is betrayed by Copher, the evil High Priest of Anubis, who murders his father and manipulates the pharaoh to be entomb the captain alive with his late father. However, inside he finds sacred scrolls which teach him numerous parahuman traits, including immortality, immunity to fire, becoming able to transform elements and the ability to fire bolts of energy from his fingers. Freed by archaeologists in the present day, he sets himself up as the heroic adventurer Mark Dangerfield.

- The story was collected in a trade paperback by Irish publisher Hibernia Comics as part of their Fleetway Files series in 2021.

=== Iron Man Martin ===
Published: 23 November 1968 to 29 March 1969
Artists: John Stokes

After being mocked and bullied during a trial for crack youth side Peel Street Rovers, spindly Billy Martin resolves to transform himself into a powerhouse so he can play for Newpool United and England.

=== MacTavish and O'Toole ===
Published: 11 January to 29 March 1969
Artists: Geoff Campion, Alan Philpott

Two Commando sergeants, Scotsman MacTavish and Irishman O'Toole, fight Germans while constantly bickering.

- Continued in Tiger.

=== Micky the Mimic ===
Published: 22 February 1968 to 29 March 1969
Artists:

A young boy puts his skill at reproducing noises to use playing pranks.

- Cartoon strip, modified reprints of "Hi Fi Sid" from Radio Fun, previously printed in Buster.

=== The Mouse Patrol ===
Published: 4 May 1968 to 4 January 1969
Artists: Eric Bradbury

After their fathers' unit is overran by the Afrika Korps, three boys - Blackie Knight, Ginger Hobb, and Cyril North - and their pet monkey Cleopatra hijack a M3 Stuart and set out into the desert to find them.

=== New World for Old ===
Published: 25 May to 16 November 1968

Space policemen taking felons to a prison in 3209 are drawn into a vortex and emerge on an Earth-like planet in a state of internecine war, with each faction seemingly modelling themselves on a different period of Earth history.

- Ran on the full colour cover from its debut until 20 July 1968, when it switched to the interior.

=== The Penalty Area ===
Published: 4 May to 20 July 1968
Artist: Geoff Campion

Star centre forward Tony Marsden unexpectedly returns from playing in Italy to help out hometown team Bradfield Town, struggling in the Football League Third Division. However, his plan is complicated by the arrival of his identical twin brother Tom, on the run from Canadian police. Tony reluctantly agrees to help hide his brother while he clears his name with the pair swapping places when the situation requires - though Tom's dearth of footballing ability begins to raise questions when he has to take Tony's place on the pitch.

=== Snob College ===
Published: 4 May 1968 to 29 March 1969

Young schoolmaster Owen Jenkin earns a post at the prestigious Weeton College, but finds both the pupils and his fellow staff look down on him due to his working class background in a Welsh mining village.

=== Thunder Bill ===
Published: 4 May to 20 July 1968
Artists: John Stokes, Eric Parker

Demolitions expert Bill Thunderhead's skill and enjoyment of his work with explosives soon earns him the nickname 'Thunder Bill'.

=== The Vanishing Champions ===
Published: 22 February to 29 March 1969

A cohort of the world's finest athletes are kidnapped by a mysterious figure known as The General and forced to compete against each other on a hidden island.

- Modified reprints of "Athletes of Lost Island" from Buster.
