= John M. Burns =

English comics artist (1938–2023)

- Born: 1938 Essex, England
- Died: 29 December 2023 (aged 84–85)
- Area: Artist
- Notable works: The Seekers; Danielle; Modesty Blaise; Zetari; Nikolai Dante; The Bendatti Vendetta
- Awards: Society of Strip Illustration Adventure Artist/Newspaper Strip Artist of the Year (x3); UK Comic Art Award Career Achievement Award, 1993; Eagle Awards 30th Anniversary Award for Outstanding Achievements in British Comics, 2007

Burns art from the Nikolai Dante strip

John M. Burns (1938 – 29 December 2023) was an English comics artist, with a career stretching back to the late 1950s.

== Biography ==
His initial work was as an illustrator for Junior Express and School Friend. He also worked on the "Wrath of the Gods" in Boys' World.

Later in the 1960s, Burns worked on TV Century 21 and its sister magazines, including the Space Family Robinson series in Lady Penelope.

For a while he drew daily comics strips for newspapers The Daily Sketch, The Daily Mirror and The Sun, including The Seekers, Danielle and, for a period succeeding Enrique Romero during 1978–79, Modesty Blaise.

Burns moved on to illustrate TV tie-in strips for Look-in, always scripted by Angus Allan. He also worked on the title story for Countdown.

Burns was already well known by the start of the 1980s, but it was when he made the crossover to 2000 AD (along with fellow Look-in alumni Jim Baikie and Arthur Ranson) that his position in British comics was cemented.

In 1991 Burns began by working on Judge Dredd. By his own admission, Burns did not enjoy drawing science fiction strips, and the uniform of Judge Dredd he found unpleasant to draw. However, in 2007 Burns began working on Nikolai Dante, another science fiction strip.

Burns co-created (with Robbie Morrison) a contemporary adventure strip, The Bendatti Vendetta, for the Judge Dredd Megazine; this was rare for the title in having no science fiction or fantasy elements at all.

In 2008, he finished an adaptation of Charlotte Brontë's Jane Eyre, whose script was rendered by Amy Corzine, for UK publisher Classical Comics. He previously worked on similar adaptions of Lorna Doone by R. D. Blackmore and, later, Wuthering Heights by Brontë's sister Emily.

In October 2023 he announced his retirement. He died in a hospital on 29 December 2023.

His new series Nightmare, New York, for 2000 AD, was published posthumously in 2024.

== Bibliography ==
| Title | Publication/Publisher | Year |
|---|---|---|
| Various strips | Girls' Crystal, School Friend, Junior Express | 1954–1957 |
| Champion the Wonder Horse Annual | Daily Mirror | 1958 |
| Victor Glory and the French Armada | Express Super Colour Annual | 1959 |
| Guardian of the Reef | Express Super Colour Annual | 1960 |
| Rev's Ransom | Express Weekly | 1961 |
| Wulf The Briton | Express Weekly | 1961 |
| Educational book illustrations | Oxford Press | 1961–1963 |
| Frontier Circus Annual | Purnell | 1962 |
| Laramie Annual | Purnell | 1963 |
| Wuthering Heights | Diana | 1963–1964 |
| Wrath of the Gods | Boy's World / Eagle and Boy's World Annual 1965 1967 | 1963–1964, 1964, 1966 |
| The White Mile | Diana | 1964 |
| Kelpie the Boy Wizard | Wham and Wham Annual 1966 | 1964, 1965 |
| Laramie Annual | Dean and Son | 1964 |
| Champion the Wonder Horse Annual | Daily Mirror | 1964, 1965 |
| Circus Boy Annual | Daily Mirror | 1964, 1965 |
| The Silent One | Diana For Girls Book 1965 | 1964 |
| Steve and Susan | Gibbs Ivory Castle Arrow | 1965 |
| Roving Reporter | Eagle | 1965 |
| Bids for Freedom | Eagle | 1965 |
| The Bronte Sisters - Stars of the Lonely Moor | Diana | 1965 |
| Great Expectations | Diana | 1965 |
| The Magic Doll | Robin | 1965 |
| The Runaway Princess | Robin | 1965 |
| The World Beyond | Diana For Girls Book 1966 | 1965 |
| The Sea Kings Island | Robin | 1966 |
| The Magic Coffee Mill | Robin | 1966 |
| Lorna Doone | Diana | 1966 |
| Space Family Robinson | Lady Penelope and Summer Extra | 1966 |
| Catch or Kill | TV21 | 1966–1967 |
| The Tuckwells | Sunday Citizen | 1966 |
| The Pickwick Papers | Sunday Citizen | 1966 |
| Edgar Allan Poe Stories | Sunday Citizen | 1966 |
| The Wonder Girl | Diana For Girls Book 1967 | 1966 |
| The Seekers | Daily Sketch | 1966–1971 |
| Horse Laughs | Girl's World Annual 1968 | 1967 |
| Front Page | TV21 | 1967 |
| Lady Penelope | Lady Penelope | 1967 |
| Bonnie and Clyde | Titbits | 1967 |
| Vision in the Night | June and School Friend | 1969 |
| Flying Fay | June and School Friend | 1969 |
| Girl from Space | Daily Mirror Book for Girls 1970 | 1969 |
| Romance Comics | Newnes | 1960s |
| Illustrations | World of Wonder | 1970 |
| Illustrations | Treasure | 1970 |
| True Stories of the Wild Frontier | June and School Friend | 1970 |
| Children of the Stars | Treasure | 1970 |
| Strange Stories | Evening News | 1970 |
| Glory Knight, Time Travel Courier | June and June Book 1972 and 1973 | 1970–1971 |
| Countdown | Countdown and Countdown Special 1971 | 1971–1972 |
| The Justice of Justine | Sally Annual 1972 | 1971 |
| UFO | TV Action | 1972 |
| Mission : Impossible | TV Action | 1972 |
| Danielle | Evening News | 1973–1974, 1978 |
| The Tomorrow People | Look-In and Look-in Annual 1976 | 1973–1976 |
| Kung Fu | Look-In Annual 1974 | 1974 |
| The Amazing Adventures of Havoc Super Agent | Havoc Super Agent Doll – Daisy - strips on rear of packaging and illustrations on front | 1974 |
| Space 1999 | Look-In and Space 1999 Annual | 1975 |
| The Car that lived Twice | AA Drive New Year magazine | 1975 |
| Doctor Who | TV Comic Annual 1976 | 1975 |
| Police Woman | Daisy Doll – strips on rear of packaging and illustrations on front | 1976 |
| The Bionic Woman | Look-In | 1976–1977 |
| Damocles | Evening News | 1977 |
| Matt Marriott | Evening News | 1977 |
| George and Lynne | The Sun | 1977–1984 |
| How the West was Won | Look-In | 1978–1979 |
| Modesty Blaise | Evening Standard | 1978–1979 |
| The Deer Hunter (heading illustrations) | Reveille | 1978 |
| Sweeney 2 (heading illustrations) | Reveille | 1978 |
| Amsterdam Kill (heading illustrations) | Reveille | 1978 |
| The Wild Geese (heading illustrations) | Reveille | 1978 |
| George and Jane | National Girobank Campaign | 1970s |
| Tableaux Illustrations | Palladium Cellars, London | 1980 |
| Smithie | Evening News | 1980 |
| Smuggler | Look-In | 1981 |
| The Royals | The Sun | 1981 |
| Buck Rogers | Look-In | 1981–1982 |
| Call for the Dead | Best Sellers - Viaduct | 1982 |
| A Murder of Quality | Best Sellers – Viaduct | 1982 |
| The Quiller Memorandum | Best Sellers – Viaduct | 1982 |
| The Bridge over the River Kwai | Best Sellers – Viaduct | 1982 |
| Magnum | Look-In | 1982 |
| Eartha | News of the World Sunday magazine | 1982 |
| Modesty Blaise | Best Sellers - Viaduct | 1983 |
| Background artwork for Terrahawks promotional brochure | Anderson-Burr Productions | 1983 |
| The Fists of Danny Pyke | Eagle | 1983–1985 |
| Zetari | 2 volumes – European albums – various languages | 1984, 1986 |
| Modesty Blaise book covers | Titan | 1984–1990 |
| Magazine covers | Investors Chronicle | 1985 |
| Jane | Daily Mirror | 1985–1990 |
| The Tripods | Beeb | 1985 |
| Story so far (Bryan Robson) | Look-In | 1985 |
| Dolebusters | Eagle | 1986 |
| Nationwide Christmas Figures for shop display windows | Top Shop | 1986 |
| Espers | Eclipse | 1987 |
| Julia / Lilly | Bild | 1987–1989 |
| Flat Mates | Sunday People (Go magazine) | 1987 |
| Modesty Blaise Swedish book covers | Berghs | 1987–1991 |
| The Polpots | North Cornwall Chronicle | 1989 |
| Dan Dare | Eagle | 1990–1991 |
| 6 x Modesty (Pieces of Modesty) illustrations | Berghs | 1991 |
| Love Gamble | The Sun | 1991 |
| Captain Trueno | 2 volumes – European – various languages | 1991, 1992 |
| Judge Dredd | 2000AD and Judge Dredd Megazine | 1991–2013 |
| Wild Cards - Borderlines | Epic : An Anthology 4 | 1992 |
| Doctor Sin - The Strange Case of the Wyndham Demon | 2000AD Action Special | 1992 |
| Girl Chat | Daily Mirror | 1993–1995 |
| James Bond – A Silent Armageddon (only 2 issues of an intended 4 were published) | Acme (Dark Horse) | 1993 |
| Doctor Who – Age of Chaos | Marvel UK | 1994 |
| Psycops | The Sun | 1995–1998 |
| Vector 13 | 2000AD | 1996 |
| Black Light | 2000AD | 1996 |
| Abducted by Aliens | Penthouse Comix | 1996 |
| Deadlier than the Male | Penthouse Comix | 1997 |
| Witch World | 2000AD | 1997 |
| Nikolai Dante | 2000AD | 1999–2012 |
| Dracula | Vampires – Informania | 2000 |
| The Bendatti Vendetta | Judge Dredd Megazine | 2002–2005 |
| The Scarlet Apocrypha | Judge Dredd Megazine | 2002 |
| Sable and Fortune | Marvel | 2006 |
| Jane Eyre | Classical Comics | 2008 |
| Wuthering Heights | Classical Comics | 2011 |
| Angel Zero | 2000AD | 2011 |
| Sinister Dexter | Judge Dredd Megazine | 2013 |
| Lady Penelope | TV21 | 2014 |
| Various sexy spy stories | Heavy Metal | 2014–2015 |
| The Order | 2000AD | 2014–2023 |
| The Spirit | The Spirit of Eisner | 2017 |

- Judge Dredd:
  - "Garbage Disposal" (with Garth Ennis, in 2000 AD #738, 1991)
  - "Twilight's Last Gleaming" (with Garth Ennis, in 2000 AD #754–756, 1991)
  - "The Art of Geomancy" (with Alan Grant, in 2000 AD #762–765, 1991–92)
  - "Raider" (with Garth Ennis, in 2000 AD #810–814, 1992)
  - "Virtual Unreality" (with John Wagner, in 2000 AD Yearbook 1994, 1993)
  - "Part Exchange" (with Dan Abnett, in 2000 AD #903, 1994)
  - "The Exterminator" (first two episodes, with John Wagner, in 2000 AD #919–920, 1994)
  - "Horror House" (with John Wagner, in 2000 AD Winter Special, 1994)
  - "Statue of Judgement" (with John Wagner, in 2000 AD #954, 1995)
  - "The Cal Files" (with John Wagner, in 2000 AD #959–963, 1995)
  - "Lonesome Dave" (with John Wagner, in 2000 AD #1031–1032, 1997)
  - "Holiday Special" (with John Wagner, in 2000 AD #1053, 1997)
  - "Sleaze" (with John Wagner, in Judge Dredd Megazine vol. 3 #40, 1998)
  - "Stone Killer" (with John Wagner, in Judge Dredd Megazine vol. 3 #43, 1998)
  - "The Scorpion Dance" (with John Wagner, in 2000 AD #1125–1132, 1998–99)
  - "Cheating Drokkers" (with Robbie Morrison, in 2000 AD #1272, 2001)
  - "Bad Manners" (with John Wagner, in Judge Dredd Megazine vol. 4 #4, 2001)
  - "First Blood" (with Alan Grant, in 2000 AD #1277, 2002)
  - "Necrophage" (with Gordon Rennie, in Judge Dredd Megazine vol. 4 #11, 2002)
  - "Revenge of the Chief Judge's Man" (with John Wagner, in 2000 AD #1342–1349, 2003)
  - "Bite Fight!" (with John Smith, in Judge Dredd Megazine #224–225, 2004)
  - "Master of Fear" (with Alan Grant, in 2000 AD #1375–77, 2004)
  - "All is Bright" (with Michael Carroll, in Judge Dredd Megazine #331, 2013)
  - "Sealed" (with Michael Carroll, in 2000 AD #1816, 2013)
  - "Shotgun" (with Michael Carroll, in Judge Dredd Megazine #335, 2013)
  - "Ferals" (with Emma Beeby, in 2000 AD #1858–61, 2013)
- Doctor Sin: "The Strange Case of the Wyndham Demon" (with John Smith, in 2000 AD Action Special, 1992)
- Black Light: "Survivor Syndrome" (with Dan Abnett/Steve White, in 2000 AD #1001–1005, 1996)
- Vector 13:
  - "Thrillkill" (with Brian Williamson, in 2000 AD #974, 1996)
  - "Screaming Friar" (with Brian Williamson, in 2000 AD #993, 1996)
- Penthouse Comix:
  - "Abducted by Aliens" (with Eliot R. Brown/George Caragonne/Buzz Dixon, in Penthouse Comix #17–20, 1996–1997)
  - "Zheena: Deadlier Than The Male" (with Ian Edginton, in Penthouse Comix No. 26, 1997)
- Nikolai Dante (with Robbie Morrison):
  - "Cruel Seas" (in 2000 AD #1148–1149, 1999)
  - "Requiem for Lost Love" (in 2000 AD #1150, 1999)
  - "Rudinshtein Irregulars " (in 2000 AD #1183–1190, 2000)
  - "Love and War" (in 2000 AD #1200–1207, 2000)
  - "One Last Night in the House of Sin" (in 2000 AD prog 2001, 2000)
  - "The Romanov Empire" (in 2000 AD #1250–1262, 2001)
  - "Hell and High Water" (in 2000 AD prog 2003 & #1322–1328, 2002–2003)
  - "The Sea Falcon" (in 2000 AD prog 2004, 2003)
  - "Agent of Destruction" (in 2000 AD prog 2005 & #1420–1427, 2004–2005)
  - "How could you believe me when I said I loved you when you know I've been a liar all my life?" (in 2000 AD #1428–1431, 2005)
  - "Primal Screams" (in 2000 AD #1433–1436, 2005)
  - "Devil's Deal" (in 2000 AD prog 2006, 2005)
  - "Usurper" (in 2000 AD #1487–1489, 2006)
  - "The Depths" (in 2000 AD #1500–1501, 2006)
  - "Dragon's Island" (in 2000 AD #1502–1507, 2006)
  - "The Road of Bones" (in 2000 AD prog 2007, 2006)
  - "Deadlier than the Male" (in 2000 AD #1518–1520, 2007)
  - "The Beast of Rudinshtein" (in 2000 AD #1532–1535, 2007)
  - "The Dissenter" (in 2000 AD #1537, 2007)
  - "The Chaperone" (in 2000 AD #1560–1564, 2007)
  - "Destiny's Child" (in 2000 AD prog 2008, 2007)
  - "The Tsar's Daughter" (in 2000 AD #1578–1580, 2008)
  - "Prisoner of the Tzar" (in 2000 AD #1612-1616, 2008)
  - "Bring me the Head of Nikolai Dante" (in 2000 AD prog 2009)
  - "Hero of the Revolution" (in 2000 AD, prog 2010, #1666-1675, 2010)
  - "The Master of Krondstadt" (in "2000 AD", #1705-1708, 2010)
  - "The Dante Gambit" (in "2000 AD", #1774-1779, 2012)
- The Scarlet Apocrypha: "Necrocultura" (with Dan Abnett, in Judge Dredd Megazine #4.12, 2002)
- The Bendatti Vendetta (with Robbie Morrison):
  - "The Bendatti Vendetta" (in Judge Dredd Megazine #4.13–18, 2002)
  - "Blooded" (in Judge Dredd Megazine #209–211, 2003)
  - "See Naples and Die" (in Judge Dredd Megazine #234–236, 2005)
- Jane Eyre (Charlotte Bronte, adapted by Amy Corzine, 144 pages, Classical Comics, Spring 2008, ISBN 978-1-906332-06-8, ISBN 978-1-906332-08-2)
- Wuthering Heights (Emily Bronte, adapted by Sean Michael Wilson, Classical Comics, 2011)
- Angel Zero (with Kek-W, in 2000 AD #1751–1763, 2011)
- Sinister Dexter:
  - "Malone Again" (with Dan Abnett, in 2000 AD #1832–35, 2013)
  - "In Plain Shite" (with Dan Abnett, in 2000 AD #1836–40, 2013)
- Future Shocks: "Immunity" (with Eddie Robson, in 2000 AD #1870, 2014)
- The Order (with Kek-W):
  - "The Order" (in 2000 AD "Prog 2015" and #1912–1922, 2014–15)
  - "In the Court of the Wyrmqueen" (in 2000 AD #1961–1972, 2015–16)
  - "Wyrm War" (in 2000 AD #2011–2022, 2016–17)
  - "The New World" (in 2000 AD #2087–2099, 2018)
  - "Inbetween Days" (in 2000 AD #2182, 2020)
  - "Land of the Free" (in 2000 AD #2184–2195, 2020)
  - "Fantastic Voyage" (in 2000 AD #2262–2272, 2021–22)
  - "Heart of Darkness" (in 2000 AD #2317–2324 & 2326–2329, 2023)

== Interviews ==
- Ark #28 (1989)
- Judge Dredd Megazine #224 (2004)
- True Brit (Twomorrows Publishing, 2004)
- Vworp Vworp Vol. 3 (2007)
