= Sandrone Dazieri =

Italian crime writer

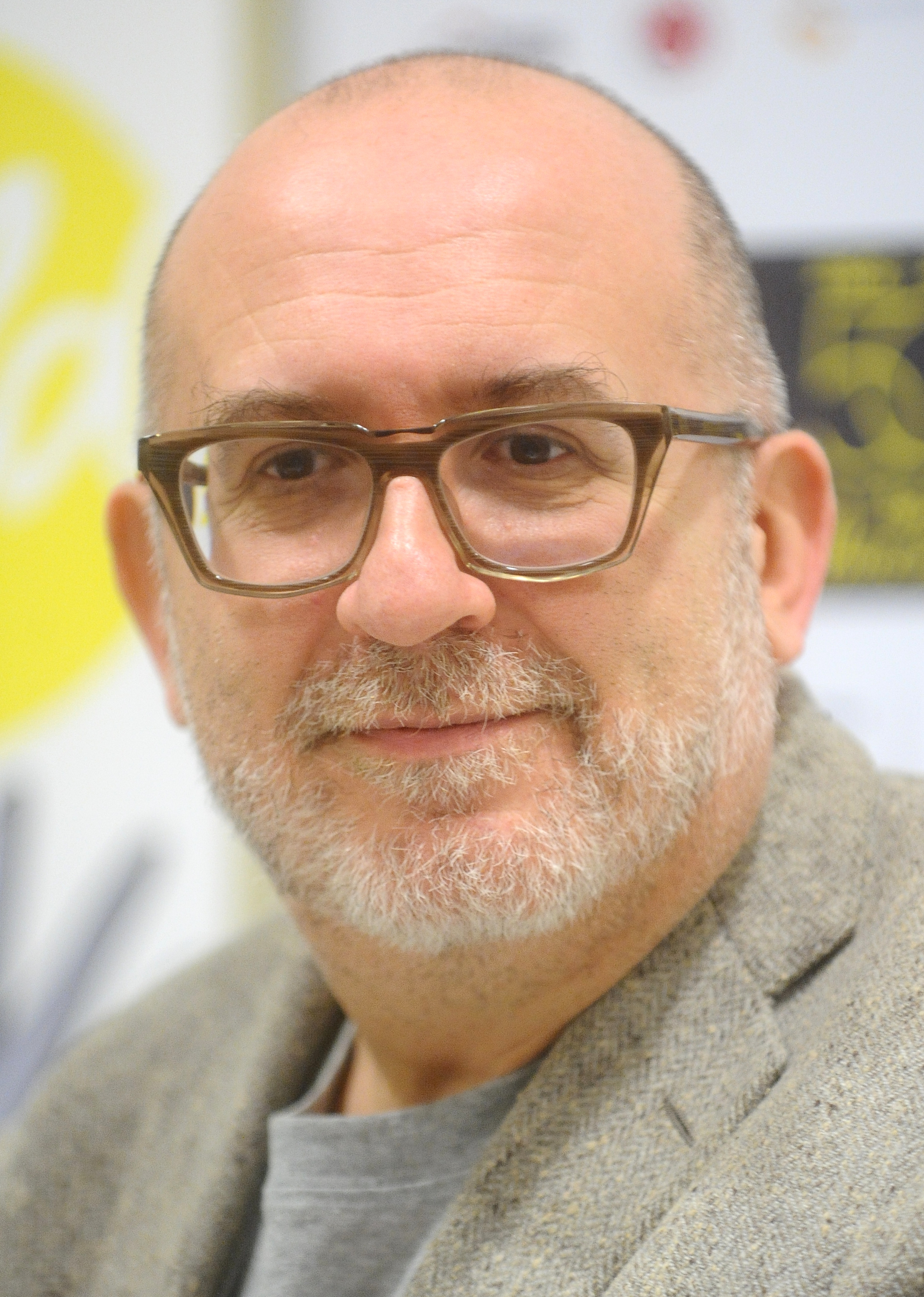
- Sandrone Dazieri at Lucca Comics & Games 2016
- Born: 4 November 1964 (age 61); Cremona, Italy
- Occupations: Author, screenwriter
- Spouse: Olga
- Writing career
- Period: 1900, 2000
- Genre: Crime fiction
- Website: www.sandronedazieri.it

Sandrone Dazieri (born 4 November 1964) is a popular Italian crime writer. His most famous work is the Gorilla series, an episode of which was also dramatized as a television film.

== Biography ==
He was born in Cremona in 1964. He graduated at San Pellegrino Terme hotel-management school and worked as a cook for ten years, all around Italy. After having moved to Milan he started working in a number of jobs, from seller to porter, and played a very active role in the movement of Milan social centers.

In 1992 he got closer to publishing working as a proofreader for Telepress editorial service, and after five years he was appointed general manager of Milan branch. He also worked as a freelance journalist and collaborated with Manifesto as an expert of counterculture and genre fiction.

In 1999 he achieved his first success with the thriller Attenti al gorilla (Watch Out For The Gorilla), the first in a series, where the main character is a sort of doppelgänger of Dazieri himself, living the nightlife in Milan and getting in trouble.

Dazieri's books feature twists and turns in which Sandrone (the main character, who has the author's name) is involved. Sandrone is driven to assist people in hopeless situations. He confronts many dangers, in the tradition of classical thrillers. Aided by his alter ego called Socio (representing the rational side of Sandrone), the main character overcomes these situations.

He wrote two other noir novels (La cura del Gorilla Einaudi - Gorilla Blues Strade Blu Mondadori), a novel for kids (Disney Avventura), some scripts for comics (Pinocchio, Diabolik) and many short stories.

His last novels are: E' stato un attimo (Mondadori Strade Blu 2006, translated into English and published by Hersilia Press in 2012), Cemento Armato (ed. Mondadori 2007) and Bestie (VerdeNero edizioni ambiente 2007).

He is also a scriptwriter; among his films are La cura del Gorilla (from the same book) directed by Carlo A. Sigon and interpreted by Claudio Bisio, Un gioco da ragazze directed by Matteo Rovere and L'ultima Battuta, a TV movie.

With Italian film director Gabriele Salvatores and producer Maurizio Totti, Dazieri founded in 2004 the publishing house Colorado Noir.

From 2000 to 2004 he was also the chief editor of the crime series Gialli Mondadori (Mondadori Thrillers) and the catalogue for young readers Libri per Ragazzi Mondadori (Mondadori Books for Youth). He is currently a literary consultant to the Mondadori Publishing House.

== Bibliography ==
- Antologia cyberpunk (A Cyberpunk Anthology). 1994.
- Sandrone Dazieri (ed.) Italia Overground. Mappe e reti della cultura alternativa (Italy Overground. Maps & Networks of the Alternative Culture). Rome, Castelvecchi, 1996. ISBN 88-86232-76-4.
- Sandrone Dazieri. Attenti al gorilla (Watch Out For The Gorilla). Milano, Mondadori, 1999. ISBN 978-88-04-47328-2.
- Sandrone Dazieri. La cura del Gorilla (The Gorilla Cure). Turin, Einaudi, 2001. ISBN 978-88-06-15699-2.
- Sandrone Dazieri. Gorilla blues. Milan, Mondadori, 2002. ISBN 978-88-04-50989-9.
- Sandrone Dazieri. Ciak si indaga. Walt Disney Italy, 2003 (book for teens). ISBN 978-88-522-0078-6.
- Sandrone Dazieri. Il Karma del gorilla (The Gorilla's Karma). Milan, Mondadori, 2005. ISBN 978-88-04-52855-5.
- Sandrone Dazieri & Daniele G. Genova. La città buia (The Dark City). Aliberti, 2006. ISBN 978-88-7424-123-1.
- Sandrone Dazieri. È stato un attimo (It Was But A Moment). Milan, Mondadori, 2006. ISBN 978-88-04-55998-6.
- Sandrone Dazieri. Bestie (Beasts). Milan, Edizioni Ambiente (environmental series VerdeNero), 2007. ISBN 978-88-89014-64-6.
- Sandrone Dazieri & Marco Martani. Cemento Armato (Reinforced Concrete). Milan, Mondadori, 2007. ISBN 978-88-04-57380-7.
- Niccolo Ammaniti, Sandrone Dazieri, et al.. Crimini (Crimes). London, Bitter Lemon Press, 2008. ISBN 978-1-904738-26-8 (Collection of crime stories, in English).
- Sandrone Dazieri. La Bellezza è un malinteso. Milan, Mondadori, 2010.
- Sandrone Dazieri. Uccidi il padre (Kill the Father). Milan, Mondadori, 2014. ISBN 978-8804611752
- Sandrone Dazieri. L'Angelo (English version: "Kill the Angel") Milan, Mondadori, 2016. ISBN 978-8804655756
- Sandrone Dazieri. Il re di denari (English version: “Kill the King”) Milan, Mondadori, 2018. ISBN 978-1501174728

== Screenwriting ==
- La cura del Gorilla (The Gorilla Cure), directed by Carlo Arturo Sigon (2006)
- L'ultima battuta (The Last Gag), TV movie for the series Crimini (Crimes) (2006)
- Un gioco da ragazze (A Girls Play), directed by Matteo Rovere (2008)
- La valle della paura (Valley of Fear), (filming 2008–2009)
- Bestie (Beasts), TV movie (2009)
- My name is Vendetta, Netflix (2022)
