= The Seekers (comics) =

The Seekers is a British comic strip drawn by John M. Burns, written by Les Lilley, succeeded by Phillip Douglas and Dick O'Neil. The strip ran from 1966 to 1971 in The Daily Sketch.

== Synopsis ==
The main characters, Susanne Dove and Jacob Benedick, are two preferred secret agents employed by Una Frost, director of "The Seekers", an elite agency of missing persons retrieval. Their investigations frequently lead to adventures connected to the sex industry, exploiting the attractiveness of both detectives, and usually leading to the downfall of sexual predators and oppressors.

== Publication history ==
The Seekers began publication on 2 May 1966 in The Daily Sketch. The concept of the strip bears some resemblance to another strip Burns later drew for a brief period, Modesty Blaise. The female characters were consistently drawn in an enticing manner, indicating Burns' evident intent to challenge the limits of the daily British newspaper strip conventions of the times. The initial writer Les Lilley was succeeded by Phillip Douglas starting with episode 14, The Missing Golfers, occasionally aided by Dick O'Neil, who wrote one story, The Curse of the One-Eyed Sailor.

The strip ended on 10 May 1971, abandoned due to its lack of lasting success. It enjoyed some popularity in Italy where it was known as I Segugi, and the Scandinavian countries, serialised as Spårhundarna in Sweden, Sporhundene in Norway and Denmark, and Vainukoirat in Finland, and as Tragači it was serialized in Yugoslavia in at least three different magazines during the 1970s and 1980s. The name, Seekers, translates to Bloodhounds in Swedish, Norwegian, Danish and Finnish publications of the strip.

== Story list ==
Exposition panels from the first story, The Boneyard Club (1966)

№	Title	Author	Strips
1	The Boneyard Club	Les Lilley	M103–M180
2	The Missing Groom	Les Lilley	M181–M252
3	Red Elibank	Les Lilley	M253–N12
4	The Bookman Vanishes	Les Lilley	N13–N84
5	The Collection	Les Lilley	N85–N155
6	The Irish Caper	Les Lilley	N156–N233
7	Jamaican Joyride	Les Lilley	N234–N309, P1-P2
8	John Silver	Les Lilley	P3–P83
9	The Highest Bidder	Les Lilley	P84–P169
10	The Missing Star	Les Lilley	P170–P254
11	Lost Monastery	Les Lilley	P255–P278, Q1-Q60
12	The Off-Beat Case	Les Lilley	Q61–Q120
13	Art Theft	Les Lilley	Q121–Q198
14	The Missing Golfers	Phillip; Douglas	Q199–Q276
15	A Matter of Life and Death	Phillip; Douglas	Q277–Q309, R1-R45
16	Where’s Una?	Phillip; Douglas	R46–R117
17	The Man Who Died Twice	Phillip; Douglas	R118–R178
18	The Boy With the Golden Boots	Phillip; Douglas	R179–R239
19	Hoop of Fire	Phillip; Douglas	R240–R305, T1-T8
20	The Day the Birds Dropped Dead	Phillip; Douglas	T9–T68
21	The Curse of the One-Eyed Sailor	Dick O'Neil	T69–T107
22	Title missing	Phillip; Douglas	T109–T125
23	Wheels of Fate	Phillip; Douglas	T126–T185
24	The Tracy Madison Affair	Phillip; Douglas	T186–T245
25	Goddess of the Seven Moons	Phillip; Douglas	T246–T317
26	Legs on Broadway	Phillip; Douglas	T318–T365
27	Dead Girls Tell	Phillip; Douglas	T366–T413

== Sources ==
- The Seekers - Spårhundarna (in Swedish)
- John M. Burns bio FFF (in Italian)

Footnotes
