= The Suicide Six =

British comics series

The Suicide Six was a British comics series drawn by Brian Lewis between 1962 and 1963. It was published in the comics magazine Tiger, debuting with issue #13 [362] (January 1962).

== Concept ==
The Suicide Six was a war comic set during World War II, and described the fantastic exploits of a (fictional) six-person squad of Allied troops from various British Empire nations fighting in North Africa.

== Characters ==
- Captain Dan "Rocky" Rock, from England
- Sergeant Rafferty
- "Sapper" Gunn, a cockney formerly of the Royal Engineers
- "Bluey" Doyle, an Australian and a crack shot with a Lee–Enfield rifle
- Dave Lawson
- "Sparks" Grant
