= The Gorgon =

1964 British film by Terence Fisher

- Directed by: Terence Fisher
- Screenplay by: John Gilling; Anthony Nelson Keys
- Story by: J. Llewellyn Divine
- Produced by: Anthony Nelson Keys
- Starring: Peter Cushing; Christopher Lee; Richard Pasco; Barbara Shelley; Michael Goodliffe
- Cinematography: Michael Reed
- Edited by: James Needs; Eric Boyd-Perkins
- Music by: James Bernard
- Production company: Hammer Film Productions
- Distributed by: British Lion-Columbia Distributors
- Release date: 18 October 1964 (United Kingdom)
- Running time: 83 minutes
- Country: United Kingdom
- Budget: £150,000

The Gorgon is a 1964 British horror film directed by Terence Fisher and starring Christopher Lee, Peter Cushing, Richard Pasco and Barbara Shelley. The screenplay was by John Gilling and Anthony Nelson Keys. It was produced by Keys for Hammer Films.

== Plot ==
Germany 1910: The village of Vandorf has suffered seven murders in five years. Each victim has been turned to stone.

In an old millhouse within a forest, Sascha Cass tells her artist boyfriend Bruno Heitz that she is carrying his child. Wanting to stand up to his obligations, Bruno races off into the night to see Sascha's father despite her pleas for him not to go. She races after Bruno, but soon loses him in the forest. There, she finds a creature, looks into its face and dies. Upon examination of the body, Dr. Namaroff, a brain specialist at the Vandorf Medical Institution, discovers that Cass has turned to stone. Bruno is later found hanged in the forest. An inquest decides that it is a case of murder and suicide by Bruno, and Namaroff does not reveal the condition of Cass' corpse.

The villagers, feeling robbed of any vengeance, attack Bruno's father, Professor Jules Heitz. The police department's officers warn Jules to leave Vandorf, but he refuses to go until Bruno's name is cleared. Jules knows that a conspiracy of silence has been set up and that the villagers do not believe the true cause. He believes that the murders are the result of something inhuman from Ancient Mythology. Its spirit haunts Castle Borski; the Gorgon Megaera, is a creature whose face can turn human skin to stone.

Jules contacts his friend Professor Meister of Leipzig University, who is also his son Paul's tutor. Paul leaves to see Jules. That night, Jules is drawn to Borski Castle by a calling sound. There, he sees Megaera's face. He staggers back to the millhouse, and, whilst turning to stone, outlines a letter to Paul mentioning Megaera. Paul arrives and learns of Jules's death. Namaroff's assistant Carla Hoffman visits him at the millhouse and secretly reads Jules's letter. She later recites what she can remember of it to Namaroff. Warden Ratoff then reports that Martha, a violent inmate, has escaped the Institution. Namaroff reveals to Carla that Megaera's spirit exists and occasionally takes over the body of a human being.

That night, Paul is drawn outside the millhouse by a sound and glimpses upon Megaera's reflection in the garden pool. He wakes five days later in the Institution, aged by ten years. To destroy Megaera, Paul returns to the millhouse. Namaroff has Carla followed by Ratoff. That night, there is a full moon. Under it, Paul visits the graveyard and exhumes Jules's body and discovers that it is solid stone. Carla silently watches him. She eventually confides to Paul that Namaroff is in love with her and that she is terrified of him. Paul promises to take her away with him when Megaera is dead. But Carla fears it will be too late by then.

Meister arrives at the millhouse to see Paul. Meanwhile, Martha dies soon after being recaptured by Ratoff. Meister and Paul visit Inspector Kanof. They force him to reveal that Carla arrived in Vandorf as an amnesiac prior to the first murder.

Meeting in secret at Castle Borski the next morning, Carla tells Paul that she will go away with him to safety, but it must be right now. He refuses and she runs off. Paul runs after her and is attacked by a waiting Ratoff, whom Meister scares off. Meister believes that Carla becomes an amnesiac during the full moon. It is during that period that Megaera's spirit enters her body. Paul agrees with Carla that she must leave immediately and that he will follow later when the mystery is solved. Later that day, Paul cables Leipzig where Carla is supposed to have arrived by train, but there is no sign of her.

That night he goes to Castle Borski as a full moon is rising. There amidst the Castle ruins, Namaroff awaits with a sword for Carla's arrival. He attacks Paul, and they fight while Megaera appears. Namaroff tries to behead Megaera, but looks upon her face and is turned to stone. Using Namaroff's sword, Meister beheads Megaera – but it is too late to save Paul, who has seen Megaera's face. Slowly turning to stone, Paul looks upon Megaera's severed head as her features change to that of Carla.

== Cast ==
- Christopher Lee as Professor Karl Meister
- Peter Cushing as Dr. Namaroff
- Richard Pasco as Paul Heitz
- Barbara Shelley as Carla Hoffman
- Michael Goodliffe as Professor Jules Heitz
- Jack Watson as Ratoff
- Patrick Troughton as Inspector Kanof
- Prudence Hyman as Megaera the Gorgon
- Joyce Hemson as Martha
- Toni Gilpin as Sascha Cass
- Jeremy Longhurst as Bruno Heitz
- Joseph O'Conor as the coroner
- Alister Williamson as Janus Cass
- Michael Peake as the constable
- Redmond Phillips as Hans

== Production ==
The Gorgon was based on a story submitted to Hammer by their Canadian fan J. Llewellyn Divine. Director John Gilling and producer Anthony Nelson Keys expanded on Divine's outline, developing it into a screenplay. For the role of the monster, former ballerina Prudence Hyman was recruited because the monster was supposed to float gracefully like a wraith. Filming occurred at Bray Studios in Berkshire.

== Release ==
The Gorgon was distributed in the United Kingdom by Columbia Pictures/BLC Films on 18 October 1964, where it was supported by The Curse of the Mummy's Tomb. It was released in the United States by Columbia Pictures on 17 February 1965, where it was also supported by The Curse of the Mummy's Tomb.

== Reception ==
Variety wrote: "Though written and directed on a leisurely note, The Gorgon is a well-made, direct yarn that mainly gets its thrills through atmosphere. The period storyline is simple and predictable, but John Gilling has turned out a well-rounded piece and Terence Fisher's direction is restrained enough to avoid any unintentional yocks."

The Monthly Film Bulletin wrote: "The Gorgon myth does not fit happily into Transylvanian surroundings, and there are too many red-herrings indicative of the script's straining after horrific effect (the mad woman, the brain transplantation, etc.). The trouble is that one is never really in doubt as to who the Gorgon is. Also, as in Hammer's stablemate, The Curse of the Mummy's Tomb, the monster's appearance is belated, vague and insufficiently spectacular. Still, it makes a change from vampires, and though the film has little genuine flair for atmosphere it is quite well acted by Richard Pasco and an appropriately blank-eyed, statuesque Barbara Shelley."

On Rotten Tomatoes, the film holds an approval rating of 67% based on 12 reviews, with a weighted average rating of 5.6/10.

== Home media ==
In the United Kingdom, The Gorgon was released as part of the region A, B and C Blu-ray box set Hammer Volume One: Fear Warning. The set, which was limited to 6,000 units, also included Maniac, The Curse of the Mummy's Tomb, and Fanatic.

The Gorgon was released in the U.S. on Blu-ray by Mill Creek Entertainment in March 2018 as a double feature along with the Hammer movie, The Two Faces of Dr. Jekyll. The title of the film is misspelled as "The Gorgan" on the spine.

== In other media ==
The Gorgon was adapted into a 17-page comics story by Scott Goodall, with art by Trevor Goring and Alberto Cuyas, which was told in two parts in the magazine The House of Hammer, issues #11 and 12, published in August 1977 and September 1977 by General Books Distribution (an imprint of Thorpe & Porter).

== Sources ==
- Fellner, Chris (2019). The Encyclopedia of Hammer Films. Rowman & Littlefield. ISBN 978-1538126592.
