= Kurt Caesar =

Painter, journalist and comic book artist

Kurt Caesar (also known as Cesare Avai or Caesar Away, true name Kurt Kaiser; 30 March 1906 – 12 July 1974) was a German-Italian painter, journalist and comic book artist.

He was born at Montigny-lès-Metz, Alsace-Lorraine, to German father. He studied Engineering in Leipzig, but later he moved to the Academy of Fine Arts in Berlin; in the meantime he had a boxing career which led him to win a German title. In 1929 he became correspondent for a magazine in Zürich and collaborated for several German magazines; his journalist career led him to travel in Europe and Asia. After his marriage he moved to Italy, where he started to work at successful comics, such as Romano il Legionario, a popular nationalist character published in Il Vittorioso. He also drew "Aeroporto Z" and "Will Sparrow" for Donald Duck and Other Adventures (Paperino e altre avventure).

During World War II Caesar was in Morocco, Libya and Spain, and, in 1941, again in Africa as interpreter for Erwin Rommel. Captured by the English, he returned to Italy after the end of the conflict. Here he continued to work at Il Vittorioso until, in 1952, he was called as cover artist for the science-fiction magazine I Romanzi di Urania, for which he realized some 170 works until 1958, when he was replaced by Carlo Jacono. Caesar then moved to other popular magazine-book series for the same publisher, Arnoldo Mondadori Editore, I Gialli and Segretissimo. Other series he worked to include the unsuccessful Italian science fiction magazines Oltre il Cielo and Cronache del Futuro, and the German Perry Rhodan.

He died by infarction in 1974 in his house at Bracciano.
