= Vanity Fair (1956 TV series) =

British TV drama series (1956–1957)

- Based on: Vanity Fair by William Makepeace Thackeray
- Screenplay by: Constance Cox; Ian Dallas
- Starring: Joyce Redman; Petra Davies; Derek Blomfield
- Country of origin: United Kingdom
- No. of series: 1
- No. of episodes: 6 (5 missing)

Production
- Producer: Campbell Logan
- Running time: 30 minutes (per episode)

Original release
- Network: BBC
- Release: 28 December 1956 – 1 February 1957

Vanity Fair was a 1956–57 six-part BBC TV serial adaptation of William Makepeace Thackeray's 1848 novel of the same name. The cast included Joyce Redman, Petra Davies, Derek Blomfield, Alan Badel, David Peel, Graham Stuart, Marian Spencer, Jack May. Telerecorded during its live broadcast, only the first episode is known to survive, with the others being junked following a repeat of the telerecordings in 1957.

== Cast ==
- Joyce Redman as Becky Sharp
- Petra Davies as Amelia Sedley
- Derek Blomfield as Captain Dobbin
- Alan Badel as Rawdon Crawley
- Graham Stuart as John Sedley
- Marian Spencer as Mrs. John Sedley
- Jack May as Joseph Sedley
- David Peel as George Osborne
- Barbara Leake as Miss Briggs
- Lloyd Pearson as Sir Pitt Crawley
- Graham Leaman as Gentleman at Stock Exchange
- Henry Oscar as Osborne Senior
- Marda Vanne as Miss Crawley
- Michael Caridia as George Osborne
- Dorothy Black as Miss Barbara Pinkerton
- George Curzon as Lord Steyne
- Christopher Steele as Mr. Moss
- Katharine Page as Mrs. Bute Crawley
- Lockwood West as Pitt Crawley
