= Segretissimo =

Italian spy novel series

Segretissimo is an Italian series of spy/thriller/noir novels, published by Arnoldo Mondadori Editore since 1961. A first series with the same name was launched in October 1960, featuring 12 spy novels all by Jean Bruce; the series was then restarted from #1, which (apart Bruce) has featured mainly translations of American or British authors, such as James Hadley Chase, Edward S. Aarons, Stephen Gunn and others, as well as the Nick Carter series and the SAS series by Gérard de Villiers and his followers.

The series spawned several companions, such as Segretissimo presenta, Supersegretissimo and Segretissimo SAS, both containing reprints. Cover artists include Ferenc Pintèr (whole first series) and Carlo Jacono.

== See also ==
- Il Giallo Mondadori
- Urania (magazine)
- Arnoldo Mondadori Editore
