= John Stokes (comics) =

British comics artist

- Areas: Penciler, Inker
- Notable works: Fishboy

John Stokes is a British comics artist who has largely worked for IPC and Marvel UK and is best known for his work on Fishboy.

== Biography ==
Stokes got into the comics industry thanks to his brother, George Stokes, who already worked for IPC. He lived in India until the age of 8 or 9, and when he came to England the first comic work he saw was that of his brother and colleagues, as well the comic Eagle, which launched around the same time. This sparked a lifelong interest in comics and he moved from drawing comics in his spare time at school and trying not to draw comics at art school (where his interest was discouraged), to doing it professionally, starting in the early 1960s.

He worked, largely uncredited (as was the practice at the time), for IPC for 16 years where, among other things, he drew all 360 installments of Fishboy as well as a number of other Buster strips. From 1964 to 1967, he also drew the strip Britain in Chains (later editions were entitled The Battle for Britain) for Lion; the strip was later reprinted (with a truncated ending) in Smash! between 1969 and 1971. For Smash! in 1969–1970, Stokes drew the adventure strip Rebbels on the Run, about three young brothers who run away from an orphanage to avoid being split up. As the strip evolved into more of a science fiction story, it was retitled The Rebbel Robot after a few months.

In the late seventies, he was recruited by Dez Skinn, initially on The House of Hammer, and then for Marvel UK, on such titles as Black Knight, The Transformers and Doctor Who. In the early to mid-eighties he also worked for other British comics such as Warrior and 2000 AD.

Following the success of the British Invasion he got more work with DC Comics and Marvel in the early-to-mid 1990s. In more recent years he has done inking work for DC's imprint Vertigo on The Invisibles with Grant Morrison, who he had worked with previously at Marvel and 2000 AD. He has also returned to 2000 AD after a 15-year hiatus to do more inking work.

Influences include Frank Hampson and Frank Bellamy.

== Bibliography ==
- Maxwell Hawke (in Buster, 1965–1966)
- Fishboy (with Scott Goodall, in Buster, 1968–1975)
- Britain in Chains (The Battle for Britain) (in Lion, 1964–1967) — reprinted in Smash!, 1969–1971)
- Rebbels on the Run / The Rebbel Robot (in Smash!, 1969–1970)
- Marney The Fox (with Scott Goodall, in Buster, 1974–1976)
- The War Children (with Scott Goodall, in Buster, 1976–1977)
- Lennie The Loner (in Buster, 1978–1979)
- Keen & Mustard (in Buster, 1978–1980)
- Black Knight (with Steve Parkhouse and Paul Neary, in Hulk Weekly, Marvel UK, 1979–1980)
- Doctor Who:
  - "Star Death" (with Alan Moore, in Doctor Who Monthly No. 47, reprinted in The Daredevils No. 5, 1980)
  - "Crisis on Kalidor" (with Steve Moore, in Doctor Who Monthly #50)
  - "Devil of the Deep" (with John Peel, in Doctor Who Monthly #61)
  - "The Fires Down Below" (with John Peel, in Doctor Who Monthly #67)
- Star Wars:
  - "Death Masque" (with Steve Moore, in Empire Strikes Back Monthly #149, Marvel UK,1981)
  - "Tilotny Throws a Shape" (with Alan Moore, in Empire Strikes Back Monthly #154, Marvel UK, 1982)
  - "Dark Lord's Conscience" (with Alan Moore, in Empire Strikes Back Monthly #155, Marvel UK, 1982)
  - "The Flight of the Falcon " (with Steve Parkhouse, in Empire Strikes Back Monthly #157, Marvel UK, 1982)
  - "Blind Fury!" (with Alan Moore, in Empire Strikes Back Monthly #159, Marvel UK, 1982)
- Time Bandits (inks, with Steve Parkhouse and pencils by David Lloyd, film adaptation, Marvel, 1982)
- The Brides of Dracula (with Steve Moore, film adaptation, in Halls of Horror issues #27–28 (1983)
- The Legend of Prester John (with Steve Moore, in Warrior #11–13, 1983)
- Father Shandor: "Neither Heaven Nor Hell" (with Steve Moore, in Warrior No. 25, 1984)
- "And There Shall Come... A Leader!" (with Simon Furman, in The Transformers Annual, Marvel UK, December 1985)
- Captain Granbretan (illustrations for text story with Grant Morrison, in Captain Britain volume 2 No. 13, Marvel UK, 1986)
- Tharg's Future Shocks:
  - "Oh What a Lovely War" (with Oleh Stepaniuk, in 2000 AD No. 464, 1986)
  - "Biological Warfare" (with Oleh Stepaniuk, in 2000 AD No. 466, 1986)
  - "Alien Aid" (with Grant Morrison, in 2000 AD No. 469, 1986)
  - "The Shop that Sold Everything" (with Grant Morrison, in 2000 AD No. 477, 1986)
- L.E.G.I.O.N. No. 50, 53–55, 57 and 60 (with Mark Waid, DC Comics, 1993)
- Nocturne #1–2 and 4 (inks, with Dan Abnett and pencils by Joe Fonteriz, 4-issue mini-series, Marvel Comics, 1994)
- Triumph (inks, with Christopher Priest and pencils by Mike S. Miller, 4-issue mini-series, DC comics, 1995)
- The Warrior of Waverly Street (with Manny Coto, 2-issue mini-series, Dark Horse Comics, 1996)
- Tempest #1–3 (inks, script and pencils by Phil Jimenez, 4-issue mini-series, DC Comics, 1996–1997)
- Aliens: "Havoc" (inks, with Mark Schultz and pencils by Leif Jones, 2-issue mini-series, Dark Horse Comics, 1997)
- The Invisibles #1–5, 6–14, 17–19, 22 and 1 (inks, with Grant Morrison and various artists, Vertigo, 1997–2000)
- Star Kid (with Manny Coto, one-shot film prequel, Dark Horse Comics, 1998)
- Randy Bowen's Decapitator #1–2 and 4 (inks, with Randy Bowen and pencils by Rob McCallum, 4-issue mini-series, Dark Horse Comics, 1998)
- Sinister Dexter: "Sumo Chanted Evening" (inks, with Dan Abnett and pencils by Jon Haward, in 2000 AD #1270, 2001)
- American Century #1–8, 10–11, 13–15 and 19 (inks, with Howard Chaykin and David Tischman and pencils by Marc Laming, DC Comics, 2001–2002)
- Tales of Telguuth (inks, with Steve Moore and pencils by Jon Haward):
  - "The Wheels of Fortune" (in 2000 AD #1285–1286, 2002)
  - "Holding The Fort" (in 2000 AD #1369, 2003)
- Great Expectations (with Jen Green, graphic novel adaptation, Classical Comics, Spring 2008)
