= Trevor Goring (comics) =

British artist

Trevor Goring is a British artist who has worked in the comic book industry and the film industry. His comics work includes 2000 AD, House of Hammer, and Death Race 2020. Since the mid-1990s Goring has mostly focused on being a storyboard artist, working on such films as Independence Day, The Cell, Gattaca, X2, Watchmen, and The Cabin in the Woods.

In high school, Goring published a fanzine called Seminar, which has the distinction of being the first publication to publish a piece by Alan Moore. After high school, Goring attended Saint Martin's School of Art in London.

Goring started working in the British comics industry in the late 1970s. He was a regular participant in the British Comic Art Convention ("Comicon"), being a guest of the 1976, 1977, and 1978 editions of the show. In addition, he contributed to the 1970, 1976, and 1978 Comicon program booklets, providing the cover for the 1976 edition.

In 1983, Goring worked on the BBC Television children's television series Captain Zep.

In 1991, Goring left England for Los Angeles and began working in the American film industry and comics industries.

== Bibliography ==
artwork unless otherwise noted.

- (with Scott Goodall) The Gorgon (adaptation), in House of Hammer #11–12 (Aug.–Sept. 1977)
- (with Steve Moore) The Plague of the Zombies (adaptation) in House of Hammer #13 (Oct. 1977)
- 2000 AD #s 32, 34, 38, 51 (IPC, 1977)
- (with Martin Lock) "Space Prospector" (Tharg's Future Shocks), 2000 AD #40 (IPC, 26 Nov. 1977)
- (with Richard Burton) "Galactic Garbage" (Tharg's Future Shocks), 2000 AD#51 (IPC, 1978)
- (with Roy Preston [as Henry Miller], Nick Landau, and Garry Leach) "The Doomsday Machine," (Dan Dare) in 2000 AD #79-84 (IPC, 1978)
- (with Peter Milligan) "The Possessed" (Tharg's Future Shocks), in 2000 AD #375 (Fleetway, 1984)
- (with Gerry Finley-Day) "Just Routine" in 2000 AD #378 (Fleetway, 1984)
- (with Sydney Jordan and Thayed Rich) Jeff Hawke: "The Devil at Rennes-le-Chateau", A1 volume 6 (Atomeka Press, 1991)
- (with Roy Preston [as Henry Miller]) Dare the Impossible (Fleetway) #7–9 (1991–1992)
- (colorist) James Bond 007: Light of My Death (Dark Horse Comics, 1 March 1993 – 1 June 1993)
- (with Mike Carey) Pantera (Malibu Comics): "Power in the Darkness" (one-shot, 1994)
- (with Pat Mills) Death Race 2020 (Roger Corman's Cosmic Comics, issues #4–8, 1995)
- (with Andrew Stephenson) Waterloo Sunset #1–4 (Image Comics, 2004)
- (with Brendan McCarthy) Solo #12 (DC Comics, 2006)
- (with Marc Sumerak) "What if Iron Man Had Died?", What If? Fallen Son #1 (Marvel Comics, 2009)
- (with Carole E. Barrowman and Tommy Lee Edwards) "Captain Jack and the Selkie," Torchwood Magazine 14 (Titan Magazines, Feb. 2009)
