= Prudence Hyman =

British ballerina and actress (1914–1995)

- Born: Prudence Hythe; January , 1914; London, England
- Died: June 1, 1995 (aged 81)
- Occupations: Ballerina, actress
- Known for: Playing the title role in The Gorgon (1964)

Prudence Hyman (January 1914 – 1 June 1995) was a British ballerina and actress.

She was born Prudence Hythe in London in January 1914.

In the 1960s, she had a career as an actress in Hammer Film Productions' horror films, taking the title role in 1964's The Gorgon. In 1962, she took the part of Lady Bayliss in Design for Loving. She also played Eleanor of Aquitaine in the 1960s TV series, Richard the Lionheart.
