= Sean Michael Wilson =

Scottish comic book writer

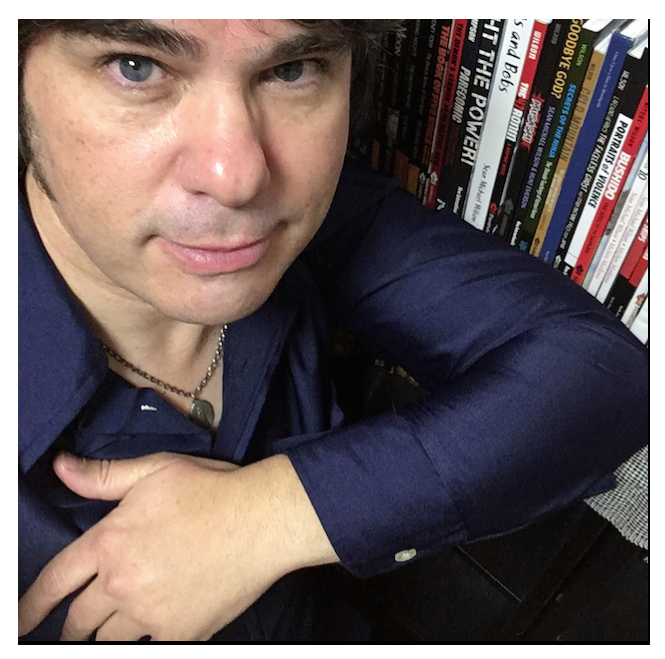
- Areas: Writer, graphic novelist, comic book writer
- Notable works: AX:alternative manga Book of Five Rings; Portraits of Violence
- Awards: 2016 International Manga Award winner, 2016 Eisner Award nomination, 2013 Stan Lee Excelsior Award winner.

Sean Michael Wilson is a Scottish comic book writer from Edinburgh. He has written more than 40 books with a variety of US, UK and Japanese publishers and has been nominated for both the Eisner and Harvey book awards, and won a medal in the Japanese government's 'International Manga Award', 2016 (the first British person to receive that award).

== Biography ==
Wilson grew up in Edinburgh, Scotland in a family with strong Irish roots, and went to Catholic school and church as a boy. He was deeply inspired to create comic books at an early age by the comic 2000 AD, which he first saw when he was 12 in a newsagent near his school in Edinburgh. Coming from a working-class background in which no one had higher education and having dyslexic learning difficulties he struggled in school, being placed in special needs class for a year, but he overcame these to become the first ever person in his wider family to go to university.

He largely focused on writing poetry and short stories while studying Sociology and Psychology at Glasgow Caledonian University and a postgraduate in Anthropology at Edinburgh University, self-publishing 5 booklets of these during that time. He later got a teaching qualification as a college lecturer in sociology and psychology from the University of London (UCL). From the start he mixed teaching with writing, by working on documentary films for British television until deciding to return to focus on his first love, comic books.

Wilson's first published comics story came out in 1998 in a book and display of an exhibition of comic art in London and his first full book was published in winter 2003. Although around half of his books are 'western' style graphic novels, he often works with Japanese and Chinese artists on manga style books, being ideally placed to do so as he now lives in Japan. He is influenced by the Gekiga movement writers, Yoshihiro Tatsumi, Yoshiharu Tsuge, Matsumoto Masahiko. His first Japanese language work came out in Summer 2008 on the Japanese keitai manga network (comics on cell/mobile phone). Making him perhaps the first British comic book writer to have his work available on Japanese mobile phones. He is also the only British comic book writer, so far, to have a multi-book deal with the Kodansha publishing group in Japan. He edited the groundbreaking collection of indie style manga, 'AX: alternative manga', for Top Shelf Publications - which was highly praised by critics ('Top ten books of 2010' of Publishers Weekly, nominated for a prestigious Harvey Award) and noted as the most important such collection of manga yet published. But his main influences remain British and American comics, such as creators Alan Moore, Grant Morrison, Eddie Campbell and Harvey Pekar.

Wilson's work is equally split between original stories and adaptations of existing work into comic book form. Several of his books have been adaptations for the UK publisher Classical Comics. This has involved working with a range of well-known artists adapting 19th-century novels into comic books that stay close to the original in plot and historical accuracy. Including 'A Christmas Carol' (with Judge Dredd, Wonder Woman and Dr Who artist Mike Collins, and with sales so far of more than 20,000 copies), 'Sweeney Todd', Oscar Wilde's 'A Canterville Ghost' and 'Wuthering Heights' (with esteemed artist John M Burns of 2000AD, Look and Learn, etc.).

Wilson has attempted to do comic books that are different from the normal superhero/fantasy brands, working with a variety of 'non-comic book' organisations in the process, such as a British museum, the UK arts council, the Global Institute for Tomorrow, Bristol University, Asia Literary Review, the Norwegian People's Alliance, the British and American Humanist Associations, Basic Income groups and the activist charity War on Want. His book with War on Want, 'Iraq:Operation Corporate Takeover' was reported on by a variety of mainstream agencies across the world, such as Reuters, CCTV in China, Austrian Radio and several middle eastern magazines. His book 'Parecomic' has an introduction by Noam Chomsky, who is also in the book several times - Chomsky's first official connection with a graphic novel. His book contrasting science and religion, Goodbye God?, was made with the participation of English philosopher Stephen Law of the University of London and an introduction by Prof. Lawrence Krauss. In May 2019 his book 'The Many Not the Few' with artists Robert Brown (published by New Internationalist and the British Union GFTU) was launched in the UK parliament building, the House of Commons. This is the first time a comic book has had a launched event in the House of Commons. Shadow chancellor, John McDonell, and Labour Party leader, Jeremy Corbyn, attended - who both hold well received speeches in support of the book. In 2020 he received the Scottish Samurai Award from an association promoting connections between Japan and Scotland. In 2024 his book on the struggle of Abdullah Ocalan and the Kurdish people was published in four languages at events in Berlin and London and Cambridge University, strongly supported by the Kurdish communities in those countries and by the international Kurdish support group.

His work has been translated into Japanese, Chinese, French, Spanish, Korean, Croatian, Portuguese, Catalan, Indonesian, Czech, Turkish, Swedish, Kurdish, Arabic and Italian. In 2014 he was listed among the 'Ten Great Scottish Graphic Novel Creators' by the Scottish Book Trust.

Wilson is a regular guest at comic book festivals, schools and colleges where he gives talks and workshops about comics and alternative manga. He also occasionally writes newspaper articles for places such as The Japan Times, the London Economic, the Herald and his own article website 'Radical Roots'.

== Awards and recognition ==
- 2008 Wilson's version of A Christmas Carol, with artists Mike Collins and David Roach, in The Sunday Times 'Ten Best Books of the Year'
- 2010 AX: alternative manga, edited by Wilson, nominated for the prestigious Harvey Award.
- 2012 Wilson's version of Wuthering Heights, with John M Burns, nominated for the 'Stan Lee Excelsior Awards' in 2012, by over 170 schools in the UK.
- 2012 Wilson's version of A Christmas Carol, with Mike Collins and David Roach, won gold medal in the 2012 'Language Learner Literature Awards'.
- 2013 Wilson's version of 'Sweeney Todd', with Declan Shalvey, wins the JABICA award of the 'Stan Lee Excelsior Awards'.
- 2014 Wilson listed among the 'Ten Great Scottish Graphic Novel Creators' by the Scottish Book Trust.
- 2015 The anthology of stories about WW1 Wilson was part of, 'To End All Wars', was nominated for 'Best Anthology' in the 2015 Eisner awards.
- 2015 Cold Mountain, with Akiko Shimojima, won an award in the national 'China Animation and Comic Competition' (in the category of 'Best Overseas Comic').
- 2016 Lafcadio Hearn’s "The Faceless Ghost", with Michiru Morikawa, on recommended reading list, 'Great Graphic Novels for Teens', of the library association, USA.
- 2016 Lafcadio Hearn’s "The Faceless Ghost", with Michiru Morikawa, won a medal in the 2016 'Independent Book Publishers Awards', USA.
- 2016 Lafcadio Hearn’s "The Faceless Ghost", with Michiru Morikawa, nominated for an Eisner Award, the top award for comic books in the USA.
- 2016 Secrets of the Ninja, with Akiko Shimojima, won a medal in the 'International Manga Awards' of the Japanese Government.
- 2018 Portraits of Violence, with Dr Brad Evans, won a medal in the 2018 'Independent Book Publishers Awards', USA.
- 2019 his book 'The Many Not the Few’, with Robert Brown, was launched by the Labour Party leader in an event in the Attlee Room, Houses of Parliament.
- 2020 he received the Scottish Samurai Award from an association promoting connections between Japan and Scotland.
- 2021 his book 'The Minamata Story’, with Akiko Shimojima, won a silver medal in the Freeman Book Awards of Columbia University.

== Bibliography (earliest books listed first) ==
- Angel of the Woods (with Jorge Heufemann, graphic novel, 84 pages, Boychild Productions, December 2003, ISBN 0-9546596-0-0)
- "Chimpira" (in Manga Mover, Boychild Productions, September 2004, ISBN 0-9546596-2-7)
- Beautiful things (with Neill Cameron and other artists, Boychild Productions, June 2005, ISBN 0-9546596-1-9)
- The Japanese Drawing Room (with artist Sakura Mizuki, Russell-Cotes Art Gallery & Museum May 2006, ISBN 0-905173-80-5)
- "Gang of Love" (in Yaoi, Volume 1, Yaoi Press, April 2007, ISBN 1-933664-15-0)
- Lafcadio Hearn's Japanese Ghost Stories (140 pages, Demented Dragon Books, 2007)
- Iraq: Operation Corporate Takeover (with Lee O'Connor, War on Want/Boychild Productions, June 2007, ISBN 0-9546596-3-5)
- "The Story of Lee" (with Yishan Li, in the Mammoth Book of Best New Manga Volume 2, October 2007, ISBN 1-84529-642-7)
- A Christmas Carol (adaptation, with pencils by Mike Collins and inks by David Roach, 132 pages, Classical Comics, October 2008, Original Text, ISBN 1-906332-17-7, Quick Text, ISBN 1-906332-18-5)
- Lafcadio Hearn's Japanese Ghost Stories (120 pages, Keitai/cell phone version in the Japanese language, Tokyo Shoseki Insatsu, 2008)
- AX (as editor, 400 pages, Top Shelf Productions, July 2010, nominated for the Harvey Award, 2010)
- Hagakure: the manga edition (with art by Chie Kutsuwada, 145 pages, Kodansha, Sept 2010 in Japan, January 2011 elsewhere.)
- The Canterville Ghost (adaptation, with art by Steve Bryant and Jason Millet, 144 pages, Classical Comics, October 2010, Original Text, ISBN 1-906332-27-4, Quick Text, ISBN 1-906332-28-2)
- The Story of Lee (with art by Chie Kutsuwada, 150 pages, NBM Publishing, Dec 2010)
- Yakuza Moon: the manga edition. (art by Michiru Morikawa), 190 pages, Kodansha International, Feb 2011 in Japan, June 2011 elsewhere.
- Buskers (with art by Michiru Morikawa, 130 pages, out spring 2011 in connection a film of the same name)
- Wuthering Heights (adaptation, with art by John M. Burns, 144 pages, Classical Comics, December 2011, nominated for the Stan Lee Award, 2012.
- Sweeney Todd (adaptation, with art by Declan Shalvey, 176 pages, Classical Comics, Spring 2012, Original Text, ISBN 978-1-906332-79-2, Quick Text, ISBN 978-1-906332-80-8,). Nominated for and won a Stan Lee Award, 2013.
- The Book of Five Rings: a Graphic Novel (art by Chie Kutsuwada), 160 pages manga, Shambhala, Nov 2012.
- The Demon's Sermon on the Martial Arts(art by Michiru Morikawa), 160 pages manga, Shambhala, Spring 2013.
- Parecomic: The Story of Michael Albert and Participatory Economics 220-page graphic novel with Carl Thompson. Seven Stories, May 2013. Intro by Noam Chomsky.
- Fight the Power! A Visual History of Protests Among the English Speaking Peoples, a history of 200 years of protests, New Internationalist, Oct 2013. Intro by Tariq Ali.
- The 47 Ronin A manga version of the classic Japanese tale. Art by Akiko Shimojima. English version: Shambhala, Oct 2013. Japanese version: Kodansha, Oct 2013.
- Musashi: a graphic novel A manga version of the life of Miyamoto Musashi. Art by Michiru Morikawa. Shambhala, Sept 2014.
- Cold Mountain, on Chinese mystical poets Han Shan and Shih Te, 130 pages, April 2015, Shambhala Publications.
- Goodbye God? An illustrated guide to science V religion 120 pages, April 2015, New Internationalist.
- Secrets of the Ninja, historical manga, 150 pages, July 2015, North Atlantic Books.
- Story of Lee volume 2, a 150 page long manga with (art: Nami Tamura), November 2015 from NBM Publishing, USA.
- Lafcadio Hearn’s The Faceless ghost - and other Macabre Tales. Art by Michiru Morikawa. 130 pages, Nov 2015, Shambhala Publications.
- Cigarette Girl (as editor), 250 pages, Top Shelf Productions, July 2016.
- Once Upon a Time in Morningside. Art by Hanna Stromberg. 115 pages, June 2016, BigUglyRobot Publishing.
- Breaking the 10 volume 1. Art by Michiru Morikawa.. 112 pages, July 2016, NBM Publishing, USA.
- Bushido: the Soul of Japan. Art by Akiko Shimojima. 125 pages, Aug 2016, Shambhala Publications.
- Portraits of Violence. Art by various. 115 pages, Nov 2016, New Internationalist.
- Black Ships, historical manga, 115 pages, Spring 2017, North Atlantic Books.
- Breaking the 10 volume 2. Art by Michiru Morikawa. 112 pages, Feb 2018, NBM Publishing, USA.
- The Satsuma Rebellion, historical manga. Art by Akiko Shimojima.115 pages, Spring 2018, North Atlantic Books.
- Saigo Takamori and Seinan Senso Based on the real story. Art by Akiko Shimojima. Japanese version: Kodansha, May 2018.
- Tao Te Ching: A Graphic Novel. Art by Cary Kwok. 180 pages, Dec 2018, Shambhala Publications.
- Story of Lee volume 3, a 125 page long manga with (art: Piarelle), Feb 2019 from NBM Publishing, USA.
- The Many Not the Few. Art by Robert Brown. 128 pages, May 2019, New Internationalist and GFTU.
- Tokyo Olympics Guide Art by Makiko Kodama. Japanese/English bilingual version, Kodansha, Nov 2019.
- The Garden. Art by Fumio Obata. 70 pages, May 2020, Liminal 11 publications.
- Manga Yokai Stories. Art by Inko Ai Takita. 125 pages, May 2020, Tuttle.
- The Spirit of Japan. His first book that is not a comic book, but has illustrations by Fumio Obata. 104 pages, June 2021, Liminal 11 publications.
- The Minamata Story. Art by Akiko Shimojima. 112 pages, Summer 2021, Stonebridge Press.
- Such, Such Were the Joys: graphic novel. Childhood autobiography of George Orwell, in comic book format. Art by Jaime Huxtable. 110 pages, Summer 2021, Pluto Press.
- The Tale of Genji. Art by Inko Ai Takita. 175 pages, Winter 2021, Tuttle.
- Articles and Essays. A collection of Wilson’s newspaper and magazine articles. 380 pages, Autumn 2022, Hand Readers Press.
- Mamiya's Maps: A Samurai Explores Sakhalin. Art by Akiko Shimojima. 112 pages, Winter 2022, Eostre Publications.
- Systems. A collection of reflections on our choices of political and economic systems. 240 pages, Spring 2023, Hand Readers Press.
- Clear Away the Cliches. A guide book for students about communism, capitalism and anarchism. 110 pages, Summer 2023, Hand Readers Press.
- Comic Book collection. A collection of Wilson's articles about comics. 180 pages, Winter 2023, Hand Readers Press.
- Freedom Shall Prevail: the struggle of Abdullah Ocalan and the Kurdish People. Art by Kurdish artist, Keko. 160 pages, Summer 2024, PM Press.
- Ranald MacDonald: a manga of his adventures in Japan. Art by Akiko Shimojima. 112 pages, Winter 2024, Eostre Publications.
- A to Z of Anything. A collection of thoughts on just about anything, arranged A to Z. 640 pages, Spring 2025, Hand Readers Press.
