= The Brides of Dracula =

1960 British film by Terence Fisher

- US theatrical release poster
- Directed by: Terence Fisher
- Screenplay by: Jimmy Sangster; Peter Bryan; Edward Percy; Uncredited: Anthony Hinds
- Based on: Doctor Van Helsing by Bram Stoker
- Produced by: Anthony Hinds
- Starring: Peter Cushing; Martita Hunt; Freda Jackson; Yvonne Monlaur
- Cinematography: Jack Asher
- Edited by: Alfred Cox
- Music by: Malcolm Williamson
- Production company: Hammer Film Productions
- Distributed by: Rank Film Distributors (UK); Universal International (US)
- Release date: 15 June 1960 (US)
- Running time: 85 minutes
- Country: United Kingdom
- Language: English
- Budget: £120,000
- Box office: 1,266,561 admissions (France)

The Brides of Dracula is a 1960 British supernatural gothic horror film produced by Hammer Film Productions. Directed by Terence Fisher, the film stars Peter Cushing, David Peel, Freda Jackson, Yvonne Monlaur, Andrée Melly, and Martita Hunt. The film is a sequel to the 1958 film Dracula (known in the US as Horror of Dracula), though the character of Count Dracula does not appear in the film. Filming began Jan. 26, 1960 and ended on March 18. The film premiered in the UK on July 7, 1960 at the Marble Arch Odeum, and was released theatrically on Aug. 29th, and in the US on June 15, 1960 on a double bill with The Leech Woman.

== Plot ==
En route to taking up a position in Transylvania, French schoolteacher Marianne Danielle is abandoned at a village inn by her coach driver. Ignoring the warnings of the locals, she accepts the offer of Baroness Meinster to spend the night at her castle. The Baroness's son, Baron Meinster, is said to be insane and kept confined. After sneaking into his quarters to meet him, she is shocked to find the Baron chained up to a wall. He says that his mother has usurped his rightful lands and pleads for Marianne's help. She steals the key to his chain from the Baroness' bedroom and frees him.

The Baron later kills his mother and drinks her blood. Marianne flees into the night upon seeing this, while the castle's servant Greta blames the dead Baroness for having allowed the baron to be turned into a vampire by Dracula. After chaining the Baron, the Baroness had been luring girls to feed him. Despite knowing the evil he intends for the village, Greta remains loyal to the Baron.

Exhausted, Marianne is found by Doctor Van Helsing the following morning and does not remember the previous night. He escorts her to the school where she is to be employed. Van Helsing then reaches the village inn and finds that there is a funeral in progress. A young girl has been found dead in the woods with wounds upon her throat. Father Stepnik, who had requested Van Helsing's presence, joins the doctor in his investigation, and the two try to dissuade the girl's father from burying her. Unfortunately, he does not listen, and she becomes a vampire. Stepnik and Van Helsing go to the cemetery that night, only to find Greta encouraging the girl to rise from her grave. The men try to stop them, but Greta holds them off, allowing the girl to flee.

Van Helsing goes to the castle and discovers the Baroness, now risen as a vampire herself, and the Baron. After a brief scuffle, the Baron flees, abandoning his mother. Knowing that the transformation was the Baron's revenge on his mother for locking him up, Van Helsing takes pity on her and kills her with a wooden stake the next morning. The Baron, meanwhile, visits Marianne and asks her to marry him. She accepts, much to the envy of her roommate Gina. The Baron later appears in Gina's room and drains her of her blood.

The next day, Van Helsing inspects Gina's body and orders that it be placed in a horse stable under constant vigilance. That night, Marianne guards the corpse. She is with the stable keeper, Severin, who is eventually killed by a vampire bat. A vampirised Gina then rises from her coffin. While approaching Marianne with words of contrition and love, she reveals the Baron is hiding at the old mill.

Van Helsing appears and saves Marianne from being bitten by Gina, who flees. Reluctantly, Marianne tells Van Helsing what Gina told her. He goes to the old mill and finds the Baron's coffin. He is soon confronted by both of Meinster's brides and wards them off with his cross. Greta, still human, wrestles it away from him, only to trip and plummet from the rafters to her death. The Baron then arrives, subdues Van Helsing and bites him, inflicting him with vampirism before leaving. After waking up, Van Helsing heats a metal tool in a brazier, cauterises his wound and pours holy water on it. The wound disappears and he is seemingly healed from vampirism.

Baron Meinster, meanwhile, abducts Marianne and brings her to the mill, intending to vampirise her. As the Baron attempts to hypnotise her to make her compliant to his will, Van Helsing throws the holy water at his face, which sears him like acid. The Baron kicks over the brazier of hot coals, starting a fire, and runs outside as the brides make their escape. Van Helsing runs to the sails and moves them to form the shadow of a cross over Baron Meinster, who is killed by his exposure to the symbol. Van Helsing comforts Marianne as the mill burns.

== Cast ==
- Peter Cushing as Doctor Van Helsing
- Yvonne Monlaur as Marianne
- David Peel as Baron Meinster
- Martita Hunt as Baroness Meinster
- Freda Jackson as Greta
- Miles Malleson as Doctor Tobler
- Henry Oscar as Herr Lang
- Mona Washbourne as Frau Lang
- Andrée Melly as Gina
- Victor Brooks as Hans
- Fred Johnson as the priest
- Michael Ripper as the coachman
- Norman Pierce as the landlord
- Vera Cook as the landlord's wife
- Marie Devereux as the village girl
- Michael Mulcaster (uncredited) as Latour
- Jill Haworth (uncredited) as a schoolgirl
- Harold Scott (uncredited) as Severin

== Background ==
After the success of Dracula, Hammer commissioned Jimmy Sangster to write a sequel titled Disciple of Dracula, about an acolyte of the vampire, with Count Dracula himself only making a cameo appearance. Sangster's script was rewritten by Peter Bryan to remove references to Dracula, while adding the character of Van Helsing. The screenplay was then further revised by Edward Percy. Reportedly, Sangster, director Terence Fisher and Cushing also were involved in the rewrites.

Producer Anthony Hinds stated: "My own personal involvement in a film like Brides was always 100 percent, not because I felt it to be my duty but because I felt very strongly that the pictures were mine. No doubt Terry [Fisher] thought they were his and Jimmy Sangster thought they belonged to him. And Peter C. knew they were his."

Peter Cushing reprises the role of Doctor Van Helsing from the first film. Christopher Lee was asked to reprise the role of Dracula but declined as he feared typecasting (he would go on to play the part again in the next film in the series, Dracula: Prince of Darkness). David Peel was cast as the replacement character Baron Meinster. Miles Malleson, who played the undertaker in the first film, appears in a different role as Doctor Tobler.

== Production ==
Filming began on 26 January 1960 at Bray Studios.

Most of the interior shots were done at Bray Studios. The exterior shooting locations were in nearby Black Park and Oakley Court.The scene in which the locks drop from Gina's coffin was derived from M. R. James's story "Count Magnus".

== Release ==
The film played in the US on a double bill with The Leech Woman on June 15, 1960. It premiered in England at the Odeon Marble Arch on 6 July 1960 and it was distributed theatrically in London on Aug. 29, 1960, also on a double bill with The Leech Woman.

== Reception ==
=== Box office ===
Kine Weekly included the film in their list of "money makers" at the British box office in 1960.

=== Critical ===
The Monthly Film Bulletin wrote: "The genuinely eerie atmosphere of traditional Vampire folk-lore continues to elude the cinema. This latest sequel in Hammer's apparently endless series adds little to the Dracula legend other than a youthful, good-looking vampire, and nothing to the familiar Hammer format of inappropriate colour and décor, a vague pretence at period and a serious surface view of the proceedings."

Bosley Crowther of The New York Times wrote: "another repetition of the standard tale of the vampire ... There is nothing new or imaginative about it."

Variety called the film "technically well-made" but thought the script "adds little to the Dracula legend and follows formula horror gimmicks," and that "it would have been considerably more scary if it had been filmed in old-fashioned black and white."

Harrison's Reports wrote that Martita Hunt and Freda Jackson were "excellent" in the film and the direction and photography were "first class," but that it was "not overly frightening."

The Radio Times Guide to Films gave the film 4/5 stars, writing: "While Christopher Lee worried about typecasting, Hammer went ahead anyway with this sequel (in name only) to its huge 1958 hit Dracula. Anaemic David Peel as Baron Meinster is a poor substitute for Lee's more full-blooded undead Count, but that's the only point of contention in a classic Terence Fisher-directed shocker. The marvellous atmosphere drips with a lingering gothic ghoulishness, the sexuality is remarkably upfront for its time, and the climax set in the shadow of a moonlit windmill is the stuff of fairy tale nightmare."

Leslie Halliwell said: "The best of the Hammer Draculas, with plenty of inventive action, some classy acting and good sense of place and period."

The Brides of Dracula holds a score of 79% on Rotten Tomatoes, based on 19 reviews.

=== Home media ===
- A region 1 DVD edition of the film (in a two double-sided disc box set, along with seven other Hammer classics originally distributed by Universal International) was released on 6 September 2005. This set was re-released on Blu-ray on 13 September 2016.
- A region 2 DVD edition of the film was released on 15 October 2007.
- A region B Blu-ray/DVD Double Play was released on 26 August 2013. In this release, the original aspect ratio was overcropped from 1.66 to 2.0.

== In other media ==
- The Brides of Dracula was adapted into a 15-page comics story by Steve Moore and John Stokes, which was published in two parts in Halls of Horror issues #27–28, published in 1983 by Quality Communications.
- The film is visible playing on a screen in The Matrix Reloaded (2003). Ironically as a homage to Monica Bellucci (who plays Persephone), and her role as one of Dracula's brides in Bram Stoker's Dracula (1992 film).

== See also ==
- Vampire films
- Dracula (Hammer film series)
- Hammer filmography
