= Jon Haward =

British comics artist

- Born: 1965 Norwich, Norfolk
- Died: 30 April 2024 (aged 58)
- Area: Artist

Jonathan Haward (b. 1965, Norwich, UK; d. 30 April 2024) was a British comics artist. He illustrated Teenage Mutant Ninja Turtles, Judge Dredd, Sinister Dexter and Biker Mice from Mars, among others.

== Biography ==
Haward was born in Norwich and, while at art college in Lowestoft, he sent out samples of his comics to publishers. Dez Skinn put him in touch with David Lloyd who provided advice on his art and he also met artist David Pugh, who would suggest him as a fill-in artist on Dan Dare where he started in 1990.

He first got his break at 2000 AD in 1993 on a Judge Dredd story written by Garth Ennis.

Haward was also the artist on Classical Comics' adaptations of Shakespeare's Macbeth and The Tempest, moved into the role of art direction for the Hamlet adaptation, providing character designs and rough page outlines for artist David Lorenzo to work with.

Outside of comics he provided illustrations for a range of projects, including the 2009 British Comedy Awards.

== Bibliography ==
Comics work includes:

- Judge Dredd:
  - "Barfur" (with Garth Ennis, in 2000 AD No. 827, March 1993, collected in Judge Dredd: The Complete Case Files 18, Rebellion Developments, 2011, ISBN 978-1-907992-25-4)
  - "Tour of Duty: Lust in the Dust" (with Robbie Morrison, in 2000 AD #1672–1673, February 2010)
  - "Fat Fathers" (with John Wagner, in 2000 AD #1694, July 2010)
- Tharg's Future Shocks (with Peter Hogan):
  - "A Kind of Hush" (in 2000 AD No. 862, 1993)
  - "Brighter Later" (in (2000AD Winter Special 1993, December 1993)
- Negative Burn No. 24, 34, 38. 45, 47, 50 (Caliber Comics, between June 1995 – May 1997)
- Biker Mice from Mars No. 7 (with Simon Anderson/Simon Furman, Marvel UK, July 1995)
- The Hell Crew: "Hell Comes to Elf-Town (with Alan Grant, in Frank Frazetta Fantasy Illustrated No. 7, Quantum Cat Entertainment, 1999)
- Sinister Dexter: "Sumo Chanted Evening" (with writer Dan Abnett and inks by John Stokes, in 2000 AD #1270, 2001)
- Tales of Telguuth (with writer Steve Moore):
  - "The Wheels of Fortune" (with inks by John Stokes, in 2000 AD #1285–1286, 2002)
  - "The Rousing of Rezik" (in 2000 AD #1287–1288, 2002)
  - "The Black Arts of Skrixlan Nort" (in 2000 AD #1329, 2003)
  - "Pagrok the Infallible" (in 2000 AD #1330–31, 2003)
  - "One Cold Winter Night…" (in 2000 AD #1332, 2003)
  - "The Iniquities of Snedron" (in 2000 AD #1333–1334, 2003)
  - "Holding the Fort" (with inks by John Stokes, in 2000 AD #1369, 2003)
- Spider-Man: "Blast From the Past" (pencils, with writer Jim Alexander, inks by John Stokes, in Spectacular Spider-Man No. 114, Panini Comics, March 2005 collected in Marvel Milestones: Captain Britain, Psylocke & Sub-Mariner, Marvel Comics, 2005)
- "Sideburns: Conjoined Sins" (with Jim Alexander, in Negative Burn #7, Desperado Publishing, July 2006)
- Tales of the Buddha (with Alan Grant, in Wasted #1–9, 2008–2011)
- Macbeth (by William Shakespeare and adapted by John McDonald, 144-page graphic novel, Classical Comics, February 2008, Original Text, ISBN 978-1-906332-03-7, Plain Text, ISBN 978-1-906332-04-4, Quick Text, ISBN 978-1-906332-05-1)
- Starscan: Millsiverse (in Zarjaz vol. 2, May 2009)
- The Tempest (by William Shakespeare and adapted by John McDonald, 144-page graphic novel, Classical Comics, September 2009, Original Text, ISBN 978-1-906332-29-7, Plain Text, ISBN 978-1-906332-30-3, Quick Text, ISBN 978-1-906332-31-0)

=== Covers ===
- Marvel Milestones: Captain Britain, Psylocke & Sub-Mariner (2005)

== Awards ==
- 2009: Macbeth won the Bronze Medal "Graphic Novel/Drawn Book – Drama/Documentary" Independent Publisher Book Award
