= The Infamous John Friend =

The Infamous John Friend is the title of both a 1909 novel and the 1959 BBC television miniseries based on it. The novel was written by Martha Roscoe Garnett (1869–1946). It is a work of historical fiction set in 1805 during the Napoleonic Wars. The title character, John Friend, is a spy in the employ of Napoleon. Originally published by G. Duckworth & Co. Ltd., London, it was reprinted in 1975 by Chivers, Bath (ISBN 0-85997-086-8).

== Television adaptation ==
The 1959 miniseries starred William Lucas in the title role and much of the music used was that of Hector Berlioz with the opening bars of the 4th movement of Harold in Italy used at the start of each of the eight half-hour episodes.

=== Cast ===
- William Lucas as John Friend
- Barry Foster as William North
- David Peel as Francois Sauvignac
- Margaret Tyzack as Mrs. Friend
- Pat Pleasence as Susan Marny
- Margaret Dale as Betty
- David Baron as Lord Combleigh
- Bernard Kay as Jack Rangsley
- Manning Wilson as William Pitt
