= Brian Lewis (illustrator) =

British illustrator

- Born: Brian Moncrieff Lewis; 3 June 1929 United Kingdom
- Died: 4 December 1978 (aged 49) United Kingdom
- Area: Artist

Brian Moncrieff Lewis (3 June 1929 – 4 December 1978) was a British science fiction illustrator, comics artist, and animator. In the 1950s, he illustrated covers for pulp magazines like New Worlds, Science Fantasy, and Science Fiction Adventures. In the 1960s, he drew adventure comic strips for Tiger, Boys' World, Lion, Hurricane, and Eagle. He also used a more cartoony style to draw humor comic strips for Wham!, Smash, Cor!!, and Buster. In the 1970s, Lewis focused on comics adaptations of television and horror film properties.

== Biography ==
Lewis served in the Royal Air Force, and became involved in science fiction fandom in the early 1950s.

His first professional illustration was for the Radio Times, and he began contributing to New Worlds in 1954, painting forty covers for the magazine. He also painted 21 covers for Science Fantasy, 19 for Science Fiction Adventures and a few for Digit Books between 1957 and 1962. His work was characterised by strong colours laid on thickly, and was influenced by surrealists Paul Klee and Max Ernst and illustrator Richard Powers.

His first work in comics was the strip Magna Carta for Lone Star in 1959. In the early 1960s, he drew adventure strips Jet Ace Logan, The Suicide Six, Paddy Ryan, Memorable Moments in Sport, and The Destroyer from the Depths for Tiger; Captain Condor for Lion; John Brody and Brett Million for Boys' World; Planet Z for Hurricane; and The Guinea Pig and Mann of Battle for Eagle. He also used a more cartoony style to draw Pest of the West and Georgie's Germs in Wham!, and Space Jinx and Charlie's Choice for Smash. He also drew the illustrations for a Supercar storybook.

Around 1966, he moved into animation, working on films such as Yellow Submarine. In the late 1960s and 1970s, he drew comics adaptations of television properties for TV21, Countdown, and TV Action. He illustrated horror adaptations for Dez Skinn's House of Hammer (including most covers for that series), as well as illustrating a number of episodes of the ongoing feature Van Helsing's Terror Tales. This latter work led to commissions for Warren Publishing's Vampirella in the United States. He also continued his illustration work with Tomboy in Cor!! and Buster, and Mark Strong in Look-in. In 1978, he had a brief stint on Dan Dare in 2000 AD, drew two strips in the Van der Valk annual, and produced some technical illustrations for Harry Harrison's book Mechanismo: An Illustrated Manual of Science Fiction Hardware.

=== Death ===
He died on 4 December 1978. His final published work appeared in Halls of Horror vol. 3, #5 (issue #29) (1984), a story originally produced in 1978.

== Awards ==
Lewis was nominated for "Favourite British Artist" in the 1978 Eagle Awards.

== Bibliography ==
Jet Ace Logan, from Tiger, 1961

=== Comics ===
- Magna Carta, in Lone Star (1959)
- Jet Ace Logan, in Tiger (1961)
- Captain Condor – Space Ship Pilot, in Lion (Dec. 1961–Jan. 1963)
- The Suicide Six, in Tiger (13 [362] Jan. 1962–1963)
- Paddy Ryan, in Tiger (1962–1963)
- Memorable Moments in Sport, in Tiger (1962–1963)
- Mann of Battle, in Eagle (1963)
- John Brody, in Boys' World (1963–1964)
- Brett Million, in Boys' World (1963–1964)
- The Destroyer from the Depths, in Tiger (1964)
- Planet Z, in Hurricane (1964)
- The Guinea Pig, in Eagle (1965)
- Pest of the West (written by Leo Baxendale), in Wham! (c. 1965–c. 1968)
- Georgie's Germs, in Wham! (c. 1965–c. 1968)
- Space Jinx, in Smash! (5 Feb. 1966–16 May 1966)
- Moon Madness (written by Alf Wallace), in Smash! (2 Apr. 1966–16 May 1966)
- Charlie's Choice, in Smash! (11 June 1966–7 Sept. 1968)
- Captain Scarlet, Countdown (29 May 1971)
- Let the Aliens Land!, in TV Action #59–66 (Apr. 1, 1972–May 20, 1972)
- The Final Climb, in TV Action #67–70 (May 27, 1972–June 17, 1972)
- Mark Strong, in Look-in #37–41 (9 Sept. 1972–7 Oct. 1972)
- Tomboy in Cor!! and Buster (1974–1976)
- Chilling Tales of Mystery from Damian Darke, in Spellbound (1976)
- "Highway of Hell" (Van Helsing's Terror Tales) (written by Steve Parkhouse), in House of Hammer #2 (Dec. 1976)
- The Legend of the 7 Golden Vampires (with Steve Moore; film adaptation), in House of Hammer #4 (Feb. 1977)
- "Malvoisin's Mirror" (Van Helsing's Terror Tales) in House of Hammer #6 (June 1977)
- The Quatermass Xperiment (with Les Lilley and Ben Aldrich; film adaptation), in House of Hammer #8–9 (July 1977–Aug. 1977)
- "Lair of the Dragon" (Van Helsing's Terror Tales) (written by Steve Moore), in House of Hammer #11 (Aug. 1977)
- "Curse of Cormac," (Van Helsing's Terror Tales) (written by Steve Parkhouse), in House of Hammer #13 (Oct. 1977)
- "Captain Radical" (written by Les Lilley), in Skateboard Special #7-22 (1 January 1978–c August 1978)
- The Reptile (with Steve Moore; film adaptation), in House of Hammer #19 (Apr. 1978)
- "The Nightmare Planet" (Dan Dare), in 2000 AD #61–63 (22 April 1978–6 May 1978)
- "International Incident" and "The Squealer," in Van der Valk annual (1978)
- "Prey for the Wolf" (written by Cary Bates), Vampirella #82 (Oct. 1979)
- "The Night Holds Terror" (Van Helsing's Terror Tales) (written by Tise Vahimagi), in Halls of Horror vol. 3, #5 (issue #29) (1984) — originally produced in 1978

=== Illustrations ===
- Radio Times (before 1954)
- 40 covers, New Worlds magazine (1954)
- 21 covers, Science Fantasy (1957–1962)
- 19 covers, Science Fiction Adventures (1957–1962)
- covers, Digit Books (1957–1962)
- c. 15 covers, House of Hammer (1976–1978)
- cover, Starlord (1978)
- technical illustrations, Mechanismo: An Illustrated Manual of Science Fiction Hardware (written by Harry Harrison) (Reed Books, 1978) ISBN 0-89169-504-4
- cover illustration, The Wall of Years (written by Andrew M. Stephenson) (Orbit Books, 1979) ISBN 9780708880432
