= House of Hammer =

British magazine

- Editor: Dez Skinn (1976–1978); Dave Reeder (1982–1984)
- Staff writers: Tise Vahimagi, Denis Gifford, John Brosnan, Barry Pattison, Steve Moore, Ramsey Campbell, Mike Parry and David Pirie
- Categories: Horror
- Frequency: Monthly (1976–1978); Bimonthly (1982–1984)
- Publisher: Top Sellers Ltd. (1976–1978); Quality Communications (1982–1984)
- Founder: Dez Skinn
- First issue: October 1976; 49 years ago
- Final issue Number: 1984; 30
- Company: Williams Publishing
- Country: United Kingdom

The House of Hammer was a British black-and-white magazine featuring articles and comics related to the Hammer Film Productions series of horror and science fiction films. The brainchild of Dez Skinn, almost every issue of the magazine featured a comics adaptations of a Hammer film, as well as an original comics backup story, such as the long-running feature Van Helsing's Terror Tales.

Contributors to the magazine included some of the UK's top comics talents, such as Steve Moore, Brian Bolland, John Bolton, Trevor Goring, David Lloyd, John Stokes, and Brian Lewis. Lewis painted most of the covers, usually featuring the Hammer film being adapted in comics form in the interior pages. Regular columns by Denis Gifford and Ramsey Campbell were also part of the mix.

Known colloquially as "HoH", the magazine endured a few name changes, becoming Hammer's House of Horror, then Hammer's Halls of Horror, and then simply Halls of Horror. (Adding to the confusion, the U.S. edition of the magazine was originally known as House of Horror.) HoH was published from 1976 to 1978, went on hiatus for more than three years, and then returned from 1982 to 1984. Originally published by Williams Publishing (formerly known as Thorpe & Porter), the British publishing arm of Warner Communications, the magazine was later produced by Skinn's own company, Quality Communications. It published 30 issues in all.

In assessing HoH, media historian David J. Howe notes that:

The format that Dez instigated: reviews, photographs, features and news on all aspects of the genre (covering films, television, magazines, books and fan-related happenings) is still with us today. . . . House of Hammer was one of the best magazines of its time, and is fondly remembered by all who bought it. It had a style and a look all of its own, and the combination of Brian Lewis' covers and John Bolton's comic adaptations made it an essential collector's item for all fans of fantasy artwork.

== Publication history ==
=== Origins ===
Before coming to Williams Publishing, Skinn had been an editor at IPC Magazines, where in 1975 he created and edited a horror/science fiction-themed magazine called The Buster Book of Spooky Stories (which Skinn had originally wanted to call "Chiller" and which only lasted two issues).

=== Warner/Williams ===
When Skinn moved to Williams in 1976, one of the other publications Skinn oversaw was the fold-out poster magazine Monster Mag. Frustrated by the lack of editorial pages in that publication, Skinn revived his Chiller idea with the new company. Realizing, however, that the Columbia-Warner House building where he worked was down the street from the Hammer Film Productions offices, he decided to make his new magazine tie in with Hammer films. Hammer's script editor, Christopher Wicking, was a comics fan familiar with Skinn's work, and through Wicking and other connections, a licensing deal was made and The House of Hammer was born.

The House of Hammer debuted as a monthly in October 1976, published by Top Sellers Ltd, a Thorpe & Porter imprint. The magazine was distributed nationally in the United Kingdom through newsagent's shops.

The House of Hammer was given the 1977 Eagle Award for "Favourite Professional British Comic Publication."

The House of Hammer was again nominated for "Favourite Professional British Comic Publication" at the 1978 Eagle Awards, losing out to Starburst (another Dez Skinn creation).

=== Attempt to reach North American market ===
Following its success in the United Kingdom, editor Dez Skinn sought to expand The House of Hammer into the North American market. In early 1978, the magazine secured U.S. distribution through publisher/distributor Curtis Circulation, which – because Hammer Films were not as culturally recognised in the US as they were in the UK – asked that the magazine be retitled House of Horror for American readers. Around 200,000 copies of the debut U.S. issue were printed, with a second already at press, when American James Warren's Warren Publishing — publisher of Creepy, Eerie, and Vampirella — objected that the title infringed one of its trademarks. According to editor Skinn, Warren subsequently claimed prior ownership of the House of Horror name and produced a 500-copy "ashcan" edition to secure the trademark. Skinn alleged that this ashcan was merely a mock-up or dummy publication, containing no new comics material and created solely as a legal manoeuvre to block the British magazine’s U.S. entry.

Skinn’s longterm solution to the issue was to permanently retitle the magazine Halls of Horror. In the short term, in order to avoid pulping the already printed stock, Skinn initially considered printing over the “House of” section of the masthead with “Halls of”, which would have cost around £1,000. However, a similar amount was then offered to Warren to licence the disputed House of Horror title for two months. Only the first U.S. issue is known to have been distributed before the rebranding. (The cover artwork prepared for the debut U.S. issue was later reused for the British edition’s issue #17, February 1978.) The British edition adopted the transitional title Hammer’s House of Horror with issue #19 (April 1978), and beginning with issue #20 (May 1978), both the British and U.S. editions appeared under the unified title Hammer’s Halls of Horror.

=== First cancellation ===
The magazine lasted till issue #23 (July 1978) before it was abruptly cancelled when Warner Communications sold its publishing division to W. H. Allen & Co., which decided to close the whole operation down. (The cover for the unpublished issue #24, originally scheduled for Sept. 1978, was revealed in a later issue of the revived magazine.)

Skinn bought the rights to HoH magazine from his former employer, along with around 10,000 unsold copies of various editions. However, this required him to spend the entire production and editorial budget allocated to the fourth edition of Starburst. Consequently, Skinn found himself the owner of the UK’s only two professionally published genre magazines, but without the financial resources to publish either.

=== Quality Communications ===
The title returned in late 1982/early 1983 on a bimonthly schedule. Simply titled Halls of Horror, it was published by Skinn's own Quality Communications and edited by Dave Reeder. The first issue was a new #24, an all-comics special mostly filled with reprints from earlier issues. As Hammer Films had gone out of business in 1979, this second iteration of the magazine moved away from Hammer specifically, covering horror (and science fiction) films more generally.

Quality's Halls of Horror lasted seven issues through issue #30 (1984), plus a Dracula comics special.

=== Publication details ===
The magazine's volume numbers changed every 12 issues; volume 2 started with issue #13 (Oct. 1977), and volume 3 started with issue #25 (Jan. 1984).

- The House of Hammer (issues #1–18, Oct. 1976–Mar. 1978), Top Sellers Ltd. (General Books)
- Hammer's House of Horror (issue #19, Apr. 1978), Top Sellers Ltd. (General Books)
- Hammer's Halls of Horror (issues #20–23, May 1978–Aug. 1978), Top Sellers Ltd. (Thorpe & Porter)
- Halls of Horror (issues #24-30 [e.g., vol.2, #12, and vol. 3, #1-6], 1982–1984), Quality Communications

== Columns ==
- Golden Age of Horror by Denis Gifford
- History of Hammer by Denis Gifford and then Bob Sheridan
- Campbell's Comments by Ramsey Campbell — in the Quality Communications era
- Effectively Speaking by John Brosnan
- Horror Around the World by Barry Pattison
- Post Mortem
- Answer Desk — answers to readers' questions
- Media Macabre — news section

== Features ==
Comics adaptations of Hammer Productions films were featured in almost every issue. Editor Skinn made a point of basing the adaptations on the original film scripts rather than the finished movie (thus some adaptations contained scenes that did not make it to the final film as it was released). Steve Moore handled many of the script adaptations. Skinn had a very specific idea for the kind of comics art he was looking for in the magazine, at first leaning toward Spanish artists like Carlos Ezquerra, Esteban Maroto, Luis Bermejo, Blas Gallego, Pepe González, and Alberto Cuyas. (The UK was a popular market for Spanish artists as the exchange rate meant the work paid well.) But as things evolved, Skinn found UK artists up to the task and most comics in HoH ended up being illustrated by Britons, such as John Bolton, Brian Lewis, Paul Neary, Trevor Goring, and David Jackson. Ultimately, the magazine adapted 18 Hammer films into comics form.

Van Helsing's Terror Tales was also a regular backup comics feature, featuring stories by Steve Moore, Steve Parkhouse, Bernie Wrightson, and others; and art by such creators as Angus McKie, Trevor Goring, Brian Lewis, John Bolton, Martin Asbury, Dave Gibbons, Joe Colquhoun, Steve Parkhouse, and Bernie Wrightson. Van Helsing's Terror Tales appeared in issues #1-6, 9, 11-13, 15-24, and 29; a Van Helsing's History of Horror story appeared in issue #7.

The first three issues of House of Hammer featured a serialized comics "sequel" to the 1974 Hammer film Captain Kronos – Vampire Hunter, written by Steve Moore and illustrated by Ian Gibson.

Issue #6 featured the adaptation of Dracula: Prince of Darkness (1966), by Donne Avenell and John Bolton, which included the character of Father Shandor (spelled "Sandor" in the film's credits). Father Shandor, Demon Stalker, written by Steve Moore, then became a recurring feature in House of Hammer, appearing in issues #8, 16, 21, and 24. That feature moved over to the Quality Communications anthology comics title Warrior in 1982–1984.

In 1977–1978, in between Judge Dredd assignments for IPC Magazines, Brian Bolland contributed to House of Hammer, having been introduced to the magazine through Trevor Goring, who had adapted The Plague of the Zombies and asked Bolland to ink it. Soon, Bolland was asked to draw Vampire Circus, and he "pile[d] on the gore" for his first Hammer horror adaptation – although he found much of the "blood painted out" in the printed version.

Issue #18 (Mar. 1978) featured a 13-page reprint story, "Frankenstein, The Werewolf, Dracula", by American comics superstar Neal Adams (with inks by Dick Giordano and Terry Austin). The story had been originally produced in 1975 for a Power Records (Peter Pan records) book and record set, and was later expanded (to 42 pages), translated, and published in the French magazine L'Écho des Savanes Spécial U.S.A. #5 (Editions du Fromage, 1978). Adams reprinted the expanded story in his own series, Echo of Futurepast; the collected 42-page story was reprinted in Vanguard Publishing's Monsters in 2003.

David Lloyd's adaptation of Quatermass 2, titled "Enemy from Space (Quatermass II)", in issue #23 (July 1978), was Lloyd's first major work in comics.

In late 1978, Skinn moved to Marvel UK. Many of the British creators he brought to Marvel UK to create original material were people he had already worked with on The House of Hammer. (Meanwhile, Hammer Film Productions went bankrupt and shut down in 1979.)

When the magazine returned in 1982, issue #24 was a 48-page all-comics issue, featuring reprints from issues #2, 4, 6, 8, 9, 11, and 13. A number of Van Helsing's Terror Tales were reprinted, as were the adaptations of The Legend of the 7 Golden Vampires and The Quatermass Xperiment.

Issues #25 and 26 featured the magazine's first adaptation of a non-Hammer Productions Film: Roy Ward Baker's The Monster Club (1981). Adapted by Skinn, the 25-page story (divided into two parts) was mostly illustrated by John Bolton, with four pages by David Lloyd. The strip was originally produced in 1980 as a promotional tool for the film, and had been published in a publication called The Monster Club magazine.

Quality's final publication related to Halls of Horror was a 48-page Dracula Comics Special, published in April 1984. It reprinted the 21-page adaptation of Hammer's 1958 Dracula film, by Dez Skinn and Paul Neary; and the 15-page adaptation of Dracula: Prince of Darkness, by Donne Avenell and John Bolton; it also included a 6-page John Bolton "Dracula Sketchbook."

== Hammer films comics adaptations ==
Movie title	Issue #	Adaptation	Artist(s)	Page count	Notes
Dracula (1958)	1	Dez Skinn	Paul Neary	21	Three chapters: "Part One: Castle Dracula", "Part Two: The Curse Spreads", "Part Three: The Final Chase"
The Curse of Frankenstein (1957)	2–3	Donne Avenell	Alberto Cuyas	20	Adaptation based on the John Burke novelization; told in two parts
The Legend of the 7 Golden Vampires (1973)	4	Steve Moore	Brian Lewis	15	Reprinted in issue #24
Moon Zero Two (1969)	5	Paul Neary	Paul Neary	14	
Dracula: Prince of Darkness (1966)	6	Donne Avenell	John Bolton	15	Source:
Twins of Evil (1971)	7	Chris Lowder	Blas Gallego	18	
The Quatermass Xperiment (1955)	8–9	Les Lilley and Ben Aldrich	Brian Lewis	16	Told in two parts; reprinted in issue #24
The Curse of the Werewolf (1961)	10	Steve Moore	John Bolton	15	Source:
The Gorgon (1964)	11	Scott Goodall	Trevor Goring (pencils); Alberto Cuyas (inks)	7	Part one
The Gorgon (1964)	12	Scott Goodall	Alberto Cuyas	10	Part two
The Plague of the Zombies (1966)	13	Steve Moore	Trevor Goring (pencils); Brian Bolland (inks)	13	Source:
One Million Years B.C. (1966)	14	Steve Moore	John Bolton	15	
The Mummy's Shroud (1967)	15	Donne Avenell	David Jackson	12	
Vampire Circus (1972)	17	Steve Parkhouse	Brian Bolland	15	Source:
The Reptile (1966)	19	Steve Moore	Brian Lewis	12	
Captain Kronos – Vampire Hunter (1974)	20	Steve Moore	Steve Parkhouse	12	
The Mummy (1959)	22	Steve Moore	David Jackson	12	
Quatermass 2 (1957)	23	Steve Parkhouse	David Lloyd	15	Adaptation titled "Enemy from Space (Quatermass II)"
The Quatermass Xperiment (1955)	24	Les Lilley and Dez Skinn	Brian Lewis	16	Told in two parts; Reprinted from issues #8–9
The Monster Club (1981)	25	Dez Skinn	John Bolton	12	Not a Hammer film; told in two parts.
The Monster Club (1981)	26	Dez Skinn	John Bolton (9 pp.); David Lloyd (4 pp.)	13	Not a Hammer film; told in two parts.
The Brides of Dracula (1960)	27–28	Steve Moore	John Stokes	15	Originally intended for issue #24 (1978); told in two parts

== Collections ==
In 1985, Eclipse Comics published two issues of John Bolton's Halls of Horror, composed of Bolton material originally published in the magazine. That same year, Eclipse also published the one-shot Brian Bolland's Black Book, which included some of Bolland's stories from the magazine.

In December 2018, Dez Skinn self-published a one-shot "issue #24" of the magazine, calling it The Unseen Halls of Horror. It featured new articles and previously published material, including Steve Moore and John Stokes's adaptation of The Brides of Dracula (seen in issues #27–28), and a Van Helsing's Terror Tales story, "The Night Holds Terror", by Tise Vahimagi and Brian Lewis (which originally ran in issue #29).

In 2020, Skinn self-published House of Hammer Collected Classics, square-bound collections of all the comics which appeared in HoH. Two purchasing options were offered: a single volume of all the comics or a five-volume trade paperback "bundle."

== Legacy ==
In 2016, the British publisher Titan Comics announced a new line of comic book adaptations of Hammer horror films. (Hammer had returned to film production in 2008.) Titan's first adaptation was of The Mummy (1959). Titled The Mummy: Palimpsest, the five-issue limited series appeared in late 2016/early 2017, written by Peter Milligan and illustrated by Ronilson Freire. The company's adaptation of Captain Kronos – Vampire Hunter (1974) was a four-issue limited series published from October 2017 to January 2018. It was written by Dan Abnett and drawn by Tom Mandrake.

== See also ==
- Cinefantastique
- Famous Monsters of Filmland
- Fangoria

== Sources ==
- The House of Hammer at the Grand Comics Database (Top Sellers Ltd./General Books)
- Hammer's Halls of Horror at the Grand Comics Database (General Books)
- Hammer's Halls of Horror at the Grand Comics Database (Thorpe & Porter)
- Halls of Horror at the Grand Comics Database (Quality Communications)
- Skinn, Dez. "Getting on track with The House of Hammer", DezSkinn.com.
- Skinn, Dez. "House of Hammer Volume Two", DezSkinn.com.
- Skinn, Dez. "The End of HoH", DezSkinn.com.
