= Ferenc Pinter =

Italian painter and illustrator (1931-2008)

Ferenc Pinter (31 October 1931 – 28 February 2008) was an Italian painter and illustrator.

== Biography ==
Pinter was born at Alassio, Liguria, to Hungarian father and Italian mother. His name was spelled Pintér Ferenc in Hungarian and pronounced [ˈpinteːr ˈfɛrɛnts]: he signed most of his works with the Hungarian name order; however in Italy he was known as Ferenc Pintér with the accent over the second e often dropped to avoid confusion. In 1940 his family moved to Budapest where his father received health treatments. Orphaned, Pinter tried to enter the Academy of Fine Arts in Budapest, but he was not admitted for his divergence with the communist ideas of the time. After the 1956 Hungarian Revolution, he fled to Italy. There, in Milan, he was commissioned for a series of advertisement illustrations and posters until, in 1960, he entered the Mondadori publisher with which he collaborated for 32 years.

Pinter realized numerous covers for Mondadori books and magazines, such as Segretissimo (a spy stories series, 14 covers), as well as Maigret and Agatha Christie translations and for Oscar Mondadori (the most sold Italian pocket series). His favoured technique was tempera.

In 1989 he painted the 22 Tarot Triumphs published by Lo Scarabeo of Turin, with a foreword by art historian Federico Zeri, followed by 56 Minor Arcana (2000–2002) from the same publisher.
