= David Peel (actor) =

English actor (1920–1981)

David Peel from The Brides of Dracula

David Peel (19 June 1920 – 4 September 1981) was an English film and television actor.

== Career ==
He was born in London on 19 June 1920. He attended the Royal Academy of Dramatic Art and went on to act in several television productions such as The Diary of Samuel Pepys and an adaptation of Michael Voysey's play A Woman of Property. In the play Peel portrayed the piece's villain, for which he received both praise and criticism.

Peel also took parts in theatre and film. In 1960, he was cast in the starring role of Baron Meinster in Hammer Film Productions’ The Brides of Dracula. After appearing in The Hands of Orlac later in the year, he retired from the film industry and became an estate agent and antiques dealer. He died in London on 4 September 1981 aged 61.

== Selected roles ==
=== Film ===
- Squadron Leader X (1943)
- We Dive at Dawn (1943)
- Escape to Danger (1943)
- They Who Dare (1954)
- The Brides of Dracula (1960)
- The Hands of Orlac (1960)

=== Television ===
- Vanity Fair (1956-1957, as George Osborne)
- The Silver Mask (1957)
- A Woman of Property (1957, as Francis Richmond)
- The Diary of Samuel Pepys (1958, as Duke of York)
- The Infamous John Friend (1959, as Francois Sauvignac)

=== Theater ===
- A Comedy of Errors (1956, as Antipholi)
