= Il Giallo Mondadori =

Series of mystery novels by Arnoldo Mondadori Editore

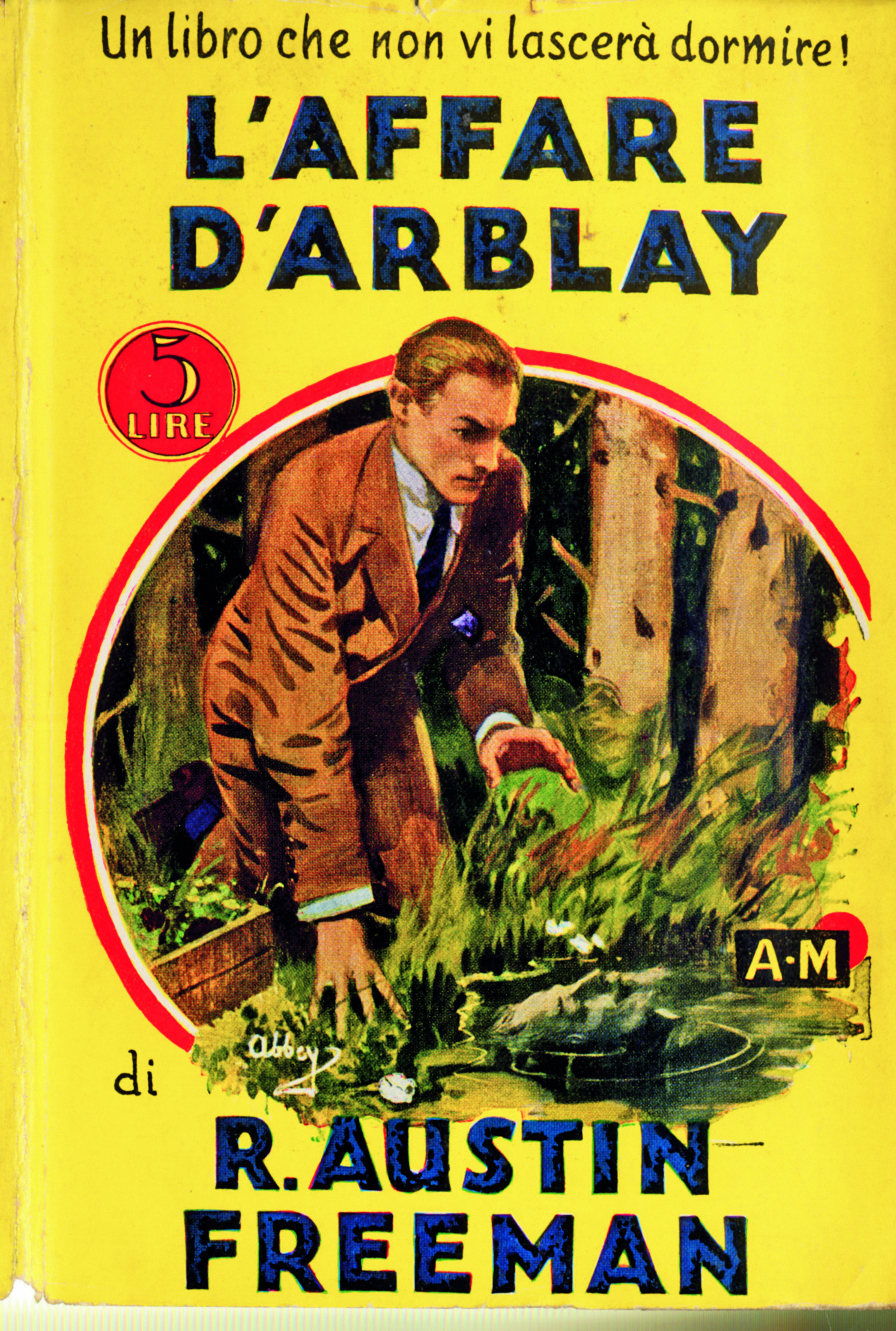
Cover of the Italian translation of the novel The D'Arblay Mystery by Richard Austin Freeman, published at no. 23 of the series in 1931.

Il Giallo Mondadori is an Italian series of mystery/crime novels published by Arnoldo Mondadori Editore since 1929.

A 1956 issue of Il Giallo Mondadori.

Their original title was I libri gialli, where giallo in Italian means "yellow", a reference to the color of the cover background. The title was changed to I gialli Mondadori in 1946. The series had a weekly periodicity for decades, while currently is published every fifteen days.

In its long life, the series spawned several companion series, the most successful being I classici del Giallo, which is still ongoing and publishes reprints.

The series usually features translations of American novels, although Italian and European authors have become more frequent starting from the 1990s; authors published include Agatha Christie, Rex Stout, Edgar Wallace, Erle Stanley Gardner (the first issue was The Case of Silent Partner), John Dickson Carr, Ed McBain, Dan Simmons, Seicho Matsumoto, Cornell Woolrich, Donald E. Westlake, Bill Pronzini, John D. MacDonald, Lilian Jackson Braun, Loriano Macchiavelli, John Katzenbach, Giulio Leoni, Carlo Lucarelli and many others. There was usually a short appendix containing articles and short stories (including, for many years, stories from the Ellery Queen's Mystery Magazine). In the pulp collection Il Giallo Mondadori presenta (edited by Alan D. Altieri) authors published include the Italian horror writer Alda Teodorani, and Claudia Salvatori.

Cover artists include Kurt Caesar and Carlo Jacono, who realized the covers until 1986.

== See also ==
- Arnoldo Mondadori Editore
- Sandrone Dazieri, chief editor 2000-2004
