= Alda Teodorani =

Italian writer (born 1968)

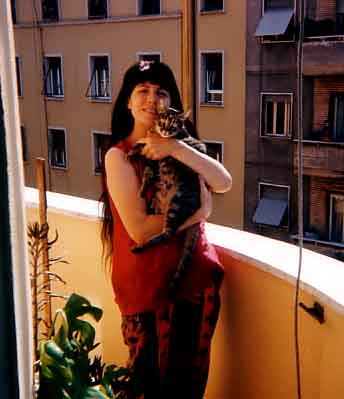
- Alda Teodorani with her cat Pumino
- Born: 1968 (age 57–58); Lugo, Emilia-Romagna, Italy

Alda Teodorani (born 1968) is an Italian writer. She has been defined as the "queen of Italian dark". The director Dario Argento has said "Alda Teodorani's stories are like my deepest nightmares." She made her debut in 1990 with the publication of Non hai capito in the Nero Italiano 27 racconti metropolitani anthology.

== Biography ==
Teodorani was born in Lugo.

In 1991, she founded "Gruppo 13" a group of authors of thrillers and noir stories with Loriano Macchiavelli and Carlo Lucarelli. In the same year, she moved to Rome with Fabio Giovannini and Antonio Tentori, where she founded the Neor-noir movement which theorises a narrative from the individual standpoint of the assassin. In 1997, one of her stories was included in the Gioventù Cannibale collection (Einaudi) published in Italian, French and Spanish. It became a literary sensation and the start of the Italian "Cannibal-pulp" movement.

In 2002, Teodorani published a book in France unreleased in Italy, Belve-Cruatés, with Editions Naturellement which was then included in the group of books in competition for the Prix Rosny-Aîné. Published the following year in Italy with the title Belve (Beasts), the book was the subject of two degree theses and a presentation at the annual conference of the American Association for Italian Studies, and at the Canadian Society for Italian Studies in 2017 at the Ohio State University with the title Through the eyes of the beast: From Local Environmental Dystopia to Transnational Utopia by Danila Cannamela from the University of St Thomas.

Teodorani has also contributed to the creation and is a member of the scientific committee of the RomaNoir congress (first held in 2004) organised by the department of philological, linguistic, and literary studies of La Sapienza university in Rome. In 2005, she held a seminary about her writing at the university of Wurzburg in Germany.

Some of her stories have been adapted for a DVD called Appuntamenti Letali (Lethal appointments) containing short and medium length films published by Filmhorror.com. In 2008 the author published I sacramenti del male with Giallo Mondadori and collaborated with the experimental electronic music band Le forbici di Manitù. This collaboration gave rise in 2010 to a CD including a novella by Teodorani, L'Isola, which in 2011 was released in France by Les éditions de l'Antre.

At the start of 2016 Teodorani published a non-genre book with Stampa Alternativa set in Emilia-Romagna during the seventies called Gramsci in cenere, which in May 2016 won the award for the best book of its kind from the "Premio Bancarella nelle scuole".

== Bibliography ==
- Giù, nel delirio, Granata Press, 1991
- Le radici del male, Granata Press, 1993
  - Le radici del male, Addictions, 2002
    - Le radici del male, Mezzotints, 2013 (e-book)
- Fiore oscuro, Il Minotauro, 1995
- Il segno di Caino, Datanews, 1995
- Labbra di sangue, Datanews, 1997
- Sesso col coltello, Stampa Alternativa, 2001
  - Sesso col coltello, Delos, 2016 (e-book)
- Organi, Stampa Alternativa, 2002
- Belve - Cruautés, Naturellement, 2002
  - Belve, Addictions, 2003
    - Belve, Kipple, 2008 (e-book)
      - Belve Final Cut, Cut Up, 2011
- Sacramenti, Mondadori, 2008
- La Signora delle torture, Addictions, 2004
  - La signora delle torture, Delos, 2016 (e-book)
- Quindici desideri, Dario Flaccovio Editore, 2004 (book + CD)
  - Alda Teodorani presents 15 desideri, Deny Everythings, 2011 (book + CD)
    - Quindici desideri, Delos Digital, 2016 (e-book)
- Incubi, Halley Edizioni, 2005
- Bloody Rainbow, Hacca, 2006
- L'isola, Snowdonia, 2910 (CD + book) with Le forbici di Manitù (music) and Emanuela Biancuzzi (illustrations)
  - L'Isola, Les Editions de l'Antre, 2011
- Gramsci in cenere, Stampa Alternativa, 2016
- La Collezionista di organi, Profondo Rosso, 2016
- Snake : Il vampiro della città morta, Watson Edizioni, 2017
- Uomini senza, Fahrenheit Edizioni, 2018

== Sources ==
- Agnieszka Domaradzka, Le sfumature del nuovo noir italiano Dal giallo al nero, in Romanica Università Adam Mickiewicz di Poznan, 2 (3)/2011. (it)
- Liliana Talamo, Il corpo postumano nella letteratura italiana contemporanea come metafora di dolore e incomunicabilità, in Bollettino '900, n. 1-2 I-II Semestre, 2010.(it)
- Yolanda Romano Martín, Asesinas, psicópatas y desequilibradas. La maldad en femenino en el noir italiano. En Locas, escritoras y personajes femeninos cuestionando las normas : XII Congreso Internacional del Grupo de Investigación Escritoras y Escrituras (pages 1354–1369), Sevilla: Alciber., 2015 (es)
- Stefanie Rubenis, Quindici desideri von Alda Teodorani in Postmoderne Lyrik- Lyrik in der postmoderne Studien zu den romanischen literature Di Gerhard Penzkofer (De), Königshausen & Neumann, 2007
- Stefanie Rubenis Gewalt am Frauenkörper in der scrittura femminile nera. Zum Werk von Laura Pugno, Alda Teodorani und Isabella Santacroce Lang, 2012, ISBN 9783631618158
- Monica Cristina Storini, Spazi reali, spazi simbolici: corpo e scrittura nel noir al femminile, pag.89-112, in Elisabetta Mondello, (a cura di), Roma Noir 2007 - Luoghi e nonluoghi del romanzo contemporaneo, Ed. Robin, 2007 (It)
- Monica Cristina Storini, Amore e morte, la passione nel noir delle donne, pag.59-61, in Elisabetta Mondello, (a cura di), Roma Noir 2009 - L'amore ai tempi del noir, Ed. Robin, 2009. (it)
