= Jen Green =

British author (born 1955)

- Born: 1955 (age 70–71)
- Education: University of Sussex
- Occupation: Author
- Writing career
- Genres: Non-fiction; children's literature

Jen Green (born 1955) is a British author of non-fiction books for children and adults. She has written over 300 titles.

== Life ==
Jen Green was born a twin and grew up in South London and Sussex. She gained her doctorate in English literature from Sussex University. After working in publishing from 1981 to 1996, she became a full-time writer. In 2012-13 she was a Royal Literary Fund Fellow at the University of Sussex. She lives by the Sussex Downs.
