= Fishboy (comics) =

British comic strip

Fishboy

Fishboy: Denizen of the Deep was a black and white comic strip appearing in the British comic book Buster between 1968 and 1975, written by Scott Goodall and drawn by John Stokes and others. As with most UK comic strips, neither the writer nor artists were credited.

The title character is a British boy who was abandoned on a desert island as a baby and survived as a feral child by learning to breathe underwater and talk to shark and other sea creatures. He also developed webbed fingers and toes which gave him the ability to swim, as fast as a car.

The strip follows his adventures as a teenager as he travels the world's seas searching for his long-lost parents and helping people in trouble.

Goodall also wrote "Kid Chameleon" for Cor!!, another comic strip featuring a feral boy on a similar quest.

Fishboy appears, dead and displayed in a case in a Scottish prison, in the 2005 comic Albion, as one of many comic book characters, who were imprisoned by the British government. He was captured off the coast of Japan. He seemingly grew more fish-like since his last appearance in Buster.

== See also ==
- Aquaman
- Namor
- Amphibian Man
- Man From Atlantis
