= Scott Goodall =

British comics writer (1935–2016)

- Born: 7 November 1935 Aberdeen, Scotland
- Died: 7 March 2016 (aged 80)
- Area: Writer
- Notable works: Fishboy

Scott Goodall MBE (7 November 1935 – 7 March 2016) was a British comics writer.

== Career ==
Goodall started out his comics career in the early-to-mid 1960s. He was part of a rotating cast of writers for the spooky strip The Strangest Stories Ever Told, published in School Friend. Goodall wrote Captain Hurricane scripts for Valiant comic from 1963 to 1976.

In 1965, he was heavily involved in the launch of TV Century 21 (TV21) with Alan Fennell and Angus Allan. Goodall wrote the Thunderbirds scripts for two years in TV21, drawn by Frank Bellamy; and also most of the scripts for Zero X, drawn by Mike Noble.

Goodall created and wrote the character Fishboy in 1968 (illustrated by John Stokes), and lesser-known characters such as Splash Gorton (illustrated by Joe Colquhoun). He also wrote Galaxus The Thing From Outer Space for Buster comic from 1968 to 1976.

Goodall's other well-known scripts include Marney the Fox and the major success Rat-Trap in Cor!! comic in 1972. In 1977 he wrote two episodes of M.A.C.H. 1 for 2000AD. He wrote the comics adaptation of the Hammer Productions film The Gorgon for House of Hammer issues #11–12, which was illustrated by Trevor Goring and Alberto Cuyas.

Goodall was a frequent contributor to the 1980s relaunch of Eagle, creating the strips Invisible Boy and Walk Or Die, and working on other strips including Manix. After Pat Mills stopped writing Charley's War for Battle Picture Weekly in 1985, Goodall took over and wrote the final episodes, set during the Second World War.

In 1981 he moved to France. He was made an MBE in 2005.
