= Alan Moore bibliography =

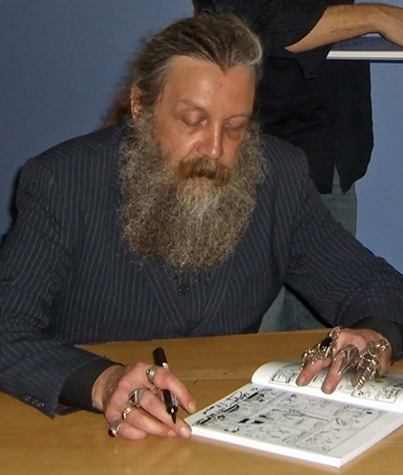
- Alan Moore in 2006
- Active period: 1970–present

Publishers
- Marvel UK: 1979–1984
- 2000 AD: 1980–1986
- DC Comics: 1984–1989
- Image Comics: 1993–2000
- America's Best Comics: 1999–2006
- Avatar Press: 2001–2019

This is a bibliography of works by British author and comic book writer Alan Moore.

== Comics ==
=== UK publishers ===
Titles published by various British publishers include:

- Embryo #1–5 (poetry-oriented fanzine edited by Moore, Northampton Arts Lab, 1970–1971)
  - In addition to the editorial duties, Moore contributed much of the poetry and artwork published in the fanzine.
  - The last issue also featured "Once There Were Dæmons", a short comic story written and drawn by Moore.
- Weird Window #1 (as artist, one-page illustration for a short story by David A. Riley in the horror fanzine, 1970)
- ANoN #1–5: "Anon E. Mouse" (script and art, strip in the monthly newspaper, 1974–1975)
- Back Street Bugle (one-page strips in the fortnightly and later monthly newspaper):
  - "The Adventures of St. Pancras Panda" (script and art, in #6–12, 14, 16, 18, 22, 25, 1978–1979)
    - An installment of the "St. Pancras Panda" strip, written and drawn by Dick Foreman, was also published in issue #15.
    - Moore, in turn, provided the script and art for a chapter of Foreman's strip "Moeby Palliative" in the same issue.
  - "Fat Jap Defamation Funnies" (script and art, in #23, 1979)
  - "Just Another Day" (as artist, written by Dick Foreman, in #42, 1980)
- Dark Star (as "Curt Vile" — various strips in the music-themed magazine):
  - "The Avenging Hunchback" (script and art, in #19, 1979)
  - "Kultural Krime Komix!!" (script and art, in #20, 1979)
  - "Talcum Power" (script and art; co-written by Moore and Pedro Henry, in #21, 1979)
  - "Three Eyes McGurk and His Death Planet Commandos" (as artist, written by Pedro Henry, in #22–25, 1979–1980)
- Sounds (as "Curt Vile" — various strips in the weekly music-themed newspaper, Spotlight Publications):
  - Roscoe Moscow: "Who Killed Rock n' Roll?" (script and art, 31 Mar 1979–28 Jun 1980)
  - Axel Pressbutton:
    - "The Stars My Degradation" (12 Jul 1980–19 Mar 1983)
      - Episodes published between 6 Feb 1982 and 15 Jan 1983 were written by Pedro Henry and drawn by Moore.
      - All the other chapters (12 Jul 1980–5 Dec 1981 and 5 Feb 1983–19 Mar 1983) were written and drawn by Moore solo.
    - "Christmas on Depravity" (script and art; co-written by Moore and Pedro Henry, 26 Dec 1981)
    - "The Bride of Pressbutton" (script and art, 25 Dec 1982)
  - "Ten Little Liggers" (script and art, 27 Dec 1980)
  - "The Rock and Roll Zoo" (script and art, 15 Aug 1981)
- Northants Post: "Maxwell the Magic Cat" (as "Jill de Ray" — script and art, strip in the weekly newspaper, 25 Aug 1979–9 Oct 1986)
  - Moore contributed a one-page Maxwell strip for the benefit anthology volume Strip AIDS (56 pages, Willyprods/Small Time Ink, 1987, ISBN 0-9512522-0-8)
  - Another Maxwell episode, also written and drawn by Moore as "Jill de Ray", was published in the final edition of Northants Herald & Post (1 Dec 2016)
  - The initial run of Maxwell the Magic Cat strips was collected by Acme Press as:
    - Volume 1 (collects strips published between 25 August 1979, and 20 June 1981, 32 pages, 1986, ISBN 1-870084-00-4)
    - Volume 2 (collects strips published between 27 June 1981 and 24 March 1983, 32 pages, 1986, ISBN 1-870084-05-5)
      - Includes the first and only episode of the Nutter's Ruin strip, written and drawn by Moore as "Curt Vile" in 1979.
      - The strip, which Moore originally pitched to Northants Post but was rejected, first saw print in Speakeasy #43 (1984)
    - Volume 3 (collects strips published between 31 March 1983 and 12 December 1984, 32 pages, 1987, ISBN 1-870084-10-1)
    - Volume 4 (collects strips published between 27 December 1984 and 9 October 1986, 32 pages, 1987, ISBN 1-870084-20-9)
- B.J. and the Bear 1982 Annual: "C.B.? – That's a Big Ten-Four!" and "Bear's Monkey Business" (three-page articles illustrated by Moore; 64 pages, Grandreams, 1981, ISBN 0-86227-032-4)
  - An extended, four-page version of "C.B.? – That's a Big Ten-Four!" was published in The Dukes of Hazzard 1983 Annual (64 pages, Grandreams, 1982, ISBN 0-8622-7074-X)
- Warrior (anthology, Quality Communications):
  - Marvelman (with Garry Leach (#1–3 and 5), Alan Davis (#4, 6–11, 13–16, 18, 20–21) and John Ridgway (#12 and 17), in #1–18 and 20–21, 1982–1984)
    - All strips except for "The Yesterday Gambit" (art by Steve Dillon, Paul Neary and Alan Davis) from issue #4 were colourised and reprinted in Miracleman #1–6 (Eclipse, 1985–1986)
    - Moore and Davis produced an additional story to serve as the framing sequence for a number of Marvelman family reprints in Marvelman Special (Quality Communications, 1984)
  - V for Vendetta (with David Lloyd, in #1–26, 1982–1985)
    - All strips were colourised and reprinted in V for Vendetta #1–7 (DC Comics, 1988–1989)
    - The song "This Vicious Cabaret" from issue #12 was recorded by David J and released on a 12-inch single V for Vendetta (Glass Records, 1984)
  - Warpsmith: "Cold War, Cold Warrior" (with Garry Leach, in #9–10, 1983)
    - Another Warpsmith story by Moore and Leach, titled "Ghostdance", was published in the first issue of the A1 anthology (Atomeka, 1989)
    - All three of these Marvelman spin-off strips were colourised and reprinted in Miracleman vol. 2 #4 (Marvel, 2014)
  - The Bojeffries Saga (with Steve Parkhouse, in #12–13 and 19–20, 1983)
    - The strips were colourised and collected by Tundra UK in The Complete Bojeffries Saga (tpb, 80 pages, 1992, ISBN 1-879450-65-8)
    - The original, black-and-white versions were collected by Top Shelf in The Bojeffries Saga (tpb, 104 pages, 2014, ISBN 1-603090-63-0)
  - Nightjar (with Bryan Talbot, a horror strip — unreleased due to Moore's fallout with Quality Communications; one episode was produced)
    - The sole episode of Nightjar created by Moore and Talbot was eventually published by Avatar in Alan Moore's Yuggoth Cultures and Other Growths #1 (2003)
    - In 2004, Avatar produced the 4-issue limited series Nightjar and a one-shot subtitled Hollow Bones, both written by Antony Johnston and drawn by Max Fiumara.
- Old Gangsters Never Die (with Lloyd Thatcher, released as part of The Sinister Ducks' March of the Sinister Ducks 7-inch single, Situation Two, 1983)
  - The 8-page strip, adapted from the Moore-written lyrics for the eponymous song, was printed in the fold-out inner sleeve of the single.
  - Reprinted in The Mammoth Book of Best Crime Comics (tpb, 480 pages, Running Press, 2008, ISBN 1-8452-9710-5)
- Fantasy Advertiser #77: "Moonstone: Tomorrow's Truth, Part Three" (with Mike Collins, strip in the fanzine, 1983)
  - Moore guest-scripted this episode of the strip from a plotline by Mike Collins.
- DC London Editions:
  - The Super Heroes 1984 Annual: "Protected Species" (two-page prose story with illustrations by Bryan Talbot; 64 pages, 1983, ISBN 0-72356-701-8)
  - Superman: Official 1985 Annual: "I Was Superman's Double!" (three-page prose story with illustrations by Bob Wakelin; 64 pages, 1984, ISBN 0-7235-6732-8)
  - Batman: Official 1985 Annual: "The Gun" (four-page prose story with illustrations by Garry Leach; 64 pages, 1984, ISBN 0-7235-6733-6)
- Harrier:
  - Conqueror (as "editorial consultant"):
    - Conqueror #1–9 (written by Martin Lock and Freeth Goodacre (#3), drawn by Dave Harwood, Kevin Hopgood (#5) and Stephen Baskerville with Paul Marshall (#6–9), 1984–1985)
    - Conqueror Universe (written by Martin Lock, drawn by Dave Harwood, Tony O'Donnell, Mike Collins, Andrew Nixon, Kevin Hopgood and Graham Bleathman, one-shot, 1985)
  - Swiftsure (as "editorial consultant", anthology):
    - Swiftsure #1–6 (1985–1986) featuring:
      - "Dandy in the Underworld" (written and drawn by Stephen Baskerville, in #1–6)
      - "Rock Solid Space Hero!" (written and drawn by Lew Stringer, in #1–6)
      - "Lieutenant Fl'ff" (written by Martin Lock, drawn by Dave Harwood (#1–2) and Mike Collins (#4–5), in #1–2 and 4–5)
      - "Ram: Assassin" (written by Martin Lock, drawn by R. F. O'Roake (#1–2) and Jeff Anderson (#3 and 5) and Tim Perkins (#6), in #1–3 and 5–6)
      - "Codename: Andromeda" (written by Bill Ryan, drawn by Dave Harwood, in #1, 3–4, 6)
      - "Forest" (written by James Hill, drawn by Kevin Hopgood, in #2 and 5)
    - Swiftsure and Conqueror #7–10 (1986) featuring:
      - "H.M.S. Conqueror" (written by Martin Lock, drawn by Dave Harwood, in #7)
      - "Dandy in the Underworld" (written and drawn by Stephen Baskerville, in #7)
      - "Ram: Assassin" (written by Martin Lock, drawn by Tim Perkins, in #7–8)
      - "Codename: Andromeda" (written by Bill Ryan, drawn by Dave Harwood, in #7 and 9–10)
      - "Lieutenant Fl'ff" (written by Martin Lock, drawn by Steve Yeowell (#8) and Dave Harwood, in #8–10)
      - "Forest" (written by James Hill, drawn by Steve Whitaker, in #8 and 10)
      - "Redfox" (written by Martin Lock, drawn by Fox and Carl Cropley, in #9)
- Knockabout:
  - Knockabout Trial Special: "Brasso with Rosie" (three-page prose story with illustrations by Savage Pencil, anthology graphic novel, 64 pages, 1984, ISBN 0-86166-012-9)
    - The story was reprinted (with new illustrations by Peter Bagge) in the second issue of the American comics anthology magazine Honk (Fantagraphics, 1987)
  - Knockabout Comics #9: "Globetrotting for Agoraphobiacs" (three-page prose story with illustrations by Eddie Campbell, anthology, 1985)
  - Outrageous Tales from the Old Testament: "Leviticus, Chapter 20" (with Hunt Emerson, anthology graphic novel, 64 pages, 1987, ISBN 0-86166-054-4)
  - Seven Deadly Sins: "Lust" (with Mike Matthews, anthology graphic novel, 64 pages, 1989, ISBN 0-86166-062-5)
- Food for Thought: "Cold Snap" (with Bryan Talbot, anthology one-shot, Flying Pig, 1985)
- Mad Dog #10: "Captain Airstrip One" (with Chris Brasted, anthology, Oddmags, 1985)
- Myra #8: "A True Story" (with Myra Hancock, five-page strip in the fanzine, Myra Magazines, 1986)
- Heartbreak Hotel (script and art, anthology, Willyprods/Small Time Ink):
  - "Letter from Northampton" (one-page strip in #1, 1988)
  - "I Can Hear the Grass Grow" (adaptation of the eponymous song in #3, 1988)
- Mad Love (publishing imprint established by Moore, his then-wife Phyllis and their mutual lover Deborah Delano):
  - AARGH!: "The Mirror of Love" (with Rick Veitch and Stephen R. Bissette, anthology one-shot, 1988)
    - Collected in Heartburst and Other Pleasures (tpb, 80 pages, King Hell, 2008, ISBN 0-9800-2060-3)
    - A separate edition in the form of a poem accompanied by José Villarrubia's photographs was published in 2004.
  - Big Numbers #1–2 (of 12) (with Bill Sienkiewicz, 1990)
    - The project was abandoned due to budgetary and personal reasons; according to Moore, he has written scripts for up to issue #5.
    - After Sienkiewicz left the project, he was replaced with Al Columbia, who reportedly destroyed all his completed artwork for issue #4.
    - In 2009, a photocopy of the complete lettered art for issue #3 was posted online.
- A1 #1–4 and A1 True Life Bikini Confidential: "The Bojeffries Saga" (with Steve Parkhouse, anthology, Atomeka, 1989–1990)
  - The strips were colourised and collected by Tundra UK in The Complete Bojeffries Saga (tpb, 80 pages, 1992, ISBN 1-879450-65-8)
  - The original, black-and-white versions were collected by Top Shelf in The Bojeffries Saga (tpb, 104 pages, 2014, ISBN 1-603090-63-0)
- Corpsemeat Comix #2: "Driller Penis: Yes... He Does What You Think He Does" (with Savage Pencil, anthology, Sympathetic Press, 1989)
- A Small Killing (with Oscar Zárate, graphic novel, hc, 96 pages, VG Graphics, 1991, ISBN 0-575-04747-X; sc, 1991, ISBN 0-5750-5023-3)
- The Comic Relief Comic (uncredited — with Melinda Gebbie, among other writers and artists, one-shot, Fleetway, 1991)
- The Risen (as artist, cover illustration for the novel, Hathor Publishing, 1994, ISBN 0-9522035-1-0)
- Hexentexts (as artist, cover illustration for the compilation album of spoken-word pieces, Codex Books, 1994)
- Kimota! #3: "The Nativity on Ice" (as "Kurt Vile" — with Bryan Talbot, one-page strip in the fanzine, Preston Speculative Fiction Group, 1995)
- It's Dark in London: "I Keep Coming Back" (with Oscar Zárate, anthology graphic novel, 120 pages, Mask Noir, 1996, ISBN 1-85242-535-0)
  - The story is sometimes referred to as a coda to Moore and Eddie Campbell's series From Hell, published between 1989 and 1996.
  - Collected in The Mammoth Book of Best Crime Comics (tpb, 480 pages, Running Press, 2008, ISBN 1-8452-9710-5)
- The Worm (24-hour comic written and drawn by various creators from a storyline by Moore, graphic novel, 64 pages, Slab-O-Concrete, 1999, ISBN 1-899866-37-X)
- Songs of the Black Würm Gism (as artist, cover illustration for the anthology featuring short tributes to H. P. Lovecraft, Oneiros Books, 2009, ISBN 1-902197-28-3)
- Dodgem Logic #1–8 (underground magazine featuring articles and comics by various contributors, including Moore; edited and published by Moore, 2009–2011)
  - Issue #2 included a free giveaway supplement in the form of an 8-page comic book written and drawn by Moore: Astounding Weird Penises #258 (2010)
- Big Nemo (with Colleen Doran, 8-page comic released via Electricomics, an open-source app for self-publishing digital comics co-founded by Moore, 2015)
- The Most Important Comic Book on Earth: "Frankly, Trevor" (with Melinda Gebbie, anthology graphic novel, 352 pages, DK Publishing, 2021, ISBN 0-7440-4282-8)

==== Marvel UK ====
Titles published by Marvel UK include:

- Frantic Winter Special: "Scant Applause Section" (as "Curt Vile" — script and art, two-page strip, 1979)
- Doctor Who Weekly (anthology; renamed Doctor Who: A Marvel Monthly starting with issue #44):
  - Doctor Who: Black Sun Rising (tpb, 116 pages, Panini, 2024, ISBN 1-80491-246-8) includes:
    - "Black Legacy" (with David Lloyd, in #35–38, 1980)
    - "Business as Usual" (with David Lloyd, in #40–43, 1980)
    - "Star Death" (with John Stokes, in #47, 1980)
    - "The 4-D War" (with David Lloyd, in # 51, 1981)
    - "Black Sun Rising" (with David Lloyd, in #57, 1981)
- Star Wars:
  - The Empire Strikes Back Monthly (anthology; renamed Star Wars Monthly starting with issue #159):
    - "The Pandora Effect" (with Adolfo Buylla, in #151, 1981)
    - "Tilotny Throws a Shape" (with John Stokes, in #154, 1982)
    - "Dark Lord's Conscience" (with John Stokes, in #155, 1982)
    - "Rust Never Sleeps" (with Alan Davis, in #156, 1982)
    - "Blind Fury" (with John Stokes, in #159, 1982)
  - All five strips were colourised and reprinted in Star Wars: Devilworlds #1–2 (Dark Horse, 1996)
  - The colourised versions of the stories from Star Wars: Devilworlds were subsequently collected in:
    - Star Wars Omnibus: Wild Space Volume 1 (tpb, 480 pages, Dark Horse, 2013, ISBN 1-6165-5146-1)
    - Star Wars: The Original Marvel Years Omnibus Volume 3 (hc, 1,104 pages, Marvel, 2015, ISBN 0-7851-9346-4)
- Not the World Cup: The Official Souvenir Brochure: "Not! The World Cup" (with Barrie Mitchell, anthology one-shot, 1982)
- Captain Britain:
  - Moore's storyline ran in short installments through several magazines of various Marvel comics reprints:
    - Marvel Super-Heroes #386 (last page) and 387–388 (with Alan Davis, 1982)
    - The Daredevils #1–11 (with Alan Davis, 1983)
    - The Mighty World of Marvel #7–13 (with Alan Davis, 1983–1984)
  - The entire storyline was collected by Marvel in Captain Britain Omnibus (hc, 688 pages, 2009, ISBN 0-7851-3760-2)
  - The storyline was also collected by Panini in two volumes as part of an effort to reprint the Captain Britain strip in its entirety:
    - Captain Britain: The Siege of Camelot (includes stories from Marvel Super-Heroes and The Daredevils, tpb, 256 pages, 2010, ISBN 1-8465-3433-X)
    - Captain Britain: End Game (includes stories from The Mighty World of Marvel, tpb, 256 pages, 2010, ISBN 1-84653-459-3)
- Night Raven:
  - Marvel Super-Heroes (illustrated prose stories in the magazine of various reprints of Marvel comics):
    - "The Cure" (illustrations by Mick Austin and Paul Neary, in #390–391, 1982)
    - "White Hopes, Red Nightmares" (illustrations by Paul Neary, in #392–393, 1982–1983)
    - "Sadie's Story" (illustrations by Paul Neary, in #394–395, 1983)
  - The Daredevils (illustrated prose stories in the magazine of various reprints of Marvel comics):
    - "The Anaesthetic, Wearing Off" (illustrations by David Lloyd, in #6, 1983)
    - "The Snow Queen" (illustrations by Alan Davis, in #7–10, 1983)
  - All five stories were collected by Marvel in Night Raven: From the Marvel UK Vaults (tpb, 280 pages, 2017, ISBN 1-3029-0462-0)
- The Daredevils #8: "Grit!" (with Mike Collins, four-page strip satirizing Roger McKenzie's and Frank Miller's stories for Daredevil, 1983)

==== IPC Media ====
Titles published by IPC Media include:

- 2000 AD (anthology):
  - Tharg's Future Shocks: "A Holiday in Hell" (with Dave Harwood, in Sci-Fi Special '80, 1980)
  - Ro-Jaws' Robo-Tales:
    - "Killer in the Cab" (with John Richardson, in #170, 1980)
    - "The Dating Game" (with Dave Gibbons, in #176, 1980)
  - The Complete Alan Moore Future Shocks (tpb, 208 pages, Rebellion, 2006, ISBN 1-904265-88-X) collects:
    - Tharg's Future Shocks:
      - "Grawks Bearing Gifts" (with Q Twark, in #203, 1981)
      - "The English/Phlondrutian Phrase Book" (with Brendan McCarthy, in #214, 1981)
      - "The Last Rumble of the Platinum Horde" (with John Higgins, in #217, 1981)
      - "They Sweep the Spaceways" (with Garry Leach, in #219, 1981)
      - "The Regrettable Ruse of Rocket Redglare" (with Mike White, in #234, 1981)
      - "A Cautionary Fable" (with Paul Neary, in #240, 1981)
      - "Mister, Could You Use a Squonge?" (with Ron Tiner, in #242, 1981)
      - "A Second Chance!" (with Jose Casanovas, in #245, 1982)
      - "Twist Ending" (with Paul Neary, in #246, 1982)
      - "Salad Days!" (with John Higgins, in #247, 1982)
      - "The Beastly Beliefs of Benjamin Blint" (with Eric Bradbury, in #249, 1982)
      - "All of Them Were Empty" (with Paul Neary, in #251, 1982)
      - "An American Werewolf in Space!" (with Paul Neary, in #252, 1982)
      - "The Bounty Hunters!" (with John Higgins, in #253, 1982)
      - "The Wages of Sin!" (with Bryan Talbot, in #257, 1982)
      - "Return of the Thing!" (with Dave Gibbons, in #265, 1982)
      - "Skirmish!" (with Dave Gibbons, in #267, 1982)
      - "The Writing on the Wall!" (with Jesus Redondo, in #268, 1982)
      - "The Wild Frontier!" (with Dave Gibbons, in #269, 1982)
      - "The Big Day" (with Robin Smith, in #270, 1982)
      - "One Christmas During Eternity!" (with Jesus Redondo, in #271, 1982)
      - "No Picnic!" (with John Higgins, in #272, 1982)
      - "The Disturbed Digestions of Dr. Dibworthy" (with Dave Gibbons, in #273, 1982)
      - "Sunburn" (with Jesus Redondo, in #282, 1982)
      - "Bad Timing" (with Mike White, in #291, 1982)
      - "Eureka!" (with Mike White, in #325, 1983)
      - "Dad" (with Alan Langford, in #329, 1983)
      - "Buzz Off!" (with Jim Eldridge, in #331, 1983)
      - "Look Before You Leap!" (with Mike White, in #332, 1983)
    - Abelard Snazz:
      - Ro-Jaws' Robo-Tales: "The Final Solution" (with Steve Dillon, in #189–190, 1980)
      - Tharg's Future Shocks: "The Return of the Two-Storey Brain!" (with Mike White, in #209, 1981)
      - "The Double-Decker Dome Strikes Back" (with Mike White, in #237–238, 1981)
      - "Halfway to Paradise" (with John Cooper, in #245, 1982)
      - "The Multi-Storey Mind Mellows Out!" (with Paul Neary, in #254, 1982)
      - "Genius is Pain" (with Mike White, in #299, 1983)
    - Time Twisters:
      - "The Reversible Man" (with Mike White, in #308, 1983)
      - "Einstein" (with John Higgins, in #309, 1983)
      - "Chronocops" (with Dave Gibbons, in #310, 1983)
      - "The Big Clock!" (with Eric Bradbury, in #315, 1983)
      - "Going Native" (with Mike White, in #318, 1983)
      - "Ring Road" (with Jesus Redondo, in #320, 1983)
      - "The Time Machine" (with Jesus Redondo, in #324, 1983)
      - "The Startling Success of Sideways Scuttleton" (with John Higgins, in #327, 1983)
    - Assorted one-off short stories:
      - "Hot Item" (with John Higgins, in #278, 1982)
      - "Dr. Dibworthy's Disappointing Day" (with Alan Langford, in #316, 1983)
      - "The Hyper-Historic Headbang" (with Alan Davis, in #322, 1983)
      - "The Lethal Laziness of Lobelia Loam" (with Rafael Boluda, in #323, 1983)
  - "Southern Comfort" (as "R. E. Wright" — with Walter Howarth, in Sci-Fi Special '81, 1981)
  - Ro-Busters:
    - The Complete Ro-Busters (tpb, 336 pages, Rebellion, 2008, ISBN 1-905437-82-X) includes:
      - "Bax the Burner" (with Steve Dillon, in Annual '82, 1981)
      - "Old Red Eyes is Back" (with Bryan Talbot, in Annual '83, 1982)
      - "Stormeagles are Go!" (with Joe Eckers, in Annual '84, 1983)
  - Rogue Trooper:
    - Rogue Trooper: Tales of Nu-Earth Volume 1 (tpb, 400 pages, Rebellion, 2010, ISBN 1-906735-34-4) includes:
      - "Pray for War" (with Brett Ewins, in Annual '83, 1982)
      - "First of the Few" (with Jesus Redondo, in Annual '84, 1983)
  - Skizz (with Jim Baikie, in #308–330, 1983)
    - An article detailing the story development, written by Moore and titled "How He Came to be", was published in 2000 AD Annual '84 (1983)
    - Two sequel storylines, written and drawn by Baikie solo, were published in 2000 AD #767–775 (1992) and #912–927 (1994–1995)
    - The Moore-written story and the article were collected by DC Comics as Skizz (tpb, 104 pages, 2005, ISBN 1-4012-0579-8)
    - The entire Skizz strip was collected by Rebellion as The Complete Skizz (tpb, 272 pages, 2017, ISBN 1-78108-542-0)
  - The Complete D.R. and Quinch (tpb, 128 pages, Rebellion, 2006, ISBN 1-904-26548-0) collects:
    - Time Twisters: "D.R. and Quinch Have Fun on Earth!" (with Alan Davis, in #317, 1983)
    - D.R. and Quinch (with Alan Davis, in #350–359, 363–367 and Sci-Fi Special '85, 1984–1985)
  - The Ballad of Halo Jones (with Ian Gibson, in #376–385, 405–415 and 451–466, 1984–1986)
    - A joke one-page strip, written by Moore and drawn by Gibson, appeared as part of the "Tharg's Head Revisited" story in 2000 AD #500 (1986)
    - The initial run of Halo Jones strips was collected by DC Comics as The Complete Ballad of Halo Jones (tpb, 202 pages, 2005, ISBN 1-4012-0590-9)
  - ABC Warriors: "Red Planet Blues" (with Steve Dillon, in Annual '85, 1984)
    - Collected for the US market in ABC Warriors: The Meknificent Seven (tpb, 176 pages, Simon & Schuster, 2010, ISBN 1-90673-590-5)
    - Collected for the UK market in ABC Warriors: Solo Missions (tpb, 96 pages, Rebellion, 2014, ISBN 1-781-08226-X)
- Eagle (anthology; two episodes of the The Collector feature, a photostrip with elements of hand-drawn art):
  - "Trash!" (with photography by Sven Arnstein and art by Pat Wright, in #3, 1982)
  - "Profits of Doom" (with photography by Rex Archer and art by Gabor Scott, in #12, 1982)
- Scream! #1: "Monster" (with Heinzl, anthology, 1984) collected in Monster (tpb, 192 pages, Rebellion, 2016, ISBN 1-7810-8453-X)

=== DC Comics ===
Titles published by DC Comics include:

- Swamp Thing vol. 2 (with Dan Day (#20), Stephen R. Bissette, Shawn McManus (#28 and 32), Rick Veitch, Ron Randall (#33), Stan Woch (#38, 43, 45, 47, 49), John Totleben (#48, 53, 60) and Thomas Yeates (#64); issue #59 is scripted by Stephen R. Bissette from a plot by Moore, Bissette, John Totleben and Rick Veitch; issues #20–30 were published under the title The Saga of the Swamp Thing, 1984–1987) collected under DC Comics' Vertigo branding as:
  - Saga of the Swamp Thing Book One (collects #20–27, hc, 208 pages, 2009, ISBN 1-4012-2082-7; tpb, 2012, ISBN 1-4012-2083-5)
  - Saga of the Swamp Thing Book Two (collects #28–34 and Annual #2, hc, 224 pages, 2009, ISBN 1-4012-2532-2; tpb, 2012, ISBN 1-4012-2544-6)
  - Saga of the Swamp Thing Book Three (collects #35–42, hc, 208 pages, 2010, ISBN 1-4012-2766-X; tpb, 2013, ISBN 1-4012-2767-8)
  - Saga of the Swamp Thing Book Four (collects #43–50, hc, 224 pages, 2011, ISBN 1-4012-3018-0; tpb, 2013, ISBN 1-4012-4046-1)
  - Saga of the Swamp Thing Book Five (collects #51–56, hc, 168 pages, 2011, ISBN 1-4012-3095-4; tpb, 2013, ISBN 1-4012-3096-2)
  - Saga of the Swamp Thing Book Six (collects #57–61 and 63–64, hc, 208 pages, 2011, ISBN 1-4012-3298-1; tpb, 2014, ISBN 1-4012-4692-3)
- DC Universe: The Stories of Alan Moore (tpb, 304 pages, 2006, ISBN 1-4012-0927-0) collects:
  - Detective Comics #549–550: "Night Olympics" (with Klaus Janson, co-feature, 1985)
  - The Omega Men:
    - "Brief Lives" (with Kevin O'Neill, co-feature in #26, 1985)
    - "A Man's World" (with Paris Cullins, co-feature in #27, 1985)
  - The Vigilante #17–18: "Father's Day" (with Jim Baikie, 1985)
  - Green Lantern:
    - Green Lantern #188: "Mogo Doesn't Socialize" (with Dave Gibbons, co-feature, 1985)
    - Tales of the Green Lantern Corps Annual:
      - "Tygers" (with Kevin O'Neill, co-feature in #2, 1986)
      - "In Blackest Night" (with Bill Willingham, in #3, 1987)
  - Superman:
    - Superman Annual #11: "For the Man Who Has Everything" (with Dave Gibbons, 1985)
    - DC Comics Presents #85: "The Jungle Line" (with Rick Veitch, anthology, 1985)
    - Superman #423 and Action Comics #583: "Whatever Happened to the Man of Tomorrow?" (with Curt Swan, 1986)
      - All three stories were also collected as Superman: Whatever Happened to the Man of Tomorrow? (hc, 128 pages, 2009, ISBN 1-4012-2347-8; tpb, 2010, ISBN 1-8485-6397-3)
      - An oversized collection of the stories with "remastered" art was published as Superman by Alan Moore (Absolute Edition, 288 pages, 2027, ISBN 1-7995-1404-8)
  - Secret Origins vol. 2 #10: "Footsteps" (with Joe Orlando, anthology, 1987)
  - Batman:
    - Batman Annual #11: "Mortal Clay" (with George Freeman, 1987)
    - Batman: The Killing Joke (with Brian Bolland, graphic novel, 48 pages, 1988, ISBN 1-8528-6082-0)
      - A 20th Anniversary Edition of the graphic novel with new colouring by Bolland was published as Batman: The Killing Joke (hc, 64 pages, 2008, ISBN 1-4012-1667-6)
      - A 30th Anniversary Edition of the graphic novel featuring both colouring versions was published as Absolute Batman: The Killing Joke (hc, 152 pages, 2018, ISBN 1-4012-8412-4)
- Watchmen #1–12 (with Dave Gibbons, 1986–1987) collected as Watchmen (tpb, 448 pages, 1987, ISBN 0-9302-8923-4; Absolute Edition, 464 pages, 2005, ISBN 1-4012-0713-8)
  - In addition to writing the series, Moore acted as a consultant for the creators of the spin-off role-playing games, published by Mayfair Games as part of the DC Heroes series:
    - Watchmen: Who Watches the Watchmen? (DC Heroes Role-Playing Module #227, written by Dan Greenberg, 32 pages, 1987, ISBN 0-9127-7173-9)
    - Watchmen: Taking Out the Trash (DC Heroes Role-Playing Module #235, written by Ray Winninger, 32 pages, 1987, ISBN 0-9127-7184-4)
    - Watchmen Sourcebook (written by Ray Winninger, 128 pages, 1990, ISBN 0-9237-6320-1)
  - All three releases were eventually collected by DC Comics as Watchmen Companion (hc, 200 pages, 2019, ISBN 1-7795-0239-7)
- Twilight of the Superheroes (proposal for an unproduced 12-issue limited series, c. 1987–1988) published in DC Through the 80s: The End of Eras (hc, 520 pages, 2020, ISBN 1-7795-0087-4)
- V for Vendetta #1–10 (with David Lloyd, 1988–1989) collected as V for Vendetta (tpb, 288 pages, 1990, ISBN 0-9302-8952-8; Absolute Edition, 396 pages, Vertigo, 2009, ISBN 1-4012-2361-3)
  - The first seven issues feature colourised reprints of stories from the British anthology Warrior, published between 1982 and 1985.
- Albion #1–6 (scripted by Moore's daughter Leah and John Reppion from a plot by Moore, drawn by Shane Oakley, Wildstorm, 2005–2006)
  - Collected for the US market as Albion (tpb, 144 pages, 2006, ISBN 1-4012-0994-7)
  - Collected for the UK market as Albion (hc, 160 pages, Rebellion, 2026, ISBN 1-8378-6783-6)

=== Eclipse Comics ===
Titles published by Eclipse include:

- Miracleman #1–7, 9–16 (with Chuck Beckum (#6–7), Rick Veitch (#9–10) and John Totleben (#11–16), 1985–1989)
  - The first six issues feature colourised reprints of stories from the British anthology Warrior with the exception of the strip from issue #4.
  - Miracleman #8 consists of reprints of older "Marvelman" stories from the 1950s, created by Mick Anglo without the involvement of Moore.
  - In 1985, Eclipse published the Miracleman 3-D one-shot, which reprinted the contents of Marvelman Special (Quality Communications, 1984)
  - The entire series, with the exception of the Moore-written framing sequence from Marvelman Special/Miracleman 3-D, was collected as:
    - Miracleman: A Dream of Flying (collects #1–3, tpb, 80 pages, 1988, ISBN 0-913035-61-0; hc, 1990, ISBN 0-913035-62-9)
    - Miracleman: Red King Syndrome (collects #4–7 and 9–10, tpb, 128 pages, 1990, ISBN 1-56060-036-5; hc, 1991, ISBN 1-56060-035-7)
    - Miracleman: Olympus (collects #11–16, tpb, 128 pages, 1990, ISBN 1-56060-080-2; hc, 1991, ISBN 1-56060-079-9)
  - A recoloured and re-edited version of the series (with Moore credited as "The Original Writer") was published by Marvel as Miracleman vol. 2 #1–16 (2014–2015)
  - The Marvel series reprints the entire Eclipse series with the addition of the strip from Warrior #4 as well as Warpsmith stories from Warrior #9–10 (1983) and A1 #1 (1989)
  - The Marvel reprint series was subsequently collected as:
    - Miracleman: A Dream of Flying (collects vol. 2 #1–4, hc, 152 pages, 2014, ISBN 0-7851-5462-0)
    - Miracleman: The Red King Syndrome (collects vol. 2 #5–10, hc, 224 pages, 2014, ISBN 0-7851-5464-7)
    - Miracleman: Olympus (collects vol. 2 #11–16, hc, 328 pages, 2015, ISBN 0-7851-5466-3)
    - Miracleman Omnibus (collects vol. 2 #1–16, hc, 808 pages, 2022, ISBN 1-30294-729-X)
    - Miracleman: The Original Epic (collects vol. 2 #1–16, tpb, 472 pages, 2023, ISBN 1-30295-325-7)
- Doc Stearn...Mr. Monster #3: "The Riddle of the Recalcitrant Refuse" (with Michael T. Gilbert, anthology, 1985)
  - Collected in Mr. Monster: His Books of Forbidden Knowledge Volume 1 (tpb, 144 pages, Marlowe & Company, 1996, ISBN 1-5692-4802-8)
  - Collected in The Extraordinary Works of Alan Moore: Indispensable Edition (sc, 240 pages, TwoMorrows, 2008, ISBN 1-60549-009-1)
- Real War Stories #1: "Tapestries, Part One" (with Stan Woch) and "Part Two" (with Stephen R. Bissette, anthology, 1987)
- Brought to Light: "Shadowplay: The Secret Team" (with Bill Sienkiewicz, anthology graphic novel, hc, 80 pages, 1989, ISBN 0-913035-70-X; sc, 1989, ISBN 0-913035-67-X)
  - A spoken-word album adaptation, narrated by Moore with musical accompaniment by Gary Lloyd, was released via Codex Books under the title Brought to Light (1998)

=== Image Comics ===
Titles published by Image and its various imprints include:

- Spawn:
  - Spawn (Todd McFarlane Productions):
    - "In Heaven (Everything is Fine)" (with Todd McFarlane, in #8, 1993)
      - Collected in Spawn: Origins Collection Volume 2 (tpb, 184 pages, 2009, ISBN 1-60706-489-8)
      - Collected in Spawn: Origins Collection Book One (hc, 300 pages, 2010, ISBN 1-60706-153-8)
    - "The Freak" (script by Moore from a plot by Todd McFarlane, art by Greg Capullo, in #37, 1995)
      - Collected in Spawn: Origins Collection Volume 6 (tpb, 160 pages, 2010, ISBN 1-60706-225-9)
      - Collected in Spawn: Origins Collection Book Three (hc, 216 pages, 2011, ISBN 1-60706-237-2)
  - Violator #1–3 (with Bart Sears and Greg Capullo (#3), Todd McFarlane Productions, 1994) collected as Violator (tpb, 88 pages, 2025, ISBN 1-53434-759-3)
  - Violator vs. Badrock #1–4 (with Brian Denham, 1994) collected as Violator vs. Badrock: Rocks and Hard Places (tpb, 96 pages, 1998, ISBN 1-887279-11-3)
  - Spawn: Blood Feud #1–4 (with Tony Daniel, Todd McFarlane Productions, 1995)
    - A short prologue titled "Blood Feud: Preludes and Nocturnes" (art by Tony Daniel) was published in Spawn #32 (1995)
    - The prologue and the limited series were collected as Spawn: Bloodfeud (tpb, 112 pages, Titan, 1999, ISBN 1-84023-117-3)
- 1963 #1–6 (with Rick Veitch (#1, 3, 5–6), Murphy Anderson (#1) and Stephen R. Bissette (#2 and 4), 1993)
  - The final issue, tentatively titled 1963: Double Image 80-Page Giant, was planned for publication with Jim Lee as the artist.
  - Despite numerous attempts to complete the 80-Page Giant, with or without Moore's involvement, the series remains unfinished.
- ShadowHawk (Shadowline):
  - ShadowHawk Special: "Understanding Our Differences" (co-written by Moore and Jim Valentino, art by Valentino, one-page co-feature, 1994)
  - ShadowHawks of Legend: "Shadows in the Sand" (with Steve Leialoha, anthology one-shot, 1995)
- WildC.A.T.s:
  - WildC.A.T.s #21–34 (with Travis Charest (#21, 25–26, 28–31), Kevin Maguire (#22), Ryan Benjamin (#23–24, 29–30), Jason Johnson (#23–24), Kevin Nowlan (#25), Dave Johnson (#25–28), Scott Clark (#27), Aron Wiesenfeld (#28 and 31), Jim Lee (#31–32), Pat Lee (#32), Mat Broome (#32–34) and Robert Stotz (#34), Wildstorm, 1995–1996) collected as Alan Moore's Complete WildC.A.T.s (tpb, 392 pages, 2007, ISBN 1-4012-1545-9)
  - Spawn/WildC.A.T.s #1–4 (with Scott Clark, 1996) collected in Alan Moore: Wild Worlds (tpb, 320 pages, Wildstorm, 2007, ISBN 1-4012-1379-0)
  - Voodoo #1–4 (with Michael Lopez (#1–2) and Al Rio (#2–4), Wildstorm, 1997–1998)
    - Collected as Voodoo: Dancing in the Dark (tpb, 96 pages, 1999, ISBN 1-56389-533-1)
    - Collected in Alan Moore: Wild Worlds (tpb, 320 pages, 2007, ISBN 1-4012-1379-0)
  - WildC.A.T.s #50: "Reincarnation" (with Travis Charest, co-feature, Wildstorm, 1998)
    - Collected in Alan Moore: Wild Worlds (tpb, 320 pages, 2007, ISBN 1-4012-1379-0)
    - Collected in Alan Moore's Complete WildC.A.T.s (tpb, 392 pages, 2007, ISBN 1-4012-1545-9)
- Warchild (with Rob Liefeld, unproduced 4-issue limited series intended for publication under the Maximum Press imprint — initially announced in 1995)
- The Maxx #21 (dialogue over story and art by Sam Kieth, 1996) collected in The Maxx Volume 4 (tpb, 144 pages, Wildstorm, 2005, ISBN 1-4012-0613-1)
  - A new version of the story with recoloured artwork was published as The Maxx: Maxximized #21 (IDW Publishing, 2015)
  - The new version was collected by IDW in The Maxx: Maxximized Volume 5 (hc, 132 pages, 2016, ISBN 1-63140-513-6)
- Fire from Heaven #1–2 (with Ryan Benjamin (#1) and Jim Lee (#2), Wildstorm, 1996)
- Supreme #41–51, 52a, 52b, 53–56 (with Joe Bennett (#41–43), Keith Giffen (#41), Rick Veitch (#42–51, 54, 56), Dan Jurgens (#43), Richard Horie (#44), J. J. Bennett (#45 and 47), J. Morrigan (#46–47, 51, 52a, 52b), Mark Pajarillo (#48–49, 52a), Chris Sprouse (#50, 53–56), Melinda Gebbie (#54) and Gil Kane (#55); issues #41–42 were published under Image's Extreme Studios imprint; issues #43–48 were published by Maximum Press under the title Supreme: The New Adventures; issues #49–51, 52a, 52b, 53–56 were published by Awesome Entertainment, 1996–1998)
  - The series was relaunched by Awesome Entertainment under the title Supreme: The Return (see below).
  - Moore's storyline was partially collected by Checker Book Publishing as:
    - Supreme: The Story of the Year (collects #41–51, 52a and 52b, tpb, 332 pages, 2003, ISBN 0-9710249-5-2)
      - Oversized issues #52a and 52b contained a number of co-features that were not included in this volume:
        - "Squeak the Supremouse: What a Friend We Have in Cheeses!" (with Kevin O'Neill, in #52a)
        - "Secrets of the Citadel Supreme!" (with Rick Veitch, in #52a)
        - "Suprema: The Has-Been Supreme!" (with Jim Mooney, in #52a)
        - "Public Service Announcement: National Flashlight Battery Inspection Day!" (with Rick Veitch, in #52b)
        - "The Secret Origin of the Professor Night/Supreme Team!" (with Rick Veitch, in #52b)
        - "Supreme and the Funny Book Felonies!" (with Rick Veitch, in #52b)
    - Supreme: The Return (collects #53–56 and Supreme: The Return #1–6, tpb, 258 pages, 2003, ISBN 0-9710249-6-0)
      - Issue #54 featured an 8-page sequence printed twice, with art by Melinda Gebbie (as part of the story) and J. Morrigan (as a "special bonus feature").
      - This volume includes only the Morrigan's version of the sequence, arranged as part of the story in place of the Gebbie's version.
- Wildstorm Spotlight #1: "The Big Chill" (with Carlos D'Anda, anthology, Wildstorm, 1997)
  - Collected in Mr. Majestic (tpb, 176 pages, 2002, ISBN 1-56389-659-1)
  - Collected in Alan Moore: Wild Worlds (tpb, 320 pages, 2007, ISBN 1-4012-1379-0)
- Deathblow: Byblows #1–3 (with Jim Baikie, Wildstorm, 1999–2000) collected in Alan Moore: Wild Worlds (tpb, 320 pages, 2007, ISBN 1-4012-1379-0)
- Mr. Monster's Gal Friday... Kelly #3: "It's Kelly's Boyfriend... Mr. Monster – Shopping" (with Alan Smith, anthology, 2000)
- 24 Panels: "If Einstein's Right..." (poem illustrated by Melinda Gebbie, anthology graphic novel, 112 pages, 2018, ISBN 1-5343-1126-2)

==== Awesome Entertainment ====
Titles published by Awesome Entertainment, a company established by Rob Liefeld after his departure from Image, include:

- Judgment Day:
  - Judgment Day Sourcebook (with Chris Sprouse, untitled 6-page prologue in the mail order-only one-shot, 1997)
  - Judgment Day (tpb, 162 pages, Checker Book Publishing, 2003, ISBN 0-9741664-5-6) collects:
    - Judgment Day Alpha (with Rob Liefeld, Gil Kane, Stephen Platt, Keith Giffen, Adam Pollina and Dan Jurgens, one-shot, 1997)
    - Judgment Day Omega (with Rob Liefeld, Chris Sprouse, Steve Skroce, Stephen Platt, Jim Starlin and Terry Dodson, one-shot, 1997)
    - Judgment Day: Final Judgment (with Rob Liefeld, Marat Mychaels, Cedric Nocon, Jeff Johnson, Rick Veitch and Ian Churchill, one-shot, 1997)
    - Awesome Holiday Special: "Youngblood Prologue (featuring Shaft)" (with Steve Skroce, anthology, 1997)
    - Judgment Day: Aftermath (with Gil Kane, one-shot, 1998)
- Youngblood:
  - Youngblood: Special Exclusive Edition #1+: "A Brief History of Twilight" (with Steve Skroce, co-feature in mail order-only one-shot, 1997)
    - This one-shot also included a reprint of the "Youngblood Prologue (featuring Shaft)" short story from Awesome Holiday Special (1997)
  - Youngblood vol. 3 #1–2 (with Steve Skroce, 1998)
    - Moore's outline for a 12-issue run on the series was published in Alan Moore's Awesome Universe Handbook (one-shot, 1999)
    - A truncated version of the script for issue #3 was repurposed into a new series (which was eventually cancelled after one issue):
      - Awesome Adventures #1: "Dandy in the Underworld" (with Steve Skroce, Marat Mychaels and Dietrich Smith, 1999)
    - Moore's scripts for issues #2–7 of the Youngblood series are available online.
- Glory vol. 2 #0: "Glory and the Gate of Tears" (with Brandon Peterson, 8-page prologue, 1999)
  - A black-and-white "preview" version of this story was published in Awesome Preview (anthology one-shot, 1998)
  - After Awesome Entertainment's bankruptcy, Liefeld sold the publishing license and Moore's completed scripts for the series to Avatar.
- Supreme: The Return #1–6 (with Chris Sprouse (#1), Jim Starlin (#2), Jim Baikie (#3), Matthew Dow Smith (#3–4), Rick Veitch (#3–6), Ian Churchill (#5) and Rob Liefeld (#6), 1999–2000)
  - These six issues were collected by Checker Book Publishing alongside the preceding issues of the Supreme series in Supreme: The Return (tpb, 258 pages, 2003, ISBN 0-9710249-6-0)
  - Moore's script for issue #7 (intended to be the penultimate issue of his entire run on Supreme) was not produced by Awesome Entertainment due to the company's bankruptcy.
  - The issue was eventually published via Image's revived Extreme Studios imprint as a launching pad for a new Supreme storyline, written and drawn by Erik Larsen:
    - Supreme #63: "Revelations" (art by Erik Larsen, 2012)

==== America's Best Comics ====
Titles published by America's Best Comics, an imprint of Wildstorm (itself an imprint of Image and later DC Comics) established and overseen by Moore, include:

- Tom Strong:
  - America's Best Comics Preview (with Chris Sprouse, untitled 8-page story in the promotional one-shot, 1999)
    - The one-shot was published by Wizard Entertainment and distributed as a free supplement to Wizard #91.
    - The story was first reprinted in America's Best Comics 64-Page Giant (anthology one-shot, 2001)
    - The 64-Page Giant was subsequently collected in America's Best Comics (tpb, 192 pages, 2004, ISBN 1-4012-0147-4)
    - The story was also collected in Tom Strong Compendium Book Two (tpb, 752 pages, DC Comics, 2026, ISBN 1-7995-0746-7)
  - Tom Strong #1–22, 36 (with Chris Sprouse, Art Adams (co-feature in #4), Jerry Ordway (co-feature in #5 and full-length issues #20–22), Dave Gibbons (co-feature in #6), Gary Frank (co-feature in #7), Alan Weiss (co-feature in #8), Paul Chadwick (co-feature in #9), Gary Gianni (co-feature in #10), Russ Heath + Kyle Baker + Pete Poplaski (#13), Hilary Barta (co-feature in #14) and Howard Chaykin (co-feature in #19), 1999–2003; 2006)
    - Issue #19 included a co-feature written by Moore's daughter Leah and drawn by Shawn McManus; issues #23–35 were created by various up-and-coming and veteran writers and artists:
      - Issues #23–24 and 35 were written by Peter Hogan and drawn by Chris Sprouse.
      - Issue #25 was written by Geoff Johns and drawn by John Paul Leon.
      - Issue #26 was written by Mark Schultz and drawn by Pasqual Ferry.
      - Issue #27 was written by Steve Aylett and drawn by Shawn McManus.
      - Issue #28 was written by Brian K. Vaughan and drawn by Peter Snejbjerg.
      - Issues #29–30 were written by Ed Brubaker and drawn by Duncan Fegredo.
      - Issues #31–32 were written by Michael Moorcock and drawn by Jerry Ordway.
      - Issue #33 was written by Joe Casey and drawn by Ben Oliver.
      - Issue #34 was written by Steve Moore and drawn by Paul Gulacy.
    - The series has been collected in numerous formats as:
      - Tom Strong Book One (collects #1–7, hc, 208 pages, 2000, ISBN 1-56389-654-0; tpb, 2001, ISBN 1-56389-664-8)
      - Tom Strong Book Two (collects #8–14, hc, 192 pages, 2002, ISBN 1-56389-874-8; tpb, 2003, ISBN 1-56389-880-2)
      - Tom Strong Book Three (collects #15–19, hc, 144 pages, 2004, ISBN 1-4012-0282-9; tpb, 2005, ISBN 1-4012-0285-3)
      - Tom Strong Book Four (collects #20–25, hc, 160 pages, 2005, ISBN 1-4012-0571-2; tpb, 2005, ISBN 1-4012-0572-0)
      - Tom Strong Book Five (collects #26–30, hc, 136 pages, 2005, ISBN 1-4012-0624-7; tpb, 2006, ISBN 1-4012-0625-5)
      - Tom Strong Book Six (collects #31–36, hc, 160 pages, 2006, ISBN 1-4012-1108-9; tpb, 2008, ISBN 1-4012-1109-7)
      - Tom Strong: The Deluxe Edition Volume 1 (collects #1–12, hc, 336 pages, 2009, ISBN 1-4012-2536-5)
      - Tom Strong: The Deluxe Edition Volume 2 (collects #13–24, hc, 336 pages, 2010, ISBN 1-4012-2680-9)
      - Tom Strong Compendium Book One (collects #1–36, tpb, 952 pages, DC Comics, 2023, ISBN 1-7795-2172-3)
  - Tom Strong Compendium Book Two (tpb, 752 pages, DC Comics, 2026, ISBN 1-7995-0746-7) includes:
    - America's Best Comics 64-Page Giant: "Skull and Bones" (written by Steve Moore, drawn by Humberto Ramos, anthology one-shot, 2001)
    - Tom Strong's Terrific Tales #1–12 (anthology, 2002–2005)
      - The series included one regular co-feature by Moore as well as occasional one-off stories:
        - "Tom Strong" (with Paul Rivoche (#1–2 and 4), Jerry Ordway (#3 and 6), Jason Pearson (#5 and 8), Shawn McManus (#7), Michael Kaluta (#9) and Peter Kuper (#10), in #1–10)
        - "Tom Strong's Daughter, Tesla Strong" (with Jaime Hernandez (#1) and Bruce Timm (#11), in #1 and 11)
        - "King Solomon" (written by Moore's daughter Leah, drawn by Sergio Aragonés, in #5)
        - "The Strongs" (with Peter Bagge, in #12)
      - The series also included two regular co-features written by Steve Moore:
        - "Jonni Future" (drawn by Art Adams and Chris Weston (#11–12), in #1–4 and 6–12)
        - "Young Tom Strong" (drawn by Alan Weiss, in #1–12)
      - All of the co-features were first collected in two volumes:
        - Tom Strong's Terrific Tales Book One (collects #1–6, hc, 176 pages, 2005, ISBN 1-4012-0030-3; tpb, 2005, ISBN 1-4012-0029-X)
        - Tom Strong's Terrific Tales Book Two (collects #7–12, hc, 160 pages, 2005, ISBN 1-4012-0615-8; tpb, 2011, ISBN 1-4012-3265-5)
    - The Many Worlds of Tesla Strong (scripted by Peter Hogan from a plot by Moore and Hogan, drawn by various artists, one-shot, 2003)
  - Terra Obscura (scripted by Peter Hogan from a plot by Moore and Hogan, drawn by Yanick Paquette):
    - Terra Obscura: S.M.A.S.H. of Two Worlds (tpb, 336 pages, Vertigo, 2014, ISBN 1-4012-4280-4) collects:
      - Terra Obscura #1–6 (2003–2004) also collected as Terra Obscura (tpb, 160 pages, 2004, ISBN 1-4012-0286-1)
      - Terra Obscura vol. 2 #1–6 (2004–2005) also collected as Terra Obscura Volume 2 (tpb, 144 pages, 2005, ISBN 1-4012-0622-0)
- The League of Extraordinary Gentlemen (with Kevin O'Neill):
  - The League of Extraordinary Gentlemen Omnibus (hc, 416 pages, Vertigo, 2011, ISBN 1-4012-3321-X; tpb, 2013, ISBN 1-4012-4083-6) collects:
    - The League of Extraordinary Gentlemen, Volume I #1–6 (1999–2000)
      - Also collected as The League of Extraordinary Gentlemen, Volume I (hc, 176 pages, 2000, ISBN 1-56389-665-6; tpb, 2002, ISBN 1-56389-858-6)
      - Also collected (alongside Moore's scripts for the entire series) as Absolute League of Extraordinary Gentlemen, Volume I (hc, 416 pages, 2003, ISBN 1-4012-0052-4)
    - The League of Extraordinary Gentlemen, Volume II #1–6 (2002–2003)
      - Also collected as The League of Extraordinary Gentlemen, Volume II (hc, 224 pages, 2003, ISBN 1-4012-0117-2; tpb, 2004, ISBN 1-4012-0118-0)
      - Also collected (alongside Moore's scripts for the entire series) as Absolute League of Extraordinary Gentlemen, Volume II (hc, 448 pages, 2005, ISBN 1-4012-0611-5)
  - The League of Extraordinary Gentlemen: Black Dossier (graphic novel collection of various miscellanea, hc, 208 pages, 2007, ISBN 1-4012-0306-X; sc, 2008, ISBN 0-8616-6177-X)
    - Moore and musician Tim Perkins recorded two songs as members of a fictional band, "Eddie Enrico and His Hawaiian Hotshots", to be released as a 7-inch single alongside this graphic novel.
    - The single was omitted from the original US release of the book and its reprint, Absolute League of Extraordinary Gentlemen: Black Dossier (hc, 208 pages, 2008, ISBN 1-4012-0751-0)
    - The single was eventually released in 2012 by Knockabout as an addition to the official first UK printing of The League of Extraordinary Gentlemen: Black Dossier (ISBN 0-8616-6176-1)
    - Black Dossier was collected alongside the first two volumes in The League of Extraordinary Gentlemen Omnibus: Jubilee Edition (hc, 608 pages, Vertigo, 2019, ISBN 1-4012-8900-2)
  - After numerous clashes with Wildstorm's parent companies DC Comics and Warner Bros., including the Black Dossier single debacle, Moore and O'Neill moved the series to Top Shelf.
- Promethea (with J. H. Williams III, Charles Vess (#4) and José Villarrubia (#7), 1999–2005) collected as:
  - Book One (collects #1–6, hc, 160 pages, 2000, ISBN 1-56389-655-9; tpb, 2001, ISBN 1-56389-667-2)
  - Book Two (collects #7–12, hc, 176 pages, 2001, ISBN 1-56389-784-9; tpb, 2003, ISBN 1-56389-957-4)
  - Book Three (collects #13–18, hc, 176 pages, 2002, ISBN 1-56389-900-0; tpb, 2003, ISBN 1-4012-0094-X)
  - Book Four (collects #19–25, hc, 192 pages, 2003, ISBN 1-4012-0032-X; tpb, 2005, ISBN 1-4012-0031-1)
  - Book Five (collects #26–32, hc, 200 pages, 2005, ISBN 1-4012-0619-0; tpb, 2006, ISBN 1-4012-0620-4)
  - Absolute Edition Volume 1 (collects #1–12, hc, 328 pages, 2009, ISBN 1-4012-2372-9)
  - Absolute Edition Volume 2 (collects #13–24, hc, 328 pages, 2010, ISBN 1-4012-2842-9)
  - Absolute Edition Volume 3 (collects #25–32 and Tom Strong #36, hc, 328 pages, 2011, ISBN 1-4012-2947-6)
    - This volume also includes two installments of the spin-off strip "Little Margie in Misty Magic Land" (written by Steve Moore, drawn by Eric Shanower)
    - These short stories initially appeared in anthology titles America's Best Comics 64-Page Giant (one-shot, 2001) and Tomorrow Stories Special #2 (2006)
- Top 10:
  - Absolute Top 10 (hc, 576 pages, DC Comics, 2013, ISBN 1-4012-3825-4) collects:
    - Top 10 (with Gene Ha, 1999–2001) also collected as:
      - Book One (collects #1–7, hc, 208 pages, 2000, ISBN 1-56389-657-5; tpb, 2001, ISBN 1-56389-668-0)
      - Book Two (collects #8–12, hc, 144 pages, 2002, ISBN 1-56389-876-4; tpb, 2003, ISBN 1-56389-966-3)
      - The Deluxe Edition (collects #1–12, tpb, 352 pages, Vertigo, 2015, ISBN 1-4012-5493-4)
    - America's Best Comics 64-Page Giant: "DeadFellas" (with Zander Cannon, anthology one-shot, 2001) also collected in America's Best Comics (tpb, 192 pages, 2004, ISBN 1-4012-0147-4)
    - Smax #1–5 (with Zander Cannon, 2003–2004) also collected as Smax (hc, 128 pages, 2004, ISBN 1-4012-0325-6; tpb, 2005, ISBN 1-4012-0290-X)
    - Top 10: The Forty-Niners (with Gene Ha, graphic novel, hc, 112 pages, 2005, ISBN 1-56389-757-1; sc, 2006, ISBN 1-4012-0573-9)
  - Top 10: Beyond the Farthest Precinct #1–5 (written by Paul Di Filippo, drawn by Jerry Ordway, 2005–2006)
  - Top 10: Season Two #1–4 (co-written by Zander and Kevin Cannon, drawn by Gene Ha, 2008–2009)
  - Top 10: Season Two Special (co-written by Zander and Kevin Cannon, drawn by Daxiong, 2009)
- Tomorrow Stories #1–12 (anthology, 1999–2002)
  - The series consisted of five co-features, all written by Moore:
    - "Jack B. Quick" (with Kevin Nowlan, in #1–4, 10, 12)
    - "Greyshirt" (with Rick Veitch, in #1–12)
    - "The First American" (with Jim Baikie, in #1–12)
    - "The Cobweb" (with Melinda Gebbie, Dame Darcy (#9–10), Joyce Chin (#11) and Rick Veitch (#12), in #1–12)
      - The installment initially intended for publication in Tomorrow Stories #8 was rejected by DC Comics due to its potentially controversial contents.
      - In 2003, the story was published in the Top Shelf Asks the Big Questions anthology graphic novel, with the title character renamed to "La Toile".
    - "Splash Brannigan" (with Hilary Barta, in #6–9 and 11)
  - All of the co-features were collected in two volumes:
    - Tomorrow Stories Book One (collects #1–6, hc, 176 pages, 2002, ISBN 1-56389-660-5; tpb, 2003, ISBN 1-56389-985-X)
    - Tomorrow Stories Book Two (collects #7–12, hc, 160 pages, 2004, ISBN 1-4012-0165-2; tpb, 2005, ISBN 1-4012-0166-0)
  - America's Best Comics 64-Page Giant (anthology one-shot, 2001) included several features starring characters from Tomorrow Stories:
    - "Jack B. Quick's Amazing World of Science" (with Kevin Nowlan, two 1-page strips)
    - "The FIRST First American!" (with Sergio Aragonés)
    - "Splash Brannigan: Specters from Projectors!?!" (with Kyle Baker)
    - "The Cobweb: He Tied Me to a Buzz-Saw (And It Felt Like a Kiss)" (with Dame Darcy)
  - All of the stories from the 64-Page Giant were later collected in America's Best Comics (tpb, 192 pages, 2004, ISBN 1-4012-0147-4)
  - The character Greyshirt starred in his own spin-off series, Greyshirt: Indigo Sunset #1–6 (written and drawn by Rick Veitch, 2001–2002)
  - Tomorrow Stories was revived as a 2-issue limited series Tomorrow Stories Special (2005–2006) featuring:
    - "Jack B. Quick: I, Robert" (with Kevin Nowlan, in #1)
    - "Splash Brannigan: The Big Seep" (with Hilary Barta, in #1)
    - "The Cobweb: Doom Date of the Dusk Duo!" (with Melinda Gebbie, in #1)
    - "Johnny/Jonni Future" (written by Steve Moore, drawn by Cameron Stewart (#1) and Joyce Chin (#2), in #1–2)
    - "A Greyshirt Primer" (with Rick Veitch, in #1)
    - "America's Best: The Lethal Luck of the Magister Ludi!!" (with Rick Veitch, in #2)
    - "How Come Nobody Likes the First American These Days?" (with Jim Baikie, in #2)
    - "Promethea: Little Margie in Misty Magic Land" (written by Steve Moore, drawn by Eric Shanower, in #2)
- The ABC Sketchbook (collection of sketches and promotional art by various artists with commentary, one-shot, 2002)

=== Avatar Press ===
Titles published by Avatar include:

- Alan Moore's Glory #1–2 (with Marat Mychaels, Melinda Gebbie (#1) and Matt Martin (#2), 2001–2002)
  - The series, originally written by Moore for Awesome Entertainment, was announced to run for 4 issues, but only half of it ended up being released.
  - Prior to the series' launch, Avatar published issue #0 of Alan Moore's Glory, which is a reprint of Awesome Entertainment's Glory vol. 2 #0 (see above).
- Alan Moore's Neonomicon #1–4 (with Jacen Burrows, 2010–2011)
  - This series is a sequel to Moore's prose story "The Courtyard" that was adapted into comics as a 2-issue limited series Alan Moore's The Courtyard (2003)
  - Collected (alongside The Courtyard comic adaptation) as Alan Moore's Neonomicon (hc, 176 pages, 2011, ISBN 1-59291-131-5; tpb, 2011, ISBN 1-59291-130-7)
- God is Dead: Book of Acts Alpha: "Grandeur and Monstrosity" (with Facundo Percio, anthology one-shot, 2014)
- Crossed: +100 #1–6 (with Gabriel Andrade, 2014–2015) collected as Crossed: +100 Volume 1 (hc, 160 pages, 2015, ISBN 1-5929-1265-6; tpb, 2015, ISBN 1-59291-264-8)
  - The series continued publication until issue #18, written by Simon Spurrier from Moore's extensive notes and outline, drawn by various artists and collected as:
    - Crossed: +100 Volume 2 (collects #7–12, tpb, 160 pages, 2016, ISBN 1-5929-1275-3)
    - Crossed: +100 Volume 3 (collects #13–18, tpb, 144 pages, 2017, ISBN 1-5929-1287-7)
- Providence (with Jacen Burrows, 2015–2017) collected as:
  - Act One (collects #1–4, hc, 160 pages, 2016, ISBN 1-59291-281-8)
  - Act Two (collects #5–8, hc, 176 pages, 2017, ISBN 1-59291-292-3)
  - Act Three (collects #9–12, hc, 144 pages, 2017, ISBN 1-59291-293-1)
  - Compendium (collects #1–12, tpb, 480 pages, 2021, ISBN 1-59291-339-3)
- Alan Moore's Cinema Purgatorio #1–18 (anthology curated by Moore and Kevin O'Neill, 2016–2019)
  - The series consisted of five co-features, with the first one written by Moore and acting as a framing sequence:
    - "Cinema Purgatorio" (with Kevin O'Neill) collected as Cinema Purgatorio (tpb, 168 pages, 2021, ISBN 1-5929-1334-2)
    - "Code Pru" (written by Garth Ennis, drawn by Raulo Cáceres)
    - "Modded" (written by Kieron Gillen, drawn by Ignacio Calero (#1–6) and Nahuel Lopez)
    - "A More Perfect Union" (written by Max Brooks, drawn by Michael DiPascale (#1–7) and Gabriel Andrade)
    - "The Vast" (written by Christos Gage, drawn by Gabriel Andrade)

==== Adaptations ====
In addition to publishing Moore-written comics, Avatar produced several adaptations of his short prose stories and poems, which include:

- Alan Moore's Magic Words (five adaptations of Moore's song lyrics, hc, 56 pages, 2002, ISBN 1-5929-1002-5; sc, 2002, ISBN 0-9706-7849-5)
  - All adaptations were written by Art Brooks and first published in Spain as Magical Mystery Moore (48 pages, Sulaco Ediciones, 2000, ISBN 8-49561-920-2)
  - Each of the five songs presented in this volume was previously adapted by different artists in the pages of Caliber's anthology series Negative Burn (see below):
    - "Hair of the Snake That Bit Me" (art by Sergio Bleda)
    - "Leopardman at C&A" (art by Martín Cáceres)
    - "Fires I Wish I'd Seen" (art by Vicente Cifuentes)
    - "14.2.99" (art by Juan José Ryp)
    - "The Town of Lights" (art by Alfredo Torres)
  - In addition to these entries, the book also includes Moore's palindromic poem "Symmetry Becomes It" with illustrations by Jacen Burrows.
  - This poem was originally created as part of Moore's spoken-word album The Moon and Serpent Grand Egyptian Theatre of Marvels (1996)
- Alan Moore's The Courtyard #1–2 (written by Antony Johnston, drawn by Jacen Burrows, 2003)
  - Adapted from Moore's short story of the same name; in 2010, Avatar published the Moore-written sequel to this series, Neonomicon.
  - Collected as Alan Moore's The Courtyard (tpb, 56 pages, 2004, ISBN 1-59291-015-7; hc, 128 pages, 2004, ISBN 1-59291-017-3)
  - The original short story was reprinted in Alan Moore's The Courtyard Companion (tpb, 72 pages, 2004, ISBN 1-59291-016-5)
  - A colourised version of the series was published as Alan Moore's The Courtyard: Color Edition (tpb, 56 pages, 2009, ISBN 1-59291-060-2)
  - The colourised version was also included in Alan Moore's Neonomicon (hc, 176 pages, 2011, ISBN 1-59291-131-5; tpb, 2011, ISBN 1-59291-130-7)
- Alan Moore's Another Suburban Romance (three adaptations of Moore's song lyrics, hc, 64 pages, 2003, ISBN 1-5929-1008-4; sc, 2003, ISBN 1-5929-1007-6)
  - All adaptations ("Judy Switched Off the TV", "Old Gangsters Never Die", "Another Suburban Romance") were written by Antony Johnston and drawn by Juan José Ryp.
  - A recording of "Old Gangsters Never Die" was released on a 7-inch vinyl single; an adaptation of the song by a different artist was printed in the single's inner sleeve.
  - An adaptation of "Another Suburban Romance" by a different artist was previously published in the pages of Caliber's anthology series Negative Burn.
- Alan Moore's Yuggoth Cultures and Other Growths #1–3 (collection of reprints, adaptations and interviews with Moore, 2003)
  - The series includes the first and only installment of Nightjar, written by Moore and drawn by Bryan Talbot in the early 1980s.
  - The strip, created for the British anthology Warrior, was not published due to Moore's fallout with Quality Communications.
  - In addition to Nightjar, the series also includes two adaptations of Moore's prose short stories, both written by Antony Johnston:
    - "Zaman's Hill" (drawn by Juan José Ryp, in #1)
    - "Recognition" (drawn by Jacen Burrows, in #2)
  - Johnston also adapted two more of Moore's songs (previously adapted by other creators in the pages of Caliber's anthology series Negative Burn):
    - "Litvinoff's Book" (drawn by Mike Wolfer, in #2)
    - "Me and Dorothy Parker" (drawn by Marat Mychaels, in #3)
  - The entire series was collected as Alan Moore's Yuggoth Cultures and Other Growths (hc, 312 pages, 2007, ISBN 1-59291-027-0; tpb, 2007, ISBN 1-59291-026-2)
- Alan Moore's Hypothetical Lizard #1–4 (written by Antony Johnston, drawn by Lorenzo Lorente (#1) and Sebastián Fiumara (#2–4), 2005–2006)
  - Adapted from Moore's short story "A Hypothetical Lizard" (sometimes reprinted under the title "The Hypothetical Lizard").
  - Collected, alongside the original short story, as Alan Moore's Hypothetical Lizard (hc, 128 pages, 2007, ISBN 1-5929-1039-4; tpb, 2007, ISBN 1-5929-1038-6)
- Light of Thy Countenance (written by Antony Johnston, drawn by Felipe Massafera, graphic novel, 48 pages, 2009, ISBN 1-59291-063-7; sc, 2009, ISBN 1-59291-062-9)
  - Adapted from Moore's short story of the same name.
- Fashion Beast #1–10 (written by Antony Johnston, drawn by Facundo Percio, 2012–2013)
  - Adapted from an unproduced screenplay written by Moore (based on a story by Malcolm McLaren).
  - Collected as Fashion Beast (hc, 256 pages, 2013, ISBN 1-5929-1212-5; tpb, 2013, ISBN 1-5929-1211-7)

=== Top Shelf Productions ===
Titles published by Top Shelf include:

- Top Shelf Asks the Big Questions: "Brighter Than You Think..." (with Melinda Gebbie, anthology graphic novel, 336 pages, 2003, ISBN 1-8918-3032-5)
- Lost Girls (with Melinda Gebbie, graphic novel — three-volume edition, 264 pages, 2006, ISBN 1-891830-74-0; single-volume edition, 320 pages, 2009, ISBN 1-60309-044-4)
- The League of Extraordinary Gentlemen (with Kevin O'Neill; preceding volumes published under the America's Best Comics imprint established under Image and later DC Comics):
  - The League of Extraordinary Gentlemen: Century (hc, 256 pages, 2014, ISBN 1-6030-9329-X; tpb, 2018, ISBN 1-6030-9437-7) collects:
    - The League of Extraordinary Gentlemen: Century — 1910 (graphic novel, 80 pages, 2009, ISBN 1-60309-000-2)
    - The League of Extraordinary Gentlemen: Century — 1969 (graphic novel, 80 pages, 2011, ISBN 1-60309-006-1)
    - The League of Extraordinary Gentlemen: Century — 2009 (graphic novel, 80 pages, 2012, ISBN 1-60309-007-X)
  - The League of Extraordinary Gentlemen: Nemo Trilogy (slipcased edition of three separately released volumes, 2016, ISBN 1-6030-9381-8) collects:
    - Nemo: Heart of Ice (graphic novel, 56 pages, 2013, ISBN 1-60309-274-9)
    - Nemo: Roses of Berlin (graphic novel, 56 pages, 2014, ISBN 1-60309-320-6)
    - Nemo: River of Ghosts (graphic novel, 56 pages, 2015, ISBN 1-60309-355-9)
  - The League of Extraordinary Gentlemen: The Tempest #1–6 (2018–2019)
    - In 2015, Top Shelf became an imprint of IDW Publishing, and all issues and collections of this volume were released under the company's branding.
    - Collected as The League of Extraordinary Gentlemen: The Tempest (hc, 224 pages, 2020, ISBN 1-60309-456-3; tpb, 2021, ISBN 1-6030-9496-2)
- The Bojeffries Saga: "After They Were Famous" and "Mental Rentals" (with Steve Parkhouse, new stories created for the collection, tpb, 104 pages, 2014, ISBN 1-603090-63-0)
- From Hell: Master Edition #1–10 (reprints of the series colourised by Eddie Campbell, 2018–2020) collected as From Hell: Master Edition (hc, 576 pages, 2020, ISBN 1-6030-9469-5)

=== Other US publishers ===
Titles published by various American publishers include:

- First Comics:
  - American Flagg! #21–27 (with Larry Stroman (#21–23) and Don Lomax, 1985)
    - Moore's storyline ran through 8-page co-features in issues #21–26 and concluded in the full-length issue #27.
    - Collected in Howard Chaykin's American Flagg! Omnibus (hc, 1,064 pages, Image, 2027, ISBN 1-5343-3358-4)
  - Lux Brevis (with John Totleben, unreleased strip intended for publication in an untitled horror anthology edited by Tim Truman)
    - The strip was reportedly supposed to run for six 8-page episodes; only one episode was produced before work on the anthology was abandoned.
    - The only existing episode was first published in Kimota! The Miracleman Companion (sc, 148 pages, TwoMorrows, 2001, ISBN 1-893905-11-X)
- Marvel:
  - Heroes for Hope: Starring the X-Men (with Richard Corben, three-page (16–18) sequence featuring Magneto in the special jam benefit comic, one-shot, 1985)
  - Epic Illustrated #34: "Love Doesn't Last Forever" (with Rick Veitch, anthology, Epic, 1986) collected in Shiny Beasts (tpb, 88 pages, King Hell, 2007, ISBN 0-9624864-9-3)
  - Heroes: "Now We are All in Guernica" (short prose piece with an illustration by Dave Gibbons, anthology one-shot, 2001)
- Fantagraphics:
  - Dalgoda #8: "Batfishing in Suburbia" (with Steve Parkhouse, anthology, 1986)
    - Colourised and collected by Tundra UK in The Complete Bojeffries Saga (tpb, 80 pages, 1992, ISBN 1-879450-65-8)
    - The original, black-and-white version was collected by Top Shelf in The Bojeffries Saga (tpb, 104 pages, 2014, ISBN 1-603090-63-0)
  - Anything Goes! #2: "In Pictopia!" (with Don Simpson, anthology, 1986)
    - A recoloured version of the story was printed in The Extraordinary Works of Alan Moore (sc, 224 pages, TwoMorrows, 2003, ISBN 1-893905-24-1)
    - An oversized edition with "remastered" art (and Moore's writing credit withdrawn) was published as In Pictopia (tpb, 28 pages, 2021, ISBN 1-6839-6457-8)
  - Hate #30: "The Hasty Smear of My Smile..." (with Peter Bagge, co-feature, 1998) collected in Peter Bagge's Other Stuff (tpb, 136 pages, 2013, ISBN 1-606-99622-3)
  - Meat Cake vol. 2 #9: "Hungry is the Heart" (with Dame Darcy, co-feature, 1999)
    - Collected in Dame Darcy's Meat Cake (hc, 200 pages, 2003, ISBN 1-5609-7532-6; tpb, 240 pages, 2010, ISBN 1-6069-9346-1)
    - Collected in The Meat Cake Bible (hc, 476 pages, 2016, ISBN 1-6069-9910-9)
- Dark Horse:
  - Godzilla, King of the Monsters Special (as artist, one-page pin-up illustration, among other artists, 1987)
  - Basil Wolverton's Planet of Terror! (as artist, cover illustration for the one-shot of reprints of Wolverton's comics, 1987)
  - Doc Stearn...Mr. Monster vol. 2 #5 (as artist, one-page pin-up illustration, 1989) reprinted in Mr. Monster: Origins (tpb, 216 pages, Graphitti Designs, 1996, ISBN 0-9362-1153-9)
  - 9-11 Volume 1: "This is Information" (with Melinda Gebbie, anthology graphic novel, 196 pages, 2002, ISBN 1-56389-881-0)
- Taboo (anthology, Spiderbaby Graphix):
  - "Come on Down" (with Bill Wray, in #1, 1988)
  - From Hell (with Eddie Campbell, in #2–7, 1989–1992)
    - All chapters were reprinted in From Hell #1–2 (Tundra, 1991–1993) and From Hell #3 (Kitchen Sink, 1993)
    - The series continued publication with new material under Kitchen Sink until its eventual completion:
      - From Hell #4–10 (1994–1996)
      - From Hell: Dance of the Gull-Catchers (one-shot, 1998)
    - Supplemental material published alongside the series includes:
      - From Hell: The Compleat Scripts (collection of scripts for the early chapters, sc, 344 pages, Borderlands Press, 1994, ISBN 1-8803-2507-1)
      - Letters of correspondence between Moore and Dave Sim regarding the series, published in four parts in Cerebus #217–220 (Aardvark-Vanaheim, 1997)
    - The entire series was collected as From Hell (tpb, 572 pages, Eddie Campbell Comics, 1999, ISBN 0-9585783-4-6; hc, Top Shelf, 2006, ISBN 1-6030-9397-4)
  - Lost Girls (with Melinda Gebbie, in #5–7, 1991–1992)
    - All chapters were reprinted in Lost Girls #1–2 (Kitchen Sink, 1995–1996)
    - The Kitchen Sink series stopped publication after two issues; a decade later, the story was published in its entirety as a three-volume graphic novel via Top Shelf.
- The Puma Blues #20: "Act of Faith..." (with Stephen R. Bissette, co-feature, Aardvark-Vanaheim, 1988) collected in The Puma Blues (hc, 576 pages, Dover, 2015, ISBN 0-4867-9813-5)
- American Splendor #15: "Bob Wachsman, Tummler" (as artist, written and published by Harvey Pekar, anthology, 1990)
- Raw vol. 2 #3: "The Bowing Machine" (with Mark Beyer, anthology, Penguin Books, 1991)
- Kitchen Sink:
  - Images of Omaha #2: "Dr. Omaha Presents... Venus in Fur: Candid Chit-Chats with Cartoon Kit-Cats" (with Melinda Gebbie, anthology, 1992)
  - The Spirit: The New Adventures #1 (with Dave Gibbons) and #3: "Last Night I Dreamed of Doctor Cobra" (with Daniel Torres, anthology, 1998)
    - Collected in Will Eisner's The Spirit Archives Volume 27 (hc, 232 pages, Dark Horse, 2009, ISBN 1-56971-732-X)
    - Collected in Will Eisner's The Spirit: The New Adventures (hc, 136 pages, Dark Horse, 2016, ISBN 1-61655-948-9)
- Negative Burn (adaptations of Moore's song lyrics, anthology, Caliber):
  - "Another Suburban Romance" (art by Ken Meyer, Jr., in #9, 1994)
  - Alan Moore's Songbook (tpb, 64 pages, 1998, ISBN 0-941613-65-8) collects:
    - "London" (art by Richard Case, in #10, 1994)
    - "Positively Bridge Street" (art by Phil Hester, in #11, 1994)
    - "14.2.99" (art by Dave Johnson, in #12, 1994)
    - "The Murders on the Rue Morgue" (art by Neil Gaiman, in #13, 1994)
    - "Fires I Wish I'd Seen" (art by Colleen Doran, in #14, 1994)
    - "Madame October" (art by Terry Moore, in #16, 1994)
    - "The Hair of the Snake That Bit Me" (art by Bill Koeb, in #17, 1994)
    - "Trampling Tokyo" (art by Art Adams, in #18, 1994)
    - "Litvinov's Book" (art by Richard Pace, in #19, 1995)
    - "Chiaroscuro" (art by Dave Gibbons, in #25, 1995)
    - "Me and Dorothy Parker" (art by Michael Gaydos, in #26, 1995)
    - "Rose Madder" (art by James Owen, in #28, 1995)
    - "Leopard Man at C&A's" (art by Jordan Raskin, in #35, 1996)
  - "Town of Lights" (art by Mark Scott Ricketts, in #37, 1996)
- Vampirella/Dracula: The Centennial: "The New European" (with Gary Frank, anthology one-shot, Harris, 1997)
  - Collected in The Best of Vampirella Volume 1: Lost Tales (tpb, 144 pages, Dynamite, 2008, ISBN 0-9106-9287-4)
  - Collected in Vampirella Masters Series Volume 4: Visionaries (tpb, 144 pages, Dynamite, 2011, ISBN 1-60690-209-1)
- Nightmare Theater #4: "Itchy Peterson: Just Born Lucky, I Guess" (with Val Semeiks, anthology, Chaos!, 1997)

== Prose and poetry ==
=== Short stories ===
==== Uncollected ====
Year	Title	Source	Publisher	Notes
1970	"To the Humfo"	Weird Window #1		
1971	"Shrine of the Lizard"	Weird Window #2		Published with an illustration by Moore
1981	"Terror Couple Kill Telegram Sam in the Flat Field...and Other Bauhaus Nightmares"	Sounds (14 Feb)	Spotlight Publications	Published under the pseudonym "Curt Vile"
1981	"Here Comes the Jetsons"	Sounds (4 Apr)	Spotlight Publications	Published under the pseudonym "Curt Vile"
1981	"Mystery and Abomination"	Sounds (8 Aug)	Spotlight Publications	Published under the pseudonym "Curt Vile"
1984	"Sawdust Memories"	Knave vol. 16 #13	Galaxy Publications	
1991	"The Children's Hour"	Now We are Sick	DreamHaven	ISBN 0-9630944-1-6
1995	"The Courtyard"	The Starry Wisdom	Creation Books	ISBN 1-871592-32-1
1995	"Recognition"	Dust: A Creation Books Reader	Creation Books	ISBN 1-87159-244-5
1995	"Zaman's Hill"	Dust: A Creation Books Reader	Creation Books	ISBN 1-87159-244-5
1995	"Light of Thy Countenance"	Forbidden Acts	Avon	ISBN 0-380-77915-3
1995	"Outbreaks of Violets"	Outbreaks of Violets: Random Acts of Kindness	Deadline Publications	Story told over 24 postcards, designed by Rian Hughes and given away at the MTV Europe Music Awards 1995; Published with illustrations by various artists (Note: Mique Beltrán • Max Cabanes • Mick McMahon • Baru • Francesca Ghermandi • Javier Mariscal • Jean-Philippe Stassen • Kellie Strom • Francois Avril • Isabel Kreitz • Rachael Ball • Max Andersson • Stefano Ricci • Francois Boucq • Jamie Hewlett • Max • Edmond Baudoin • Ed Pinsent • Jacques de Loustal • John M. Burns • Joakim Pirinen • Lorenzo Mattotti • Christian Gorny • Ever Meulen)
1999	"The Serpent and the Sword"	Tales of Midnight: Kosovo Refugee Benefit Special	Blue Silver Entertainment	Published with illustrations by Mike Fiamanya
2000	"Sidewalk Jockeys"	Unknown Quantities	Funny Valentine Press	Published with an illustration by Guy Davis
2002	"Fuseli's Disease"	The Thackery T. Lambshead Pocket Guide to Eccentric and Discredited Diseases	Night Shade	ISBN 1-892389-54-1
2004	"Where I Hid the Gold on Honey Island"	Technical Vocabularies: Games for May	Somnium Press	Published with an illustration by Moore
2004	"Gatecrashers"	Technical Vocabularies: Games for May	Somnium Press	Published with an illustration by Moore
2004	"The Mirror of Love"	The Mirror of Love	Top Shelf	ISBN 1-8918-3045-7; Published with photographs by José Villarrubia
2004	"The Mirror of Love"	The Mirror of Love	Top Shelf	Previously published as a short comic with art by Rick Veitch and Stephen R. Bissette in the AARGH! anthology one-shot (Mad Love, 1988)
2007	"Alphabets of Desire"	Alphabets of Desire	Todd Klein	Art print designed and lettered by Klein
2011	"Objects Discovered in a Novel Under Construction"	The Thackery T. Lambshead Cabinet of Curiosities	Harper Voyager	ISBN 0-0620-0475-1
2015	"The Town Planning in Dreams"	Test Centre #6	Test Centre Publications	

==== Collected ====
Illuminations: Stories (Bloomsbury Publishing, 2022, ISBN 1-635-57880-9)
Title	Year	Originally published in	Originally published by	Notes
"Hypothetical Lizard"	1987	Liavek: Wizard's Row	Ace Books	ISBN 0-441-48190-6; Published as "A Hypothetical Lizard"
"Not Even Legend"	2021	Uncertainties: Volume V	Swan River Press	ISBN 1-78380-038-0
"Location, Location, Location"				
"Cold Reading"	2016	Dead Funny: Encore	Salt Publishing	ISBN 1-78463-039-X
"The Improbably Complex High-Energy State"	2021	New Worlds	PS Publishing	ISBN 1-7863-6722-X
"Illuminations"				
"What We Can Know About Thunderman"				
"American Light: An Appreciation (by C. F. Bird)"				
"And, at the Last, Just to Be Done with Silence"				

=== Novels ===
Year	Title	Series	Publisher	ISBN
1996	Voice of the Fire		Gollancz	0-575-05249-X (Paperback, 320 pages)
2016	Jerusalem		Knockabout	0-86166-252-0 (Hardcover, 1,266 pages)
2024	The Great When	Long London	Bloomsbury Publishing	1-5266-4322-7 (Hardcover, 336 pages)
2026	I Hear a New World	Long London	Bloomsbury Publishing	1-5266-4329-4 (Hardcover, 336 pages)

== Non-fiction ==
- Marvel Super-Heroes #389: "A Short History of Britain" (three-page article in the magazine of various reprints of Marvel comics, Marvel UK, 1982)
- The Daredevils #1–11 (comics-related articles and fanzine reviews in the magazine of various reprints of Marvel comics, Marvel UK, 1983) including:
  - "The Importance of Being Frank" (about Frank Miller's run on Daredevil, in #1)
  - "Stan Lee: Blinded by the Hype (An Affectionate Character Assassination)" (in #3–4)
  - "Invisible Girls and Phantom Ladies" (about sexism in comics, in #4–6)
  - "O Superman" (about the realtionship between comics and music, in #5)
- Infinity #7–8: "Too Avant Guarde for the Mafia?" (essay on Arcade in the comics fanzine, Infinity Magazines, 1984–1985)
- Escape #6: "Comics USA" (travel diary detailing Moore's first trip to New York City, three-page article in the magazine, Escape Publishing, 1985)
- Fantasy Advertiser #92–95: "Writing for Comics" (four-part essay in the fanzine relating Moore's experiences and advice as a professional writer of comics, 1985–1986)
  - The essay was reprinted in three parts as "Alan Moore on Writing" in issues #119–121 of the American comics-related magazine The Comics Journal (Fantagraphics, 1988)
  - The essay, along with a new chapter written in 2003 and illustrations by Jacen Burrows, was collected as Alan Moore's Writing for Comics (sc, 48 pages, Avatar, 2003, ISBN 1-59291-012-2)
- Critters #23: "The True Story of the Rise and Fall of the Sinister Ducks" (two-page article on Moore's band The Sinister Ducks with an illustration by Doug Erb, anthology, Fantagraphics, 1988)
- BLAB! #3: "Comments on Crumb" (short essay about the works of Robert Crumb in the comics-related magazine, among other writers and artists, Kitchen Sink, 1988)
- The Puma Blues #20: "A Manifesto for Creators" (three-page essay co-written by several writers and artists, (Note: Contibutors credited besides Moore: Stephen R. Bissette • Dave Gibbons • Peter Laird • Frank Miller • Stephen Murphy • Dave Sim • John Totleben • Rick Veitch • Michael Zulli) Aardvark-Vanaheim, 1988)
- The Comics Journal #167 (untitled tribute/obituary for Jack Kirby in a section of the issue dedicated to him, among other writers and artists, Fantagraphics, 1994)
- The Midian Mailer #2: "Beyond Our Ken" (review of Against the Light by Kenneth Grant in the counterculture and occult-themed fanzine, Midian Books, 1998)
- H. P. Lovecraft's The Haunter of the Dark and Other Creative Visions: "The Great Old Ones" (kaballah of Lovecraft's gods, Oneiros Books, 2000, ISBN 1-902197-02-X)
- Arthur (counterculture-themed magazine published by Floating World Comics):
  - "Rolling Commentary" (essay on the "war on terror", in #5, 2003)
  - "Indoor Thunder" (essay on the life and works of musician Brian Eno, in #17, 2005)
  - "Bog Venus vs. Nazi Cock-Ring" (essay on the history of pornography and art, in #25, 2006)
    - Published as a separate illustrated volume under the title 25,000 Years of Erotic Freedom (96 pages, Abrams, 2009, ISBN 0-8109-4846-X)
  - "Cartographer of the American Dreamtime" (essay on the life and works of Moore's longtime collaborator and friend Rick Veitch, in #33, 2013)
- London: City of Disappearances: "Unearthing" (essay on Moore's longtime friend and collaborator Steve Moore in the book on London, 672 pages, Hamish Hamilton, 2006, ISBN 0-241-14299-7)
  - Published as a separate volume with photographs by Mitch Jenkins under the title Unearthing (hc, 184 pages, Knockabout, 2013, ISBN 0-8616-6181-8; sc, Top Shelf, 2013, ISBN 1-6030-9151-3)
  - A spoken-word album adaptation, directed by Jenkins and narrated by Moore, was released via Lex Records under the title Unearthing (2010)
- Fossil Angels (treatise on magic, originally written for the unpublished issue #15 of the occult-themed magazine KAOS, first published online in two parts in 2010)
- Strange Attractor Journal #4: "Between the Angels and the Apes" (libretto for an opera based on the life of John Dee, Strange Attractor Press, 2011, ISBN 0-9548-0546-1)
  - The opera was intended to be a collaboration between Moore and Damon Albarn's Gorillaz but the project was abandoned.
- Occupy Comics #1–3: "Buster Brown at the Barricades" (six-part essay on comics and counterculture, Black Mask Studios, 2013)
- Locus #647 (untitled essay/tribute to the works of Michael Moorcock in a section of the issue dedicated to him, among other writers, Locus Publications, 2014)
- Lord of Strange Deaths: "Limehouse Variations" (essay on Fu Manchu for the book dedicated to Sax Rohmer, 408 pages, Strange Attractor Press, 2015, ISBN 1-90722-225-1)
- Spirits of Place: "Coal Memory" (essay on Newcastle upon Tyne for the book about psychogeography, 306 pages, Daily Grail Publishing, 2016, ISBN 0-9946-1763-1)
- The Moon and Serpent Bumper Book of Magic (a grimoire co-written by Moore with Steve Moore and illustrated by various artists, 352 pages, Top Shelf, 2024, ISBN 1-60309-550-0)

== Audio recordings ==
- The Sinister Ducks — "March of the Sinister Ducks" b/w "Old Gangsters Never Die" (7-inch vinyl single, Situation Two, 1983)
  - The short-lived band consisted of Moore (providing the lyrics and lead vocals, credited as "Translucia Baboon"), David J and Alex Green.
  - "March of the Sinister Ducks" was re-released as a B-side on the flexi-disc supplement to Critters #23 (anthology, Fantagraphics, 1988)
- Hexentexts: "Hair of the Snake That Bit Me" (spoken-word track in the compilation album, musical accompaniment by Tim Perkins, Codex Books, 1994)
- The Birth Caul (spoken-word album with musical accompaniment by David J and Tim Perkins, Charrm, 1996)
  - Parts of the album were recorded live during Moore's performance in Newcastle upon Tyne on 18 November 1995.
  - The album was adapted into comics as The Birth Caul (written, drawn and published by Eddie Campbell, one-shot, 1999)
  - The Birth Caul adaptation was later collected in A Disease of Language (hc, 160 pages, Knockabout, 2006, ISBN 0-86166-153-2)
- The Moon and Serpent Grand Egyptian Theatre of Marvels (spoken-word album with musical accompaniment by David J and Tim Perkins, Cleopatra Records, 1996)
- Brought to Light (spoken-word album with musical accompaniment by Gary Lloyd, adapted from Moore's comic book story "Shadowplay", Codex Books, 1998)
- The Highbury Working: A Beat Séance (spoken-word album with musical accompaniment by Tim Perkins, Re:, 2000)
- Angel Passage (spoken-word album based on the life of William Blake, musical accompaniment by Tim Perkins, Re:, 2002)
- Snakes and Ladders (spoken-word album with musical accompaniment by Tim Perkins, Re:, 2003)
  - Parts of the album were recorded live during Moore's performance in London on 10 April 1999.
  - The performance was adapted into comics as Snakes and Ladders (written, drawn and published by Eddie Campbell, one-shot, 2001)
  - The Snakes and Ladders adaptation was later collected in A Disease of Language (hc, 160 pages, Knockabout, 2006, ISBN 0-86166-153-2)
- Nation of Saints: "You are My Asylum" (with Joe Brown, musical track in the compilation album released as a free supplement to Dodgem Logic, 2009)
  - Moore and Brown have recorded and released two more musical tracks in the following years:
    - "The Decline of English Murder" (released online in support of Occupy Wall Street, 2012)
    - "Mandrillifesto" (released online and as a 7-inch vinyl single in response to the post-Brexit political climate, A Fools Leap, 2017)
- Unearthing (spoken-word album with musical accompaniment by Andrew Broder and Adam Drucker, adapted from Moore's essay of the same name, Lex Records, 2010)
- Eddie Enrico and His Hawaiian Hotshots — "Immortal Love" b/w "Home with You" (7-inch vinyl single recorded by Moore with Tim Perkins, Knockabout, 2012)
  - The single was released as a free supplement to the first UK printing of The League of Extraordinary Gentlemen: Black Dossier.

== Screen adaptations ==
Year	Title	Credited as				Notes
Year	Title	Writer	Director	Producer	Role	Notes
1983	Ragnarok	Yes	No	No	No	Animated still image film; title character designed by Bryan Talbot
2001	From Hell	No	No	No	No	Adaptation of the eponymous series created by Moore and Eddie Campbell; Screenplay by Terry Hayes and Rafael Yglesias; directed by The Hughes Brothers
2003	The League of Extraordinary Gentlemen	No	No	No	No	Adaptation of the first volume of the eponymous series created by Moore and Kevin O'Neill; Screenplay by James Robinson; directed by Stephen Norrington
2004	Justice League Unlimited	No	No	No	No	Episode "For the Man Who Has Everything" is based on the story of the same name Teleplay by J. M. DeMatteis; directed by Dan Riba
2006	V for Vendetta	No	No	No	No	Adaptation of the eponymous series created by Moore and David Lloyd; Screenplay by The Wachowskis; directed by James McTeigue; Moore's name is removed from the film's credits at his request
2009	Watchmen	No	No	No	No	Adaptation of the eponymous series created by Moore and Dave Gibbons; Screenplay by David Hayter and Alex Tse; directed by Zack Snyder; Moore's name is removed from the film's credits at his request
2011	Green Lantern: Emerald Knights	No	No	No	No	Segment "Mogo Doesn't Socialize" is based on the short Mogo story of the same name Screenplay by Dave Gibbons; directed by Jay Oliva
2011	Green Lantern: Emerald Knights	No	No	No	No	Segment "Abin Sur" is based on the short Sodam Yat story "Tygers"; Screenplay by Geoff Johns; directed by Christopher Berkeley
2015	Show Pieces	Yes	No	No	Yes	Role: Frank Metterton; Umbrella title for a series of short films directed by Mitch Jenkins
2016	Supergirl	No	No	No	No	Episode "For the Girl Who Has Everything" is based on the Superman story "For the Man Who Has Everything"; Teleplay by Ted Sullivan and Derek Simon from a story by Andrew Kreisberg; directed by Dermott Downs
2016	Batman: The Killing Joke	No	No	No	No	Adaptation of the eponymous graphic novel Screenplay by Brian Azzarello; directed by Sam Liu
2019	Watchmen	No	No	No	No	Adaptation/sequel to the eponymous series created by Moore and Dave Gibbons; Television series executive produced by Damon Lindelof; Moore's name is removed from the series' credits at his request
2021	The Show	Yes	No	No	Yes	Role: Frank Metterton; Directed by Mitch Jenkins

== Works about Moore ==
- Parkin, Lance. The Pocket Essentials: Alan Moore. Pocket Essentials, 2001.
- Khoury, George. Kimota! The Miracleman Companion. TwoMorrows, 2001.
- Vylenz, DeZ (director). The Mindscape of Alan Moore. Shadowsnake Films, 2003. Documentary film.
- Spencer Millidge, Gary. Alan Moore: Portrait of an Extraordinary Gentleman. Abiogenesis Press, 2003.
- Khoury, George. The Extraordinary Works of Alan Moore. TwoMorrows, 2003.
- Nevins, Jess. Heroes and Monsters: The Unofficial Companion to the League of Extraordinary Gentlemen. MonkeyBrain, 2003.
- Nevins, Jess. A Blazing World: The Unofficial Companion to the Second League of Extraordinary Gentlemen. MonkeyBrain, 2004.
- Baker, Bill. Alan Moore Spells It Out. Airwave Publishing, 2005.
- Baker, Bill. Alan Moore's Exit Interview. Airwave Publishing, 2007.
- Nevins, Jess. Impossible Territories: An Unofficial Companion to the League of Extraordinary Gentlemen The Black Dossier. MonkeyBrain, 2008.
- Di Liddo, Annalisa. Alan Moore: Comics as Performance, Fiction as Scalpel. University Press of Mississippi, 2009.
- Spencer Millidge, Gary. Alan Moore: Storyteller. Ilex Press, 2011.
- Berlatsky, Eric. Alan Moore: Conversations. University Press of Mississippi, 2011.
- Todd, Comer and Sommers, Joseph Michael (editors). Sexual Ideology in the Works of Alan Moore. McFarland & Company, 2012.
- Parkin, Lance. Magic Words: The Extraordinary Life of Alan Moore. Aurum Press, 2014.
- Green, Matthew J. A (editor). Alan Moore and the Gothic Tradition. Manchester University Press, 2016.
- Carpenter, Greg. The British Invasion: Alan Moore, Neil Gaiman, Grant Morrison, and the Invention of the Modern Comic Book Writer. Sequart, 2016.
- Gray, Maggie. Alan Moore, Out from the Underground: Cartooning, Performance, and Dissent. Palgrave Macmillan, 2017.
- Sandifer, Elizabeth. The Last War in Albion Volume 1: The Early Work of Alan Moore and Grant Morrison. Eruditorum Press, 2019.
- Ayres, Jackson. Alan Moore: A Critical Guide. Bloomsbury USA Academic, 2021.
- Sandifer, Elizabeth. The Last War in Albion Volume 2: The Watchmen Bomb. Eruditorum Press, 2026.
