= The Moon and Serpent Grand Egyptian Theatre of Marvels =

Group of occultists and performers

The Moon and Serpent Grand Egyptian Theatre of Marvels is a group of occultists and performers including writer and magician Alan Moore, Bauhaus member David J, and musician Tim Perkins, who perform occult "workings" consisting of prose poetry set to music. Several of these "workings" have been released onto CD. It was also the name of the group's first performance piece which was released as a spoken word CD in 1996.

== History ==
The group formed in the mid-1990s, as part of Moore's " 'coming out' as a magician," described by Warren Ellis as "a return to his roots of performing from the days of the Northampton Arts Lab and the various bands along the way from there to here." David J and – particularly Tim Perkins provide "musical backdrop to Alan's monologues and verse... [sometimes] accompanied by a dancer." Some performances are recorded live, others are "recreated in the studio" after the fact.

== Performances (workings) ==
=== The Moon and Serpent Grand Egyptian Theatre of Marvels ===
The group's initial, self-titled "working" occurred in 1994. It was released on CD in 1996 on the Cleopatra label, (just a week after Birth Caul), and re-released in limited form in 1999/2000. The "most overtly occult," it was an exploration of magic, Glycon (a Roman snake deity) and "a tour of the wild magic of the London area the piece was being performed in."

Fellow writer Warren Ellis wrote in 2000 that parts of Moore's monologue "emerged first as introductory pieces to From Hell, [as well as in] the Iain Sinclair mockumentary-documentary for Channel 4... [entitled, "The Cardinal & the Corpse"; in which Moore appeared] as an occult fanatic trapped in a room with strange old books."

Tracks from the CD release have featured on other albums, with the first track – "The Hair of the Snake That Bit Me" – appearing in 1995 on Hexentexts, the Creation Books Sampler CD, for which Alan Moore drew the cover.

=== The Birth Caul ===
The trio's second performance (and technically their first CD release) was The Birth Caul (A Shamanism of Childhood), a spoken word piece by Moore with music by David J and Tim Perkins. The performance took place at the Old County Court in Newcastle-upon-Tyne, on 18 November 1995, and was released on 5 March 1996 by Charrm (CHARRMCD22).

The 'birth caul' itself a piece of the amniotic sac over a baby's head, present, very rarely, at birth, and traditionally kept as a good luck charm. Moore's text treats the caul as a map of humanity. With it, he examines the connections between language, identity and our perceptions of the world, regressing from early adulthood through adolescence, childhood and infancy to prenatal existence, in a quest for a primitive consciousness existing before language. In 2000, Warren Ellis described the working as

"possibly the most affecting thing Alan's yet written. It fulfils the promise of his novel, Voice of the Fire, and of BIG NUMBERS and the best bits of From Hell. This is Alan Moore summoning his powers and finally delivering a pure burst of the way he sees things, divorced from genre and obsession and postmodern gameplay and any of those other touchstones by which we habitually identify Alan Moore's work. It is very simply an examination of death, life and birth as we understand them today, explored by agency of the birth caul itself, the membrane over the face with which some children are born. The caul becomes a talisman, an instrument of divination leading us up and down the years of our lives."

In 1998, after completing the artwork for From Hell, Moore played the CD recording to artist Eddie Campbell, who immediately asked if he could do a pictorial interpretation; this was self-published by Campbell in 1999. In 2005, it was reprinted as part of Moore and Campbell's A Disease of Language. Warren Ellis called it an "excellent adaptation."

In 2003, "Unwrapping the Birth Caul", an essay examining the text, performance and comic by English teacher and comics reviewer Marc Singer was published in the 50th Birthday tribute book Alan Moore: Portrait of an Extraordinary Gentleman.

=== The Highbury Working, A Beat Séance ===
This was performed on 20 November 1997 at the performance club 'Absorption' at The Garage in Highbury by Moore and Perkins, with dancer Paule van Wijngaarden. The Absorption event was curated by Chris Brook who had met Moore when he was touring the K Foundation's £1m burning film, screened in Moore's living room a year earlier. Brook had invited Moore to present an event that might be somehow specific to the location of Highbury Corner in London. The CD was designed by John Coulthart and released in November 2000. During his study of the area, Moore looks at – among other things – the building of the football stadium (and the Arsenal football team itself), construction of the underground, Samuel Taylor Coleridge, and local gangsters.

Warren Ellis described it as an "evocation/invocation of a specific area... Highbury, in London" in the same mould as the group's initial, self-titled working. It comprises

"eight monologues" which "excavat[e] the bland face of Highbury to raise up its forgotten secrets, pains and glories. Art as archaeology; he raises the horse goddess worshipped by the Romans when Highbury was a garrison of the empire, and also the horse that fell into the pit on that spot and died when sewers were being dug over a thousand years later: Joe Meek, the troubled Phil Spector of England, and Aleister Crowley, the untroubled Great Beast of Cefalu.

==== The RE: label ====
Starting with the CD release of The Highbury Working, the Moon & Serpent group (Moore & Perkins)'s CDs were released on ex-Siouxsie and the Banshees songwriter and co-founder Steven Severin's record label RE: (1998–2003). Founded in 1998, RE: was Severin's independent label created primarily to "release 3 solo albums of commissioned music" Having released three albums (1998–2000), Severin "concentrated on developing the label by bringing on board the inestimable talents of comics legend, Alan Moore... [releasing] 3 spoken word albums by Alan Moore in collaboration with his musical partner, Tim Perkins."

Severin's RE: label released a number of diverse CDs over its five-year life, including three by the Moon & Serpent collective/Moore & Perkins.

A limited-edition print of the CD cover by John Coulthart was also sold.

=== Snakes and Ladders ===
Performed on 10 April 1999 at Conway Hall in Red Lion Square at a meeting of the Hermetic Order of the Golden Dawn by Moore, with music by Tim Perkins. It explored the local area and its magical associations, and dealt particularly with the disinterment of Oliver Cromwell and Elizabeth Siddell, and Arthur Machen's visionary experiences.

In 2001, it was adapted into comic-form by frequent collaborator Eddie Campbell, and in 2006. This was reprinted as part of the pair's A Disease of Language.

A CD – the collective's fifth – was released in 2003 by RE: (RE:CD05).

A comic book by Eddie Campbell giving a pictorial interpretation was published in 2001.

=== Angel Passage ===
This was performed on 2 February 2001 at The Purcell rooms as part of the "Tygers of Wrath" evening of readings and performances celebrating the life of William Blake. Moore and Perkins performed alongside Jah Wobble and Billy Bragg.

== CD releases ==
Five recorded versions of the groups performances have been released to date. Since 2000, these have been on the RE: label. In order of release, they are:

- The Birth Caul (Charm [CHARRMCD22], 1996)
- The Moon and Serpent Grand Egyptian Theatre of Marvels (Cleopatra [CLEO 96882], 1996)
- The Highbury Working, A Beat Séance (RE: [RE:PCD03], 2000)
- Angel Passage (RE: [RE:PCD04], 2001/2002)
- Snakes and Ladders (RE: [RE:PCD05], 2002/2003)

=== Other ===
Tracks from The Moon and Serpent Grand Egyptian Theatre of Marvels have appeared on other audio compilations.

- Hexentexts: A Creation Books Sampler (Codex [CODE1], 1994)

Features "The Hair of the Snake That Bit Me" and a cover by Moore.

- Cleopatra Records Presents Goth Box (Cleopatra [CLP 9798-2], 1996)

Features "The Enochian Angel of the 7th Aethyr" (credited to David J only)

- Gothic Legends 3CD Limited Edition Set (Cleopatra [CLP 0741-2], 1999)

Includes the previously released Grand Egyptian Theatre.. (1996) alongside Eva O's Past Time (1993) and Christian Death's Death in Detroit (1995).

== Text releases ==
=== A Disease of Language ===
Two of Moore's spoken-word pieces – The Birth Caul and Snakes & Ladders – were adapted by his From Hell artistic collaborator Eddie Campbell into self-published comic books in 1999 and 2001. These were collected, with additional interview material, in 2006 as A Disease of Language by Palmano Bennett and Knockabout Comics (ISBN 0861661532).

=== The Moon and Serpent Bumper Book of Magic ===
This book – written by Alan Moore with Steve Moore (Moore's mentor; no relation) – was due out from Top Shelf Productions in 2013 but was ultimately released in 2024. The book intends to be "a clear and practical grimoire of the occult sciences," containing "profusely illustrated instructional essays upon the Moon & Serpent Grand Egyptian Theatre of Marvels sect's theories of magic" from c. 150 AD to the present.

== See also ==
- List of published material by Alan Moore
