= The Moon and Serpent Bumper Book of Magic =

Nonfiction book by Moore and Moore

Publication information
- Publisher: Top Shelf Productions / Knockabout Comics
- Format: Hardcover

Creative team
- Written by: Alan Moore and Steve Moore
- Artist(s): Kevin O'Neill, Melinda Gebbie, John Coulthart, Steve Parkhouse, Rick Veitch and Ben Wickey .

Collected editions
- Top Shelf: ISBN 978-1-60309-001-8

The Moon and Serpent Bumper Book of Magic is a work of nonfiction by Alan Moore and Steve Moore (no relation). The creators, in addition to comics scripts, had cofounded a private magical order known as The Moon and Serpent Grand Egyptian Theatre of Marvels. In early February 2024,Top Shelf Productions and Knockabout Comics announced a publication date of 15 October 2024.

== Scope ==
The book is intended to be "a clear and practical grimoire of the occult sciences," containing "profusely illustrated instructional essays" on theories of magic from c. 150 AD to the present of the Moon and Serpent Grand Egyptian Theatre of Marvels sect, of whom Alan Moore is a dedicated follower. Indeed, both Moores are described by publisher Top Shelf Productions as the "current proprietors" of the group of occult performers, of whom Alan Moore is a particularly prominent member, alongside former Bauhaus bassist David J. The "Moon and Serpent" group have released a number of spoken word CD releases of their occult "workings"/performances.

== Contents ==
Confirmed illustrators include a number of (Alan) Moore's frequent collaborators, namely Kevin O’Neill, John Coulthart, Steve Parkhouse, Rick Veitch, Melinda Gebbie, and Ben Wickey.

Among the essays the book will include is "Adventures in Thinking," a dissertation detailing "how entry into the world of magic may be readily achieved." The tongue-in-cheek tone of the tome will also include "a number of 'Rainy Day' activity pages" suggesting "lively and entertaining things-to-do once the magical state has been attained, including such popular pastimes as divination, etheric travel and the conjuring of a colourful multitude of spirits, deities, dead people and infernal entities from the pit." This will probably incorporate a "bestiary of demons and gods and other things that you might be lucky or unfortunate enough to bump into."

The two Moores – unrelated, but long-time friends – will also write "lengthy theses revealing the ultimate meaning of both the Moon and the Serpent."

=== The great enchanters ===
The book will present a "history of magic from the last ice-age to the present day, told in a series of easy-to-absorb pictorial biographies of fifty great enchanters," an area in which both Moores are readily familiar, Alan having been a practising magician for a number of years, and Steve having contributed to the Fortean Times journal since its earliest days, the paranormal, occult and magic itself being extremely familiar areas covered by that publication. This section, tentatively entitled "Old Moore's Lives of the Great Enchanters" is described by A. Moore as around "fifty-two full pages.. laid out a bit like the old Ripley's Believe it or Not, where you've got five panels with captions" describing the illustrations. These "great enchanters" will cover key individuals in the history of magic beginning with the alleged "first representation of a magician" – "the Dancing Sorcerer from the Trois Freres cave in France."

Other notable individuals will include "the Persian Magi and Zarathustra" ("after the Stone Age shamanic period... the first record of actual magic") and various other real, fictional and debatable individuals including "King Solomon, Circe, Medea... Apollonius of Tyana [and] Merlin... the first white magician." Coverage will also be given to those individuals who "almost certainly existed, like Roger Bacon and people like that." Kevin O'Neill (co-creator with A. Moore of The League of Extraordinary Gentlemen) is set to illustrate a "seven or eight-page life of Alexander... done in a Radio Fun style... detail[ling] the life of Alexander of Abonuteichos who was the creator of Glycon," Alan's "patron deity."

== Additional materials ==
A "full range of entertainments will be provided" in addition, including "a lavishly decorated decadent pulp tale of occult adventure recounted in the serial form", "a full set of this sinister and deathless cult's never-before-seen Tarot cards" (illustrated by José Villarrubia), "a fold-out Kabalistic board game" and "a pop-up Theatre of Marvels that serves as both a Renaissance memory theatre and a handy portable shrine." This (theatre) is being designed by Moore's wife, Melinda Gebbie.

By 2024 when the book was announced by John Coulthart the creation of tarot cards had been discarded but there was to be a chapter about the tarot.

== Related works ==
Alan Moore's work includes several diversions into the realms of the "magickal", including his America's Best Comics series Promethea, both a general meditation on magic in comics form and a specific guide to the 22 Major Arcana Tarot cards (issue #12), the Sephiroth (issue #14) and the entire Hermetic Qabalah (issues #13–25). Promethea featured Dr. John Dee, Aleister Crowley, Austin Osman Spare and Jack Parsons, all prominent occultists likely to be covered in the Bumper Book of Magic.

It has been argued that much of Alan Moore's output up to 2007 was designed as magical ritual, though on a metaphysical level:

All of Moore's recent comics and other texts that are intended to function as magical "workings" or rituals, perform the work of making something metaphysically real though a work of imagination and communication, as with the culminatory "there because we say She is" that births the Angel Highbury at the end of his psychogeographic spoken-word piece, The Highbury Working.
