= John Coulthart =

British artist (born 1962)

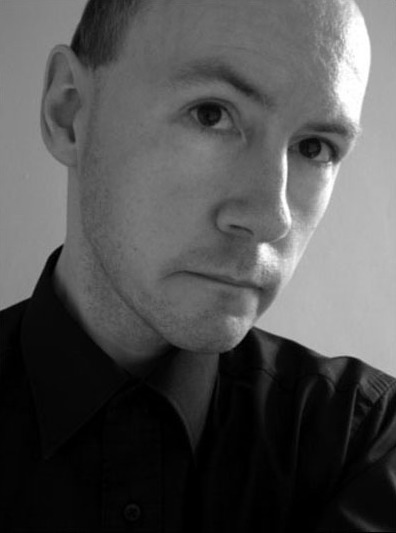
- Born: John Coulthart; 15 March 1962 (age 64); England, UK
- Occupations: Graphic artist, illustrator, author, designer
- Writing career
- Genres: Science fiction, fiction, non-fiction, occult, horror, steampunk
- Notable works: The Haunter of the Dark: And Other Grotesque Visions, Lord Horror: Reverbstorm
- Website: johncoulthart.com

John Coulthart (born 15 March 1962) is a British graphic artist, illustrator, author and designer who has produced book covers and illustrations, CD covers and posters. He is also the author of the critically acclaimed Lovecraft-inspired book The Haunter of the Dark: And Other Grotesque Visions which contains a collaboration with Alan Moore entitled The Great Old Ones that is unique to this book and also has an introduction by Alan Moore.

He has maintained an online journal of his work and interests, titled { feuilleton }, on his website since February 2006.

He was nominated for a British Fantasy Award, for Best Artist, in 2005. In 2012 he won the Artist of the Year award at the World Fantasy Awards.

== Design and illustration ==
In the music field, he has designed promotional art and CD covers and packaging for the heavy metal group Cradle of Filth, Hawkwind and Steven Severin. He also created the poster and cover art for spoken-word albums by writer Alan Moore.

Within the field of literature, he also worked with Colin Wilson and on a lavish Savoy Books edition of David Lindsay's A Voyage to Arcturus. He has designed the covers for many contemporary Steampunk novels.

He designed (and contributed an entry to) the anthology work The Thackery T Lambshead Pocket Guide to Eccentric & Discredited Diseases and also its sequel The Thackery T Lambshead Cabinet of Curiosities. He has also produced numerous cover illustrations for Arthur Magazine.

== Comics work and adaptation ==
He has done much work based upon the writings of H. P. Lovecraft, adapting "The Haunter of the Dark", "The Call of Cthulhu" and "The Dunwich Horror" to the page. His adaptation of "The Picture of Dorian Gray" done as 10 pages of collages appears as the last story in volume 2 of The Graphic Canon.
He is also noted for illustrating the Lord Horror comic book written by David Britton, produced by Savoy Books and republished as a 344-page book entitled Lord Horror: Reverbstorm in February 2013.

== Other work ==
Coulthart has also provided card art for the collectible card game Magic: The Gathering.

In 2006 he designed the film posters and the entire DVD packaging and menu interface for the documentary feature film The Mindscape of Alan Moore.

Coulthart has also designed the cover art of the album "Steps of Descent", by the death metal band Cyaegha. The album is based on the works of H. P. Lovecraft.

He contributed 30 film reviews and 4 essays to the book Horror: The Definitive Guide to the Cinema of Fear. He has done illustrations and the cover design for The Moon & Serpent Bumper Book of Magic by Alan Moore and Steve Moore. The book was published by Top Shelf Productions in 2024. Other future projects include a series of novels the first one of which is entitled Axiom.
