= Jerusalem (Moore novel) =

Novel by English author Alan Moore (2016)

- Author: Alan Moore
- Language: English
- Set in: Northampton, England
- Published: September 2016
- Publisher: Knockabout (UK), Liveright (US)
- Media type: Print (Hardcover)
- Pages: 1,266
- ISBN: 978-0-86166-252-4 (UK), 978-1-63149-134-4 (US)

Jerusalem is a novel by English author Alan Moore, almost wholly set in and around the author's home town of Northampton, England. Combining elements of historical and supernatural fiction and drawing on a range of writing styles, the author describes it as a work of "genetic mythology". Published in 2016, Jerusalem took a decade to write. The novel is divided into three books, "The Boroughs", "Mansoul", and "Vernall's Inquest".

== Overview ==
The story develops over centuries, set in the Boroughs, the most ancient neighbourhood in Northampton. The colophon states that the book is based on a true story; it concerns a large collection of characters: some mythical, some fictional, and some historical. Along with his family's oral traditions, life experience, and ideas (such as eternalism) that he had explored in other writings, Moore's research sources included a collection of interviews entitled “In Living Memory — Life in ‘The Boroughs,’” published by the Northampton Arts Development in 1987, as well as old Kelly's directories.

A key narrative arc culminates in 2006 with an exhibit of paintings by one of the characters, Alma Warren, who is indicated by the author portrait and its caption, present on the book's jacket, to be a stand-in for Moore. Several events in the story are retold with different characters as the focaliser, with the writing style adapted to the focal character's inner voice, in a way that unites otherwise disconnected narrative threads. The book includes chapters in the style of Samuel Beckett, James Joyce, as well as a chapter written in verse, while the entire second Book is somewhat in the style of a children's novel (a "savage, hallucinating Enid Blyton," according to Moore in a 2008 interview with the BBC).

The novel's title is a reference to the poem "And did those feet in ancient time" by William Blake, which was set to music and given the title "Jerusalem" by Hubert Parry. Prominent themes include "poverty, wealth, history, the evolution of English as a visionary language" as well as "madness, ghosts, and the confusion of dreams, visions, memories, and premonitions."

After the death of Moore's editor Steve Moore (no relation), he worked with three editors on the book, Donna Scott, editor of the Best of British Science Fiction anthology series, writer and cultural historian John Higgs and writer Alistair Fruish. In the acknowledgements section of the book, Moore credits Fruish with supplying information that allowed him to reveal "the gas street origins of free market capitalism and the industrial revolution" in the book.

== Editions ==
The UK and US editions differ: the Knockabout edition is 1,180 pages long and is set in a small point size, whereas the Liveright edition is set in a larger point size and consequently is 1,266 pages long, and features a different author photo on the jacket. Alongside the one-volume hardcover first edition, Jerusalem was simultaneously released in a three-volume slipcased paperback edition, and as an unabridged audio book narrated by Simon Vance, published by Recorded Books, Inc. The front cover (or, respectively, the slipcover for the three-volume paperback edition) depicts several key scenes and characters from the novel in the form of a diorama. Each of the three Books begins with an epigram and photographic illustration (comprising cover illustrations for the slipcased volumes).
