= Sergio Bleda =

Spanish comics artist

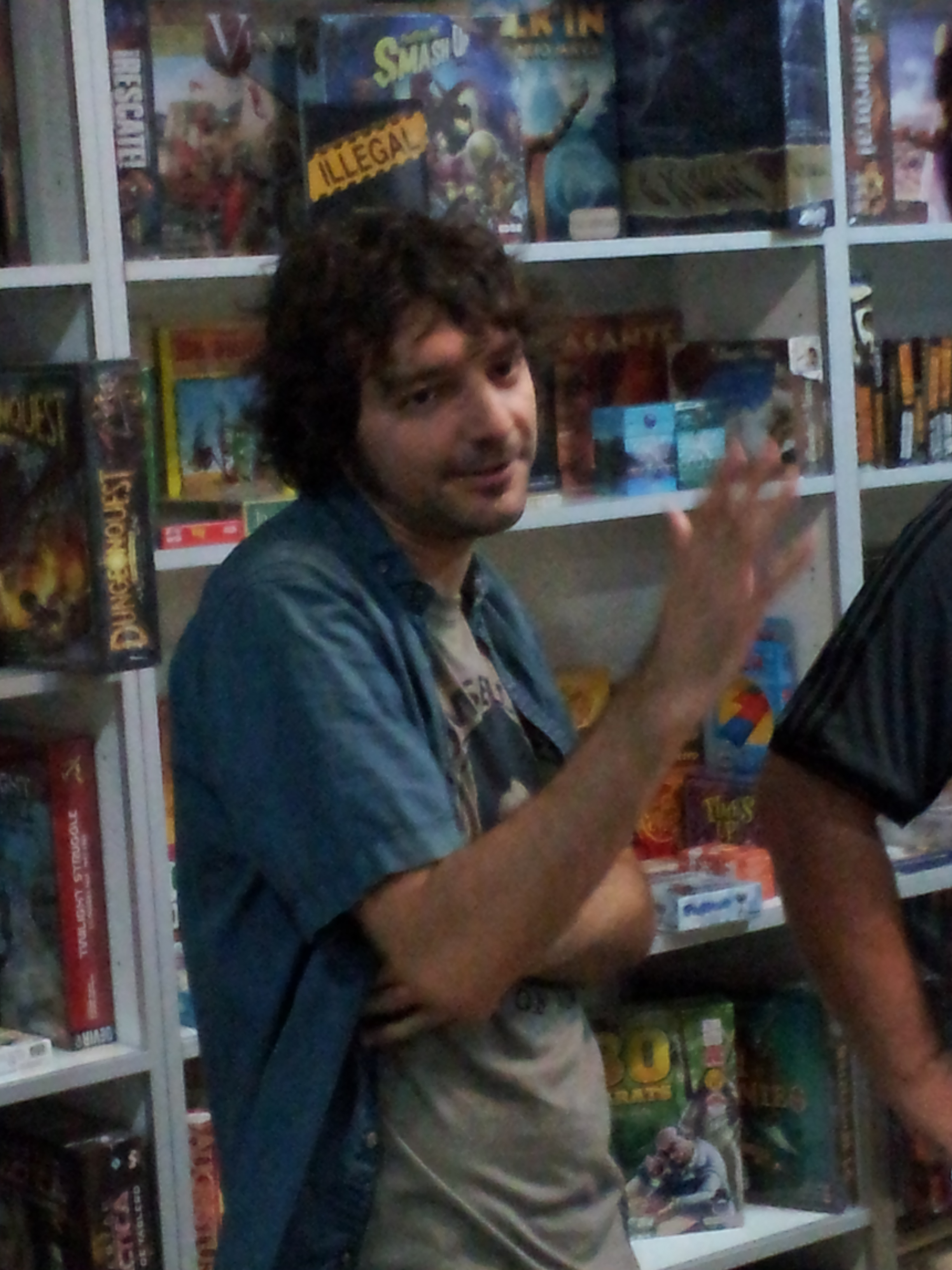
- Sergio Bleda a València (2014).
- Born: 27 July 1974
- Occupation: Illustrator

Sergio Bleda Villada (born 27 July 1974) is a Spanish comics artist, known mainly for his horror comics, such as El baile del vampiro (Vampire Dance) although he has also cultivated other genres and worked in illustration, especially erotica, advertising and production design for cinema. His works have been published in several European countries and the United States.

== Biography ==
=== Career ===
Bleda was born in Albacete. Basically self-taught, he left high school in the second year of secondary school to dedicate himself fully to comics. He began his career by publishing a newspaper strip entitled Los saurios in the local weekly Crónica between 1991 and 1995, as well as several comic strips in fanzines.

In the mid-90s, he moved to Barcelona, where he shared an apartment with Javier Pulido and began to collaborate in the erotic magazine Kiss Comix, to which he would contribute series such as La novia y la ladrona (1994), Melrose Pleasure (1996) and Hot Rockets (1988) (the last two with Rakel's script), as well as publishing the graphic novel El Hijo de Kim (1994–95) and several pin-ups of Marvel superheroes for Planeta DeAgostini. His leap to popularity would come, however, with the limited series El Baile del Vampiro, published in 1997 by Planeta within its Laberinto line and that would earn him a nomination for the Prize for Promising New Author at the Barcelona Comic Fair in 1998, which was republished in 2008 by Aleta.

Established since 1999 in Valencia, he published the one-shot Inés 1994 for Planeta and continued producing erotic comics for MegaMultimedia, Sulaco Ediciones and Dolmen magazines, at the same time he made the storyboards for the films Son de mar by Bigas Luna (2001) and No somos nadie by Jordi Mollà (2002).

He is also curator of the collective exhibition "Tebeospain" organized by the Biblioteca Valenciana and the Asociación de Autores de Cómic de España, an organization of which he was a founding member in 2002 and President from January 2006 to March 2007.

In 2008 he published in Spain Dolls Killer, an integral volume edited by Dolmen that collects the series co-created for the French publisher Soleil with the scriptwriter Nicolás Pona and 20 años entre pinceles: El arte de Sergio Bleda, a retrospective book edited by Dibbuks that collects the best of his 20 years of professional career.

In 2019 he published, through crowdfunding and under his Sergio Bleda Autogestión Editorial label, a new installment of El Baile del Vampiro titled REDES. In 2020 he repeated the formula and published El Baile del Vampiro: RUINA MONTIUM. That same year he published a book of his erotic art, #Fetish Brush. In 2022 he has published a compilation of his strip Los Saurios. Comprehensive in collaboration with independent publisher Dawn Entertainment.

=== Foreign market ===
Since 2003, he has directed his efforts towards the foreign market, given the impossibility of making a living from the local industry, and produces for the first time his first albums conceived as such: Duérmete niña (Sleep, Little Girl) that same year, Bloody Winter in 2004 and the trilogy La Conjura de cada miércoles (The Wednesday Conspiracy) between 2005 and 2007, all of which were distributed through the European agency SAF. Vampire Dance and The Wednesday Conspiracy were published in the United States by Dark Horse Books.

In 2008, he started directly for the French publisher Soleil the trilogy Dolls Killer, with scripts by Nicolas Pona, which would finally consist of two albums. He also illustrated the children's book 33 abuelas by Luis Cauqui.

In 2018 he illustrated Il faudra me passer sur le corps, with the writer Katia Even.

== Works ==
- Los Saurios: Evolución. Seslpublished, 1993.
- La novia y la ladrona. Written by Rakel. Revista Kiss Comix. Ediciones La Cúpula, 1994.
- El hijo de Kim. Plaga, 1995.
- Melrose pleasure. Written by Rakel. Revista Kiss Comix. Ediciones La Cúpula, 1996.
- El baile del vampiro. Planeta deAgostini, 1997.
- Hot rockets. Written by Rakel. Revista Kiss Comix. Ediciones La Cúpula, 1998
- Inés 1994. Planeta deAgostini, 1999.
- The Hair of the Snake. 10 pages and cover. Sulaco, 2000.
- Duérmete niña. Strip Art Features, 2003. Dolmen, 2003.
- "¡Schtroumpf!, una aventura de Jakob el vampiro", story published in Boom! magazine n.º 1. Asociación de Autores de Cómic de España, 2004. Guion de Alberto López Aroca.
- Bloody winter. Strip Art Features, 2004. Planeta DeAgostini, 2005.
- The Wednesday Conspiracy 1: Sectas y paranoias. Strip art features, 2005.
- The Wednesday Conspiracy 2: Encrucijada. Strip art features, 2006.
- The Wednesday Conspiracy 3: Restless people. Strip art features, 2007.
- El Baile del Vampiro. Tenth anniversary edition. Aleta, 2008.
- Doll's Killer T1. Soleil, 2008.
- Doll's Killer T2. Soleil, 2009.
- 33 abuelas. Dibbuks, 2009
- 12 del Doce: Guerrilleros. Diputación de Cádiz, 2010.
- Candy City Guion de Alberto López Aroca. Ilarión, 2010.
- 20 Años entre pinceles: El arte de Sergio Bleda. Dibbuks, 2011.
- Valentía. Colectivo. Norma editorial, 2012.
- Esto vende. Grafito, 2015.
- NSA T1. Guion de Thierry Glorís. Casterman, 2015.
- Una tarde de pasión. Guion de Ricardo Esteban. Dibbuks, 2015.
- NSA T2. Guion de Thierry Glorís. Casterman, 2016.
- Eve Moon. El Hada Perdida. Cuocio, 2017.
- Cinco relatos apasionados. Guion de Ricardo Esteban. Dibbuks, 2017.
- Fundamentos instintivos de una noche de invierno. Text by Fernando Girón, 2018.
- Il Faudra me Passer Sur le Corps. Written by Katia Even. Tabou, 2019.
- Redes/La primera vez. Sergio Bleda Autogestión Editorial, 2020.
- Fetish Brush. Sergio Bleda Autogestión Editorial, 2020.
- Ruina Montium. Guion Francisco Ruizge. Sergio Bleda Autogestión Editorial, 2021.
- Los Saurios Integral. Sergio Bleda Autogestión Editorial y Dawn Entertainment, 2022.
