= A Disease of Language =

2005 book

A Disease of Language is the 2005 collection of adaptations by Eddie Campbell of two of Alan Moore's performances, The Birth Caul (1999) and Snakes and Ladders (2001). It is rounded by a 2002 interview of Moore conducted by Campbell for Egomania 2 and sketches. It is published by Palmano Bennett in association with Knockabout.

== The Birth Caul ==
In 1995 Alan Moore had recently revealed himself as a practicing magician. He did a spoken word performance called The Birth Caul (A Shamanism of Childhood) with music by David J and Tim Perkins, which was soon released on CD. It was staged at the Old County Court in Newcastle upon Tyne on 18 November 1995.

The birth caul is a portion of birth membrane sometimes present at birth covering the head, face or rarely the entire body like a veil or a second skin. It denotes that the child will possess gifts of the sixth sense, and so is often dried and kept traditionally as a protective talisman. When Moore's mother dies he finds her birth caul amongst her effects. The Caul represents a map of humanity which Moore proceeds to read from. The text is essentially an examination of the connections between our language, our identity and our perceptions of the world. The narration regresses from early adulthood, adolescence, childhood, infancy and prenatal existence in a quest for a primitive consciousness existing before language. Ultimately the quest aborts as there are no words to describe that consciousness.

In 1998, after completing From Hell, Campbell visited Moore and he played the CD recording to him. He asked Alan Moore if he could do a pictorial setting and he published it himself in 1999.

In 2003 an essay, "Unwrapping the Birth Caul", written by English teacher and comics reviewer Marc Singer, was published in Alan Moore: Portrait of an Extraordinary Gentleman.

== Snakes and Ladders ==
This was a performance given on 10 April 1999 at Conway Hall in Red Lion Square, with music by Tim Perkins. It deals with the disinterment of Oliver Cromwell and Elizabeth Siddal and with Arthur Machen's visionary experiences.

The Eddie Campbell adaptation was published in 2001. The CD was released in 2003.

== Publication ==
- A Disease of Language (adapted by Eddie Campbell, from "The Birth Caul" and "Snakes and Ladders" with interview from Egomania Magazine, Knockabout Comics, hardcover, 160 pages, 2006, ISBN 0-86166-153-2) previously released as:
  - The Birth Caul (1999), Eddie Campbell Comics; performance art piece adapted for comics by Eddie Campbell
  - Snakes and Ladders (2001), Eddie Campbell Comics; performance art piece adapted for comics by Eddie Campbell

== See also ==
- List of published material by Alan Moore
