= Graham Bleathman =

British illustrator

- Born: 1959 (age 66–67); Salisbury, Wiltshire, England
- Spouse: Katie Runciman (m. 1994)

Graham Bleathman (born 1959) is a Bristol-based artist who draws cutaways and cross-sections for Haynes Manuals and other publishers. Subjects of his published work include the TV series Thunderbirds and Wallace & Gromit.

Bleathman has also produced drawings for calendars, board games, lunchboxes, trading cards, jigsaw puzzles, video sleeves, and greetings cards.

Before going freelance, Bleathman worked as an in-house illustrator for the Salisbury Journal. He has painted front covers for The People's Friend under the pseudonym "J. Campbell Kerr".
