= Bill Koeb =

American painter

Bill Koeb is an American painter, illustrator, and sequential artist whose work includes illustrations for Washington City Paper, The Village Voice, and Bill Graham Presents. His paintings have been exhibited in shows in New York, San Francisco, and Los Angeles. He has illustrated stories for the Marvel Comics' series Clive Barker's Hellraiser, the Vertigo miniseries Faultlines and Alan Moore's song, "Hair of the Snake That Bit Me". He created the artwork for the character Sarah in the film The Crow: City of Angels (1996).

== Biography ==
One of four children, Bill Koeb grew up in California, where he attended elementary school in San Jose and high school in Livermore. From 1985 to 1988, he attended the Academy of Art College in San Francisco, majored in Illustration and studied under Barron Storey whom he assisted on Barron's rainforest mural for the American Museum of Natural History. Koeb spent 17 years in San Francisco as a freelance illustrator before moving to Chapel Hill, North Carolina, where he resides as of 2002.

He did the first of several painted stories and covers for the horror fiction anthology Clive Barker's Hellraiser, from Marvel Comics' Epic Comics imprint, that same year, beginning with the 17-page story "The Pleasures of Deception", by Philip Nutman, in issue #2 (no date; 1990). In addition to the series, Koeb painted the 18-page story "For My Son", written by Frank Lovece, for Clive Barker's Hellraiser Summer Special #1 (1992). That story appears in Checker Publishing's Clive Barker's Hellraiser: Collected Best, Volume 1 (ISBN 0-9710249-2-8), though with the last page inexplicably missing; the complete story appears in an authorized, free online version from web publisher Wowio.

Other comics work includes pencil-and-ink art for writer Lee Marrs' six-issue miniseries Faultlines (May-Oct. 1997), published by DC Comics' Vertigo imprint; and the cover and writer Alan Moore's eight-page story "The Hair of the Snake That Bit Me" in Caliber Press' Negative Burn #17 (1995), reprinted in the 1998 Caliber one-shot Alan Moore's Songbook. Additionally, Koeb painted the cover and the 28-page story of Marvel/Epic's Interface #7 (Nov. 1990); drew the parody comic Aesop's Desecrated Morals #1 (Rip Off Press, 1993); and inked Tom Sutton on DC Comics' The Hacker Files #11-12 (June–July 1993)

From 1998 to 2001 he created over 40 illustrations for a Fireman's Fund national print campaign. In late 2001, with the birth of his son Gabriel, and with fewer jobs coming in as the result of a downturn in the economy, Koeb focused on painting and earned a living primarily from teaching Photoshop and illustration classes at The Academy of Art, San Francisco. In late 2006, he joined Goodwill Community Foundation, doing artwork for interactive lessons for a functional literacy program.

In 2003, Koeb had his first one-man show at Elon College, Elon, NC, and in 2009, his second solo show at Flanders 311 in Raleigh, NC. He currently lives in Chapel Hill, North Carolina, with his wife and son and is working on paintings and a children's book. He will be exhibiting monotypes at his solo show, "Eminence Front" at Gallery AD in November 2015.

== Bibliography ==
- ReMemory The Art of Bill Koeb (Cartouche Press/Steve Jackson Games, 2003) ISBN 1-55634-631-X; ISBN 978-1-55634-631-6
