= Unearthing =

Book by Alan Moore

- Author: Alan Moore; Mitch Jenkins; Crook&Flail
- Language: English
- Publisher: Lex Records
- Publication date: August 2010
- Publication place: United Kingdom
- Media type: Audiobook

Unearthing is an essay written by Alan Moore and originally published in Iain Sinclair's London: City of Disappearances in 2006. It has subsequently been developed into a photographic book in collaboration with Mitch Jenkins and a spoken word piece in collaboration with Crook&Flail. The spoken word version is 2:01:07 in length and was released by Lex Records.

Unearthing follows the life of Alan Moore's friend and colleague Steve Moore. In an interview with The Quietus in 2010, Alan Moore described the work:

...more of a human excavation than the excavation of a place, but because Steve Moore has lived his entire life in one house on top of Shooter's Hill and he currently sleeps no more than four paces from the spot where he was born, it does become a work of psychogeography as well.

== Book with Mitch Jenkins ==
In November 2007, photographer Mitch Jenkins began work on photographic illustration of Unearthing. The illustrated work was released through comic book publisher Top Shelf Productions in 2012, in a softcover edition as well as a deluxe, oversized, limited edition hardcover.

A small number of Mitch Jenkins' images from the Unearthing book are used in the packaging for the Unearthing audio release.

== Audiobook with Crook&Flail ==
In September 2008, work began on a spoken word version of Unearthing narrated by Alan Moore.

Mitch Jenkins was central in the development of Unearthing as a spoken word piece, first recording Alan Moore's narration and then working with Lex Records to develop the score for the project.

The score was written by Crook&Flail, a production duo consisting of Andrew Broder of Fog and Adam Drucker aka Doseone. They worked with several other musicians on the score, including Mike Patton, Stuart Braithwaite, Zach Hill, Justin Broadrick, George Cartwright, Matt Darling and Paul Metzger. In an interview with Pitchfork Media in August 2009, Adam Drucker described the process of collaborating with Alan Moore, Mitch Jenkins and Andrew Broder:

We get to score Unearthing, so it's now become this big, organic sort of collaboration between the four of us. We basically did two hours of reading when we first got it, and it's extremely dense. I remember the first time I read it... I didn't know what to do with myself. But as we listened to it, it's full of recurring themes, and all this recurring writing breaks and reconstructs its phrasings over and over again throughout. So we kinda found those motifs, brought them all in and out, and then made holes in it, where we made things recur and then patched the holes...

In April 2010, it was announced that Unearthing would be available as a box set release from Lex Records.

== Live performances with Crook&Flail ==
Alan Moore has performed two live readings of Unearthing accompanied by Crook&Flail. The sold out performances took place at The Old Vic Tunnels under London Waterloo station on 29 and 30 July 2010. The live reading and performance of the score took place in front of a backdrop of Mitch Jenkins' images.

== Reviews ==
- NME (8 July 2010)
- The A.V. Club A
- URB
