= The League of Extraordinary Gentlemen, Volume IV: The Tempest =

Graphic novel

Publication information
- Publisher: Top Shelf Productions (US); Knockabout Comics (UK)
- Format: Limited series
- Genre: Superhero
- Publication date: 2018 – 2019
- Main character(s): Mina Murray; Orlando

Creative team
- Written by: Alan Moore
- Artist: Kevin O'Neill
- Letterer: Todd Klein
- Colorist: Ben Dimagmaliw

The League of Extraordinary Gentlemen, Volume IV: The Tempest is the final volume in The League of Extraordinary Gentlemen series, written by Alan Moore and illustrated by Kevin O'Neill, co-published by Top Shelf Productions and Knockabout Comics in the US and UK.

== Plot ==
In Africa, Mina Murray and Orlando bring Emma Night to the fire of youth, where she is made young again and immortal. Since Night has abandoned MI5 and stolen several items, including the Black Dossier, the three are now fugitives. They decide to seek refuge with Jack Nemo, great-grandson of the original Captain Nemo, on Lincoln Island.

Unknown to the women, Night is replaced as M by the elderly Jimmy Bond, who after torturing three of Night's old friends, who commit suicide, tracks them to the pool. After bathing in it, Bond destroys it with a nuclear bomb. He then does research on the League's history and learns, among other things, about the Blazing World, which he also nukes. The women and Jack learn of this from an AI the latter owns, and while Mina and Jack head for the Blazing World, Emma and Orlando head to London to kill Bond.

Meanwhile, Satin Astro, former member of superhero team the Seven Stars, arrives from the year 2996 to prevent a global catastrophe that results in a ruthless dictatorship ruling Earth from Mars. She tries to get her old team back together, but since most are either dead or retired, only the Martian telepath Marsman joins her. The two go to their team's old headquarters in London, also the League's former HQ, where they meet Emma and Orlando. Another telepath working with former member Captain Universe reveals to Marsman that member Vull the Invisible was Mina, while Universe and Electrogirl eventually decide to rejoin. Though the attempts to kill Bond fail, he is presumed dead when a massive explosion obliterates MI5.

Meanwhile, Mina and Jack arrive at the Blazing World, which is slowly being rebuilt, with all its inhabitants restored thanks to Prospero, who manages to reverse the nuclear blast to the instant it detonates, and then sends it to MI5 headquarters. After watching a play detailing the League's founding with disturbing implications, the two meet former English queen the half-Faerie Gloriana, who commissioned the League's founding. The two reveal that everything the League has done over the centuries have been part of a plot by them to eventually unleash magical beings on the human world in revenge for driving them underground. Unable to stop them, the two flee in what Mina thinks is the Nautilus.

With the world being slowly overtaken by magical beings, the very catastrophe Satin tried to stop, the League and its allies choose to flee into space aboard the true Nautilus, a spaceship. Though they intend to survive off the lunar colonies, this plan is ruined when they find the Moon, Venus, and Mars slowly being conquered by Amazon forces who Mina admits she previously provided a means of breeding with James Moriarty's corpse, possibly another part of Prospero's plan.

The Nautilus passes through the asteroid belt to colonize parts unknown. During Captain Universe and Electrogirl's wedding, Emma encounters a still-alive Bond, who she incapacitates and kills. Everyone eventually settles elsewhere, Universe manages to create a new fire of youth, and a century later, Mina shares a dance with a cloned Edward Hyde.
