= The Mindscape of Alan Moore =

- Directed by: DeZ Vylenz
- Written by: DeZ Vylenz
- Produced by: DeZ Vylenz
- Starring: Alan Moore
- Music by: Drew Richards
- Distributed by: Shadowsnake Films
- Release date: October 24, 2003 (San Francisco World Film Festival)
- Running time: 78 minutes
- Language: English

The Mindscape of Alan Moore is a 2003 documentary film that chronicles the life and work of Alan Moore, author of several acclaimed graphic novels, including From Hell, Watchmen, and V for Vendetta.

The Mindscape of Alan Moore is Shadowsnake's first completed feature project, part One of the Shamanautical / 5 Elements series. It is the directorial debut of Dez Vylenz. It is the only feature film production on which Alan Moore has collaborated, with permission to use his work.

This feature was shot on film, in colour, and is 78 minutes in length.

== Synopsis ==
Alan Moore presents the story of his development as an artist, starting with his childhood and working through to his comics career and impact on that medium, and his emerging interest in magic.

The film features the first film adaptations of scenes from Moore's acclaimed series V for Vendetta and Watchmen, shot in early 2002. Another key scene features a direct reference to the character of John Constantine from the comic book Hellblazer. The film also contains a brief look into Lost Girls, which would not be officially released until years later.

== Release ==
The film was showcased at the San Francisco World Film Festival and Marketplace 2003 (23–25 October 2003), where it received a Special Recognition Award for creative achievement in documentary filmmaking.

== DVD ==
The DVD was released by Shadowsnake Films in April 2008 and in September of the same year Disinfo released it in the United States. It is made up of two discs, the first containing the main 80-minute interview and the second includes interviews with some of his major collaborators like Dave Gibbons, David Lloyd, Melinda Gebbie, as well as Paul Gravett.

== Music ==
The original music score was composed by Drew Richards, with additional original work from RZA. The soundtrack also features music by Bill Laswell & Alan Douglas, Lustmord and Spectre.
