= Knockabout Comics =

UK comics publisher and distributor

- Predecessor: Hassle Free Press
- Founded: 1975
- Founder: Tony Bennett; Carol Bennett
- Country of origin: United Kingdom
- Headquarters location: London
- Distribution: Turnaround Publisher Services
- Publication types: Comics
- Fiction genres: Underground comix
- Owner(s): Toskanex Limited
- Official website: www.knockabout.com

Knockabout Comics is a UK publisher and distributor of underground and alternative books and comics. They have a long-standing relationship with underground comix pioneer Gilbert Shelton.

== History ==
The company was founded in 1975 by Tony and Carol Bennett as Hassle Free Press, a U.K. publisher of underground titles like Gilbert Shelton's The Fabulous Furry Freak Brothers and Fat Freddy's Cat, as well as work by British creators such as Hunt Emerson and Bryan Talbot. Around 1978 or 1979 the company changed its name to Knockabout Comics. It has published works by Robert Crumb (My Troubles With Women, R. Crumb Draws the Blues, R. Crumb's America). In the 1980s 13 issues of the eponymous Knockabout anthology were produced.

Graphic designer and cartoonist Rian Hughes was the company's chief designer from 1985 to 1992.

Knockabout has frequently suffered from prosecutions from U.K. customs, who have seized work by creators such as Crumb and Melinda Gebbie, claiming it to be obscene or promoting drug use.

The company currently has a diverse catalogue of titles and, with Top Shelf Productions has co-published The League of Extraordinary Gentlemen, Volume III: Century and The League of Extraordinary Gentlemen, Volume IV: The Tempest, both by Alan Moore and Kevin O'Neill. (The previous installments were published by Wildstorm, Vertigo, and America's Best Comics, all of which are imprints of DC Comics.)

Since the late 1990s, when Rip Off Press essentially stopped publishing comics, Knockabout has become the main English-language publisher for Gilbert Shelton, including such titles as The Fabulous Furry Freak Brothers, Wonder Wart-Hog, Fat Freddy's Cat, and Not Quite Dead.

== Titles (selected) ==
=== Original titles ===
- A Guide to British Psilocybin Mushrooms by Richard Cooper (1979)
- Knockabout Comics (13 issues, 1980–1988)
- Knockabout Trial Special (1984)
- Outrageous Tales from the Old Testament (1987) – by Neil Gaiman, Alan Moore, Dave McKean, Hunt Emerson, et al.
- Hard to Swallow (1988) – John Dowie & Hunt Emerson
- Seven Deadly Sins (1989) – anthology featuring Hunt Emerson, Lew Stringer, Alan Moore, Neil Gaiman, Bryan Talbot, Dave Gibbons, Davy Francis, et al.
- Firkin (7 issues, 1989–1991) – by Hunt Emerson and Tom Motley
- Not Quite Dead (6 issues, 1993–2010) – by Gilbert Shelton and Pic; originally co-published with Rip Off Press
- A Disease of Language (2005) – adapted by Eddie Campbell, from Alan Moore's "The Birth Caul" and "Snakes and Ladders" with interview from Egomania Magazine, hardcover, 160 pages, ISBN 0-86166-153-2
- The League of Extraordinary Gentlemen, Volume III (2009–2012) – by Alan Moore and Kevin O'Neill; co-published with Top Shelf Productions
- Jerusalem (2016) – novel by Alan Moore
- The League of Extraordinary Gentlemen, Volume IV: The Tempest (2018–2019) – by Alan Moore and Kevin O'Neill; co-published with Top Shelf Productions

=== Reprints and collections ===
- The Fabulous Furry Freak Brothers (9 issues, 1976–1992)
- Fresca Zizis (1985) – Melinda Gebbie
- Opium (1986) – Daniel Torres
- Fat Freddy's Cat (7 issues, 1988)
- My Troubles With Women (1990) – by Robert Crumb
- R. Crumb Draws the Blues (1992)
- R. Crumb's America (1994)
- From Hell (2000) – by Alan Moore and Eddie Campbell, trade paperback
- Bolland Strips! (2005) – by Brian Bolland ISBN 978-0-86166-150-3
- Yesterday's Tomorrows: Rian Hughes Collected Comics (2007) – by Rian Hughes, 256 pages, ISBN 0-86166-154-0
- The Bojeffries Saga (co-published with Top Shelf Productions, Feb. 2013) ISBN 978-1-60309-063-6
