= Redfox (comics) =

British fantasy comic

- Cover of The Book of Redfox (Dec. 1986) by Brian Bolland

Publication information
- Publisher: Harrier Comics; Valkyrie Press
- Schedule: Bi-monthly
- Format: Ongoing series
- Genre: Fantasy
- Publication date: January 1986 – June 1989
- No. of issues: 20
- Main character(s): Redfox

Creative team
- Created by: Fox
- Written by: Fox (issues #1-20); Mike Lewis (issues #1-4); Chris Bell (issues #6-19)
- Penciller(s): Fox
- Inker(s): Fox (issues #1-5); Dave Harwood (issues #6-10, issue #16); Tony O'Donnell (issues #11-15); Vince Danks (issues #18–20)
- Letterer(s): Melvyn James (issue #1); Jack McArdle (issues #3-15)

Collected editions
- The Book of Redfox!: ISBN 1-870217-00-4
- Redfox Book II: The Demon Queen: ISBN 1-870217-01-2

Redfox is a British fantasy comic published in the late 1980s, created and penciled by Fox. The comic won the 1987 Eagle Award for Best New British Comic of 1986, and was nominated for eight Eagle Awards in total.

== Publication history ==
Redfox herself first appeared in the fanzine DragonLords in the early 1980s. Fox, a house artist at DragonLords, used the strip to comment on fantasy games-barbarian fashion, and later expanded his heroine's story into a three-issue Redfox fanzine.

The fanzine stories were revised and redrawn to form the early issues of Harrier Comics' bimonthly US-format black-and-white comic, published from January 1986 to July 1987. Mike Lewis, one of the co-creators of DragonLords, provided additional writing for the early stories. An eight-page "origin of sorts", written by Harrier publisher Martin Lock and drawn by Fox, was published in the Harrier Comics title Swiftsure #9 (July 1986).

Writer Chris Bell joined the creative team with issue #6 (November 1986), usually co-scripting the story over Fox's plots. Bell recounts how this happened:

The last six pages of issue #6 were written in about three hours, when Fox had visited Chris Bell in Bristol for a weekend and stayed for three weeks and needed a script in a hurry to take back up to Nottingham with him. Chris had never written for comics before; Fox presented her with the image at the top of page 22, the phrase "a collection of enchanted cutlery", and a deadline of "yesterday". So she sat in her kitchen and wrote it. To her astonishment, he accepted it, and asked her to do the next issue as well, because the script for that had been abandoned half-finished. This was the beginning of the partnership which lasted until the end of the comic, two and a half years later.

Bell established Valkyrie Press as a stand-alone publisher in the fall of 1987, solely to continue publishing Redfox with issue #11. Valkyrie later took on publishing Bryan Talbot's comic The Adventures of Luther Arkwright as well. After a further ten issues, publication ceased with issue #20 (June 1989).

Various creators from British comics of the time occasionally helped out with the title: for example, Redfox #7 (January 1987) had a specially painted cover by John Bolton. Bryan Talbot contributed the cover art for issue #9, and Neil Gaiman wrote part of the final issue, when Chris Bell was distracted by the imminent arrival of her baby.

== Overview ==
=== The Demon Queen Saga ===
Issues #5-10 (Sept. 1986 – July 1987) of Redfox comprised a story arc officially titled "The Demon Queen Saga", which was a turning point in more than one way. The series, which began as a comedy set in a fantasy world, suddenly became driven by angst and tragedy. This was around the time when comics such as Watchmen were popularizing treatment of more serious and adult themes.

The story itself was an obvious clone of "The Dark Phoenix Saga" (published by Marvel Comics in its X-Men title in 1980). Both "The Demon Queen Saga" and "The Dark Phoenix Saga" share the following plot points:

1. Character A gains a new source of power (Zebethyial's ring in Redfox, the Phoenix Force in X-Men), which turns her from one of the weakest members of the cast to one of the most powerful. (Redfox #1/X-Men #101)
2. Character A has no notion of the nature of this new power, but quickly accepts it nonetheless. (Redfox #1/X-Men #101)
3. Character A becomes more vicious and unscrupulous, prompting her friends to become concerned. (Redfox #5-6/X-Men #129-132)
4. A traumatic event causes Character A to lose control of herself to the source of her new power and become a god-like evil being. (Redfox #6/X-Men #134)
5. With her power increased to the level of a god, Character A kills a vast number of innocent people. (Redfox #6/X-Men #135)
6. In response, authorities from multiple worlds mobilize to kill Character A. (Redfox #9/X-Men #136)
7. Character A's friends fight to free her of the dark influence, but are easily overpowered. Character A renders them all immobile and begins tormenting them. (Redfox #9-10/X-Men #135-6)
8. A friend of Character A, who Character A overlooked, uses psychic abilities to free Character A from the force controlling her. (Redfox #10/X-Men #136)
9. In her moment of lucidity, Character A commits suicide in order to prevent herself from killing any more people. (Redfox #10/X-Men #137)

Fox was unashamed to admit that "The Demon Queen Saga" was almost entirely derived from the X-Men story arc. Besides giving the story an obviously similar title, when a reader wrote about issue #5, "Is this the start of some 'Dark Redfox' kind of saga?", Fox teasingly replied that there was little resemblance because Dark Phoenix had a "weaker sense of humor".

Ironically, not long afterward, in Alpha Flight #57 (April 1988), Marvel created a thinly disguised version of the Demon Queen under the name of the Dreamqueen.

== Major characters ==
Redfox (aka "Redfox the Barbarian")

Prettier than Conan, Funnier than Elric, Shorter than Red Sonja, Redfox — Another kind of heroine — Book of Redfox, cover quote

Barmaid turned adventurer, Redfox sets out to steal the treasures of the Temple of Pthud, only to discover that crocodile traps are the least of her problems. World-renowned for being short, blonde, and having lousy dress sense.

Estaque

He's one of these hocus-pocus merchants... you must know the type. Yeah, that's right, always gushing on about manipulation of the cosmos, and their dedication to the science of magic for the benefit of mankind. — Ratty

Estaque is an old wizard with a long beard who lives in a tower in the middle of nowhere, conducting weird experiments and summoning strange creatures. Bumbling and incompetent, he still puts up a good fight when he has to.

Griff

But then the people who call themselves my friends so often don't understand me at all. Take that wretched procession, for example. I can't think where ever they got the idea that I like all that dancing in the streets. — Griff

Griff is the creator god of the Redfox universe. He bears a striking resemblance to Neil Gaiman, and is most likely to be found picnicking amongst his creations with a Fortnum and Mason hamper.

Lyssa The Axe

By the way, I'm known as Lyssa the Axe. Slayer of men. Vanquisher of cities. Mercenary extraordinaire! And I turn out a mean curry too. — Lyssa

Lyssa was born Lady Alicia Y Maris D'Almeric, but ran away from home rather than live the dull life of a noble. A disappointed idealist who's turned to drink, her dislike of killing could be considered a disadvantage in her chosen career as a mercenary.

Shoquastikan (aka "Ratty")

It ain't easy you know, going through life knowing that you're nothing more than a mistake. One chemical too many in the test-tube, and out I popped. — Ratty

Ratty is a sentient rat, the result of one of Estaque's numerous failed experiments. He's just here for the beer, though he saves the world for a hobby.

Trog

You want the throne room. Let's see, turn left at the snake pit, straight down the hall of knives, turn right at the croc pool, and it's the second door on your left..... or was it left at the croc pool? — Trog

Trog is the caretaker in the Temple of Pthud. Trog clears up bodies, puts slime on the walls, that kind of thing. It's a highly responsible job.

Whitefox (aka "Snowy")

Whitefox is one of Estaque's more successful projects, the result of an attempt to clone Redfox. He produced a near-perfect copy, other than her extreme magical abilities, poker skills, albino skin and respectable dress sense.

== Collected editions ==
The series has been collected into trade paperbacks:

- The Book of Redfox!, Harrier Comics/Valkyrie Press, Dec. 1986 ISBN 1-870217-00-4 (collects issues #1–4 and the short "Fair Exchange" by Martin Lock, Fox, and Carl Cropley, from Swiftsure and Conqueror #9, July 1986)
- Redfox Book II: The Demon Queen, Harrier Comics/Valkyrie Press, Dec. 1988, ISBN 1-870217-01-2 (collects issues #5–8)
