= DragonLords =

British fanzine

- Cover of DragonLords issue #13 (1981), featuring artwork by Peter Martin.
- Frequency: semi-annual
- Publisher: Marc Gascoigne, Mike Lewis, and Ian Marsh
- First issue: c. 1978
- Final issue Number: 1985; 22
- Country: United Kingdom
- Based in: London
- Language: English

DragonLords, subtitled "Yet Another Fantasy & Sci-Fi Roleplaying Magazine", is a British role-playing game fanzine from the late 1970s and early 1980s. Self-published originally by Marc Gascoigne, Mike Lewis, and Ian Marsh, DragonLords produced 22 issues from c. 1978 to 1985.

Originally solely focused on Dungeons & Dragons, the fanzine came to include reviews, articles about computer games, and a regular column about the strategic board game Diplomacy.

DragonLords was a "well-regarded fanzine" that helped two of the three editors attain editorial positions with the British manufacturer of miniature wargames, Games Workshop.

== Publication history ==
School friends Gascoigne, Lewis, and Marsh played the newly published role-playing game Dungeons & Dragons in the mid-1970s. Soon afterward, the three friends started writing, editing and self-publishing DragonLords.

Marsh, Lewis, and Gascoigne continued to publish DragonLords after they entered university in 1978. Marsh even produced an issue in the midst of final exams, saying later, "The magazine seemed more important."

Gascoigne withdrew from the fanzine in 1983, leaving Marsh and Lewis to continue publication.

Once Marsh graduated from university and joined the editorial staff of White Dwarf, he found he had less time to work on the fanzine, and decided to bring it to a close with issue #22 (1985).

== Contents ==
A DragonLords article titled "The Ecology of the Piercer," by Chris Elliot and Richard Edwards, explained the habits of the piercer, a D&D monster, as if being told in a lecture given by a wizard. The article was picked up in whole and reprinted by industry giant Dragon in issue #72 (April 1983). The article proved so popular that more than 150 "The Ecology of..." articles appeared in subsequent issues of Dragon.

=== Redfox ===
The Redfox comic originated in the pages of DragonLords, first as a three-panel strip featuring a barmaid turned warrior that was inked by an artist working under the pseudonym "Fox". The strip was created as readers debated whether the fanzine should show scantily-clad women on its cover. Redfox proved popular enough that it continued as a regular feature. After Dragonlords folded, Fox self-published Redfox, with writing from former DragonLords editor Mike Lewis. The comic went on to win an Eagle Award for "Favourite New Comic (UK)" in 1987, and led to the creation of Valkyrie Press.

== Critical reception ==
At the Games Day '81 convention in London, DragonLords was voted second place as "Best Games Fanzine".

In Issue 18 of Abyss, Dave Nalle was impressed, writing, "This is one of the best fanzines I've seen in quite a while ... highly satirical and very interesting, though many references are to obscure local events." Nalle concluded, "On the whole, this is a fanzine I would recommend to everyone who has a good sense of humor and wants to get a lighter insight into British FRPing, along with good, mature ideas and variants." Two years later, when Nalle heard the magazine had ceased publication, he wrote, "I regret the departure of DL as it was a unique 'zine, and did some things which I wished we could do with more success in Abyss."

Dungeons & Dragons co-creator Gary Gygax praised DragonLords in the August 1982 edition of Dragon (Issue #63), writing that "the digest-size magazine is filled with material of a fairly high value, and is surprisingly even, too." Gygax lauded DragonLords for "its obvious attempt to make meaningful contributions to adventure gaming." He concluded that "DragonLords is a well done amateur effort which seems bent on improving itself and the hobby."

In the inaugural issue of Imagine (April 1983), Don Turnbull reviewed DragonLords #14, asking "where would we be without it?" Although he noted the recent departure of Gascoigne, Turnbull thought the issue "looks good, has fine artwork in places and always does well in convention polls."

== Reviews ==
- Imagine #5
- Imagine #7
- Imagine #8
- Imagine #10
- Imagine #13
- Imagine #16
- Imagine #20
