= Harrier Comics =

British comic book publisher

Harrier Publishing
- Founded: 1984
- Founder: Martin Lock
- Defunct: 1989
- Country of origin: United Kingdom
- Headquarters location: Northwood, Middlesex
- Key people: Martin Lock; Phil Elliott; Stephen Baskerville
- Publication types: Comic books
- Fiction genres: Science fiction, adventure, fantasy, humor, alternative
- Imprints: New Wave

Harrier Comics (officially known as Harrier Publishing) was a British comic book publisher active in the mid-to-late 1980s. Harrier was notable for putting out black-and-white comics in a mold more similar to American comics than to typical British fare.

The original line of Harrier titles were in the science fiction, adventure, and fantasy genres; as the company moved forward it focused more on alternative comics. Harrier's alternative imprint, New Wave, featured a number of notable creators, including Eddie Campbell, Phil Elliott, Glenn Dakin, Paul Grist, Ed Hillyer, Rian Hughes, Trevs Phoenix, and Warren Pleece. A number of top UK comics professional gave their support to Harrier by contributing covers and introductions to various Harrier titles.

Print runs for Harrier's titles typically ran in the 10,000 range, with most of the issues being distributed in the United States. During its short existence, Harrier published more than 120 issues of over 30 titles.

== History ==
Harrier was founded in 1984 by Martin Lock, up to that point a long-time comics fanzine publisher known for BEM and Fantasy Advertiser. The success of Kevin Eastman and Peter Laird's Teenage Mutant Ninja Turtles led to a short-lived explosion of black-and-white independent comics in the United States in the mid-1980s. The U.K. publisher Harrier's titles followed the same mold (unlike most British comics publishers, who favored the comic magazine format). Harrier's aesthetic was also inspired in some ways by the bold design of the UK's Escape magazine. As evidenced by the company logo, Harrier's name was an homage to the harrier bird of prey, some varieties of which are native to the U.K.

Harrier's first title was the space-fantasy series Conqueror, with the first issue being dated August 1984. The series traced its roots back to 1979, when writer Lock and artist Dave Harwood created the first stories for BEM. Conqueror eventually ran for nine issues and spawned a number of spin-offs and one-shots, published throughout 1984 and 1985. The 1987 Conqueror Special served as an end-cap to the series.

1985 saw the first volume of Swiftsure, also written by Lock, which ran for six issues and was followed by a second volume of four issues in 1987.

In 1986, Harrier released the showcase anthology Avalon, which ran 14 issues; and Redfox, which ran ten issues before being picked up in 1987 by Valkyrie Press. (Valkyrie Press begin in 1986 as an imprint of Harrier, established to collect the first four issues of Redfox, which had been published by Harrier, in a trade paperback.) Second City and Shock Therapy also debuted in 1986. That same year, Harrier published one issue of Lew Stringer's Brickman (a parody of Batman), which featured pages drawn by notable British creators Dave Gibbons, Mike Collins, Mark Farmer, and Kevin O'Neill, and an introduction written by Alan Moore.

1987 was Harrier's most active year, as it debuted the humor series !Gag!, Barbarienne (written by Lock), Eddie Campbell's Deadface, Grun, Nightbird, and Swiftsure vol. 2; as well as the one-shots By The Time I Get To Wagga Wagga (also by Campbell), Captain Oblivion, the Conqueror Special, Deathwatch, Phil Elliott's More Tales From Gimbley, and Watchcats. That year Harrier also debuted its New Wave imprint — the first title published under it being Glenn Dakin and Steve Way's Paris the Man of Plaster, which ran for six issues. Other alternative-flavored titles, like Deadface and the !Gag! anthology, were soon folded into the New Wave imprint. The Harrier title Redfox won the 1987 Eagle Award for Favourite New Title.

In 1988, Harrier released another batch of new titles—including Harrier Preview, Kalgan the Golden, Moon Fighting, Nick Hazard, Sunrise and Vignette Comics — none of which lasted for more than two issues. That year, Harrier's New Wave imprint released the four-issue Sinister Romance and Eddie Campbell's Ace and Bacchus.

By the spring of 1989, however, low sales forced Harrier to shut down.

== Notable creators associated with Harrier ==
Harrier first published Eddie Campbell's long-running character Bacchus, first in Deadface and then in a self-titled comic. The New Wave imprint featured Campbell, as well as Glenn Dakin's work, in Paris, The Man Of Plaster (with Steve Way) and the anthology !Gag!. Dakin (with Woodrow Phoenix) also co-edited, wrote, and drew the New Wave humor title Sinister Romance. Long-time British comics creator Phil Elliott edited !Gag!. Harrier also published two collections of Elliott's A Tale from Gimbley stories, as well as Elliott and Paul Duncan's four-issue Second City title.

Two of three completed prologues for an unfinished story by Grant Morrison and Tony O'Donnell titled Abraxas were published as back-up stories in Harrier's Sunrise #1-2 before its cancellation. They were printed in black and white although the original art was in color.

== Titles published ==
=== Ongoing series ===
- Avalon (Oct. 1986–Feb. 1988), #1–14
- Barbarienne (March 1987–Nov. 1988), #1–8
- Conqueror (Aug. 1984–Dec. 1985), #1–9
- Conqueror Universe (1985), #1–2
- Cuirass (1988), #1–4
- Grun (June 1987–Dec. 1987), #1–4
- Nightbird (1987), #1–2
- Redfox (Jan. 1986-July 1987), #1–10 (series picked up by Valkyrie Press)
  - The Book of Redfox (Dec. 1986) ISBN 1-870217-00-4 — trade paperback collecting issues #1–4 and the "origin story" from Swiftsure and Conqueror #9; co-branded with Valkyrie Press
  - Redfox Book II: The Demon Queen (Dec. 1988) ISBN 1-870217-01-2 — trade paperback collecting issues #5–8; co-published with Valkyrie Press
- Second City (Nov. 1986-Apr. 1987), #1–4
- Shock Therapy (Dec. 1986-Aug. 1987), #1–6
- Sunrise (Feb. 1987–May 1987), #1–2
- Swiftsure
  - Swiftsure vol. 1 (May 1985–Jan. 1986), #1–6
  - Swiftsure and Conqueror (Mar. 1986-May 1987), #7–14
  - Swiftsure vol. 2 (July 1987-Jan. 1988), #15–18

=== One-shots ===
- Brickman (1986) — by Lew Stringer, Dave Gibbons, Mike Collins, Mark Farmer, and Kevin O'Neill
- By The Time I Get To Wagga Wagga (1987) — Eddie Campbell
- Captain Oblivion (1987)
- Conqueror Special (1987)
- Conqueror Special Preview (1984)
- Deathwatch (1987) — by Art Wetherell
- Harrier Preview (1988)
- Kalgan the Golden (1988)
- Moon Fighting (1988)
- More Tales From Gimbley (Feb. 1988) — Phil Elliott; sequel to Some Tales from Gimbley
- Nick Hazard (1988) — based on John Russell Fearn's "Lords of 9016" (Thrilling Wonder Stories, April 1938)
- Some Tales From Gimbley (June 1987) — Phil Elliott
- Vignette Comics (1988)
- Watchcats (1987)

=== New Wave imprint ===
- Ace (1 issue, 1988) — Eddie Campbell
- Bacchus (2 issues, Mar. 1988–Aug. 1988) — Eddie Campbell
- Deadface (8 issues [final 3 with New Wave], Apr. 1987-Oct. 1988 — Eddie Campbell
- !Gag! (7 issues [final 4 with New Wave], Jan. 1987-Spring 1989) — edited by Phil Elliott; contributors included John Bagnall, Eddie Campbell, Glenn Dakin, Elliott, Paul Grist, Ed Hillyer, Rian Hughes, Trevs Phoenix, and Steve Way
- Paris the Man of Plaster (6 issues, May 1987–Sept. 1988) — Glenn Dakin and Steve Way
- Sinister Romance (4 issues, July 1988–June 1989) — satirical romance comics by Glenn Dakin, Trevs Phoenix, and Warren Pleece
