= Valkyrie Press =

British publisher of comics, 1987–1989

- Parent company: Luckyglobe Limited
- Status: defunct (1989)
- Founded: 1987
- Founder: Chris Bell
- Country of origin: United Kingdom
- Headquarters location: Bristol
- Key people: Fox, Harry Payne
- Publication types: Comic books
- Fiction genres: Adventure, fantasy

Valkyrie Press was a British publisher of comics that operated from 1987 to 1989. It published Fox's Redfox, and Bryan Talbot's The Adventures of Luther Arkwright, both of which won Eagle Awards. Valkyrie Press was owned by Redfox co-writer Chris Bell and jointly operated by Bell and Redfox artist Fox.

== History ==
Valkyrie Press begin in 1986 as an imprint of Harrier Comics, established to collect the first four issues of Redfox (which had been published by Harrier) in a trade paperback.

Redfox co-writer Chris Bell launched Valkyrie as a standalone publisher in 1987, initially solely to continue publishing Redfox. As Bell described it, "the board of Valkyrie Press, which is [a] ... limited company, consists of five people: one solicitor...; one accountant...; one company secretary and transport manager...; one Chairman [Fox]...; and me."

Redfox won the 1987 Eagle Award for Favourite New Comic (reflecting its run with Harrier).

The company then took on The Adventures of Luther Arkwright, publishing nine issues — the first six of which were reprinted from Near Myths #1-5 (Galaxy Media, 1978–1980) & pssst! #2-10 (Never–Artpool, 1982) with extra pages; and the last three with all-new material; followed, at readers' request, by a tenth issue, entitled ARKeology, containing articles about the history and production of the comic and some extended back story and character information. During this period, Valkyrie also published the trade paperback The Adventures of Luther Arkwright Book 2: Transfiguration, the money for printing of which was put up by Serge Boissevain, publisher of the cancelled pssst! anthology.

Valkyrie's The Adventures of Luther Arkwright won four 1988 Eagle Awards — for Favourite Character (UK), Favourite New Comic (UK), and Favourite Comic Cover (UK) (for The Adventures of Luther Arkwright #1); with Talbot winning the Eagle for Favourite Artist (UK).

Valkyrie's titles were printed by Wiltshire Ltd. of Bristol, and were distributed by Titan Distributors.

In 1989, Bell announced her retirement from publishing as she wanted to focus on raising a family. After publishing all nine issues of The Adventures of Luther Arkwright and the last ten issues of Redfox (as well as co-publishing two Redfox trade paperbacks and the Luther Arkwright TPB), Valkyrie Press ended its publishing operations.

== Titles published ==
- The Adventures of Luther Arkwright (9 issues, Oct. 1987–Feb. 1989) plus one issue of ARKeology in early 1989
  - The Adventures of Luther Arkwright Book 2: Transfiguration (Nov. 1987), ISBN 978-1870923002 — introduction by Alan Moore
- Redfox (10 issues [issues #11–20], Sept. 1987–June 1989) — numbering continued from Harrier Comics series
  - The Book of Redfox (Dec. 1986), co-published with Harrier Comics, ISBN 1-870217-00-4 — collects Harrier issues #1–4 as well as the story "Fair Exchange," by Martin Lock, Fox, and Carl Cropley, from Swiftsure and Conqueror #9 (Harrier Comics, July 1986)
  - Redfox Book II: The Demon Queen (Dec. 1988), co-published with Harrier Comics, ISBN 1-870217-01-2 — collects Harrier issues #5–8
