= Time Lord (role-playing game) =

Tabletop role-playing game

Adventures through Time and Space
- Designers: Ian Marsh; Peter Darvill-Evans
- Publishers: Virgin Publishing
- Publication: 1991
- Genres: Doctor Who

Time Lord — Adventures through Time and Space is a Doctor Who role-playing game, written by Ian Marsh and Peter Darvill-Evans and published in 1991 by Virgin Publishing.

== Gameplay ==
This game is totally unrelated to the previously released Doctor Who RPG by FASA, having different and simpler mechanics that often seemed arbitrary. For example, the companion Polly is a secretary yet according to her statistics, she can hardly read or write.

The system lacked any method for creating original player characters: it was suggested that the referee give the players a particular Doctor and his associated companions, or a group of Doctors. A later on-line supplement, "Timelord: Journeys", written by Nathaniel Torson, provided a system for creating original player characters. A variety of basic templates were provided ("The Soldier," "The Specialist," The Alien") and die roll ranges provided for determining attribute and skill values. Rules for purchasing alien abilities, generating random adventures, and using "Drama Points" to increase abilities and use Genre Tropes to simulate standard situations from the series were also provided.

The system revolves around the concept of "beating the difference" - Actions have a difficulty rating, from which the relevant attribute and skill is subtracted; the remaining number is the difference. Players roll two six-sided dice, and then take the difference of the two rolls; if that number is higher than the difference, the action is successful. The game includes many skills which are especially appropriate to the tone of Doctor Who, such as cheat death and macguffin.

The original game book includes extensive biographical information on all the companions of the TV series, as well as many of the villains. Also included is an incomplete original short story, "The Necromancers", with the idea the story could be completed as part of a game campaign. The text includes a solo adventure, Switchback. A full campaign, The Templar Throne, is also included. It takes place in a shopping mall.

== Publication history ==
The game was marketed with other Doctor Who books instead of other role-playing games. It was printed in paperback novel format, unlike other RPGs. In addition, Virgin was unknown in the gaming market. As a result, it did not sell well and aside from a few articles in Doctor Who Magazine, no supplements were published.

In 1996, the game was made available for free on the internet, along with updates for the game to include the Eighth Doctor. In the electronic version, the adventure The Templar Throne has been replaced with another campaign, The Curse of the Cyclops.

== Reception ==
Steve Crow reviewed Time Lord in White Wolf #49 (Nov., 1994), rating it a 2 out of 5 and stated that "Fans of the show are doomed to disappointment. Lack of time travel and character improvement mechanics limit Time Lord's appeal. The game is of some value as reference material and to the Doctor Who collector who wants everything related to the show."

== Reviews ==
- Journeys: Journal of Multidimensional Roleplaying #6
