= Fantasy Advertiser =

British fanzine focused on comic books

- Cover of Fantasy Advertiser #115 (1990), the magazine's final print issue, with art by Dave Sim.
- Editor: Martin Skidmore (1985–1989, 2010)
- Former editors: Frank Dobson; Dez Skinn; Colin Campbell; Martin Lock; Howard Stangroom
- Categories: comics, criticism, interviews
- Frequency: monthly
- Publisher: Trident Comics (1988–1989)
- First issue: 1965; 61 years ago
- Final issue Number: 1990; 115
- Country: United Kingdom
- Based in: London (1965–1988, 1990); Leicester (1988–1989)
- Language: English
- Website: comiczine-fa.com

Fantasy Advertiser, later abbreviated to FA, was a British fanzine focused on comic books, founded in 1965 by Frank Dobson, the "Godfather of British Fandom." Considered the first British comics fanzine, Fantasy Advertiser started out as an adzine focused on the sale of primarily second-hand comics; it eventually transitioned into a true comics fanzine. FA now operates as a comics webzine.

== Publication history ==
=== 1965–1979: Dobson/Skinn/McCartney era ===
Frank Dobson established Fantasy Advertiser as an adzine — essentially an advertising service for comic collectors. Dobson published 31 issues of Fantasy Advertiser, but when he emigrated to Australia in 1970 he handed the zine on to two contributors, Dez Skinn and Paul McCartney, to continue. (Dobson, meanwhile, returned from Australia and opened a comics retailing location, Weird Fantasy Bookshop, on Lewisham Way in New Cross.)

Skinn and McCartney expanded the magazine to include more articles and artwork. Regular contributors included Dave Gibbons, Steve Parkhouse, Paul Neary, Jim Baikie, and Kevin O'Neill. Skinn left in 1976, at which point it was taken over by retailer/distributor Colin Campbell, who edited FA until 1978. Dobson returned to publish five more issues in 1978–1979, when the fanzine went dormant.

=== 1981–1985: Lock era ===
After two years of dormancy, Fantasy Advertiser was revived in late 1981 by Martin Lock, fresh off publishing his long-running fanzine BEM. Lock incorporated the "BEM News Service" comic industry news feature into Fantasy Advertiser, as well as two other fanzines: Mike Taylor's Masters of Infinity and Colin Gould's Ogre.

=== 1985–1989: Skidmore & Neptune/Trident era ===
In 1985, after four years overseeing FA, Lock handed over the editorial reins to Martin Skidmore so Lock could focus on his next venture, the publishing company Harrier Comics.

Skidmore shortened the name to FA — he didn't want it to "sound like a sexual contacts mag," and wanted to move away from the equation of comics with fantasy, expanding coverage of different genres. Skidmore made the magazine more provocative and political.

Fantasy Advertiser won the 1985 Eagle Award for Favourite Specialist Comics Publication/Trade Publication—UK.

With issue #100 (March 1988), Fantasy Advertiser's publication was taken over by Neptune Distribution. Skidmore stayed on as editor of FA, while also becoming lead editor for Neptune's own Trident Comics line. During this period, writer Mike Carey wrote reviews and profiles for FA before launching his own career as a comics writer.

FA carried the Neptune logo through issue #107 (Oct. 1988), and the Trident Comics logo from that period forward.

Editor Skidmore and Neptune/Trident's final issue of FA was #114, dated October 1989.

=== 1990: Issue #115 ===
In 1990, a new, London-based, publisher, 30th Century Comics, revived FA and published issue #115, edited by Howard Stangroom (another long-time member of British comics fandom). Although intended to be produced on a bimonthly schedule, issue #115 proved to be FA's final print issue.

== Online relaunch ==
In October 2010, after a 20-year hiatus, Martin Skidmore relaunched FA as an online zine, including reviews, articles, interviews, and original comics.

Skidmore died less than a year after the return of FA; the e-zine is now published by Tony Keen, Andrew Moreton, and Will Morgan.

== Editors ==
- Frank Dobson — issues #1–31 (1965–1970)
- Dez Skinn (with Paul McCartney) — issues #32–58 (1970–1976)
- Colin Campbell — issues #59–64 (1976–1977)
- Frank Dobson — issues #65–69 (1978–June 1979)
- Martin Lock — issues #70–89 (Nov. 1981–1984)
- Martin Skidmore — issues #90-114 (1985–1989)
- Howard Stangroom — issue #115 (1990)

== Awards ==
- 1977 Eagle Award nomination for Favourite British Fan Publication
- 1978 Eagle Award nomination for Favourite Fan Publication
- 1985 Eagle Award for Favourite Speciality Comics Publication
- 1986 Eagle Award nomination for Favourite Specialist Comics Publication

== Reviews ==
- Imagine #2
- Imagine #4
- Imagine #6
- Imagine #11
- Imagine #13
- Imagine #15
- Imagine #17
- Imagine #19
- Imagine #21
- Imagine #27

== See also ==
- Speakeasy
- Rocket's Blast Comicollector
