= BEM (magazine) =

British fanzine focused on comic books

- Cover of issue #22 (Jan. 1979). Artwork by Hunt Emerson.
- Editor: Martin Lock
- Categories: Comics, News, Criticism, Interviews
- Frequency: 5 times a year
- Publisher: Martin Lock (1973–1980); New Media Publishing (1981–1982)
- First issue: November 17, 1973; 51 years ago
- Final issue Number: 1982; 36
- Country: United Kingdom
- Based in: London (1973–c. 1977); Worcester (c. 1977–1982)
- Language: English

BEM, originally known as Bemusing Magazine, was a British fanzine focused on comic books which was published from 1973 to 1982. The brainchild of Martin Lock and billed as "The Comics News Fanzine," BEM featured American and British comics industry news and gossip, interviews, comic reviews, essays, columns, and comic strips.

Over the years, BEM transitioned into a professionally produced comics magazine, and was the recipient of multiple Eagle Awards (as well as for publisher Lock). As time went on, the fanzine also became more of a "strip-zine," with original comics content — some of it written by Lock — increasing year by year. Notable artist contributors to BEM over the years included Brian Bolland, Dave Gibbons, Mike McMahon, Bryan Talbot, Chris Ash, and Dave Harwood.

== Publication history ==
Lock launched Bemusing Magazine on November 17, 1973, and he sold early issues to customers waiting outside the frequent comic marts held in London, as well as the annual edition of the British Comic Art Convention ("Comicon"). After producing the first three issues of Bemusing by himself, Lock began accepting contributions from others with issue #4 (Feb. 1975). Nige Edwards became Bemusing's assistant editor with issue #4, staying on until mid-1977. The zine produced roughly five issues a year.

One of Bemusing Magazine's key features was its publication of U.S.-based comics industry news that Lock acquired from the long-running American fanzine The Comic Reader (TCR). BEM was generally published on alternate months of Richard Burton's UK fanzine Comic Media News, which also used TCR news, thus providing a dose of monthly comic industry news for readers of both publications.

Bemusing #8 (Jan. 1976) was a combined issue with issue #4 of Rob Barrow's Comic Fandom Bulletin. Bemusing #9 (May 1976) was a double-issue, as it also contained the fanzine-within-a-fanzine The U.K. Heroine Addict, an attempt by Lock to increase British membership in the U.S.-based Comics Heroines Fan Club.

The title of the publication officially changed from Bemusing Magazine to BEM with issue #15 (Sept. 1977). (An earlier fanzine called BEM was published in the UK from 1954 to 1958; that fanzine — whose publishers included Mal Ashworth and Tom White — was focused on science fiction.)

BEM was a supporter of the Eagle Awards, which were introduced in 1977. BEM published nominating ballots in the lead-up to voting, and always posted a list of each year's Eagle Award winners. In later years, Lock polled his own readers with the "BEM Ballot."

With issue #16 (Dec. 1977), BEM began incorporating Mike Cruden's adzine Fantasy Trader into its pages. Cruden at that point became the fanzine's "consulting editor," staying in that role until 1980. One of Cruden's main duties was coordinating Reaction, the lengthy and spirited letters page, of BEM. (The British Amateur Press Association was formed in 1977 in part due to a letter published in Reaction.)

The covers of most early issues featured a selection of miniaturized reproductions of the comics being written about inside the issue. With issue #21 (Nov. 1978), BEM began featuring original covers, with art by the likes of Mike Higgs, Nick Neocleous, Chris Ash, Russ Nicholson, Hunt Emerson, Brian Bolland, Bryan Talbot, Dave Gibbons, Mike McMahon, Joe Staton, Colin Wilson, Dave Harwood, and Kevin O'Neill. Notable interior illustrators for BEM included Ash, Mercy Van Vlack, and Kev F. Sutherland.

BEM #31 (Dec. 1980) was a combined issue with another fanzine, Mike Taylor's Masters of Infinity #6. (Taylor became BEM's assistant editor at that time.)

By the late 1970s BEM had become the UK's leading comics zine, winning the Eagle Award for Favourite Fan Publication in both 1980 and 1981.

BEM was acquired by the U.S.-based publisher New Media Publishing (NMP) in 1981, ostensibly to distribute BEM in the U.S. and widen its readership. The changeover, however, led to production delays: issue #34 was published in July 1981 and issue #35 (NMP's first issue) didn't arrive until spring 1982. In addition, BEM's continued focus on the British comics scene led to low sales. The end came shortly when New Media Publishing went out of business in 1982. In the end, BEM published 36 issues from November 1973 to 1982.

In 1981, as BEM wound down, Lock revived Fantasy Advertiser, a popular British fanzine dating back to 1965 which had been dormant for years. Lock incorporated the "BEM News Service" comic industry news feature into Fantasy Advertiser, which he edited until 1985, putting out 20 issues. Meanwhile, in 1984, Lock started his own comics publisher, Harrier Comics, which operated until 1989.

== Features and columns ==
BEM featured a number of recurring columns by a regular stable of contributors, including Lock himself (News at BEM, Emlock Tale-Enders, and Worlds of Emlock), Ed Sallis (Fan Things), K. Williams (Sigh), Kathleen Glancy (Katholocity), Ruan Lanihorne (Made in Britain/Unamerican Activities), Rich Morrisey (Rich Morrisey's America), and Howard P. Siegel (Made in America).

- Bemusings/News at BEM — Lock's introduction to each issue
- Comics News — U.S. and British industry news, usually compiled by Lock
- Reg Uspatoff by "Reg Uspatoff" ("R.U.") — the title being a play on "U.S. Registered Patent Office"
- Rich Morrisey's America written by the publisher of the U.S. fanzine Batmania (issues #8–17)
- Made in Americaby Howard P. Siegel — U.S. comics history
- Made in Britain by Ruan Lanihorne; later became known as Unamerican Activities
- Mal Burns' Unamerican Activities
- Katholocity by Kathleen Glancy
- Sigh by K. Williams
- Fan-Things by Ed Sallis — "a column of fan news and fanzine reviews"
- Review Section (later known as Bemuscene) — with contributions from various reviewers
- Reaction — lengthy letters pages
- Emlock Tale-Enders by Martin Lock ("M. Lock") — usually at the back of the magazine
- Worlds of Emlock by Martin Lock

== Comic strips ==
Bemusing began publishing original comic strips early on, starting with Lock's own strip Captain Nuts (produced under his alias, "Superswipe"). Issue #8 saw the introduction of a dedicated comics page, "Page Four Funnies," which lasted until issue #12, when the strips began to be distributed throughout the fanzine. Cartoonist Chris Ash was a long-time contributor to BEM in the period 1976 to 1978, with his most regular strips being Captain Frog and The Adventures of Stangroom the Woodpecker (possibly a reference to fellow fanzine artist Howard Stangroom). Issue #20 of BEM (Aug. 1978) featured a 16-page Captain Frog story by Ash that took up a large portion of the issue.

Terry Moore's Thundermole was a regular feature in BEM from issue #13 (May 1977) until issue #34 (July 1981).

Starting with issue #25 (Sept. 1979) and running through the final issue was the ongoing science-fiction strip H.M.S. Conqueror, written by Lock and illustrated by Dave Harwood, with each strip often running 4-5 pages per issue. Stephen Baskerville was a guest artist on H.M.S. Conqueror with issue #30. A bonus episode of H.M.S. Conqueror, written and drawn by Paul Alexander, appeared in BEM's final issue, #36. (The stories published in BEM later made their way into the first few issues of Conqueror, the first title published by Lock when he founded Harrier Comics in 1984.)

BEM issue #25 also featured a seven-page comics story by Eddie Campbell, which was illustrated by Harwood. Other cartoonists with strips published in BEM over the years included Leslie Stannage, Philip Morton (Gleitzman), Martin Dutton, Martin Longley, Mark Casto, and J. H. Szostek. Other one-off strips were produced by the likes of Rex Dixon and Rob Davis (issues #23 & 24), Marc Baines (#14), and Dave Byrom (#14).

Regular strips in BEM over the years included:

- Captain Nuts by "Superswipe," "Schwipe" or "B. L. Schwipe" (some episodes written by Mark Bryant, penciled by Malcolm Lomax, and inked by Superswipe) (issues #6–12) — a spoof of Peanuts
- Mighty Man by Leslie Stannage (issues #9–12)
- Captain Frog by Chris Ash (issues #13–19)
- The Adventures of Stangroom the Woodpecker by Chris Ash (issues #13-16)
- Thundermole by Terry Moore (most issues #13–34)
- Blue Lamp by Terry Moore (issues #21, 28)
- Nasty Comix by Mark Casto (issues #23–28, 36) — underground comix-type strip
- H.M.S. Conqueror by Lockwood and Dave Harwood (issues #25–36)
- The Imago by B. J. Martin and Nick Martin (issues #28, 31–34) — a strip which moved over from the defunct fanzine Graffik Sense

== Notable interview subjects ==
Although BEM ran interviews in early issues, it began running regular interviews with comics industry figures in earnest with Dez Skinn in issue #27, March 1980.

- Rob Barrow (#9, May 1976)
- Pat Boyette (#36, 1982)
- Steve Gerber (#18, Apr. 1978)
- Dave Gibbons (#33, Apr. 1981)
- Alan Grant (#29, Aug. 1980)
- Fred Himes (#36, 1982)
- "Howard the Duck" (#12, Feb. 1977)
- Paul Levitz (#30, Nov. 1980)
- Lee Marrs (#32, Feb. 1981)
- Steve MacManus (#29, Aug. 1980)
- Bill Mantlo (#24, July 1979)
- Pat Mills (#35, Spring 1982)
- Arthur Ranson (#36, 1982)
- "Red Sonja" (#19, June 1978)
- P. Craig Russell (#33, Apr. 1981)
- Kurt Schaffenberger (#34, July 1981)
- Dez Skinn (#27, Mar. 1980)
- John Wagner (#29, Aug. 1980)

== Awards ==
BEM was nominated for the Eagle Award for "Favourite Fan Publication" three times, winning the award in 1980 and 1981. The fanzine had earlier led to publisher Lock winning two Eagle Awards — the 1977 Eagle for "Favourite British Fan Personality" and the 1978 Eagle for "Favourite British Writer". (Lock was also nominated for the 1977 Eagle for "Favourite British Comics Writer".)

== See also ==
- Fantasy Advertiser
- Speakeasy
