= Peter Darvill-Evans =

British writer

Peter Darvill-Evans (born 1954) is an English writer and editor.

== Early life ==
He was born and lived in Buckinghamshire until he went to university, graduating in 1975 from University College, London with a degree in History.

== Career ==
In 1976 Darvill-Evans joined the staff of Games Centre, a specialist games shop in London. He became the manager of a branch of the shop, then manager of wholesale sales, selling board games and eventually role-playing games.

In 1979 he became employed by Games Workshop, becoming first its Trade Sales Manager, then General Manager, responsible for purchases, sales, distribution and magazine publishing. When Games Workshop relocated to Nottingham, Darvill-Evans left the company, preferring to stay in London. He then wrote his first of three Fighting Fantasy gamebooks for Puffin Books.

In 1989, he became a junior editor at W. H. Allen Ltd, initially overseeing the Target Books imprint. He also oversaw the Nexus imprint of erotic fiction for men, redesigning its logo and cover style as well as changing its editorial direction.

Target's main output was novelisations of the popular science-fiction television series Doctor Who, and when Darvill-Evans arrived he immediately realised that there were very few Doctor Who stories left to novelise. This problem was exacerbated by the cancellation of the television series at the end of 1989. When WH Allen sold the Nexus and Doctor Who lines to Virgin Publishing, Darvill-Evans went with them. Deciding to go freelance, he was made redundant at his own request, and entered negotiations with the BBC to license Virgin to produce full-length, original novels carrying on the story of the series from the point where the television programme had left off.

Launched in 1991, this successful line of novels were known as the New Adventures. Darvill-Evans set down guidelines for the writers, and even wrote one novel himself, Deceit. Other output from the Virgin fiction department during his time there included another series of Doctor Who novels (the Missing Adventures, featuring previous Doctors and companions); a series of novels following the character of Bernice Summerfield; the Virgin Worlds imprint of new mainstream science-fiction and fantasy novels. Non-science fiction lines included Black Lace, the first mainstream erotic fiction imprint targeted at women; the Crime and Passion imprint; Idol, a homoerotic fiction imprint for men; and Sapphire, a lesbian erotica line.

Other successes included media-tie in books such as the Red Dwarf Programme Guide, which served as the template for guides about other cult television series, and a series of novelisations based on the Jimmy McGovern-scripted series Cracker starring Robbie Coltrane.

By 1997, however, Virgin Publishing decided to emphasise more non-fiction books by and about celebrities. Their Doctor Who licence renewal negotiations fell in 1996, a year in which the BBC was seeking to bring all the Doctor Who licences back in house. Consequently, Virgin's Doctor Who licence was not renewed and instead the BBC opted to launch their own series of Doctor Who novels. In 1998, Darvill-Evans managed among other projects the editing and production of Virgin's Guide to British Universities, and personally supervised the copy-editing and proofreading of Richard Branson's autobiography Losing My Virginity.

Virgin closed its fiction department in 1999, with Darvill-Evans departing the company and moving to Southampton. He continued to freelance, writing several Doctor Who novels for BBC Books, amongst various other editing and writing work.

In 2001 he began working for the Inland Revenue, subsequently renamed HM Revenue and Customs, and became an Inspector of Taxes.

Working full time for HMRC has left little time for writing, but Darvill-Evans has maintained his interest in the worlds of cult fiction, in particular Doctor Who and Fighting Fantasy. He has contributed to the following:

- 2005 - a contributory interviewee for a documentary about author Terrance Dicks included in the BBC's remastered DVD edition of the Doctor Who TV series The Horror of Fang Rock
- 2007 - short story Home published in the book Bernice Summerfield - Missing Adventures, published by Big Finish Productions and edited by Rebecca Levene
- 2010 - a contributory interviewee for a documentary feature about Doctor Who books included in the BBC's remastered DVD edition of the Doctor Who 1996 movie
- 2013 - a contributory interviewee for the BBC Radio 2 documentary Who Is The Doctor?
- 2013 - a contributory interviewee for a documentary feature included in the BBC's remastered DVD edition of the Doctor Who TV series The Ark In Space
- 2015 - the main contributing interviewee for the DVD documentary Mythmakers - Virgin Publishing - Doctor Who Books, published by Reeltime Pictures
- 2017, 2018, 2019, 2022 - panel guest at the conventions Fighting Fantasy Fest, Fighting Fantasy Fest 2, Fighting Fantasy Fest 3 and Fighting Fantasy Fest 4.
- 2021 - contributed text and photographs to The Who Adventures, a large-format, hardback, full-colour-illustrated book that provided a detailed and comprehensive history of the Doctor Who novels and short stories published by Virgin Publishing under Darvill-Evans' direction during the 1990s. Published by Telos Publishing, ISBN 978-1-84583-185-1.
- 2022 - panel guest at a commemorative event for the Doctor Who author Terrance Dicks.
- 2022 - contributed text and photographs to Dice Men: The Origin Story Of Games Workshop by Ian Livingstone, published by Unbound, ISBN 978-1-80018-052-9.
- 2023 - panellist and speaker at Novel Experiences, a gathering of authors and readers of the Doctor Who New Adventures.
- 2024 - the main contributing interviewee for the DVD documentary Novel Experiences - the Virgin Books Adventures, published by Reeltime Pictures; appointed to the committee of the Southampton Archaeological Society.

Having retired from HMRC at the end of March 2022, Darvill-Evans has resumed writing - very slowly. In November 2022 and March 2023 he performed his first (and so far only) solo gigs as a singer/guitarist.

== Bibliography ==
- Fighting Fantasy: Beneath Nightmare Castle (1987) (ISBN 0-14-032238-8)
- Fighting Fantasy: Portal of Evil (1989) (ISBN 0-14-032839-4)
- The New Story of O (translation from French) (1990)
- Fighting Fantasy: Spectral Stalkers (1991)
- Doctor Who – Time Lord (1991) (ISBN 0-426-20362-3) (a gamebook with Ian Marsh)
- Seven pseudonymous novels for the Nexus imprint between 1991 and 2002
- The Image (translation from French) (1992)
- Doctor Who: Deceit (1993) (ISBN 0-426-20387-9)
- Doctor Who: Independence Day (2000) (ISBN 0-563-53804-X)
- Doctor Who: Asylum (2001) (ISBN 0-563-53833-3)
