= Ian Marsh (writer) =

British writer and editor (born 1960)

Ian Marsh (born 2 October 1960 in Canterbury, Kent, England) is a British writer, magazine editor, and entrepreneur.

== Early life ==
Ian Marsh grew up in Ramsgate. When he was a child, he fell ill with mumps and was confined to bed; because of this, his father bought him a Westland Lysander model kit by Airfix. After he got better, more aircraft kits followed. At age 12, Marsh switched to painting Airfix's line of plastic Napoleonic soldiers, and after a friend told him about rules for playing with Napoleonic soldiers, he became a wargamer. A few years later he was introduced to a newly published game, Dungeons & Dragons, which he played with two school friends, Mike Lewis and Marc Gascoigne.

== Fanzine ==
The three friends started writing, editing and self-publishing the role-playing game fanzine DragonLords. The relatively popular fanzine also included reviews, articles about computer games, and a regular column about Diplomacy. Marsh continued to publish DragonLords after he entered university in 1978, and it was well-regarded, even garnering a positive review from Dungeons & Dragons co-creator Gary Gygax in distant Lake Geneva, Wisconsin, who wrote "DragonLords is a well done amateur effort which seems bent on improving itself and the hobby." Paul Mason considered Marsh's experience with DragonLords "a stepping stone to professional involvement in publishing".

In 1985, in his role as a fanzine publisher, Marsh became the first keeper of what would become known as the Diana Jones Award. The pyramid-shaped piece of lucite containing the last semi-burnt copy of TSR's The Adventures of Indiana Jones Role-Playing Game had been created by staff of TSR (UK) after the American TSR office told them to dispose of all remaining copies of the game. At a games convention, the pyramid was given to Ian Marsh as the leader of a group of small press and fanzine editors. Marsh kept the pyramid for several years until he got married. He then passed the pyramid on to games designer and publisher James Wallis, who came up with the idea of giving it out as an annual award for "excellence in gaming" at the Gencon games convention.

The Table of Contents of White Dwarf #77 containing a hidden acrostic

== Editor ==
After graduating from University of Surrey with an honours degree in Materials Technology (metallurgy) in 1983, Marsh spent a year at an industrial placement with IBM in Havant. Looking for a different career, Marsh joined the staff of Games Workshop in London as editorial assistant on Games Workshop's role-playing magazine White Dwarf. With less time on his hands to publish his fanzine, Marsh brought DragonLords to a close with Issue 22. In addition to his editorial duties, Marsh also wrote some material for White Dwarf, including the Fighting Fantasy role-playing adventure Beyond the Shadow of a Dream that appeared in Issue 61 (January 1985).

Marsh advanced to assistant editor of White Dwarf, and then eventually succeeded Ian Livingstone as editor. His first edition at the helm was Issue #74. However, it was during this time that Warhammer was developed for Games Workshop by Bryan Ansell of sister company Citadel Miniatures, Rick Priestley and Richard Halliwell. The game proved enormously popular, driving sales of Citadel's fantasy range of figurines. Bryan Ansell subsequently led a management buyout of Games Workshop. After becoming managing director of Games Workshop, Ansell then announced he was moving Games Workshop (and White Dwarf) from London to Nottingham, where Citadel Miniatures was located. Ian Marsh refused to move, and resigned as editor of White Dwarf after only four issues. In the Table of Contents in White Dwarf #77, Marsh's last issue, the first letter of each item description formed an acrostic that read "SOD OFF BRYAN ANSELL".

== Writer and editor ==
In 1986, Marsh joined the staff of the new (but short-lived) Adventurer magazine, writing a column of games industry news and gossip titled "The Town Crier" that first appeared in Issue 3 (August-September 1986). Marsh's final column appeared in Issue 9 (April 1987), shortly before the magazine's demise.

In 1989, Marsh realized that the Doctor Who game license owned by FASA had expired, and he approached Peter Darvill-Evans at Virgin Books about creating a new Doctor Who role-playing game. The two men produced the role-playing game Time Lord, published as a paperback in 1991. By 1996, after the book had fallen out of print, Marsh regained the rights to Time Lord and made it available as a free download on the internet.

In the early 1990s, the British games magazine Games International morphed into Strategy Plus. Marsh became a writer and was credited as Production Consultant. When Strategy Plus combined with an American magazine to become Computer Games Strategy Plus, Marsh joined the magazine's UK staff as production editor in late 1991. However the magazine did not flourish in the UK, and the British side of the magazine folded in May 1992.

== Miniatures ==
A chance meeting with old school friend Mike Lewis persuaded Marsh to start playing Napoleonic wargames again. After trying several sets of rules, Marsh started to develop his own.

In 1999, Marsh moved to Freshwater on the Isle of Wight and established a company called "Fighting 15s". The company's business consisted of Marsh painting 15 mm Napoleonic figurines to order. As his eyesight worsened with age, Marsh scaled back the painting business and Fighting 15s became a UK mail order firm and distribution agent for several miniatures companies including Eureka Miniatures (Australia), Oddzial Osmy (Poland), AB Figures (UK) and Black Hat Miniatures (UK).

Marsh formed a publishing wing of the company called Oozlum Games, and used it to market several properties including:

- Huzzah!, a set of Napolenic rules written by Marsh;
- Martian Empires by Mike Lewis, a wargame in the Victorian science fiction style of H. G. Wells that uses the Martian Empires miniatures.
