= The Adventures of Luther Arkwright =

Comic book limited series

- The cover of issue #2 of the Valkyrie Press edition of The Adventures of Luther Arkwright.

Publication information
- Publisher: Valkyrie Press
- Schedule: Monthly
- Format: Limited series
- Publication date: Oct. 1987 – April 1989
- No. of issues: 9
- Main character: Luther Arkwright

Creative team
- Created by: Bryan Talbot
- Written by: Bryan Talbot
- Penciller: Bryan Talbot
- Inker: Bryan Talbot
- Letterer: Steve Haynie
- Editor: Bryan Talbot

Collected editions
- The Adventures of Luther Arkwright: ISBN 1-59307-725-4

The Adventures of Luther Arkwright is a nine-issue comic book limited series written and drawn by Bryan Talbot in the period 1978–1989. The story is adult in tone, with many mythological, historical, and political references, and a little explicit sex.

In 2003 English writer Warren Ellis called Arkwright "probably the single most influential graphic novel to have come out of Britain to date... probably Anglophone comics' single most important experimental work". The series was nominated for eight Eagle Awards in 1988, winning four: Best New Comic, Favourite Character, and Best Comic Cover, with Talbot winning the award for Favourite Artist. In addition, the book was given the 1989 Mekon Award for "Best British Work" by the Society of Strip Illustration.

== Overview ==
The character of Luther Arkwright owes something to the influence of Michael Moorcock's Jerry Cornelius stories, though Moorcock and Talbot agree that the similarities between the characters are limited.

Arkwright made his first appearance in the mid-1970s in "The Papist Affair", a short strip for Brainstorm Comix where Arkwright teamed up with a group of cigar-chewing biker nuns to recover the sacred relics of "St. Adolf of Nuremberg" from "a buncha male chauvinist priests". (Note: "The Papist Affair" was reprinted in Bryan Talbot's Brainstorm: The Complete Chester P. Hackenbush and Other Underground Classics, released by Alchemy Publications in 1999, ISBN 0-9508487-1-9.)

== Synopsis ==
Luther Arkwright is a work of apocalyptic science fiction set in parallel universes. The eponymous hero has the unique talent of being able to move between universes purely by force of will, and is aided by Rose Wylde, a telepath whose many incarnations across the parallels can communicate with one another. Luther and Rose are agents of a parallel universe known as "zero-zero", whose stable position in the multiverse has allowed the development of a world at peace with itself and sufficiently high technology to monitor the parallels for signs of the malign influence of the "Disruptors".

Most of the action in the story is set in a parallel world where the English Civil War has been indefinitely prolonged by the actions of the Disruptors, who are also responsible for unleashing "Firefrost", a legendary artifact that is destabilizing the multiverse. Arkwright intervenes on the Royalist side to draw out the Disruptors and locate and destroy Firefrost. Along the way his unit is ambushed, and he is killed, only to return to life with his powers enhanced.

The storytelling of the early episodes is complex, with flashbacks to Arkwright's upbringing by the Disruptors, escape to the parallel of his birth, and early missions for zero-zero intermingling with the course of his mission in neo-Cromwellian England, with story-telling techniques and art styles shifting to match. The scenes of Arkwright's death and rebirth are particularly abstract and full of religious and mythological symbolism. The comic is unusual in being one of the few adventure stories where the readers and the protagonist both know from the beginning that he will die; only the event itself is not known.

The later parts of the story have a more straightforward, linear form. In the end, Arkwright, having completed his mission, renounces violence.

== Publication history ==
The Adventures of Luther Arkwright had a start-and-stop publication history, beginning in 1978 and not being completed until 1989. The first parts of the story appeared as a five-part serial in the British underground comic Near Myths in 1978–1980.

The story continued in the comics anthology pssst! in 1982. After five more episodes, however, the story was interrupted when pssst! was canceled, less than half complete. Before shutting down, pssst!'s publisher, Serge Boissevain, collected all the Luther Arkwright stories — including the material from Near Myths — in a trade paperback called The Adventures of Luther Arkwright Book 1: Rat Trap.

Between 1987 and 1989 Talbot completed the story, which was published as a series of nine standard comic books by Valkyrie Press, followed, at readers' request, by a tenth issue, titled ARKeology, containing articles about the history and production of the comic and some extended back story and character information.

In 1987, Serge Boissevain paid for the printing of the Valkyrie Press trade paperback, The Adventures of Luther Arkwright Book 2: Transfiguration. In 1989, under the publisher name Proutt, he published the final trade paperback, Book 3: Götterdämmerung.

=== Later publications ===
The entire series was subsequently published in the United States by Dark Horse Comics.

In 2005 the artwork was digitally remastered by Comics Centrum for an edition in Czech (Dobrodružství Luther Arkwrighta), allowing proper reproduction of both light and dark parts of "tonal" pages. The new artwork was also used for a French edition by Kymera Comics. Bryan Talbot has described the Czech edition as "the best ever published". In 2006, the story was republished as a webcomic using the digitally remastered files at the official fan page.

=== Collected editions ===
- The Adventures of Luther Arkwright Book 1: Rat Trap. London: Never Editions. 1982. ISBN 9780907865025. — introduction by Ramsey Campbell
- The Adventures of Luther Arkwright Book 2: Transfiguration. Bristol: Valkyrie Press. December 1987. ISBN 978-1870923002. — introduction by Alan Moore
- The Adventures of Luther Arkwright Book 3: Götterdämmerung. Preston, UK: Proutt. 1989. ISBN 0-907865-03-8. — introduction by Iain Banks
- The Adventures of Luther Arkwright. Milwaukie, Oregon: Dark Horse Comics. 1997. ISBN 1-56971-255-7.; republished in 2004 and 2007
- Arkwright Integral. Milwaukie, Oregon: Dark Horse Books. 2 December 2014. ISBN 978-1616553876. — foreword by Michael Moorcock; also includes the 1999 sequel Heart of Empire

== Sequels ==
In 1999, Dark Horse Comics published Talbot's sequel to Luther Arkwright, called Heart of Empire: The Legacy of Luther Arkwright.

A third story, The Legend of Luther Arkwright, was published in the UK in July 2022 by Jonathan Cape. The much delayed American edition by Dark Horse Comics was released in for December 2024.

== In other media ==
=== Audio adaptation ===
The Adventures of Luther Arkwright

Big Finish Productions audio drama
- Series: New Worlds
- Release no.: 1
- Featuring: David Tennant, Paul Darrow, Siri O'Neal
- Written by: Bryan Talbot, adapted by Mark Wright
- Directed by: Jason Haigh-Ellery
- Produced by: Jason Haigh-Ellery
- Executive producer: none
- Production code: LACD01
- Length: 3 hrs 3 min
- Release date: March 2005

In 2005, The Adventures of Luther Arkwright was made into a full-cast, three-CD audio adventure by Big Finish Productions, starring David Tennant (cast near the time of the CD's release as the Tenth Doctor in Doctor Who) and Paul Darrow (Avon in Blake's 7).

Cast

- Luther Arkwright — David Tennant
- Cromwell — Paul Darrow
- Rose — Siri O'Neal
- Karl/Czar Nicholas — Robert Jezek
- Computer/Octobriana/Emily — Michelle Livingstone
- Archduke — Robert Lockwood, Jr.
- Montpelier/Wittgenstein — Alfred Hoffman
- Miranda/Lady-in-waiting — Zoe Robinson
- Standish/the Scientist — Andrew Westfield
- The Disruptor/Harry Fairfax/the Interrogator/The Five — Jeremy James
- Pennington — Robert Curbishley
- Whitelaw — Mark Donovan
- King Charles — Steve Dineen
- Princess Anne — India Fisher

In 2023, Big Finish produced an audio adaptation of the 1999 Arkwright sequel, Heart of Empire. David Tennant returned as Arkwright, along with the entire cast from the 2005 production, with the exception of Paul Darrow, who had died in 2019.

=== Feature film adaptation ===
In 2006, Benderspink announced a live action film adaptation of Arkwright, with producers Andrew Prowse and Sophie Patrick. According to Talbot, the rights for the project lapsed in June 2010.

=== Television adaptation ===
In 2021, Three River Studios announced to adapt Arkwright into a live-action television series. The Arkwright series would be produced by Three River CEO Jonathan Drake, with Talbot acting as executive producer.
