= The Dark Phoenix Saga =

Marvel Comics X-Men storyline

- Cover of Uncanny X-Men vol. 135, July 1980, art by John Byrne
- Publisher: Marvel Comics
- Publication date: January – October 1980
- Genre: Superhero
- Title(s): The Uncanny X-Men #129–138
- Main character(s): X-Men; Hellfire Club; Lilandra Neramani; Shi'ar Imperial Guard; Phoenix Force

Creative team
- Writer(s): Chris Claremont; John Byrne
- Penciller: John Byrne
- Inker: Terry Austin
- Letterer: Tom Orzechowski
- Colorist: Glynis Wein
- Dark Phoenix Saga: ISBN 0-7851-2213-3

"The Dark Phoenix Saga" is an extended X-Men comic-book storyline published by Marvel Comics. Created by writer Chris Claremont and artist John Byrne, the storyline first appeared in X-Men #129 (January 1980). It focuses on the superhero Jean Grey and the cosmic entity Phoenix Force. The storyline commonly refers to the story in Uncanny X-Men #129–138 (January – October 1980) of Jean Grey's corruption by the power of the Phoenix and the Hellfire Club, the destruction she causes, and ultimately her death. Sometimes included is Jean Grey's assumption of the Phoenix power and the repair of the M'Kraan Crystal in Uncanny X-Men #101–108 (October 1976 – December 1977).

"The Dark Phoenix Saga" is one of the best-known and heavily referenced stories in mainstream American superhero comics, and is widely considered to be a classic storyline by critics. Many of its characters who debuted in this story arc would later go on to become some of the most popular comic book characters of all time.

Since its introduction in comics, the storyline has been featured in various other Marvel-licensed products. It was adapted for X-Men: The Animated Series (1992). It was later alluded to in the live-action film X2 (2003). The live-action film X-Men: The Last Stand (2006) contains some elements from the saga. The animated series Wolverine and the X-Men (2009) adapted "The Dark Phoenix Saga" at the end of its first season, though it changed many elements of the story. Had there been a fifth season of the animated series X-Men: Evolution (2000), its own version of the four-part Dark Phoenix would have been adapted. The live-action X-Men film Dark Phoenix (2019) is an adaptation of the Hellfire arc of the story.

== Summary ==
Returning from a mission in space, Jean Grey is exposed to deadly solar flare radiation, and briefly attains her ultimate potential as a telepath and telekinetic. Jean becomes a being of pure thought, and then re-forms herself upon return to Earth with the new costume, identity and power of "Phoenix". It is with this new power that Jean repairs the fractured M'Kraan Crystal, but voluntarily restrains her powers afterward in order to keep them under control.

Her vast potential makes her a target for Mastermind, who is attempting to prove himself in order to join the prestigious Inner Circle of the Hellfire Club. Under the identity of Jason Wyngarde, he begins to seduce Jean. With the help of a mind-tap device created by the Club's White Queen, Emma Frost, Mastermind projects his illusions directly into Phoenix's mind. These illusions cause her to believe that she is reliving the memories of an ancestor, Lady Grey, who in Mastermind's illusions was the Hellfire Club's Black Queen and the lover of one of Wyngarde's ancestors. Phoenix eventually accepts the Black Queen as her actual identity, a decadent role that allows her to relish the extremes of human emotion and that begins to break down the barriers that she had erected.

She helps the Hellfire Club capture the X-Men, and Jean's true love Cyclops faces Mastermind in a psychic duel. When Mastermind kills Cyclops' psychic image, it breaks his hold over Jean's psyche and shatters the final barriers on her power. Experiencing this power in its totality overwhelms Jean, and she renames herself "Dark Phoenix". Enraged at Mastermind, she uses a telepathic illusion to make him experience godhood, driving him insane. To break her ties with her less powerful identity as Jean Grey, she strikes down the X-Men and departs for a distant galaxy. However, her power proves to be far more limited than she thought; the intergalactic trip leaves her almost completely drained. To recharge, she devours the energy of the nearby D'Bari star, causing a supernova which kills the entire population of the only civilized planet orbiting the star. A Shi'ar vessel attacks to prevent her from destroying other stars. Dark Phoenix easily destroys the vessel, but not before they alert the Shi'ar Empress Lilandra Neramani. A council of intergalactic associates is gathered, including the Kree and Skrull empires, and concludes that Dark Phoenix is an even more serious threat than the planet-consuming Galactus and must be destroyed.

On Earth, the X-Men are greeted by Avengers member (and former X-Man) Beast. Dark Phoenix returns to Earth, to her family's home, and finds herself conflicted between her normal feelings for her loved ones and her new destructive impulses as Dark Phoenix. The X-Men attack her but are again defeated. Her mentor, Charles Xavier, arrives, and through a vicious psychic duel, he creates a new set of psychic "circuit-breakers" which reduce her to only her original Marvel Girl powers. This allows Jean's normal personality to reassert control.

Phoenix consumes a star, inadvertently killing billions of people.

The Shi'ar abduct the X-Men, tell them of Dark Phoenix's casual genocide, and declare that she must be put to death. Xavier challenges Lilandra to Arin'n Haelar, a Shi'ar duel of honor that cannot be refused. After conferring with the Kree and Skrulls, Lilandra agrees to Xavier's demand.

The next day, the X-Men and the Shi'ar Imperial Guard are teleported to the Blue Area of the Moon to do battle, with the victors deciding the fate of Phoenix. The Imperial Guard defeat most of the X-Men, leaving Cyclops and Phoenix alone to make a final stand. When Cyclops is seemingly killed, Jean's panic overrides Xavier's psychic restraints and restores her to Dark Phoenix. Lilandra initiates Plan Omega, which would consist of destroying the whole Solar System in hopes of eliminating Dark Phoenix in the process. Xavier orders the X-Men to subdue Jean to preempt Lilandra's emergency measure. They battle her until she regains her senses. Running inside one of the Blue Area's ruins, Jean, struggling to keep control, activates an ancient Kree weapon that disintegrates her after an emotional good-bye to Cyclops. He deduces that Jean had planned her sacrifice from the moment they had landed on the Moon.

The story ends with Uatu the Watcher commenting that "Jean Grey could have lived to become a god. But it was more important to her that she die...a human."

== Background and creation ==
Cover to Uncanny X-Men #136. Art by John Byrne.

According to Byrne, it had become a problem storywise that Claremont kept writing Phoenix stronger and stronger, making her the dominating element of the X-Men book. Steven Grant then suggested they should make her a villain to solve the issue, and eventually it seemed like the best solution to get the book back on track.

The segment of the saga set at the Hellfire Club (Uncanny X-Men #132–134) was heavily inspired by the Avengers television episode "A Touch of Brimstone", and some of the characters' appearances were modeled after the cast of "A Touch of Brimstone" as a subtle acknowledgment of the inspiration.

The ending of the story was a matter of intense controversy with the editorial staff. Jim Shooter's recollections are that the intent of the Dark Phoenix storyline was to introduce Dark Phoenix as a cosmic nemesis for the X-Men. This was what had been discussed amongst the creative team and Shooter, and this was the story development that had been approved. When Uncanny X-Men issue 135 was in the final artwork stages, Shooter happened to look at the proofs for the issue and noticed that the story included the destruction of an inhabited solar system, with an explicit mention of billions of lives lost. Louise Simonson feels it was Shooter's outrage over this plot element which led to him taking editor Jim Salicrup off the series several issues earlier than he had been scheduled to.

Upon questioning Salicrup about where the plot went from there, he was told that issue 137 ended with Jean being permanently depowered by the Shi'ar and released into the custody of the X-Men. Shooter disagreed with this development both from a storytelling standpoint as well as, secondarily, a moral standpoint, likening the ending to "taking the German army away from Hitler and letting him go back to governing Germany," and finding it out of character for the X-Men to retain friendly relations with a being who had committed genocide. Byrne and Salicrup explained that they had no problem with this resolution because they had always thought of Dark Phoenix as a separate entity who had possessed Jean Grey, with Salicrup drawing an analogy to the film adaptation of The Exorcist: "In the movie there's this little girl who's taken over and several people get killed, but by the end, when the demon's gone no one thinks, 'Let's kill that murderous little girl.'" However, on reading the issues over, they agreed with Shooter that from the reader's perspective, she did not seem to be possessed, and Claremont admitted that while writing the Dark Phoenix Saga he was never clear in his own mind whether Jean Grey was possessed or her actions as Dark Phoenix were her own.

Shooter, during a conversation with Claremont, suggested a scenario where Jean would be permanently imprisoned as a compromise, and Claremont responded that such a scenario was unfeasible since in his opinion, the X-Men would want to continually try to rescue Jean from imprisonment. According to Shooter, Claremont out of frustration suggested that they kill off Jean completely. Although Shooter suggests that the proposed plot point was a bluff by Claremont, playing on the unwritten rule that main characters were not to be killed permanently, he accepted it, even over later objections by both Claremont and Byrne. Ultimately, it was decided by Byrne and Claremont to have Jean commit suicide after her Dark Phoenix persona resurfaces at the climax of the fight against the Imperial Guard. Issue 137 was left largely unchanged, but the last five pages were completely rewritten and redrawn for the new ending, and Claremont also took the opportunity to write a second draft of his script. Because of this, comparison of the original and published versions of X-Men #137 reveals numerous differences in the script with no connection to the ending; for instance, in the original version of the day of rest, the individual X-Men are each thinking of their own personal issues, while the published version shows them reflecting on their decision to protect Jean.

The original ending ultimately saw print in 1984 in Phoenix: The Untold Story. Besides the original version of Uncanny X-Men #137, it featured a transcript of a round table discussion between Claremont, Byrne, Simonson, Salicrup, Shooter, and inker Terry Austin, discussing the story behind the original ending and why it was changed.

== Jean Grey and Phoenix as separate entities ==
Shortly before the publication of Uncanny X-Men #137, future freelance writer Kurt Busiek, then still a college student, heard about the upcoming events through the fan grapevine, as did fellow future comics pros Carol Kalish (who would go on to head up Marvel's Direct Sales Department for years) and Richard Howell (artist of the Vision and The Scarlet Witch 12-issue limited series, among others). The three of them also heard that Marvel editor-in-chief Jim Shooter had declared that Jean Grey could not be revived unless it was done in such a way as to render her guiltless of Dark Phoenix's crimes. Taking this as a creative challenge, all three then-fans decided to come up with their own resurrection scenario. Busiek's involved the discovery that Jean Grey was still on the bottom of Jamaica Bay in suspended animation following the original shuttle crash and that the Phoenix entity had used her body and mind as a lens, creating an immensely powerful duplicate of Jean, but one which grew more corrupted and distorted the longer it remained separate from the true Jean.

In 1982, Dark Phoenix resurfaced in the DC/Marvel intercompany crossover one-shot The Uncanny X-Men and The New Teen Titans, written by regular X-Men writer Chris Claremont. The story (which is not part of DC or Marvel canon) has the cosmic villain Darkseid resurrect Jean Grey in her Dark Phoenix persona as part of his quest to discover the secret of the Anti-Life Equation. In the end, Dark Phoenix is betrayed by Darkseid and sacrifices her life yet again to stop Darkseid.

Also in 1983, shortly after beginning a freelance writing career, Kurt Busiek attended a comics convention in Ithaca, New York, staying at the home of Marvel writer Roger Stern. In conversation, both writers' longtime interest in the X-Men came up, and Stern expressed regret that there was no way to bring Jean back, not while satisfying Shooter's edict. Busiek told Stern his idea, not expecting it to amount to more than idle conversation. Later, Stern told the idea to John Byrne, then writer/artist of Fantastic Four.

In 1985, Jim Shooter greenlit a new series that would reunite the original X-Men into a new team called X-Factor, to be written by longtime freelancer Bob Layton. Hearing of this, Byrne called Layton and suggested Busiek's idea as a means of raising Jean Grey from the dead while satisfying Shooter's demands for total absolution for Jean.

A three-part crossover was planned to launch X-Factor, involving the Avengers, the Fantastic Four, and the debut issue of X-Factor, thus involving Avengers writer Stern, Fantastic Four writer/artist Byrne and X-Factor writer Layton. Busiek, by that time, was working at Marvel as a freelance assistant editor on Marvel Age Magazine. He was paid and credited for the idea, and edited a series of interviews for Marvel Age promoting the new series. Everything in the interviews pertaining to Jean's resurrection was marked out with black tape to create an air of mystery about the revelations that the crossover would involve, and Busiek thus found himself taping over all mention of his idea.

While the retroactive depiction of Jean Grey and Phoenix as separate entities remains canon, later stories established a middle ground regarding the unique relationship between the two. Claremont would establish an extradimensional mutual home for the two, the White Hot Room, in which both entities reside between resurrections. At the conclusion of the "Inferno" event, Jean absorbs all the memories of Phoenix's experiences from its first appearance as Jean through the end of the Dark Phoenix Saga. Writer Grant Morrison would ultimately establish that only by merging with Jean at her most powerful as the "One True Phoenix" could the Phoenix realize its full potential in physical form as the White Phoenix of the Crown.

== Cultural impact and legacy ==
=== Critical response ===
Jay Edidin of Polygon included "The Dark Phoenix Saga" in their "9 Greatest X-Men Stories of All Time" list, writing, "Ask any fan to pinpoint the classic, iconic X-Men story, and most will send you straight to Uncanny X-Men #129-138: the issues that chronicle the corruption and fall of the cosmically empowered Jean Grey. It's also the story that has seen by far the largest number of (attempted) adaptations over the years, including the upcoming Dark Phoenix. All of that is because The Dark Phoenix Saga is the X-Men at their best: fighting as and for their found family and the fate of the world, backs to the wall, in the face of impossible odds. It's got pretty much everything that makes the X-Men great: not just high-stakes superpowered fights, but also high drama, found family, and some pretty spectacular science fiction." Anubhav Chaudhry of Sportskeeda ranked "The Dark Phoenix Saga" 1st in their "10 Best Comic Book Storylines of Marvel Comics" list, saying, "With stunning artwork and gripping storytelling, The Dark Phoenix Saga is a masterpiece of comic book storytelling that has influenced countless writers and artists in the years since its publication." Pierce Lydon of Newsarama ranked "The Dark Phoenix Saga" 1st in their "Best X-Men Stories" list, asserting, "If there's one story that defines the X-Men above all others, it's 'The Dark Phoenix Saga,' in which Chris Claremont and John Byrne's somewhat tumultuous creative relationship begins to come to an end with one of the greatest superhero stories ever told," while Chris Arrant ranked it 2nd in their "Best Marvel Comics Stories of All Time" list.

David Harth of Comic Book Resources ranked "The Dark Phoenix Saga" 1st in their "X-Men: 10 Story Arcs Every Fan Should Read" list, stating, "The Dark Phoenix Saga introduces so many things to X-Men lore, like the Hellfire Club and Kitty Pryde, concepts that would pay dividends over the years. Claremont and Byrne kill it in this one, presenting a tale that is not only considered the best X-Men story of all time but one of the best comics of all time in general." Joe Garza of /Film ranked "The Dark Phoenix Saga" 1st in their "15 Best X-Men Comics You Need To Read" list, writing, "The "Dark Phoenix Saga" is quite possibly THE signature X-Men storyline, the one that perfectly embodies the heroes' commitment to doing the right thing even when the world (or galaxy, in this case) hates and fears you." Jesse Schedeen of IGN ranked "The Dark Phoenix Saga" 2nd in their "25 Greatest X-Men Stories" list and called it "one of the most iconic Marvel stories of all time," saying, "The sheer variety of this story sets it apart, but not as much as the raw emotion and the satisfaction of seeing Claremont wrap up so many loose ends at once. John Byrne delivered his finest work on the series with this long arc, culminating in the battle royale against the Imperial Guard and the tragic sacrifice of the Phoenix."

David Caballero of Screen Rant asserted, "The storyline remains influential and is one of the most referenced in American superhero comics. Thanks to excellent writing, compelling and flawed characters, inspired and often-imitated artwork, and consequences so extreme they reshaped the entire franchise, The Dark Phoenix Saga remains a watershed moment in pop culture." Will Friedwald of Vanity Fair called "The Dark Phoenix Saga" one of the "classic comic book story arcs that everybody has heard of, even if they haven't read it," saying, "It's no wonder the Dark Saga has inspired so many imitators. It took the big issues of cosmic narrative—even the very nature of existence—and stretched them as far as they would go. It cast a long shadow; later milestone sagas would have to look in a new direction—inward—to examine the meaning of the medium and the inner nature of heroes and villains themselves." Chase Magnett of ComicBook.com wrote, "The reason why the characters and subplots surrounding "The Dark Phoenix Saga" remain so flexible is that the core themes of the story are what continue to resonate after almost four decades. [...] We understand that corruption, power, and monstrosity are truly evergreen themes in literature, not just superhero comics. They serve as the basis for the critical darling Immortal Hulk today. Few superhero stories, if any, have addressed these ideas as well as "The Dark Phoenix Saga" though."

Literary scholar Ramzi Fawaz interprets the story as an indictment of the fall of feminist liberation into a narcissistic personality. While he reads the earlier stories of the Phoenix force as presenting a potential alliance between projects of liberation for white women (represented by Jean Grey) and for Black women (represented by Storm), the Dark Phoenix Saga depicts a pessimistic conclusion that retreats into traditional humanist ideas of self-sacrifice.

==== Cover ====
David Caballero of Screen Rant included the cover of Uncanny X-Men #136 (August 1980) in their "X-Men: The 10 Most Iconic Covers Of All Time" list. Anthony Orlando of BuzzFeed ranked the cover of Uncanny X-Men #135 (July 1980) 8th in their "15 Greatest Covers In All Of Comics" list.

=== Impact ===
- Redfox #5-10 (September 1986 - July 1987) are officially titled "The Demon Queen Saga," and the plot is essentially the Dark Phoenix Saga translated to a sword-and-sorcery setting.
- Army Surplus Komikz #5 (1986) had Cutey Bunny transformed into Dark Cutey due to her magic amulet interacting with Wunner Bunny's magic lasso and other forces. Once transformed she tempts her former friends with the merchandising potential of being "dark" and finally engages in a pie fight with some incompetent super-heroes from WWII.
- Southern Knights #30 (December 1988) opens with a four-page parody of the Dark Phoenix Saga, with the character Connie Ronnin wreaking havoc as "Dark Connie."
- Power Pachyderms (one-shot, May 1989) had 4 anthropomorphic elephants (born to circus elephants irradiated by a gamma bomb detonation). They are takes on Cyclops (Trunklops), Wolverine (Rumbo), and Colossus (Mammoth), whereas Electralux parodied Elektra. In a battle with Clarinetto and his New Musicians, she is buried in radioactive make-up and becomes Rogue Elephant whose song can destroy anything. Her teammates succeed in blowing the make-up off her to return her to herself.
- The sixth season of Buffy the Vampire Slayer (2002) features the character of Willow Rosenberg transforming into "Dark Willow" in a story heavily inspired by the Dark Phoenix Saga. The character of Andrew Wells explicitly compares Willow to Phoenix.
- One panel featuring the destruction of the D'Bari system is replicated in the DC/Hanna-Barbera crossover Superman/Top Cat Special (October 2018). This is employed as an ironic twist, since it coincides with the relocation of an alien - the last survivor of his species - to D'Bari by Superman to give him a new, peaceful home.

== Sequel ==
Uncanny X-Men #168 (April 1983) began a subplot which culminated with the apparent reincarnation of Dark Phoenix in Uncanny X-Men #174–175 (October–November 1983). These issues were later collected in trade paperback form under the title From the Ashes.

The story revolves around Cyclops and the newly introduced Madelyne Pryor, a commercial airline pilot who is not only physically identical to Jean Grey, but survived a traumatic airliner crash at exactly the same moment that Jean died. Pryor's transformation into Dark Phoenix is revealed to be an illusion by Mastermind, seeking revenge for what Jean Grey did to him during the Dark Phoenix Saga. In issue #175, Cyclops and Madelyne repeat the dialogue he exchanged with Jean Grey after Professor X locked away her Dark Phoenix powers, marking the parallel with the dissolving of Mastermind's Dark Phoenix illusion.

== Collected editions ==
The story (issues #129–137) was first collected as a trade paperback in 1984. The first edition featured a cover painting by Bill Sienkiewicz.

To celebrate the 30th anniversary of the Phoenix Saga, the storyline was reprinted in an oversized trim hardcover. The X-Men: The Dark Phoenix Saga hardcover (352 pages, July 2010, Marvel, ISBN 978-0-7851-4913-2) collects The X-Men #129–138, Classic X-Men #43, Bizarre Adventures #27, Phoenix: The Untold Story (one-shot), and What If? #27.

The story (The X-Men #129–137) has been collected into a number of trade paperbacks:

- X-Men Legends, Volume 2: Dark Phoenix Saga (192 pages, August 1990, Marvel, ISBN 0-7851-1147-6)
- X-Men: The Dark Phoenix Saga (200 pages, April 2006, Marvel, ISBN 0-7851-2213-3)

The story is also included in Essential X-Men, Volume 2 (584 pages, October 1997, Panini Comics, ISBN 978-0-7851-0298-4), part of Marvel's Essential series of black-and-white trade paperbacks. The volume collects The X-Men #120–144 and The X-Men Annual #3–4.

The story is included in the hardcover Marvel Masterworks: Uncanny X-Men, Volume 4 (The X-Men #122–131, Annual #3) and Volume 5 (The X-Men #132–140, Annual #4)

The opening of the story is in the final pages of Uncanny X-Men Omnibus, Volume 1, which includes Giant-Size Uncanny X-Men #1, The X-Men Annual #3, and The X-Men #94–131; it concludes in Uncanny X-Men Omnibus Volume 2, which continues through issue #153 and also includes Annual #4–5, Avengers Annual #10, Marvel Fanfare #1–4, Marvel Treasury Edition #26–27, Marvel Team-Up #100, Bizarre Adventures #27, and Phoenix: The Untold Story.

The saga was printed in hardback form for issue 2 of The Official Marvel Graphic Novel Collection, a graphic novel series based in the United Kingdom, Ireland, Australia, New Zealand and South Africa, in January 2012.

Another omnibus edition, X-Men: Dark Phoenix Saga Omnibus, was published in August 2018, and included Uncanny X-Men #97–105, 107–108, 125–138, Bizarre Adventures #27, Phoenix: The Untold Story, What If? #27, and material from Classic X-Men #6, 8, 13, 18, 24, 43 (688 pages, ISBN 978-1302912123)

The "Dark Phoenix Saga" was again published in its entirety, Uncanny X-Men #129-138, along with various other issues, including Phoenix: The Untold Story, in X-Men Epic Collection Vol. 7: The Fate of the Phoenix in March 2021.

== In other media ==
=== Television ===
- The Dark Phoenix Saga, along with the Phoenix Saga, is adapted in X-Men: The Animated Series. During the five-part Phoenix Saga, the X-Men had to help the Shi'ar fight Lilandra Neramani's deranged brother, D'Ken. Jean Grey's psionic powers of telekinesis, empathy and telepathy manifest to incalculable power-levels during the four-part Dark Phoenix saga, turning her against her comrades. The X-Men, with the help of the Shi'ar, succeed in making the Dark Phoenix learn the error of her ways, resulting in it leaving Jean's body to parts unknown.
- The Dark Phoenix Saga is alluded to in the X-Men: Evolution finale episode "Ascension", where Professor X witnesses Jean Grey transform into the Dark Phoenix after being given a vision of the future while under Apocalypse's control. The Dark Phoenix Saga would have been adapted in the series' fifth season, which went unproduced.
- The Dark Phoenix Saga is adapted in the Wolverine and the X-Men finale episode "Foresight". After Cyclops is captured by the Hellfire Club, Selene reveals to him that Emma Frost had triggered Jean's dormant Phoenix abilities when the Xavier Institute was destroyed. After battling Magneto and a group of Sentinels, Jean unleashes the Phoenix Force. Frost absorbs the Phoenix Force into her body, seemingly killing her in the process.

=== Film ===
- The Dark Phoenix Saga is alluded to in X2 (2003). As Jean Grey's powers expand, a flash can occasionally be seen in her eyes. After Jean supposedly dies while protecting her teammates from drowning, an image of a phoenix is seen on the surface of Alkali Lake.
- The plot of X-Men: The Last Stand (2006) contains elements of "The Dark Phoenix Saga". In this version, the Phoenix is a dual personality of Jean, which Professor X had telepathically repressed during her childhood, fearing its destructive potential. It is awakened after Jean cocoons herself in telekinetic energy to survive the collapse of Alkali Lake. The Phoenix behaves irresponsibly, has no control over her decision-making, exposes her sexual desires for Wolverine, sides with Magneto and even murders Professor X and Cyclops. The Phoenix is destroyed when Jean is killed by Wolverine.
- The Dark Phoenix Saga is alluded to in X-Men: Apocalypse (2016). In the final battle against Apocalypse, Professor X encourages Jean to use the full extent of her abilities to defeat Apocalypse. As Jean unleashes her powers, she is engulfed in an aura of flames in the shape of a phoenix.
- Prior to the release of X-Men: Apocalypse, Simon Kinberg talked about adapting the Dark Phoenix Saga story line in a future X-Men film. The 2019 X-Men film is titled Dark Phoenix and was released on June 7, 2019.

=== Novels ===
- X-Men: The Dark Phoenix Saga received a prose novelization in mid-2019 written by Stuart Moore to coincide with the release of the Dark Phoenix film.
