= Eagle Awards =

Series of British comic book awards

- Eagle Awards logo from c. 2012. It uses the same image from the UK's Eagle comic, modeled on the top of a large brass inkwell owned by Marcus Morris, the comic's founder.
- Awarded for: British-based awards for comic book creators, titles, and characters
- Sponsored by: Mike Conroy (1977–1990, 2000–2014); Cassandra Conroy (2008–2014)
- Location: British Comic Art Convention (1977–1979, 1981); Marvel Comics Film & Fantasy Convention (1980); London Comic Mart (1983); Birmingham Comic Art Show (1984, 1986); UKCAC (1987–1990); Comic Festival (2000, 2002); Comic Expo (2004, 2006–2008); London MCM Expo (2010–2012); London Film and Comic Con (2014)
- Country: United Kingdom
- Hosted by: Paul Gambaccini (1990); Simon Pegg (2000); Norman Lovett (2007); Fraser Ayres (2008); Billy West (2011); Anthony Stewart Head (2014)
- Formerly called: MCM Awards; The Stan Lee Eagle Award; True Believer Comic Awards (2014)
- First award: 1977
- Final award: 2014
- Website: EagleAwards.co.uk _{(defunct)}

The Eagle Awards were a series of British awards for comic book titles and creators. They were awarded by UK fans voting for work produced during the previous year. Named after the UK's seminal boys' comic Eagle, the awards were launched in 1977 for comics released in 1976.

"[S]et up and financed by a group of dealers and fanzine editors" with the intention of including "people with... diverse interests... to make the poll as impartial as possible," the Eagles were described as "the first independent [in the UK], nationally organised comic art awards poll." The hope was that the Eagle Awards would "become a regular annual fandom event," and indeed, they were the preeminent British comics award in the 1980s and the 2000s (being mostly dormant in the 1990s), variously described as the country's comics equivalent of the Oscars or the BAFTAs. The Eagle Awards were usually presented in a ceremony at a British comic book convention; venues over the years included the British Comic Art Convention, UKCAC, Comic Festival, Comic Expo, and the London MCM Expo. Hosts for the ceremonies included such notables as Simon Pegg, Norman Lovett, Fraser Ayres, Billy West, and Anthony Stewart Head.

Initially the Eagle Award itself was a certificate; eventually the award became an engraved trophy.

Notable repeat Eagle Award winners included Alan Moore, who won the Favourite Comicbook Writer award an impressive eleven times (including sweeping the U.K. and U.S. categories in the period 1985–1987); Terry Austin, who won the Favourite Inker award nine times; Alex Ross, who won the Favourite Comics Artist (Fully Painted Artwork) seven times in ten possible years; and Laura DePuy Martin, who won the Favourite Colourist award six straight times. 2000 AD won the Favourite (Colour) Comic award 12 times, while The Walking Dead won Favourite Black & White Comicbook seven straight times. Batman was voted Favourite Comicbook Character 12 times and Judge Dredd won the award seven times; while the X-Men dominated the Favourite Comicbook Group or Team category, winning it eight times in the span of 11 years. Wolverine won the Favourite Comicbook Character category three times, the Favourite Supporting Character award three times, and the Character Most Worthy of Own Title twice.

In 2014, in connection with Stan Lee, the Eagle Awards were renamed, and presented as, the True Believer Comic Awards. They have not returned since then.

== History ==
=== 1977: conception and debut ===
Original Eagle Award logo

The Eagle Awards were set up by prominent British comics enthusiasts Mike Conroy, Nick Landau, Colin Campbell, Phil Clarke, and Richard Burton. Because the Eagle logo was perceived (as described by Burton) as "a standard of quality ... seldom reached" in early 1977, the Eagle Awards were named "with official blessing from IPC" (Eagle's former publisher).

The Eagle Awards were launched at the British Comic Art Convention, the earliest British fan convention devoted entirely to comics (and usually known by the moniker Comicon). The first awards ceremony was held on 3 September 1977 at the Bloomsbury Centre Hotel, London. The 1978 and 1979 awards were also presented at the British Comic Art Convention. Almost from the beginning, the awards included separate UK and US sections.

=== The 1980s: a Golden Age ===
The 1980 Eagle Awards (for comics published in 1979) were sponsored by Burton, Conroy, Colin Campbell, Dark They Were and Golden Eyed, Steve Dillon, Forbidden Planet, Forever People, Nostalgia & Comics, Bob Smart, and Valhalla Books; and organised by Burton and Conroy. The 1981 edition was again organised by Burton and Conroy, and sponsored by Burton, Conroy, Colin Campbell, Forbidden Planet, Nostalgia & Comics, Bob Smart, and Comics Showcase. Marvel's X-Men comic and creators dominated the 1981 Eagles, winning Favourite Comic Book, Artist (John Byrne), Writer (Chris Claremont), Inker (Terry Austin), Character (Wolverine), Single Comic Book Story (X-Men #137, "The Fate of the Phoenix"), Continued Comic Book Story ("The Dark Phoenix Saga," X-Men #135–137), and Cover (X-Men #136, by Byrne and Austin). The 1981 awards were organised by Burton and Conroy, and sponsored by Burton, Conroy, Colin Campbell, Bob Smart, and four UK comics retailers: Forbidden Planet, Forever People, Nostalgia & Comics, and Comics Showcase.

After a hiatus in 1982, the Eagle Awards returned in 1983, presented at the London Comic Mart by Alan Moore and Dave Gibbons.

The 1984 Eagle Award nominations were announced in May with Howard Chaykin's American Flagg! dominating the nominations – Favourite Penciler, Inker, Writer, Comic, Character (Reuben Flagg), Supporting Character (Raul the cat), New Comic, Single or Continued Story, and two nominations for Favourite Cover – and winning seven of them. The 1984 awards presentation was at the Birmingham Comic Art Show.

By the mid-1980s the work of British authors often dominated both the UK and US categories. In 1985 Alan Moore won favorite writer in both categories, and in 1986 (presented on 1 June at the Birmingham Comic Art Show), the awards "proved to be a virtual clean sweep ... by Alan Moore," who not only again won "favourite writer in both the US and UK categories," but had his work win for favourite comic book, supporting character and new title in the US, and character, continuing story and "character worthy of own title" in the UK (in which last category his works held all top three spots).

The awards became almost fully annual in 1987, in conjunction with the United Kingdom Comic Art Convention (UKCAC); they were held at the UKCAC in 1987, 1988, and 1990.

=== The 1990s: a fallow period ===
The Eagle Awards went dormant during most of the 1990s, as organizer Mike Conroy focused on his freelance writing (including becoming an editor of Comics International). From 1990 to 1997, the Eagles were replaced by the UK Comic Art Awards, and then from 1997 until 2003 (with the exception of the year 2000) were supplanted by the National Comics Awards.

=== The 2000s: a return to (hesitant) prominence ===
In 2000, on the 50th anniversary of the birth of Eagle, the Eagle Awards returned. The ceremony was held on 22 April 2000, at the Bristol Comic Festival (known as "Comics 2000"); this time MC'd by actor/comedian Simon Pegg. There were no Eagle Awards distributed in 2001; voting for comics published in 2000 ended in October 2001 and the winners were announced in June 2002 (at the Comic Festival, which had replaced UKCAC), so news reports announced these variously as the 2000, 2001, or 2002 Eagle Awards. The Eagles again went dormant in 2003 (replaced by the National Comics Awards).

The Eagle Awards returned in 2004 (sponsored by the retailer Ace Comics) and were presented at the inaugural Comic Expo, held on 6–7 November at the Ramada City Inn in Bristol; the Eagles were again not presented in 2005.

The 2006–2008 awards presentations were held at the Comic Expo in Bristol, with the 2008 awards being notable for accusations of ballot-stuffing.

Management of the Eagle Awards was transferred from co-founder Mike Conroy to his teenage daughter Cassandra Conroy in 2009 (although Mike Conroy stayed on as advisor). The previous years' venue the Bristol Comic Expo scaled back that year, and was not available for the evening awards ceremony. After attempting to go forward with the Eagle Awards as an online-only process, the Conroys were forced to cancel the 2009 awards due to a "lack of nominations."

=== 2010–2014: rifts, name changes, and demise ===
The 2010–2012 awards were presented at the London MCM Expo. At the 2012 awards it was announced that the award would in future be called the MCM Award. The announcement prompted a public rift between MCM and the Conroys; as a result no Eagles were awarded in 2013.

The Conroys decided to continue the awards separate from MCM, and in April 2014 it was announced that the award would be presented at the London Film and Comic Con (LFCC) and be named The Stan Lee Eagle Award, with the backing of Stan Lee in his last European convention appearance. In June 2014, however, it was announced that the new award would be called the True Believer Comic Awards. The inaugural True Believer Comics Awards were presented on 12 July 2014 at the LFCC, with host Anthony Stewart Head and a special appearance by Stan Lee. They have not been awarded since.

== Dates and locations ==
Year	Date	Convention	City	Venue	Presenter/Host	Notes
1977	3 Sept	Comicon '77	London	Bloomsbury Centre Hotel		First annual presentation
1978	29 July	Comicon '78	London	Bloomsbury Centre Hotel		Presentation held in the Park Room
1979	1 Sept	Comicon '79	Birmingham	Hotel Metropole, National Exhibition Centre		
1980	18 Oct	Marvel Comics Film & Fantasy Convention	London	Lawrence Hall		Source:
1981	1 Nov	Comicon '81	London	Regent Centre Hotel		Source:
1982	NO AWARDS PRESENTED					
1983	15 Oct	London Comic Mart	Westminster	Central Hall Westminster	Alan Moore and Dave Gibbons	
1984	2 June	Birmingham Comic Art Show	Birmingham	Midlands Arts Centre	Walt Simonson	
1985						
1986	1 June	Birmingham Comic Art Show	Birmingham	National Motorcycle Museum		
1987	5 Sept	United Kingdom Comic Art Convention (UKCAC)	London	UCL Institute of Education		
1988	24 Sept	UKCAC	London	Logan Hall, UCL Institute of Education		
1989	NO AWARDS PRESENTED					
1990	23 Sept	UKCAC	London	UCL Institute of Education	Paul Gambaccini and Dave Gibbons	
1991	NO AWARDS PRESENTED; replaced by the UK Comic Art Awards					
1992	NO AWARDS PRESENTED; replaced by the UK Comic Art Awards					
1993	NO AWARDS PRESENTED; replaced by the UK Comic Art Awards					
1994	NO AWARDS PRESENTED; replaced by the UK Comic Art Awards					
1995	NO AWARDS PRESENTED; replaced by the UK Comic Art Awards					
1996	NO AWARDS PRESENTED; replaced by the UK Comic Art Awards					
1997						
1998	NO AWARDS PRESENTED					
1999	NO AWARDS PRESENTED; replaced by the National Comics Awards					
2000	22 Apr	Comic Festival ("Comics 2000")	Bristol	Jurys Bristol Hotel	Simon Pegg	50th anniversary of the birth of the Eagle
2001	NO AWARDS PRESENTED; again replaced by the National Comics Awards					
2002	1 June	Comic Festival	Bristol	British Empire and Commonwealth Museum, Temple Quay		Known variously as the 2000, 2001, or 2002 Eagle Awards
2003	NO AWARDS PRESENTED; again replaced by (the final edition of) the National Comics Awards					
2004	6 Nov	Comic Expo	Bristol	Ramada City Inn		
2005	NO AWARDS PRESENTED					
2006	13 May	Comic Expo	Bristol	British Empire & Commonwealth Exhibition Hall/Ramada Plaza Hotel		
2007	12 May	Comic Expo	Bristol	British Empire & Commonwealth Exhibition Hall/Ramada Plaza Hotel	Norman Lovett	John M. Burns given the Eagle Awards 30th Anniversary Award for Outstanding Achievements in British Comics
2008	10 May	Comic Expo	Bristol	British Empire & Commonwealth Exhibition Hall/Ramada Plaza Hotel	Fraser Ayres	
2009	NO AWARDS PRESENTED					
2010	29 Oct	London MCM Expo	London	ExCeL London		
2011	27 May	London MCM Expo	London	One Western Gateway, Royal Victoria Dock, London Docklands	Billy West	
2012	25 May	London MCM Expo	London	One Western Gateway, Royal Victoria Dock		Final Eagle Awards under that name
2013	NO AWARDS PRESENTED					
2014	12 July	London Film and Comic Con	London	Earls Court 2	Anthony Head	first (and only) presentation of the True Believer Comic Awards; special appearance by Stan Lee

== Nominations and voting ==
At the outset of the Eagle Award, ballots were made available to "most dealers, shops and fanzines." The initial method of casting votes was designed to be inclusive and straightforward, with completed forms able to be returned to the same place, rather than a centralised location. An initial ballot formed a list of nominees, from which the voting ballot was created and disseminated in the same manner.

The awards for 1983 used an open voting system, with no pre-selected nominees. In 1984, the Eagles introduced a new nomination system composed of "prominent British fans, publishers, dealers, and artists," which put forward three names in each category.

The 1986 Eagles saw the introduction of a "free vote . . . rather than pre-selected nominees," creating a "fairer reflection of fans' opinions – and some anomalous results, especially in the Roll of Honor category."

The 2004 awards saw online voting for the first time; over 13,000 voting forms were "received via post, email and website counting centres."

For the 2007 awards, nominations were made by the general comics-reading public via the Eagle Awards website; the five most popular became nominees for the awards.

== Categories ==
Over the course of their existence, the Eagle Awards were eventually awarded in more than 30 categories.

The first ballot had nominations in 19 categories:

1. Favourite Comicbook Artist
2. Favourite British Comics Artist
3. Favourite Comicbook Writer – U.S.
4. Favourite British Comics Writer
5. Favourite Comicbook – Dramatic
6. Favourite Comicbook – Humour
7. Favourite Dramatic Black & White Comics Magazine
8. Favourite Black & White Comicbook – Humour
9. Favourite Comic Publication All Time
10. Favourite Comicbook Character
11. Favourite British Comic Character
12. Favourite Comicbook Team
13. Favourite New Comic Title
14. Favourite Single Comicbook Story
15. Favourite Continued Comic Story
16. Favorite Professional British Comic Publication
17. Favourite British Fan Publication
18. Favourite British Fan Personality
19. Favourite Comics Creator All Time

The next year's ballot, 1978, had 21 categories, dropping Favourite British Fan Personality and Favourite Comic Publication "All Time," and adding categories for Inker, Villain, and Supporting Character. The 1979 ballot dropped categories for Favourite Comic – Dramatic and Favourite Comic – Humour and added categories for Cover and Character Most Worthy of Own Title.

The nominations for Favourite Single Comicbook Story and Favorite Continued Comicbook Story were separate from 1977 to 1980 and then again from 2011 to 2014; they were merged as one category from 2000 to 2010. Similarly, the Favourite Cover category was only divided into British and American sections from 1984 to 1990.

Reflecting an interest in long-form comics, the Best Original Graphic Novel category was added in 1986. The Favourite Team category was dropped after 1990.

With the revival of the Eagles in 2000, categories for Favourite Writer and Favourite Artist were no longer separated into UK and US sections, and a host of new categories were added:

- Favourite Comics Artist – Fully Painted Artwork
- Favourite Colourist
- Favourite Comics Editor
- Favourite Black & White Comicbook
- Favourite British Small Press Title
- Favourite Trade Paperback/Reprint Collection
- Favourite Comic Strip/Newspaper Strip
- Favourite Comics-Based Movie or TV
- Favourite Comics Related Website
- Favourite Comics Related Website (fan-organised)
- Favourite Comics E-Zine

The Favourite Comics Related Website (Fan-Organized) category was dropped in 2002, but five more award categories were added:

- Favourite Comics Writer/Artist
- Favourite Manga Comic
- Favourite European Comic
- Favourite Comics-Related Book
- Favourite Web-based Comic

The 2004 Eagles dropped awards for the long-running categories Supporting Character and Character Most Worthy of Own Title, as well as the relatively new categories of British Small Press Title, Comic Strip/Newspaper Strip, and Comics E-Zine. It added a Favourite Letterer category as well as the one-off category Favourite Comics-Related Merchandise.

The 2006 Eagles saw the addition of a Favourite Publisher award, and the 2008 Eagle Awards added categories for Favourite Newcomer: Writer and Favourite Newcomer: Artist while dropping the long-running categories Favourite Character/Hero and Favourite Villain.

The final set of awards, in 2014, were given in 28 categories.

The following is a comprehensive list of the Eagle Award categories and the years they were presented, many of which were divided into British sections and (North) American sections. These categories included:

- Favourite Writer (1977–2014)
- Favourite Artist/Penciler (1977–2014)
- Favourite Comic/Colour Comicbook (1977–2014)
- Favourite Black & White Comicbook (2000–2014)
- Favourite New Title (1977–2014)
- Favourite Single or Continued Story (1977–2014) – divided into separate categories for Single and Continued 1977–1980, and 2011–2014
- Best Original Graphic Novel (1986–2014)
- Favourite Comic Strip/Newspaper Strip (2000–2004)
- Favourite Cover (1979–2014)
- Favourite Character/Hero (1977–2008)
- Favourite Villain (1978–2008)
- Favourite Supporting Character (1978–2004)
- Character Most Worthy of Own Title (1979–2004)
- Favourite Specialist Comics Publication/Magazine About Comics (1977–2014)

General categories not divided into U.K. and U.S. sections were:

- Favourite Comics Writer/Artist (2002–2012)
- Favourite Inker (1978–2014)
- Favourite Comics Artist – Fully Painted Artwork (2000–2014)
- Favourite Colourist (2000–2014)
- Favourite Comics Letterer (2004–2014)
- Favourite Comics Editor (2000–2014)
- Favourite Publisher (2006–2014)
- Favourite Newcomer (1997)
- Favourite Newcomer: Writer (2008–2014)
- Favourite Newcomer: Artist (2008–2014)
- Favourite Comic: Dramatic (1977–1978)
- Favourite Comic: Humour (1977–1978)
- Favourite Black & White Comicbook - Humour (1977–1980)
- Favourite Comics Magazine (1977–1980)
- Favourite British Small Press Title (2000–2004) – specific to the U.K.
- Favourite Manga Comic (2002–2014)
- Favourite European Comic (2002–2014)
- Favourite Team (1977–1990) – divided into U.K./U.S. in 1985 only
- Favourite Trade Paperback/Reprint Collection (2000–2014)
- Favourite Comics-Related Book (2002–2014)
- Favourite Comics-Based Movie or TV (2000–2014)
- Favourite Comics Related Website (2000–2014)
- Favourite Comics E-Zine (2000–2004)
- Favourite Web-based Comic (2002–2014)
- Roll of Honour (1977–2014) – originally called "Favourite Comics Creator All Time"

Finally, there were a few one-off awards:

- Favourite British Fan Personality (1977)
- Favourite Comic Excluding North American and UK titles (2000) – became separate awards for Favourite Manga and Favourite European Comic
- Favourite Comics Related Website (fan-organised) (2000)
- Favourite Comics-Related Merchandise (2004)
- 30th Anniversary Award for Outstanding Achievements in British Comics (2006)

== Past winners ==
Listed by year presented

=== People ===
==== Favourite Comicbook Writer ====
Alan Moore won this award an impressive eleven times (including sweeping the U.K. and U.S. categories in the period 1985–1987), with Chris Claremont winning it four times (all in the span 1977–1981).

- 1977
  - U.K.: Chris Claremont
  - U.S.: Roy Thomas
- 1978
  - U.K.: Martin Lock
  - U.S.: Steve Englehart
- 1979
  - U.K.: T.B. Grover (pseudonym of John Wagner)
  - U.S.: Chris Claremont
- 1980
  - U.K.: John Howard
  - U.S.: Chris Claremont
- 1981
  - U.K.: T.B. Grover
  - U.S. Chris Claremont
- 1983
  - U.K.: Alan Moore
  - U.S.: Frank Miller
- 1984
  - U.K.: Pat Mills
  - U.S.: Howard Chaykin
- 1985 (U.K. and U.S.) Alan Moore
- 1986 (U.K. and U.S.) Alan Moore
- 1987 (U.K. and U.S.) Alan Moore
- 1988
  - U.K.: Pat Mills
  - U.S.: Alan Moore
- 1989
  - U.S.: Neil Gaiman (for The Sandman)
- 1990
  - U.K.: Grant Morrison
  - U.S.: Neil Gaiman, Sandman (DC)
- 2000 Alan Moore
- 2002 Alan Moore
- 2004 J. Michael Straczynski
- 2006 Grant Morrison
- 2007 Warren Ellis
- 2008 Alan Moore
- 2010 Warren Ellis
- 2011 Grant Morrison
- 2012 Scott Snyder
- 2014 Matt Fraction

==== Favourite Comics Writer/Artist ====
Mike Mignola won this award three times while Frank Miller won it twice.

- 2002 Frank Miller
- 2004 Mike Mignola
- 2006 Howard Chaykin
- 2007 Mike Mignola
- 2008 Alan Davis
- 2010 Darwyn Cooke
- 2011 Mike Mignola
- 2012 Frank Miller

==== Favourite Comicbook Artist/Penciler ====
Multiple winners of this award included John Byrne, Brian Bolland, and Alan Davis with three wins; and Neal Adams, John Bolton, George Pérez, Bill Sienkiewicz, Frank Miller, Brian Talbot, Frank Quitely, and J. H. Williams III with two awards apiece.

- 1977
  - U.K.: Frank Bellamy
  - U.S.: Neal Adams
- 1978
  - U.K.: John Bolton
  - U.S.: Neal Adams
- 1979
  - U.K.: John Bolton
  - U.S.: John Byrne
- 1980
  - U.K.: Brian Bolland
  - U.S.: John Byrne
- 1981
  - U.K.: Brian Bolland
  - U.S.: John Byrne
- 1983
  - U.K.: Brian Bolland
  - U.S.: Frank Miller
- 1984
  - U.S.: Howard Chaykin
- 1985
  - U.K.: Alan Davis
  - U.S. Bill Sienkiewicz
- 1986
  - U.K.: Alan Davis
  - U.S.: George Pérez
- 1987
  - U.K.: Alan Davis
  - U.S.: Frank Miller
- 1988
  - U.K.: Bryan Talbot
  - U.S.: Bill Sienkiewicz
- 1989
  - U.K.: Bryan Talbot (for The Adventures of Luther Arkwright)
- 1990
  - U.K.: Simon Bisley
  - U.S.: Todd McFarlane
- 2000 George Pérez
- 2002 Frank Quitely
- 2004 Jim Lee
- 2006 Bryan Hitch
- 2007 John Cassaday
- 2008 Frank Cho
- 2010 Frank Quitely
- 2011 J. H. Williams III
- 2012 J. H. Williams III
- 2014 Fiona Staples

==== Favourite Inker ====
Terry Austin won this award nine times in an eleven-year span (from 1978 to 1988).

- 1978 Terry Austin
- 1979 Terry Austin
- 1980:
  - U.K.: Brian Bolland (Note: "The award went to John Stokes in second place, as Brian Bolland did not feel he was eligible for it in 1979.")
  - U.S.: Terry Austin
- 1981 Terry Austin
- 1983 Terry Austin
- 1984 Howard Chaykin
- 1985 Terry Austin
- 1986 Terry Austin
- 1987 Terry Austin
- 1988 Terry Austin
- 1990 Paul Neary
- 2000 Jimmy Palmiotti
- 2002 Mark Farmer
- 2004 Scott Williams
- 2006 Jimmy Palmiotti
- 2007 Paul Neary
- 2008 D'Israeli (Matt Brooker)
- 2010 Kevin O'Neill
- 2011 Mike Mignola
- 2012 Scott Williams
- 2014 Becky Cloonan

==== Favourite Comics Artist (Fully Painted Artwork) ====
Alex Ross dominated this award, winning it seven times in 10 possible years.

- 2000 Alex Ross
- 2002 Alex Ross
- 2004 Alex Ross
- 2006 Alex Ross
- 2007 Alex Ross
- 2008 Alex Ross
- 2010 J. H. Williams III
- 2011 J. H. Williams III
- 2012 Alex Ross
- 2014 Fiona Staples

==== Favourite Colourist ====
Laura DePuy Martin won this award six straight times from 2000 to 2008.

- 2000 Laura DePuy
- 2002 Laura DePuy
- 2004 Laura Martin
- 2006 Laura Martin
- 2007 Laura Martin
- 2008 Laura Martin
- 2010 Ben Templesmith
- 2011 Dave Stewart
- 2012 Dave Stewart
- 2014 Matt Hollingsworth

==== Favourite Letterer ====
- 2006 Todd Klein
- 2007 Chris Eliopoulos
- 2008 Dave Gibbons
- 2010 Todd Klein
- 2011 Richard Starkings
- 2012 Richard Starkings/Comicraft
- 2014 Annie Parkhouse

==== Favourite Comics Editor ====
2000 AD's Tharg the Mighty won this award four times (with three of those awards going to Matt Smith); Axel Alonso also won the award three times.

- 2000 Dennis O'Neil
- 2002 Andy Diggle (Mighty Tharg: 2000 AD)
- 2004 Axel Alonso (Marvel Comics)
- 2006 Axel Alonso
- 2007 Matt Smith
- 2008 Tharg (Matt Smith)
- 2010 Axel Alonso
- 2011 Matt Smith/Tharg
- 2012 Karen Berger
- 2014 Chris Ryall

==== Best Newcomer ====
- 1997 Alex Ronald

==== Award for Favourite Newcomer Writer/Rising Star ====
- 2008 Matt Fraction
- 2010 Jonathan Hickman
- 2011 Paul Cornell
- 2012 Jeff Lemire
- 2014 Matt Fraction

==== Award for Favourite Newcomer Artist/Rising Star ====
- 1978 Marshall Rogers
- 2008 David Aja
- 2010 Jamie McKelvie
- 2011 Sara Pichelli
- 2012 Francesco Francavilla
- 2014 Fiona Staples

=== Works ===
==== Favourite (Colour) Comic ====
2000 AD was dominant in this category, winning 12 times; X-Men was in second place with six wins (five of them in the period 1977–1981).

- 1977 X-Men
- 1978 X-Men
- 1979
  - U.K.: 2000 AD
  - U.S.: X-Men
- 1980
  - U.K.: 2000 A.D.
  - U.S.: X-Men
- 1981
  - U.K.: 2000 AD
  - U.S.: X-Men
- 1983
  - U.K.: Warrior
  - U.S.: Daredevil
- 1984
  - U.K.: The Daredevils
  - U.S.: American Flagg!
- 1985
  - U.K.: Warrior, edited by Dez Skinn (Quality Communications)
  - U.S.: Swamp Thing
- 1986
  - U.K.: 2000 AD
  - U.S.: Swamp Thing
- 1987
  - U.K.: 2000 AD
  - U.S.: Watchmen
- 1988
  - U.K.: 2000 AD
  - U.S.: Watchmen
- 1990
  - U.K.: 2000 AD
  - U.S.: Uncanny X-Men
- 2000
  - U.K.: 2000 AD
  - U.S.: Preacher, by Garth Ennis and Steve Dillon
- 2002
  - U.K.: 2000 AD
  - U.S.: JSA
- 2004
  - U.K.: Warhammer Monthly (Black Library)
  - U.S.: Fantastic Four (Marvel Comics)
- 2006
  - U.K.: Judge Dredd Megazine (Rebellion)
  - U.S.: The Ultimates Volume 2 (Marvel Comics)
- 2007
  - U.K.: 2000 AD
  - U.S.: All-Star Superman
- 2008
  - U.K.: The Spectacular Spider-Man
  - U.S.: Hellboy: Darkness Calls
- 2010
  - U.K.: 2000 AD
  - U.S.: Batman and Robin
- 2011
  - U.K.: 2000 AD
  - U.S.: Batman and Robin
- 2012
  - U.K.: Doctor Who Magazine
  - U.S.: Batman
- 2014
  - U.K.: 2000 AD
  - U.S.: Saga

==== Favourite Comic Magazine ====
Savage Sword of Conan prevailed in this category three times in the five years it was awarded.

- 1977 Savage Sword of Conan
- 1978 Savage Sword of Conan
- 1979 Savage Sword of Conan
- 1980
  - U.K.: 2000 AD Summer Special
  - U.S.: Howard the Duck
- 1981 Epic Illustrated

==== Favourite Comicbook - Humour ====
- 1977 Howard the Duck
- 1978 Howard the Duck

==== Favourite Black & White Comicbook - Humour ====
- 1977 Mad magazine

==== Favourite Black & White Comicbook ====
The Walking Dead won this category seven straight times.

- 2000 Hell and Back (A Sin City Love Story), by Frank Miller
- 2002 Liberty Meadows, by Frank Cho
- 2004 Bone (Cartoon Books)
- 2006 The Walking Dead (Image Comics)
- 2007 The Walking Dead
- 2008 The Walking Dead
- 2010 The Walking Dead
- 2011 The Walking Dead
- 2012 The Walking Dead
- 2014 The Walking Dead

==== Favourite UK Small Press Title/Black and White Comicbook ====
- 2000 Kane by Paul Grist
- 2002 Jack Staff by Paul Grist (Dancing Elephant Press)
- 2004 Thrud the Barbarian (Carl Critchlow)
- 2006 Springheeled Jack (Black Boar Press)
- 2007 Hero Killers (Moonface Press)
- 2008 How to Date a Girl in Ten Days by Tom Humberstone
- 2010 Whatever Happened to The World's Fastest Man? by Dave West and Marleen Lowe
- 2011 Commando (D. C. Thomson & Co. Ltd)
- 2012 Viz (Dennis Publishing)
- 2014 Good Cop Bad Cop by Jim Alexander

==== Favourite Comic Album/Graphic Novel/Original Graphic Novel ====
- 1986
  - U.K.: Nemesis Book III by Pat Mills and Kevin O'Neill
  - U.S.: American Flagg!: Hard Times by Howard Chaykin
- 1987
  - U.K.: D.R. & Quinch's Totally Awesome Guide to Life by Alan Moore and Alan Davis
  - U.S.: Batman: The Dark Knight Returns by Frank Miller and Klaus Janson
- 1988
  - U.K.: Violent Cases by Neil Gaiman and Dave McKean
  - U.S.: Daredevil: Love and War by Frank Miller and Bill Sienkiewicz
- 1989 Violent Cases by Neil Gaiman and Dave McKean
- 1990
  - U.K.: Sláine: The Horned God Book I by Pat Mills and Simon Bisley
  - U.S.: Arkham Asylum: A Serious House on Serious Earth by Grant Morrison and Dave McKean
- 2000 JLA: Earth 2 by Grant Morrison and Frank Quitely
- 2002 Safe Area Goražde by Joe Sacco
- 2004 Sgt. Rock: Between Hell and a Hard Place by Brian Azzarello and Joe Kubert
- 2006 Top 10: The Forty-Niners by Alan Moore and Gene Ha
- 2007 Pride of Baghdad by Brian K. Vaughan and Niko Henrichon
- 2008 The League of Extraordinary Gentlemen: Black Dossier by Alan Moore and Kevin O'Neill
- 2010 The League of Extraordinary Gentlemen, Volume III: Century by Alan Moore and Kevin O'Neill
- 2011 Scott Pilgrim, Volume 6: Scott Pilgrim’s Finest Hour by Bryan Lee O'Malley
- 2012 Batman: Noël by Lee Bermejo
- 2014 Avengers: Endless Wartime by Warren Ellis, et al.

==== Favourite Trade Paperback/Reprint Collection ====
- 2000 From Hell: To Hell, by Alan Moore and Eddie Campbell
- 2002 The Authority: Under New Management by Warren Ellis and Bryan Hitch
- 2004 The Chronicles of Conan (Dark Horse)
- 2006 Absolute Watchmen by Alan Moore and Dave Gibbons
- 2007 Absolute Sandman Volume 1 by Neil Gaiman
- 2008 Absolute Sandman Volume 2 by Neil Gaiman
- 2010 Captain Britain by Alan Moore and Alan Davis Omnibus
- 2011 Absolute All-Star Superman by Grant Morrison and Frank Quitely
- 2012 Thor Omnibus by Walt Simonson
- 2014 Hawkeye Volume 1 Oversized HC by Matt Fraction, et al.

==== Favourite New Comic Title ====
- 1977 Howard the Duck
- 1978 John Carter, Warlord of Mars
- 1979 Micronauts
- 1980
  - U.K.: Doctor Who Weekly
  - U.S.: Howard the Duck
- 1981 The New Teen Titans
- 1983
  - U.K.: Warrior
  - U.S.: Camelot 3000
- 1984
  - U.S.: American Flagg!
- 1985
  - U.K.: Captain Britain
  - U.S.: Power Pack, written by Louise Simonson (Marvel Comics)
- 1986
  - U.K.: Captain Britain
  - U.S. Miracleman
- 1987
  - U.K.: Redfox
  - U.S.: Watchmen
- 1988
  - U.K.: The Adventures of Luther Arkwright
  - U.S.: Marshal Law
- 1989
  - U.K.: The Adventures of Luther Arkwright
- 1990
  - U.K.: The Bogie Man
  - U.S.: Batman: Legends of the Dark Knight
- 2000 Top 10, by Alan Moore and Gene Ha
- 2002 Ultimate Spider-Man
- 2004 Conan (Dark Horse)
- 2006 All-Star Superman (DC) by Grant Morrison and Frank Quitely
- 2007 Nextwave
- 2008 Thor
- 2010 Batman and Robin
- 2011 Daytripper
- 2012 Batman
- 2014 Guardians of the Galaxy

==== Favourite Single or Continued Comicbook Story ====
- 1977
  - Single: Howard the Duck #3: "Four Feathers of Death" (Steve Gerber/John Buscema)
  - Continued: Master of Kung Fu #48-51 (Doug Moench/Paul Gulacy)
- 1978
  - Single: Avengers Annual #7 – The Final Threat (Jim Starlin)
  - Continued: Avengers Annual #7/Marvel Two-in-One Annual #2 (Jim Starlin)
- 1979
  - Single: X-Men #111 – Mindgames (Chris Claremont/John Byrne)
  - Continued: The Avengers #167, 168, 170-177 (Jim Shooter/George Pérez, Sal Buscema, David Wenzel)
- 1980
  - U.K.:
    - Single: Hulk Weekly #2 (Night Raven)
    - Continued: Hulk Weekly 1–30, 42, 43 (Black Knight)
  - U.S.:
    - Single: Iron Man #128 – Demon in a Bottle (David Michelinie, Bob Layton/John Romita Jr.)
    - Continued: X-Men #125-128 (Chris Claremont/John Byrne)
- 1981
  - U.K.
    - Single: "Terror Tube," 2000 AD #167
    - Continued: "The Judge Child," 2000 AD #156–181
  - U.S.
    - Single: X-Men #137 "The Fate of the Phoenix"
    - Continued: X-Men #135–137, "The Dark Phoenix Saga"
- 1983
  - U.K.: Marvelman (Warrior #1-3, 5, & 6)
  - U.S.: Wolverine #1-4 (limited series)
- 1984
  - U.S.: American Flagg! #1–2, "Hard Times"
- 1985
  - U.K.: 2000 AD #355–359
  - U.S.: Superman #400
- 1986
  - U.K.: Halo Jones Book Two (2000 AD #406-415)
  - U.S.: Crisis on Infinite Earths #1-9
- 1987
  - U.K.: Halo Jones Book Three
  - U.S.: Batman: The Dark Knight Returns
- 1988
  - U.K.: Zenith (2000 AD #535-550)
  - U.S.: Batman #404-407: Year One
- 1990
  - U.K.: Sláine: The Horned God Book I (2000 AD #626-635)
  - U.S.: Skreemer (limited series)
- 2000 Daredevil (#1-8), by Kevin Smith and Joe Quesada
- 2002 The Authority: The Nativity
- 2004 Daredevil #46-50: Hardcore (Brian Michael Bendis & Alex Maleev)
- 2006 The Ultimates volume 2 #1-9 (Mark Millar, Bryan Hitch, and Paul Neary)
- 2007 Nextwave #1-6
- 2008 Captain America #25-30: The Death of Captain America
- 2010
  - Single: Phonogram: The Singles Club #4: "Konichiwa Bitches"
  - Continued: The Walking Dead #61-65: "Fear The Hunters"
- 2011
  - Single: Daytripper #8
  - Continued: The Walking Dead #73-79: "Too Far Gone"
- 2012
  - Single: Doctor Who #12
  - Continued: Walking Dead #79-84: "No Way Out"
- 2014
  - Single: "Pizza is my Business," Hawkeye #11
  - Continued: Saga

==== Favourite Cover ====
- 1979 Master of Kung Fu #67 (Paul Gulacy)
- 1980
  - U.K.: 2000 AD 144
  - U.S.: The Avengers #185 (George Pérez)
- 1981
  - U.K.: 2000 AD #173 (Brian Bolland)
  - U.S.: X-Men #136 (John Byrne/Terry Austin)
- 1983
  - U.K.: Warrior #7 (Mick Austin)
  - U.S.: Doctor Strange #55 (Michael Golden)
- 1985
  - U.K.: Warrior #19 (David Lloyd/Garry Leach)
  - U.S.: New Mutants #22 (Bill Sienkiewicz)
- 1986
  - U.K.: Captain Britain #6 (Alan Davis)
  - U.S.: Swamp Thing #34 (John Totleben)
- 1987
  - U.K.: 2000 AD #500 (multiple artists)
  - U.S.: Batman: The Dark Knight Returns #1 (Frank Miller/Klaus Janson)
- 1988
  - U.K.: The Adventures of Luther Arkwright #1 (Bryan Talbot)
  - U.S.: Wonder Woman #10 (George Pérez)
- 1989
  - U.K.: The Adventures of Luther Arkwright (Bryan Talbot)
- 1990
  - U.K.: 2000 AD Prog 626 (Simon Bisley)
  - U.S.: Aliens #1 (Denis Beauvais)
- 2000 Batman: Harley Quinn (Alex Ross)
- 2002 Ultimate Spider-Man #1 (Joe Quesada)
- 2004 JLA: Liberty and Justice (Alex Ross)
- 2006 All-Star Superman #1 (Frank Quitely)
- 2007 Fables: 1001 Nights of Snowfall (James Jean)
- 2008 World War Hulk 1A (David Finch)
- 2010 Batman and Robin #4 (Frank Quitely)
- 2011 Batwoman #0 (J.H. Williams III)
- 2012 Batwoman #1 (J.H. Williams III)
- 2014 Hawkeye #9 (David Aja)

==== Favourite Comic (excluding North American and UK titles) ====
- 1990 Akira (Japan)
- 2000 Bacchus, by Eddie Campbell (Australia)

==== Favourite Manga Comic ====
- 2002 Lone Wolf and Cub
- 2004 Blade of the Immortal (Dark Horse)
- 2006 Blade of the Immortal (Dark Horse)
- 2007 Blade of the Immortal
- 2008 Death Note
- 2010 Fullmetal Alchemist
- 2011 Fullmetal Alchemist
- 2012 20th Century Boys

==== Favourite European Comic ====
- 2002 Metabarons (Les Humanoïdes Associés, France)
- 2004 Tex (Sergio Bonelli Editore, Italy)
- 2006 Asterix and the Falling Sky (Albert Rene Editions, France)
- 2007 Asterix and the Vikings (France)
- 2008 Requiem, Vampire Knight (Nickel Editions, France)
- 2010 Requiem Chevalier Vampire (France)
- 2011 Blacksad (Dargaud, France)
- 2012 Dylan Dog (Sergio Bonelli Editore, Italy)

==== Favourite Newspaper Strip ====
- 2000 Peanuts
- 2002 Liberty Meadows
- 2004 Mutts (Patrick McDonnell)

==== Favourite Comic Strip in a UK Comic or Magazine ====
- 2000 Judge Dredd (2000 AD/Judge Dredd Megazine)
- 2002 Nikolai Dante (2000 AD)
- 2004 Judge Dredd (2000 AD/Judge Dredd Megazine – Rebellion)

==== Favourite Web-Based Comic ====
- 2000 Astounding Space Thrills by Steve Conley
- 2002 Sluggy Freelance by Pete Abrams
- 2004 PvP by Scott Kurtz
- 2006 Supernatural Law by Batton Lash
- 2007 Penny Arcade by Jerry Holkins and Mike Krahulik
- 2008 The Order of the Stick by Rich Burlew
- 2010 FreakAngels by Warren Ellis and Paul Duffield
- 2011 Axe Cop by Malachai Nicolle and Ethan Nicolle
- 2012 Freakangels
- 2014 Aces Weekly by David Lloyd, et al. (www.acesweekly.co.uk)

==== Favourite Publisher ====
- 2006 DC Comics
- 2007 Marvel Comics
- 2008 Marvel Comics
- 2010 DC Comics/Vertigo Comics
- 2011 DC Comics/Vertigo/WildStorm
- 2012 DC Comics/Vertigo
- 2014 IDW Publishing

=== Characters ===
==== Favourite Comicbook Character ====
Batman won this category 12 times; Judge Dredd won seven times, and Wolverine won it three times.

- 1977
  - U.K.: Captain Britain
  - U.S.: Conan the Barbarian
- 1978
  - U.K.: Judge Dredd
  - U.S.: Batman
- 1979
  - U.K.: Judge Dredd
  - U.S.: Batman
- 1980
  - U.K.: Judge Dredd
  - U.S.: Wolverine
- 1981
  - U.K.: Judge Dredd
  - U.S.: Wolverine
- 1983
  - U.K.: Marvelman
  - U.S.: Wolverine
- 1985
  - U.K.: Judge Dredd
  - U.S.: Reuben Flagg
- 1986
  - U.K.: Halo Jones
  - U.S.: Batman
- 1987
  - U.K.: Judge Dredd
  - U.S.: Batman
- 1988
  - U.K.: Luther Arkwright
  - U.S.: Batman
- 1989
  - U.K.: Luther Arkwright
- 1990
  - U.K.: Judge Dredd
  - U.S.: Batman
- 2000 Batman
- 2002 Batman
- 2004 Batman
- 2006 Batman
- 2007 Batman
- 2008 Batman

==== Favourite Villain ====
DC's The Joker won this category five times, 2000 AD's Torquemada won four times, and Marvel's Magneto came away with three wins.

- 1978 Thanos
- 1979 Magneto
- 1980
  - U.K.: Judge Cal
  - U.S.: Magneto
- 1981
  - U.K.: Judge Death
  - U.S.: Magneto
- 1983
  - U.K.: Kid Marvelman
  - U.S.: Darkseid
- 1985
  - U.K.: Torquemada, from Nemesis the Warlock (2000 AD), by Pat Mills and Brian Talbot (Fleetway)
  - U.S.: Doctor Doom
- 1986
  - U.K.: Torquemada
  - U.S.: Anti-Monitor
- 1987
  - U.K.: Torquemada
  - U.S.: The Joker
- 1988
  - U.K.: Torquemada
  - U.S.: The Joker
- 1990
  - U.K.: Judge Death
  - U.S.: The Joker
- 2000 Herr Starr (Preacher)
- 2002 Lex Luthor (Superman)
- 2004 Doctor Doom (Fantastic Four – Marvel Comics)
- 2006 The Joker
- 2007 Dirk Anger (Nextwave: Marvel Comics|)
- 2008 The Joker

==== Favourite Supporting Character ====
- 1978 Pip the Troll
- 1979 Wolverine
- 1980
  - U.K.: Ro-Jaws
  - U.S.: Wolverine
- 1981
  - U.K.: Hoagy (Robo-Hunter)
  - U.S.: Wolverine
- 1983
  - U.K.: Zirk (Warrior)
  - U.S.: Elektra
- 1984
  - U.S.: Raul the cat (American Flagg!)
- 1985
  - U.K.: Evey (V for Vendetta)
  - U.S.: Raul the cat (American Flagg!)
- 1986
  - U.K.: Meggan (Captain Britain)
  - U.S.: John Constantine (Swamp Thing)
- 1987
  - U.K.: Ukko the Dwarf (Sláine)
  - U.S.: John Constantine
- 1988
  - U.K.: Ukko the Dwarf
  - U.S.: Abigail Arcane Cable
- 1990
  - U.K.: Middenface McNulty (Strontium Dog)
- 2000 Oracle/Barbara Gordon (Batman/Birds of Prey)
- 2002 Commissioner James Gordon (Batman)
- 2004 Mary Jane Watson (Spider-Man – Marvel Comics)

==== Character Most Worthy of Own Title ====
- 1978 Silver Surfer
- 1979 Silver Surfer
- 1980
  - U.K.: Judge Dredd
  - U.S.: Warlock
- 1981
  - U.K.: Judge Dredd
  - U.S.: Silver Surfer
- 1983
  - U.K.: Judge Anderson
  - U.S.: The Spectre
- 1985
  - U.K.: D.R. & Quinch
  - U.S.: The Spectre
- 1986
  - U.K.: Halo Jones
  - U.S.: Wolverine
- 1987
  - U.K.: Captain Britain
  - U.S.: Wolverine
- 1988
  - U.K.: Halo Jones
  - U.S.: Rorschach
- 1990
  - U.K.: Captain Britain
- 2000 Luther Arkwright (Heart of Empire)
- 2002 Elijah Snow (Planetary)
- 2004 Doctor Strange (Marvel Comics)

==== Favourite Comicbook Group or Team ====
The X-Men dominated this category, winning it eight times in the span of 11 years.

- 1977 X-Men
- 1978 X-Men
- 1979 X-Men
- 1980
  - U.K.: Ro-Busters
  - U.S.: X-Men
- 1981 X-Men
- 1983 X-Men
- 1985
  - U.K.: Mega City Judges
  - U.S.: Teen Titans
- 1986 X-Men
- 1987 X-Men
- 1988 Justice League International
- 1990 Doom Patrol

=== Comics Press & Media ===
==== Favourite Specialist Comics Publication/Trade Publication ====
Multiple award-winners in this category included Wizard with six wins, Fantagraphics Books with its publications Amazing Heroes and The Comics Journal racking up seven wins in total, and the British publication Speakeasy with four wins.

- 1977
  - Pro: House of Hammer
  - Fan: Comic Media News
- 1978
  - Pro: Starburst
  - Fan: Comic Media News
- 1980
  - U.K. (fan): BEM
  - U.S. (fan): The Comics Journal
- 1981
  - U.K.: BEM
  - U.S.: The Comics Journal
- 1985
  - U.K.: Fantasy Advertiser
  - U.S.: Amazing Heroes
- 1986
  - U.K.: Speakeasy
  - U.S.: Amazing Heroes
- 1987
  - U.K.: Speakeasy
  - U.S.: Amazing Heroes
- 1988
  - U.K.: Speakeasy
  - U.S.: Amazing Heroes
- 1990
  - U.K.: Speakeasy
  - U.S.: Marvel Age
- 2000 Wizard
- 2002 Wizard
- 2004 The Comics Journal (Fantagraphics Books)
- 2006 The Comics Journal (Fantagraphics Books)
- 2007 Wizard
- 2008 Wizard
- 2010 Wizard
- 2011 Wizard
- 2012 DC Comics Super Hero Collection
- 2014 Bleeding Cool

==== Favourite Comics-Related Book ====
- 2002 The Amazing Adventures of Kavalier and Clay, by Michael Chabon
- 2004 Mythology: The DC Comics Art of Alex Ross by Chip Kidd with Geoff Spear
- 2006 Eisner/Miller (edited by Charles Brownstein & Diana Schutz)
- 2007 Making Comics: Storytelling Secrets of Comics, Manga and Graphic Novels by Scott McCloud (HarperCollins)
- 2008 Our Gods Wear Spandex by Christopher Knowles
- 2010 The Insider's Guide to Creating Comics and Graphic Novels by Andy Schmidt
- 2011 75 Years of DC Comics by Paul Levitz (Taschen)
- 2012 Supergods: Our World in the Age of the Superhero by Grant Morrison
- 2014 The Secret History of Marvel Comics: Jack Kirby and the Moonlighting Artists at Martin Goodman's Empire by Blake Bell and Michael J. Vassallo

==== Favourite Comics Related Website (professional) ====
Comic Book Resources was a repeat winner in this category, with five wins in 14 years.

- 2000 Comic Book Resources
- 2002 Comic Book Resources
- 2004 Comicon.com
- 2006 Silver Bullet Comic Books
- 2007 Newsarama
- 2008 Marvel.com
- 2010 Comic Book Resources
- 2011 Comic Book Resources
- 2012 Bleeding Cool
- 2014 Comic Book Resources

==== Favourite Comics Related Website (fan-organised) ====
- 2000 Sequential Tart

==== Favourite Comics E-Zine ====
- 2002 Comic Book Electronic Magazine
- 2004 Newsarama

==== Favourite Comics-based Film or TV Series ====
- 2000 Batman Beyond
- 2004 X2 (Bryan Singer, director)
- 2006 Batman Begins (Christopher Nolan, director)
- 2007 Heroes
- 2008 300
- 2010 Watchmen
- 2011 Scott Pilgrim vs. the World
- 2012 The Big Bang Theory
- 2014 Iron Man 3

==== Favourite British Fan Personality ====
- 1977 Martin Lock

==== Favourite Comics-Related Merchandise ====
- 2004 Kingdom Come action figures (DC Select; second series)

=== Special awards ===
==== Favourite Comic Publication "All Time" ====
- 1977 Fantastic Four

==== Roll of Honour ====
- 1977 Stan Lee
- 1978 Steve Englehart
- 1979 Jack Kirby
- 1980 Roy Thomas
- 1981 Jerry Siegel and Joe Shuster
- 1982 Mick Austin
- 1983 Will Eisner
- 1985 Steve Ditko
- 1986 Alan Moore
- 1987 Frank Miller
- 1988 Pat Mills
- 1990 2000 AD
- 2000 Gil Kane
- 2002 Joe Quesada
- 2004 Neil Gaiman
- 2006 Grant Morrison
- 2007 Warren Ellis
- 2008 Mike Mignola
- 2010 Brian Bolland
- 2011 Dave Gibbons
- 2012 Frank Quitely
- 2014 Gail Simone

== See also ==
- List of comics awards
- Alley Award
- Bill Finger Award
- Eisner Awards
- Harvey Awards
- Inkpot Award
- Kirby Awards
- National Comics Awards
- Russ Manning Award
- Shazam Awards
