= Martin Lock =

British comic book critic, writer, and publisher

- Born: c. 1950 (age 75–76) UK
- Areas: Writer, Publisher
- Notable works: BEM (Bemusing Magazine); Fantasy Advertiser; Harrier Comics
- Awards: Eagle Award (1977, 1978, 1980, 1981)

Martin Lock (born c. 1950 in the United Kingdom) is a British comic book critic, writer, and publisher. As publisher of the fanzines BEM and Fantasy Advertiser, and then publisher of Harrier Comics, he was an important figure in British comics fandom in the 1970s and 1980s.

All during his publishing career, Lock had a day job in the sales department of a company in the chemical industry, the income from which helped finance his printing bills. When his employer moved its offices from London to Worcester in the late 1970s, Lock relocated as well. By the time he started Harrier in the mid-1980s, he had returned to London, settling in Northwood, Middlesex.

== Fanzines ==
Growing up as a comics enthusiast in the U.K., Lock became a reader of, and eventual a contributor to, British comics fanzines like Nick Landau & Richard Burton's Comic Media properties and Alan Austin's Fantasy Unlimited (later known as Comics Unlimited). He also worked as an editor for a time on Mark Ellis' fanzine Fantasy Trader.

=== BEM ===
In November 1973, Lock launched his own comics fanzine, Bemusing Magazine (later known as BEM). Billed as "The Comics News Fanzine," the fanzine featured industry news and gossip, interviews, comic reviews, essays, columns, and comic strips. Early issues of Bemusing Magazine were sold to customers waiting outside the frequent comic marts held in London, as well as the annual edition of the British Comic Art Convention ("Comicon").

One of Bemusing Magazine's key features was its publication of U.S.-based comics industry news that Lock acquired from the long-running American fanzine The Comic Reader (TCR). BEM was generally published on alternate months of Burton's Comic Media News, which also used TCR news, thus providing a dose of monthly comic industry news for readers of both publications. (Lock served as features editor for Comic Media News from 1973 to 1977, even after he launched BEM.)

BEM was also famed for its lengthy letters pages, Reaction. Lock became a member of the British Amateur Press Association, which was formed in 1977 in part due to a letter published in Reaction.

As time went, the fanzine also became more of a "strip-zine," with original comics content — some of it written by Lock — increasing year by year. Notable contributors over the years to BEM included Brian Bolland, Mike McMahon, Bryan Talbot, and Dave Gibbons.

By the late 1970s BEM had become the UK's leading comics zine; Lock's efforts with led to him winning two Eagle Awards — the 1977 Eagle for Favourite British Fan Personality and the 1978 Eagle for Favourite British Writer. (Lock was also nominated for the 1977 Eagle for Favourite British Comics Writer.) BEM was thrice nominated for the Eagle Award for Favourite Fan Publication, winning the award in 1980 and 1981.

BEM was acquired by the U.S.-based New Media Publishing (NMP) in 1981, ostensibly to distribute BEM in the U.S. and widen its readership. But production delays and the emphasis on British comics prevented the magazine from gaining a foothold. NMP produced only two issues before BEM faded away. In the end, BEM publishes 36 issues from 1973 to 1982.

=== Fantasy Advertiser ===
Quickly pivoting, Lock revived Fantasy Advertiser, a popular British fanzine dating back to 1965 which had been dormant for a years. He edited Fantasy Advertiser from 1981 to 1985, putting out 20 issues before handing over the editorial reins to Martin Skidmore, in order for Lock to focus on his next venture, Harrier Comics.

== Harrier Comics ==
From 1984 to 1989, Lock ran Harrier Publishing, popularly known as Harrier Comics. The success of Kevin Eastman and Peter Laird's Teenage Mutant Ninja Turtles led to a short-lived explosion of black-and-white independent comics in the United States in the mid-1980s. Harrier's titles followed the same mold, unlike most British comics publishers, who favored the comic magazine format. Lock himself wrote the company's first few titles, Conqueror and Swiftsure. (Conqueror traced its roots back to 1979, when Lock and artist Dave Harwood created the first stories for BEM.)

A number of top UK comics professional gave their support to Harrier by contributing covers and introductions to the company's various titles. Harrier's alternative comics imprint, New Wave, featured a number of notable creators, including Eddie Campbell, Phil Elliott, Glenn Dakin, Paul Grist, Ed Hillyer, Rian Hughes, Trevs Phoenix, and Warren Pleece.

By the spring of 1989, low sales forced Harrier to shut down. During Harrier's short existence, the company published more than 120 issues of over 30 titles.

== Awards ==
- 1977 Eagle Award for Favourite British Fan Personality
- 1977 (nomination) Eagle Award for Favourite British Comics Writer
- 1978 Eagle Award for Favourite British Writer
- 1978 (nomination) Eagle Award for Favourite Fan Publication — UK for BEM
- 1980 Eagle Award for Favourite Fan Publication — UK for BEM
- 1981 Eagle Award for Favourite Fan Publication — UK for BEM

== Bibliography ==
Comics writing:

- 2000 AD (IPC Media):
  - “Space Prospector” (Tharg's Future Shocks), #40 (26 Nov. 1977) — with Trevor Goring
  - "Time Past” (Tharg's Future Shocks), #42 (10 Dec. 1977) — with Jose Luis Ferrer
  - "[Time Was]” (Tharg's Future Shocks), #46 (7 Jan. 1978) — with Ramon Sola
  - "The Illusion Man” (Tharg's Future Shocks) #76 (5 Aug. 1978) — with Pierre Frisano [as Frisano]
- "Unicorn on Winchester” (Marvel Showcase), The Mighty World of Marvel #16 (Marvel UK, Sept. 1984) — with Dave Harwood
- Conqueror (Harrier Comics):
  - “The Intruders,” #1 (Oct. 1984) — with Dave Harwood
  - “Kidnap,” #3 (Dec. 1984) — with Dave Harwood
- "Open Planet” (Lieutenant Fl'ff), #4 (Feb. 1985) — with Dave Harwood
  - "Ball Game” (Lieutenant Fl'ff), #4 (Feb. 1985) — with Dave Harwood
  - "Let's Be Frank," #5 (Apr. 1985) — with Dave Harwood
  - "New Boots,” #5 (Apr. 1985) — with Dave Harwood
  - "Interlude,” #5 (Apr. 1985) — with Kevin Hopgood
  - "Shadows,” #5 (Apr. 1985) — with Dave Harwood
  - "With Your Musket, Fife and Drum,” #5 (Apr. 1985) — with Dave Harwood
- Swiftsure (Harrier):
  - "Arrival” (Lieutenant Fl'ff), #1 (May 1985) — with Dave Harwood and Mark Farmer
  - "The Assassin” (Ram: Assassin), #1 (May 1985) — with R. F. O'Roake
  - "The Rescue” (Ram: Assassin), #3 (Aug. 1985) — with Jeff Anderson
  - "Strike Point!” (Lieutenant Fl'ff), #4 (Sept. 1985) — with Mike Collins
  - "Pressure Point” (Lieutenant Fl'ff), #5 (Nov. 1985) — with Mike Collins
  - "The Castle” (Ram: Assassin), #5 (Nov. 1985) — with Jeff Anderson
- Conqueror Universe #1 (Harrier, Dec. 1985)
  - "Castle in the Air” — with Dave Harwood
  - "Sacrifice” — with Tony O'Donnell
  - "The Naming” — with Mike Collins and David A. Roach
  - "Captain Thunder” — with Kevin Hopgood
  - "A Short History of the Conqueror Universe” — with Graham Bleathman
  - "The Conqueror Universe Story Chronology, 2470 to 2492” — with Dave Harwood
- Swiftsure and Conqueror (Harrier):
  - "Entrapment” (Lieutenant Fl'ff), #8 (May 1986) — with Steve Yeowell
  - "The Dungeon” (Ram: Assassin), #8 (May 1986) — with Tim C. Perkins
  - "Fair Exchange” (Redfox), #9 (July 1986) — with Fox; C. Cropley (art assist)
  - "Fl'ff's Story Part One” (Lieutenant Fl'ff), #9 (July 1986) — with Dave Harwood
  - "Points of View” (Lieutenant Fl'ff ), #10 (Sept. 1986) — with Dave Harwood
  - "Ice Winds” (Lieutenant Fl'ff), #11 (Nov. 1986) — with Steve Yeowell
  - "Assault on Valley Thirteen” (Lieutenant Fl'ff), #11 (Nov. 1986) — with Dave Harwood
  - “The Foundation” (Ram: Assassin), #12 (Jan. 1987) — with Dave Harwood
  - "Nowhere to Run” (Lieutenant Fl'ff ), #13 (Mar. 1987) — with Steve Yeowell and Ashley Watkins
  - "Wild One” (Lieutenant Fl'ff), #14 (May 1987) — with Art Wetherell and Tem Latham
- Barbarienne (Harrier):
  - "Memree: The Girl in the Iron Gag” (Charol), #1 (Marc. 1987) — with Nick Neocleous
  - "Captives of the Churmuk," #2 (1987) — with Nick Neocleous
  - "Escape Clause" (Charol), #3 (1987) — with Nick Neocleous
  - "Fever Dream” (Charol), #4 (Nov. 1987) — with Nick Neocleous
  - "The Slavers," #5 (1988) — with John H. Marshall
  - "Cold Vengeance” (Charol), #6 (Apr. 1988) — with John H. Marshall and Darrell Andrews
  - "Crossover with Cuirass, Part 2 of 3: Night in Castle," #7 (1988) — with John H. Marshall
  - "Crossover with Cuirass, Part 3 of 3: Red Dawn," #8 (1988) — with John H. Marshall
- "The Fallen Star” (Cuirass), Harrier Preview #1 (Harrier, March 1988) — with Cam Smith
- "Compact of Fire” Nightbird #1 (Harrier, May 1988) — with Cam Smith
- Sabina (Fantagraphics/Eros):
  - "["I'd seen the advertisement in The Stage…”], #1 (Dec. 1993) — with Paul Naring
  - "["This was my first appearance as Sabina's assistant…”], #2 (Jan. 1994) — with Paul Naring
  - "The Big Picture!”, #3 (May 1994) — with Paul Naring
