= Comics art and writing of Denis Gifford =

Denis Gifford
- Areas: Writer, Penciller, Inker
- Notable works: Streamline; Marvelman; Tiger-Man

Denis Gifford was a prolific comic artist and writer, most active in the 1940s, 50s and 60s. Gifford's work was largely of humour strips in British comics, often for L. Miller & Son. He was an influential comics historian, particularly of British comics from the 19th century to the 1940s.

Gifford was also a committed comic collector of British and US comics, and owned what has been called the "world's largest collection of British comics."

== Comics art and scriptwriting: Marvelman titles ==
Gifford wrote, drew and often created a wide selection of back-up strips that featured in a number of the Marvelman titles, usually one-page humour strips, as well as the Marvelman Family strip in its own title. Gifford used a variety of pen-names for the work, including Belteshazzar Oakworm, Clubtwee Gleeb and 'Fred Granule Bepp'., Joe King, Jack Upp and Belle Tupp. These humour strips may have been reprinted across a number of titles in the L. Miller & Son stable.

- Young Joey; in Marvelman #185, #188 (1957), #300 (c. 1960), #341 (Sept 1960) #368 (Dec 1962) and others; L. Miller & Son - art/script
- Flip & Flop; in Marvelman #185, #188 (1957), #365 (Sept 1962), and others; L. Miller & Son - creator/art/script
- The Friendly Soul; in Marvelman #185 (1957), #341 (Sept 1960), #369 (Jan 1963) and others; L. Miller & Son - art/script
- Krazy Krockitt; in Marvelman #341 (Sept 1960), and others; L. Miller & Son - creator/art/script
- The Friendly Soul; in Young Marvelman (1954 series) #314 (Sept 1959), #334; L. Miller & Son - art/script
- The Friendly Soul; in Young Marvelman Annual (1955); L. Miller & Son - art
- Young Joey; in Young Marvelman Annual (1955); L. Miller & Son - art
- Wild Bill Hiccup; in Marvelman #300 (c. 1960); L. Miller & Son - creator(?)/art/ script
- Nelly on the Telly; in Marvelman #300 (c. 1960); L. Miller & Son - art/ script
- Flip and Flop in Marvelman Annual (1959); L. Miller & Son - creator/art/script
- Marvelman Family; in Marvelman Family (1956–59 series); various issues (1950s); L. Miller & Son - art/script

== Comics art and scriptwriting: Western titles ==
Gifford produced a variety of Western strips, including Western adventure strips for Ace High Western Comics and The Sheriff, and several one-page Western humour strips for L. Miller & Son's numerous Western titles, with a regular inside back cover slot in Gunhawks Western.

- Ace High' Rogers versus Redmask; in Ace High Western Comics #1 (of 1) (June 1946); International - art/script
- Various strips; The Sheriff #1 (1948); Screen Stories - art (and script?)
- Roy Rogers and Trigger in Apache Rose: a Republic Picture in Trucolor; in The Sheriff #2 (1948); Screen Stories - art
- Bill Elliott in Republic's Old Los Angeles; in The Sheriff #3 (1948); Screen Stories - art (and script?)
- Wild Bill Hiccup; in Daniel Boone #31 (c. 1960 - no date)(1957 series)(poss. repr. from Marvelman #300); L. Miller & Son - art/ script
- Dan'l Goone; in Daniel Boone (1957 series) #31 (c. 1960 - no date); L. Miller & Son - art/ script
- Krazy Krockitt; in Daniel Boone (1957 series) #31 (c. 1960 - no date); L. Miller & Son - art/ script
- Jim Pooey the Dopey Depitty; in Daniel Boone (1957 series) #31 (c. 1960 - no date); L. Miller & Son - art/ script
- Various strips; in Annie Oakley #2–17 (July 1957–58); L. Miller & Son - art (and script?)
- Jim Pooey - the Dopey Depitty; in Pancho Villa - Robin Hood of Mexico #63 (1959); L. Miller & Son - art/script
- Daniel Boone; in Gunhawks Western #2–10 (Nov(?) 1960– Jun 1961); Anglo (Atlas) - art (and script?)
- Corkeye; in Gunhawks Western (issue unknown) (c.1960); Anglo (Atlas) - art/script
- Jester James; in Gunhawks Western #7 (March 1961); Anglo (Atlas) - art/script
- Bonko the Dopey Depitty; in Gunhawks Western #8 (April 1961); Anglo (Atlas) - art/script (poss. reprinted in Davy Crockett (1956 series) #41 (no date); L.Miller & Son
- Sam Gass; in Gunhawks Western #10 (June 1961); Anglo (Atlas) - art/script
- Wynott Burp; in Gunhawks Western; Unknown issues (c. 1961); Anglo (Atlas) - art/script

== Comics art and scriptwriting: personal projects ==
Gifford created, or co-created, several titles, as well as publishing or editing and drawing together the work of other creators in a number of titles. Most notable was probably his co-creation with Bob Monkhouse of the superhero Streamline and the Streamline Comics title, but his short-lived Ally Sloper title was a significant if unsuccessful attempt to blend nostalgia for British comics with the more adult approach of the Modern Age to reach new audiences. Gifford and Monkhouse also combined to form Streamline Publications, specialising mostly in reprints of US comics and pulp novels.

- Streamline; Streamline Comics #1 (1947); Cardal Publishing - co-creator/art/cover art/script
- Terry Traylor (cover); Streamline Comics #2 (1947); Cardal Publishing - co-creator/cover art
- Bully Beef; Streamline Comics (issue unknown) (1947); Cardal Publishing - creator/art
- Super Worm; Streamline Comics (issue unknown) (1947); Cardal Publishing - creator/art
- Search for the Secret City (repr. in Black Tower Gold Collection vol. 3); Streamline Comics #4 (1947); Cardal Publishing - art/script
- Inky the Imp of the Inkpot; Streamline Comics #4 (1947); Cardal Publishing - creator/art/script
- Panto Pranks; Panto Pranks #1 (of 1) (1949); Hotspur Publishing -creator/art/script
- Little Red Riding Hood and the Hungry Wolf; Panto Pranks #1 (of 1) (1949); Hotspur Publishing - creator/art/script
- Cinders and her Sour Sisters; Panto Pranks #1 (of 1) (1949); Hotspur Publishing - creator/art/script
- The Klever Kids; Panto Pranks #1 (of 1) (1949); Hotspur Publishing - creator/art/script
- Jest and Lest; Panto Pranks #1 (of 1) (1949); Hotspur Publishing - creator/art/script
- Raddled Riddles and Red Riding Hood 'Dot to Dot'; Panto Pranks #1 (of 1) (1949); Hotspur Publishing - creator/art/script
- Panto Pranks Playtime; Panto Pranks #1 (of 1) (1949); Hotspur Publishing - creator/art/script
- Simple Simon Christmas Crackers; Panto Pranks #1 (of 1) (1949); Hotspur Publishing - creator/art/script
- Puss in Boots; Panto Pranks #1 (of 1) (1949); Hotspur Publishing - creator/art/script
- Various strips; Panto Pranks #1 (of 1) (1949); Hotspur Publishing - creator/art/script
- Fizz Comics #1 (of 1) (April 1949); Modern Fiction - script/editor
- Tiger-Man; Ray Regan #1 (of 1) (April 1949); Modern Fiction - creator/art/script/editor
- Various strips; Ray Regan #1 (of 1) (April 1949); Modern Fiction - script/editor [25]
- Tobor the Great; Star Comics #1–2 (1954); D Publications - script (art by James Bleach)
- Jill Day; Star Comics (unknown issue) (1954); D Publications - script/ art
- Various strips; Star Comics #1–2 (1954); D Publications - ed./art
- Various strips; Ally Sloper #1–4 (of 4) (1976); Alan Class Publishing - editor
- Political Fun; Ally Sloper #2 (1976); Alan Class Publishing - script (art by Terry Wakefield)
- Various strips; Comics 101 #1 (of 1) (1976); Convention souvenir comic - art
- Sheerluck Jones, Super Sleuth; Melvin's Money Fun #1–2 (Sept 1981–1982); Department for National Savings - creator/art/script
- Koo-koo Korner; Melvin's Money Fun #1 (and #2?) (Sept 1981–1982); Department for National Savings - creator/art/script

== Comics art and scriptwriting: other titles ==
The majority of Gifford's output is of humour strips, for a wide range of titles. He also co-created, wrote and drew the superhero strip Streamline and drew and wrote several adventure strips.

- Magical Monty; All-Fun Comics; Vol.3, #1–4 (1942); A. Soloway. - Art/script
- Pansy Potter the Strongman's Daughter(?); The Beano; Various issues; (c. 1943); D. C. Thomson. - Art (and script?)
- Various strips; Comic Capers; Vol.3, #1–4; (c. 1944); A. Soloway. - Art (and script?)
- William Wagtail; Knockout (1939–63 series); Various (1945); Amalgamated Press. - Art/script
- Mr Muscle; Dynamic Comics; Various issues (1945); Gerald C. Swann. - Creator/art/script
- Miserable Mick and Jolly Roger(?); Big Little Comic; #1 (of 1) (1945); PM (Marx). - Art (and script?)
- Various strips; Silver King; #1 (of 1 issue) (1946); PM (Marx). - Art (and script?)
- Herbie; Corker Comics; #1 (of 1) (July 1946); International. - Art/script
- Various strips; Crack Shots; #2 (of 2) (July-Sept 1946); Fisher. - Art (and script?)
- Various strips; Laugh Fun Book; #1 (of 1) (Sept 1947); PM (Marx). - Art (and script?)
- Various strips; Whacky Rodeo; #2 (of 2) (1947); Transatlantic/ Funnibook (Cartoon Art). - Art (and script?)
- Various strips; Comic Adventures; Vol.5, #1–4 (c. 1947); Cardal Publishing. - Art (and script?)
- Various strips; Fun Parade; #1 (of 1) (1949); Hotspur Publishing. - Art (and script?)
- Various strips; Funfair; #1 (of 1) (1949); Hotspur Publishing. - Art (and script?)
- Various strips; Jumbo Comics; #1 (of 1)(1949); Hotspur Publishing. - Art (and script?)
- Various strips; Amazing Comics; #1 (of 1) (Oct 1949); Modern Fiction. - Art/script
- Mr. Busybody; Comet Comics (1949 series); #170 (20 October 1951); Amalgamated Press. - Art/script
- Our Ernie; Knockout (1939–63 series); Various (1950s); Amalgamated Press. - Art
- Steadfast McStaunch; Knockout (1939–63 series); Various issues, incl. #657; (1950–52); Amalgamated Press. - Creator/script/art
- Dicky Diddle; Knockout (1939–63 series); Various issues (1952); Amalgamated Press. - Art
- Simon the Simple Sleuth; Knockout (1939–63 series); Various issues (1950s); Amalgamated Press. - Art
- Sammy Sprockett and his Pocket Rocket; Chips; #2983 (6 June 1953); Amalgamated Press. - Art (and script?)
- Various strips; Family Fun; #1 (of 1) (1953); Pentland. - Art (and script?)
- Various strips; Space Comics; #51–54, #75 and others (1954); ABC (Arnold Book Company). - Art (and script?)
- Speedsmith; title unknown; issue unknown; (c. 1950s); ABC (Arnold Book Company. - Art (and script?)
- Various strips; Space Commando Comics; #51–59 (1954); L. Miller & Son. - Art (and script?)
- Steadfast McStaunch; Knockout Fun Book; 1955 - 1 of 1 (1955); Amalgamated Press. - Art
- Puzzle Corner; Knockout Fun Book; 1955 - 1 of 1 (1955); Amalgamated Press. - Art
- The Friendly Soul (repr. from Marvelman); TV Heroes; #8–26 (October 1958-August 1960); L. Miller & Son. - Art (and script?)
- Nelly on the Telly; TV Heroes; #20 (and poss. others) (c. 1960); L. Miller & Son. - Art (and script?)
- Krazy Krockitt; TV Heroes; #20 (and poss. others) (c. 1960); L. Miller & Son. - Art (and script?)
- Beat the White Snide Clock; MAD Magazine (UK edition); #2 (March 1959);EC Comics. - Art
- Various strips; TV Features; #2–5 (Nov 1960– March 1961); Anglo Features. - Art (and script?)
- Sam Gass; TV Features; unknown issue (April–May 1961); Anglo Features. - Art (and script?)
- Corkeye; TV Features; #6–7 (April–May 1961); Anglo Features. - Art (and script?)
- Jester James; TV Features; #8 (Jun 1961); Anglo Features. - Art (and script?)
- Our Lad; Captain Miracle (1960–61 series); #7 and others (1961); Anglo Features. - Art/script
- Adventures of Baron Munchausen; Classics Illustrated; #146 (April 1962); Gilberton Company. - Art
- Jester Moment; TV Tornado; #1–2, #4–5, #8–9, #12–14, #17, #22, #29, #38, #81 and others (1967–68); City Publications. - Art/script
- Dan Dan the TV Man; TV Tornado; #1–5, #8, #9, #12, #18, #20 and others (1967–68); City Publications. - Art/script
- News of The Universe Television Service; TV Tornado; #13 (1967); City Publications. - Art/script
- Dan Dan the TV Man; TV Tornado Annual 1967, 1968 (1967, 1968); World Distributors. - Art/script
- Jester Moment; TV Tornado Annual 1968 (1968); World Distributors. - Art/script
- Steadfast McStaunch; Whizzer & Chips; #1, #2, #3 and others (1969); IPC. - Creator/art/script
- Koo-Koo Klub; Whizzer & Chips; #1, #2, #3 and others (1969–?); IPC. - Creator/art/script
- Jolly Jack; Super DC; #6 (1969); Top Sellers Ltd. (Thorpe & Porter). - Art
- The Friendly Soul (repr. from Marvelman?); Superman Bumper Book 1970 (1970); Top Sellers Ltd. (Thorpe & Porter). - Art/script
- The Friendly Soul (repr. from Marvelman #18); Super DC Bumper Book; #1 (of 1) (1971); Top Sellers Ltd. (Thorpe & Porter). - Art/script

== Magazine strip cartoon art and writing ==
- Ignatz; in Galaxy; 2 issues (unnumbered) (April 1946, May 1946); Star Publishing Corporation - creator/art/script
- Puzzle Quiz with Dr Dizz; in The Junior News and Storyteller #4, one other issue (23 October 1953); Westworld Publishing reator/art/script
- Tele Toon; in Rex magazine #22-#35 (June 1971-July 1972) - art/script
- Rivals of Sheerluck Omes; in Rex magazine; issues unknown (1972) - art/script
- Morecambe & Wise in Reveille ( c. June 1976-August 1976); IPC Newspapers - script (art Terry Wakefield)

== Books on comics history and criticism ==
Gifford's popular history of comics, The International Book of Comics, comprehensively illustrated from his own collection.

Gifford's writing on comics included general books for a popular audience and more thoroughly researched histories of the medium. He sought to both further the scholarship of comics and to increase general public understanding and appreciation: "I have a determination to establish the British comic paper as a valuable artform and a source of history."

- Discovering Comics (1971), Shire Publications. ISBN 0-7478-0108-8
- Stap Me!: History of the British Newspaper Strip (1971), Shire Publications. ISBN 0-85263-103-0
- Test Your N.Q. (Nostalgia Quotient) (1972), New English Library. ISBN 0-450-01428-2
- The British Comics Catalogue, 1874–1974 (1974), Greenwood Press. ISBN 0-8371-8649-8
- Victorian Comics (1974), George Allen & Unwin. ISBN 0-04-741002-7
- Happy Days : a Century of Comics (1975), Jupiter Press. ISBN 1-870630-47-5
- Collectors Comics No 1: Penny Comics of the Thirties (ed.) (1975), New English Library.
- British Comics, Story Papers, Picture Libraries, Girls Papers, American Reprints, Facsmilies, Giveaways Price Guide (1982), Association of Comics Enthusiasts
- The International Book of Comics (1984), Hamlyn. ISBN 0-603-03574-4
- The Complete Catalogue of British Comics (1985), Webb & Bower. ISBN 0-86350-079-X
- Encyclopedia of Comic Characters (1987), Longman. ISBN 0-582-89294-5
- Cartoon Aid (1987), Band Aid Trust for Comic Relief. ISBN 0-948836-05-9
- Comics at War (1987), Hawk Books. ISBN 0-948248-85-8
- "Eagle" Book of Cutaways (ed. and introduction) (1988), Webb & Bower. ISBN 0-86350-285-7
- The Story Paper Price Guide: Collector's Companion No. 1 (1989), Association of Comic Enthusiasts
- The Comic Art of Charlie Chaplin : A Graphic Celebration of Chaplin's Centenary (1989), Hawk Books. ISBN 0-948248-21-1
- The Best of "Eagle" Annual, 1951–59 (1989) (with Marcus Morris), Webb & Bower. ISBN 0-86350-345-4
- American Comic Strip Collections, 1884–1939: The Evolutionary Era (1990), G. K. Hall & Co. ISBN 0-8161-7270-6
- The Best of "Girl" Annual, 1952–59 (1990), Webb & Bower. ISBN 0-86350-394-2
- The Best of "Boy's Own" in Colour (1991), Webb & Bower. ISBN 0-86350-395-0
- Christmas Comic Posters (1991), H. C. Blossom. ISBN 1-872532-57-8
- Super Duper Supermen! Comic Book Heroes from the Forties and Fifties (1992), Greenwood. ISBN 1-872532-84-5
- Space Aces! Comic Book Heroes from the Forties and the Fifties (1992), Greenwood. ISBN 1-872532-89-6

== Contributions on comics history and criticism ==
The Encyclopaedia of Children's Literature, including a chapter by Gifford, Popular Literature: Comics, Dime Novels, Pulps and Penny Dreadfuls

- Aaaaaagh! A Celebration of Comics at the Institute of Contemporary Arts at the Mall (articles by Denis Gifford and others) (1970); Institute of Contemporary Arts.
- Puck - Picture Card; no.1 in series (introduction by Denis Gifford) (c.1970).
- The Magnet - Picture Card; no.2 in series (introduction by Denis Gifford) (c.1970).
- Tuppenny Coloureds (Comic Cuts), in The Saturday Book (1971) (ed. John Hadfield, article by Denis Gifford); 31st (1971) edition; Clarkson N. Potter. ISBN 0-09-109050-4
- The Day the Comics went Bats; in The Dracula Scrapbook (ed. Peter Haining, chapter by Denis Gifford) (1976); New English Library. ISBN 0-681-41643-2
- World Encyclopaedia of Comics (ed. Maurice Horn, contributions by Denis Gifford and others); New York: Chelsea House Publishers (1976). ISBN 0-7910-4856-X
- The Catalogue (comics) in The Encyclopaedia of Horror (ed. Richard Davis) (1981); London: Octopus. ISBN 0-7064-1507-8
- Publicaciones de Comics Hasta le Segunda Guerra Mundial; in Historia de los Comics (ed. Josep Toutain and Javier Coma); Vol. 13 (1982); p. 357–64; Barcelona: Toutain Editor. - article on prewar British comics.
- Thirty Years of British Mad, 1959–89 (1989) (by Ron Letchford, introduction by Denis Gifford), Suron Enterprises. ISBN 0-9514602-0-X
- Los Comics en la Prensa Britanica. De Joy a Jane; in Historia de los Comics (ed. Josep Toutain and Javier Coma); Vol. 15 (n.d.); Barcelona: Toutain Editor; p. 415–420.
- Comic-Books en Canada y Australia; in Historia de los Comics (ed. Josep Toutain and Javier Coma); Vol. 45; Barcelona: Toutain Editor.
- Popeye: 60th Anniversary Edition (1995) (ed. Mike Higgs, contributors Denis Gifford and others); Book Sales. ISBN 0-7858-0397-1
- Swift (1954); in The Cambridge Guide to Children's Books in English (2001); Cambridge: Cambridge University Press. ISBN 978-0-521-55064-2
- Popular Literature: Comics, Dime Novels, Pulps and Penny Dreadfuls; Chapter 28 in International Companion Encyclopedia of Children's Literature (chapter by Denis Gifford, remainder by other contributors, ed. Peter Hunt) (2004). ISBN 0-415-08856-9

== Articles on comics history, criticism and collecting ==
The historical magazine History Today (May 1971), featuring an early article by Gifford on comics history.

- The Evolution of the British Comic; in History Today; vol. 21, issue #5 (May 1971); p. 349–358.
- Article on British comics, in Mayfair; vol. 6, issue #7 (July 1971); p. 3. - British magazine.
- The Mystery of the Multiplying Marvels; in Rex; issue #24 (August 1971). - British magazine.
- Cartoonists of the Kingdom Unite!; in Rex; issue #27 (November 1971). - British magazine.
- Great Newspapers Reprinted Special: Six Comics of World War One (article in inside cover) (1972), P. Way.
- A Century of Comics; in Sunday Observer newspaper Christmas Magazine (22 December 1974); p. 14. - British newspaper supplement.
- Editorial in Mixed Bunch #1 (Brainstorm Comics #3) (1976); Alchemy Publications.
- Comic Q+As; Ally Sloper; #1 (October 1976).
- Comic Queries; Ally Sloper; #2 (November 1976).
- My Favourite Comic; Ally Sloper; #3 (December 1976)
- Article on Frank Bellamy Art, Illustrators: the magazine of the Association of Illustrators; vol. 2, issue #6 (May/ June 1977).
- Tom Webster: Is There Still Life After Animation?; The Guardian (29 March 1980), p. 10.
- Ally Sloper: The Legendary Cartoon Character Celebrates the 100th Anniversary of his Comic This Year, in Book and Magazine Collector; (May 1984); issue #3; p. 37–43. - British magazine.
- Ally Sloper; in Comic Art (October 1984); p. 9.
- Frozen Smiles; in WittyWorld International Comics Magazine; issue #1 (1987). - US fanzine.
- Cartoon Aid; in WittyWorld International Comics Magazine; issue #2 (1987). - US fanzine.
- Association of Comics Enthusiasts: ACE!; in The Funnies Paper (January 1988). - US fanzine.
- Fifty Years of Fun: Dandy, Britain's Oldest Comic; in WittyWorld International Comics Magazine, issue #3 (1988). - US fanzine.
- Half Century of Beano; in Antique & Collectors Fayre Magazine; Vol. 3, issue #1 (July 1988).
- Collecting Comics 8-issue series of articles; in Antique & Collectors Fayre Magazine (1980s).
- Founding a Family, editorial in Miracleman Family #2 (reprints 1956–59 series Marvelman Family #4) (September 1988). - History of Marvelman Family.
- World War II: Wartime Children's Comics; in WittyWorld International Comics Magazine; issue #6–7 (1989). - US fanzine.
- La Bande Dessinée Anglaise: Entretien avec Denis Gifford (II); in Le Collectionneur de Bandes Dessinée (Summer 1998).

== Interviews on comics history, criticism and collecting ==
- Clapperboard, Granada TV (30 December 1974). - British children's TV programme, Chris Kelly interviews Denis Gifford on comics and cartoons. .
- Comics; Issue # 21 (100 Anni 100 Eroi - Il Fumetto Inglese di Denis Gifford) (November 1975); p. 1. - Italian comics magazine.
- Steve Dowling interview by Denis Gifford at Comics 101 convention, 20 March 1976, in Ally Sloper; #1 (October 1976) (repr. in Comic Bits #1 (2001)).
- Film Funsters Terry Wakefield interview by Denis Gifford; in Ally Sloper; #2 (November 1976).
- Leo Baxendale - Bash Street Dad; Leo Baxendale interview by Denis Gifford; in Ally Sloper; #3 (December 1976).
- Over the Rainbow to Happy Days (Alan Clark interviews Denis Gifford), in Golden Fun, issue #4 (early 1980s). - British fanzine.
- Byron Rogers; Desperate Den; in The Sunday Times magazine (Sunday 19 June 1987). - British newspaper supplement.
- To be Continued ... 1920–1930 (no date). - Film documentary in series about the history of comics.
- Jonathan Sale, Collecting: Paper values, The Independent (Sunday 8 February 1998) - Article on comic collecting, incl. interview with Denis Gifford.

== Lectures and presentations on comics history and criticism ==
- Comics in Great Britain; Lucca 11th International Comics Festival (1975)
- Halfpenny Marvels and Modern Winders; Lucca 13th International Comics Festival (1978)
- Infamous Funnies: the American Influence on British Comics; Lucca 13th International Comics Festival (1980)
- From Penny Dreadfuls to Twopenny Bloods; Lucca 15th International Comics Festival (1982)
- Comics and Show-business; International Forum on Comic Book Printing; Lucca 16th International Comics Festival (1984)
- The Story of D. C. Thomson Publishing; International Forum on Comic Book Printing; Lucca 18th International Comics Festival (1992)

== Obituaries of comic and cartoon creators ==
- Reg Parlett; PEAPS Mailing (Pulp Era Amateur Press Association); Issue #19 (April 1992).
- Harvey Kurtzman; The Independent (Wednesday 24 February 1993).
- Dennis Castle; The Independent (Thursday 13 May 1993).
- Fred Robinson; The Independent (Monday 31 May 1993).
- Vincent T. Hamlin; The Independent (Monday 12 July 1993).
- Roland Davies; The Independent (Thursday, 16 December 1993).
- Zack Mosley; The Independent (Monday 10 January 1994).
- Jack Kirby; The Independent (Friday 11 February 1994).
- Alfred Harvey; The Independent (Tuesday 26 July 1994).
- Bud Sagendorf; The Independent (Thursday 13 October 1994).
- Dennis M. Reader; The Independent (Wednesday 7 June 1995).
- (Carl Giles) Cartoonist to the Nation; The Guardian (Tuesday 29 August 1995), p. 14.
- Burne Hogarth; The Independent (Wednesday 31 January 1996).
- Jerry Siegel; The Independent (Thursday 1 February 1996).
- Stan Drake; The Independent (Wednesday 12 March 1997).
- Barry Appleby; The Independent (Friday 22 March 1996).
- Michael Cummings; The Independent (Saturday 11 October 1997).
- Reg Smythe; The Independent (Monday 15 June 1998), p. 6.
- Les Lilley; The Independent (Wednesday 4 November 1998), p. 6.
- Bob Kane; The Independent (Monday 9 November 1998)
- Jean-Claude Forest; The Independent (Friday 1 January 1999)
- Lee Falk; The Independent (Friday 19 March 1999).
- John L. Goldwater; The Independent (Saturday 27 March 1999).
- John Broome; The Independent (Thursday 27 May 1999)
- George Smith; The Independent (Monday 28 June 1999), p.6
- Roland Fiddy; The Independent (Monday 12 July 1999)
- John K. Geering; The Independent (Thursday 19 August 1999)
- John Musgrave-Wood; The Guardian (Friday 29 September 1999), p. 26.
- Don Martin; The Independent (Tuesday 11 January 2000).
- Harold Cramond; The Independent (Wednesday 19 January 2000).
- Gil Kane; The Independent (Thursday 10 February 2000).
- Charles Schulz; The Guardian (Monday 14 February 2000).
- Elliot Caplin; The Independent (Wednesday 2 March 2000).
- Fred Rhoads; The Independent (Thursday 3 March 2000).
- Gil Kane; The Independent (Thursday 10 March 2000).
- Bill Holroyd; The Independent (Wednesday 15 March 2000).
- Norman Thelwell; The Guardian (Tuesday 10 February 2004).
- Dave Langdon; The Guardian (Tuesday 22 November 2011).

== Biographical articles ==
- "McGill, Donald Fraser Gould (1875–1962)". Oxford Dictionary of National Biography (online ed.). Oxford University Press. doi:10.1093/ref:odnb/55528. (Subscription, Wikipedia Library access or UK public library membership required.)
- "Ally Sloper group (active 1867–1923)". Oxford Dictionary of National Biography (online ed.). Oxford University Press. doi:10.1093/ref:odnb/66301. (Subscription, Wikipedia Library access or UK public library membership required.)

== Books about Denis Gifford and comics ==
- The Denis Gifford collection, part one : Sunday 25th February 2001; Worksop : Hamer 20th century books (2001). - catalogue of auction of Gifford's collection. Introduction by Bob Monkhouse.

== See also ==
- Published work on cinema by Denis Gifford
- Publications by Denis Gifford on radio, television, music and music hall
- The British Film Catalogue
- Streamline (comics)
- Ally Sloper Award
