= Denis Gifford =

British historian, writer and comic artist (1927–2000)

- Born: Denis Gifford; 26 December 1927; Forest Hill, London, England, UK
- Died: 18 May 2000 (aged 72); Sydenham, London, England, UK
- Occupations: Film and comic historian, comic artist and writer, non-fiction writer, radio and television
- Spouse: Angela Kalagias (divorced)
- Children: Pandora Jane (daughter)
- Writing career
- Genres: Film history, comics history, radio history
- Subjects: 19th Century comics, early 20th Century comics, British/US comics of the 1930s, 1940s and 1950s, early film history, horror films, science-fiction films, early radio history.

Denis Gifford (26 December 1927 – 18 May 2000) was a British writer, broadcaster, journalist, comic artist and historian of film, comics, television and radio. In his lengthy career, he wrote and drew for British comics; wrote more than fifty books on the creators, performers, characters and history of popular media; devised, compiled and contributed to popular programmes for radio and television; and directed several short films. Gifford was also a major comics collector, owning what was perhaps the largest collection of British comics in the world.

Gifford's work in the history of film and comics, particularly in Britain, provided an account of the work in those media of previously unattempted scope, discovering countless lost films and titles and identifying numerous uncredited creators. He was particularly interested in the early stages in film and comics history, for which records were scarce and unreliable, and his own vast collection was an invaluable source. Gifford produced detailed filmographies of every traceable fiction, non-fiction and animated film ever released in the UK, and of early animated films in the US.

He compiled the first comics catalogue attempting to list every comic ever published in the UK, as well as the first price guide for British comics. His research into the early development of comics and cinema laid the groundwork for their academic study, and his reference works remain key texts in the fields.

Gifford was also a cartoonist and comic artist who worked for numerous titles, mostly for British comics in the 1940s, 50s and 60s. Although these were largely humour strips, he worked in a range of genres including superhero, Western, science fiction and adventure.

== Early life: 1927–48 ==
Gifford was born in Forest Hill, London, the only son of William Gifford, a printer, and Amelia née Hutchings. He grew up in the prosperous South London suburb of Sydenham, but was evacuated during the war to Tonbridge, Kent.

Gifford attended the South London private school Dulwich College (1939–44), and while a pupil there was an avid comic collector and cartoonist. He produced a comic, The Junior, using heated gelatine and hectograph ink, which he sold for 1d around the school, but had published comics art by the time he was 14 (1942).

Gifford became friends with Bob Monkhouse, a Dulwich schoolmate, fellow schoolboy cartoonist and later TV comedian and presenter, who studied in the year below and also had cartoons published while at the school. Gifford and Monkhouse collaborated on comics writing and drawing, a partnership that was to continue for many years in various forms, including as radio scriptwriters. The two toured together as a comedy act in the south east of England in the late 1940s with Ernie Lower's West Bees Concert Party, giving charity performances with Monkhouse as the 'straight man'. Gifford continued drawing during National Service in the Royal Air Force (1946-8), in which he served in the clerical position of 'AC1 Clerk/Pay Accounts', and went on to draw the Telestrip cartoon for the London Evening News.

== Comic art and comic writing: 1942–82 ==
Gifford's prolific career as a cartoonist included both newspaper strips and comics, almost entirely for British publishers. His first published work was Magical Monty for All-Fun Comics (1942) at the age of 14, with a contribution to The Dandy the same year, and briefly worked as junior cartoonist for the newspaper Reynold's News (1944–45). He collaborated on comics writing and drawing with school friend Bob Monkhouse while they were still pupils at Dulwich College together.

After his National Service, Gifford drew the Telestrip cartoon for the London Evening News, continuing in Rex magazine (1971–72), and on bubblegum and cigarette sweet packets. Other newspaper strips were produced by Gifford for Empire State News and Sunday Dispatch.

Gifford's early work was with D.C. Thomson and the majority of his work was for humour strips, but he went on to cover various genres and styles, including adventure, detective, science fiction, Western and superheroes.

Gifford was most productive as a comics artist in the 1940s, 50s and 60s. By the early 1970s Gifford's writing career, mainly on the subjects of comics and film history, began to take over from his work as a cartoonist in his own right.

=== Drawing style ===
Gifford had a distinctive, simple drawing style with a light-heartedness evident even in more action-orientated strips. Panels were often bustling and dynamic, with individual characters vying for attention. His humours strips were dense with conspicuously labelled puns and 'sight gags', the "visual conventions" of comic art, informed by an intense awareness of the cultural heritage of the medium.

In the period Gifford drew for them, D.C. Thomson and most British comic publishers had a strict policy that artists could not sign their work but exceptionally, he was allowed to clearly sign his art.

=== Golden Age superheroes: 1945–49 ===
Gifford created at least three of the earliest British Golden Age superheroes, Mr Muscle for Dynamic Comics (1945), Streamline, whose #1 tagline proclaimed him "The speediest fighter in the world", co-created with Monkhouse for Streamline Comics (1947) and Tiger-Man, debuting in Ray Regan #1 (1949). Gifford himself credits "the first British superhero in the American comic book style" to Derickson Dene by Nat Brand in British anthology comic The Triumph in 1939, but both Mr Muscle and Streamline were early attempts to introduce British characters in a characteristically American genre, prompted by severely limited imports or reprints of US superhero titles due to wartime paper rationing and import restrictions. Gifford and Monkhouse set up their own publishing company, Streamline, in the early 1950s which published reprints of other Golden Age superheroes such as Captain Might and Masterman.

Only Streamline Comics #1 had story and art by Gifford, although he contributed the one-page humour strip Inky the Imp of the Inkpot and the adventure strip Search for the Secret City in #4.

Mr Muscle should not be confused with the later DC character Mister Muscle of Hero Hotline, created by Bob Rozakis, or the Charlton Comics character Mr. Muscles, created by Jerry Siegel. Tiger-Man should not be confused with Tiger Man, the Street & Smith Golden Age hero, Tigerman, the Fiction House Golden Age hero, Tigerman or Trojak the Tiger-Man, the Marvel/Timely Golden Age heroes, or Tiger-Man, the Atlas/Seaboard character.

=== Gifford projects: Ray Regan, Star Comics, Panto Pranks: 1946–50s ===
Gifford created, wrote and edited several comics in the 1940s and 1950s. These included detective title Ray Regan (1949), with art by Ron Embleton, the pantomime-themed Panto Pranks (1949), which Gifford wrote and drew, Fizz Comics (1949) and Star Comics (1954), which he drew and edited with Monkhouse, featuring strips of contemporary entertainers Morecambe and Wise, Bob Monkhouse himself, Jill Day and movie character Tobor The Great. These titles created by Gifford often ran for just a single issue, to take advantage of a loophole in postwar paper rationing, but the succession of short projects suited Gifford's diverse interests as it enabled him to flit from genre to genre.

=== Western strips: Roy Rogers and others: 1946–61 ===
Gifford drew and often wrote a number of Western comics strips in the 1940s, 50s and 60s, including 'Ace High' Rogers versus Redmask (1946), Bill Elliott in Republic's Old Los Angeles in The Sheriff #3 (1948) and strips for Annie Oakley (1957–58) and Gunhawks Western (1960–61).

Gifford provided art for movie adaptation strip Roy Rogers in Western comic The Sheriff Comics (no date, 1950s), signing himself 'Gus Denis Gifford' and offering a drawing style [in which] "[h]is likenesses could approach very close to the American ones produced by Harry Parks", consistent with Gifford's busy, comical style in other genres.

=== Humour strips: Knockout, Whizzer & Chips and magazine strips: 1946–71 ===
Gifford and Monkhouse contributed cartoon strips to various magazines in the 1940s and 1950s, including Galaxy magazine (1946) (not to be confused with Galaxy Science Fiction).

Gifford drew the cover for Classics Illustrated #146 (British series), Adventures of Baron Munchausen (1962), a more comedic and cartoon-like rendering than was conventional for the title's covers, which tended to be classically heroic and often painted.

Gifford went on to produce several strips for the highly popular humour comic Knockout, including Our Ernie (1950), Stoneage Kit the Ancient Brit and his own creation, the gags and puzzles strip Steadfact McStaunch. He later revived Steadfast McStaunch for a run in IPC's new title Whizzer and Chips (1969), which itself merged with Knockout in 1973.

=== Anglo Studios: Marvelman, Captain Miracle, Super DC, TV Tornado: 1954–71 ===
After working with Mick Anglo on the ABC science-fiction title Space Comics (1953–54), Gifford began work for Anglo Studios when it was set up in 1954, including a long stint writing and illustrating early Marvelman, the superhero reinvented in the 1980s with a darker vision by Alan Moore. Gifford worked on a number of strips in several titles in the Marvelman stable, and created the light-hearted backup features Flip and Flop and The Friendly Soul. He also wrote an editorial piece, Founding a Family, on the history of Marvelman Family for a 1988 reprint of the strip in Miracleman Family #2.

When Anglo took on US reprint series Annie Oakley, Gifford was one of the staff of British and Spanish artists used to create new strips (1957–58). Gifford went on to provide Western strips for Anglo Features title Gunhawks Western (1960–61) and humour strip Our Lad for Anglo's Captain Miracle (1961) contributed several humour strips for Anglo's anthology of Silver Age DC reprints, Super DC (1969–70), as well as reprints of his humour strip The Friendly Soul from Marvelman in Superman Bumper Book (1970) and Super DC Bumper Book #1 (1971). Later in the 1960s, Gifford also produced the one-off News of the Universe Television Service and regular humour strips Dan Dan the TV Man and the collection of one or two-panel gags, Jester Moment for TV Tornado (1967–68) where Mick Anglo was editor.

== History and criticism of cinema: 1952–98 ==
=== Reference authorship ===
Although Gifford did not have an academic background, he was an acknowledged authority on film history who is respected by academics in film studies, media studies and social and cultural history. Much of his reference work is recommended reading in these disciplines. Along with several other pioneering film archivists, Gifford's 'encyclopaedic work' was recognised by the Institute of Historical Research as having "provided thoroughgoing maps of British film personnel and production histories".

Gifford compiled a comprehensive reference work of British-made films, The British Film Catalogue, 1895-1970: A Reference Guide, listing every traceable film made in the UK, including short films generally omitted by film catalogues, with detailed entries including running time, certificate, reissue date, distributor, production company, producer, director, main cast, genre and plot summary. It was a labour of many years, as Gifford tracked down retired industry professionals and researched back issues of trade publications, fanzines and directories. The Catalogue's third (1994) edition revised all entries and was published in two volumes, The Fiction Film, 1895–1994 and The Non-Fiction Film, 1888–1994. It became a seminal work for British film historians, acclaimed by The British Film Institute (BFI)'s curator of Moving Image in a Sight & Sound magazine shortlist of the best ever film books: "The nearest we have to a British national filmography was created not by any institute or university but by one man." Gifford's popular work A Pictorial History of Horror also made the shortlist.

All editions of the Catalogue omitted animated films, but Gifford's British Animated Films, 1895–1985: A Filmography provided a similarly completist approach. Over 1200 films were detailed, attempting to include every British animated film of the period with a cinema release, whether full-length feature, short, public information film or advertisement. Gifford also provides an historical overview, giving particular attention to the pre-World War II era. As he was to attempt with the history of comics, Gifford sought to correct inaccuracies in cinema history that gave undue credit to the US industry, citing Dudley Buxton "who [in 1915] first animated the sinking of the Lusitania in all its terrifying drama, three years before Winsor McCay tackled the same subject in the United States. Yet according to film history, McCay's version was the world's first dramatic cartoon film!"

Gifford's writing also included biographies of cinematic figures, including Karloff: The Man, The Monster, The Movies and The Movie Makers: Chaplin.

Gifford was a judge at the Sitges 1977 International Festival of Fantasy and Horror.

The BFI holds an extensive archive of interviews recorded by Gifford of various figures in the film, television and comics industries. The Denis Gifford Collection is held as part of the BFI National Library. The BFI ran a Denis Gifford Tribute Evening at the National Film Theatre in January 2001 to mark his work on film history.

=== Popular audience and fan press authorship ===
As well as vintage comedy, Gifford had a particular interest in genre films, favouring the origins of those genres and the lower-budget B-movie output. He had written for science fiction fanzines since the 1950s, which he regarded as the period in which the genre gained maturity in the cinema: "it was the 1950s before sci-fi really got started, first with George Pal's astounding semi-documentary Destination Moon pipped at cinematic post by Robert L. Lipert's B-movie Rocketship X-M. Where the cinema led, comics followed." He had attempted to spur early science fiction 'fandom' with his 1952 Space Patrol Official Handbook, an introduction to science fiction that included an index of 'films of future fantasy' from the 1902 French trick film A Trip to the Moon by Georges Méliès and the 1918 Danish A Trip to Mars up to contemporary films such as the 1951 The Day the Earth Stood Still, screen shots from recent science fiction films The Man from Planet X, Rocketship X-M, The Day the Earth Stood Still and When Worlds Collide. Astronomical facts and diagrams of imagined spacecraft and spacesuit, drawn by Gifford, were also included.

Horror held a special fascination for Gifford: he was an active figure in horror fandom of the 1950s, 60s and 70s, including the Gothique Film Society, and in the 1970s he had regular columns in Dez Skinn's House of Hammer magazine, first a serialised Golden History of Horror and later History of Hammer. However, Gifford had been deeply critical of Hammer Studios, especially the productions of its later years, preferring the more understated examples of early British and Hollywood horror. He found Hammer's relatively explicit use of blood-letting and sexuality to be cynically exploitative, noting in his 1973 A Pictorial History of Horror that "The new age of horror was geared to a new taste. Where the old films had quickly cut away from the sight of blood, Hammer cut in for a closeup." A Pictorial History of Horror was an influential work for a generation of film and horror enthusiasts, described in The Paris Review by author and journalist Dave Tompkins as "the most important book of my childhood".

Gifford was a lifelong fan of Laurel and Hardy, and founded 'Film Funsters', the first British branch of the Laurel & Hardy Appreciation Society, as well as writing several articles on the duo. He was also a keen Sherlock Holmes enthusiast, and was a member of the Sherlock Holmes Society, writing various reviews and articles on films featuring the detective.

Gifford wrote numerous articles on film and popular entertainment, both professionally and for fanzines.

== Career in cinema: 1962–67 ==
Although a highly respected film historian, Gifford's professional involvement in cinema was relatively limited. However, in the 1950s and 1960s, he directed and photographed a number of short films, most of which were publicity and public information films commissioned by the British Government. He also produced and directed the Pathe newsreel Highlight: The Singing Cinema (1964), a compilation of extracts from British musical films from 1929 to 1964.

While at Pathe, Gifford married Angela Kalagias, a fellow Pathé employee. The couple, who later divorced, had one daughter, Pandora Jane, born in 1965.

Gifford scripted the Space Race spoof Carry on Spaceman in 1962, but although scheduled, the film was not shot.

== History and criticism of comics: 1970–95 ==
Gifford was regarded by many as the UK's pre-eminent comics historian, particularly of early British comics. The British Library provides catalogues and reference works written by Gifford as assistance to researchers of its British Comics Collection, and indeed most of the reference works on the subject provided by the British Library were written by Gifford.

Comics scholarship, still relatively undeveloped in comparison to other media, was almost non-existent in 1971, when Gifford published his first book on comics history, Discovering Comics. At that time, no comprehensive archive of British comics existed, no fully researched cataloguing had been attempted, the mass pulping of comics in Britain in the 1940s meant that many issues and even titles were lost without effective records, no university courses were dedicated to the study of the medium, and serious research and debate had not taken place into the origin and development of the comic as a form. Gifford was determined that the comic should gain a credibility in mainstream culture and academia which it already possessed in continental Europe, and to a lesser extent the US: "Curiously, only Great Britain, where the comic paper was born, takes its comics for what they superficially seem – ephemera to be discarded as soon as read." Although enthusiastic about comics of every era, Gifford had a particular passion for vintage comics, "earlier in the medium's evolution, when it was a chaos of one-offs, irregular schedules, and a comic historian's nightmare of inept publishers operating from the back rooms of run-down bookshops on a shoe string budget."

=== The origin of the comic and early comics history ===
Gifford provided the first reliable, detailed account of early comics in works such as Victorian Comics (1976) and The British Comics Catalogue, 1874–1974 (1974), with a detailed overview in his International Book of Comics (1984). He also advanced debate on the origins of comics, including what the first comic and comic characters were, arguing that "there is no point [in the history of comics] where we can pick up a paper and declare it Comic Number One." He identified the first comedic narrative periodical, as an antecedent to the comic as The Comick Magazine (1796) which although all text included a single William Hogarth print per issue, which Gifford suggested when combined formed a "narrative sequence ... [so that] they could be described as an early form of comic strip." Gifford identified the significant stage of "the first continuing cartoon hero" as Rowlandson's Dr Syntax in the serial The Schoolmaster's Tour in The Poetical Magazine (1 May 1809). He argued that "in Europe, perhaps the world" the first caricature magazine, an important prototypical form of the comic, was Hopkirk's The Glasgow Looking Glass (11 June 1825).

Gifford located the origin of the modern graphic narrative in the late nineteenth century, tracing development through various stages that included Judy - The London Serio-Comic Journal (1 May 1867) featuring Ally Sloper, the first recurring character in a text and picture serial. He observed in Victorian Comics that Sloper "was the first to appear in comic book format ... a paperback reprint collection ... the first to have his own comic paper ... and was the longest lived [character] in comic history." He suggested a key contender as the first comic as being the paper Funny Folks (12 December 1874), which had an unprecedented half-picture, half-text per page layout. Sloper's debut was certainly a series of panels, but it lacks "interdependence as a sequential narrative strategy" with images each relaying a single joke without forming a narrative with other panels, and it lacked some key features of the form, such as the speech bubble, while it had accompanying text for each image. Debate continues, but Gifford's research and conclusions into the origins of comics as a medium have gained considerable academic acceptance.

=== Ally Sloper ===
Ally Sloper was championed by Gifford as the world's first ever comic character, and became a totemic figure for him, being revived and sometimes drawn by him in a number of comics and other publications that sought to ensure a modern readership had an awareness of early comic history. The Ally Sloper magazine was not a commercial success and lasted only four issues, but the innovation of Gifford's tone in the title was acknowledged by one cultural historian as "[w]ith his accurate spoof of the style of traditional British humour comics ... anticipat[ing] Viz by nearly three years." He produced artwork for advertisements for an Ally Sloper T-shirt, which was published in several Alan Class Comics titles in 1976, to promote the Ally Sloper magazine. Gifford also initiated the Ally Sloper Awards in 1976, an annual prize for veteran comic artists.

At a summit on comics history convened by the 1989 Lucca Comics Festival in Italy, Gifford was invited to be one of the eleven 'international specialists' to sign a declaration that The Yellow Kid was the first comic character having been first published in 1895. Gifford signed, but pointedly did so in the name of Ally Sloper, first published in 1867.

=== Historical classification of British comics ===
Gifford sought to draw a distinct definition for British comics history, as the Golden Age and other historical eras of comics were first defined to describe US comics history. These eras relate to UK comics only as a result of American influence on the UK market and creators, and do not acknowledge key differences in British comics of the period, notably the preponderance in Britain of humorous anthologies rather than the genre titles, most especially superheroes, that predominated in the US. Gifford observed that the "Thirties were the Golden Age of British comics" due to the profusion of successful, high quality and specifically British humour comics beginning in the 1930s, including D.C. Thomson's The Dandy (4 December 1937), The Beano (30 July 1938) and Magic (22 July 1939) and Amalgamated Press's Jingles (1934), Jolly (1935), Golden (23 October 1937), Radio Fun (15 October 1938), Happy Days (8 October 1938) and Knockout (4 March 1939). The start of the Second World War in 1939, and the resulting paper shortages, marked the end of many of the titles, a definable end to the era and the beginning of what Gifford termed the "Dark Age".

Gifford's Ally Sloper #1, his 1976 attempt to find a modern audience for the character he argued was the world's first in comics

=== Comics Catalogue and Price Guide ===
Gifford's The British Comics Catalogue, 1874–1974 (1974) was the first comprehensive index of British comics, and his later British Comics, Story Papers, Picture Libraries, Girls Papers, American Reprints, Facsmilies, Giveaways Price Guide (1982) the first attempt to offer a price guide for British comics (US comic books had been covered by The Overstreet Comic Book Price Guide since 1970). It was the antecedent of works such as the Official Comic Book Price Guide for Great Britain (1989).

=== Resistance to adult themes in children's comics ===
Gifford had a particular interest in children's comics. Although his collection included 1960s underground comics, the alternative comics of the 1970s as well as the more experimental mainstream of comics' Modern Age, he was not initially convinced by changing conceptions of comics as a medium suited to addressing adult themes such as sexuality, violence and storytelling techniques influenced by literary fiction, cinema and art. He recognised that the growth in adult readership of comics since the 1970s was due to nostalgia, but did not foresee the potential for a development of the medium. When children's comics began to reflect changes in cinema and mass culture, he was unafraid to speak out, even where this might involve constraints on the comics industry and creators.

After media outrage at the 1976 Look Out for Lefty strip about football hooliganism in the IPC comic Action, Gifford controversially drew parallels with the Wertham censorship of the US comics industry in the 1950s, remarking that "Perhaps its time we had another outcry against products like Action. Action is a new kind of comic geared to the lowest form of behaviour in children. Just as pornography caters for a mass market for adults, stuff like this provides violence for a mass market of children. As far as the people who produce Action are concerned, the children are simply a market and moral considerations do not apply." Despite 2000 AD (#1 published in 1977) producing iconic characters and innovative and critically acclaimed storyelling and art, Gifford had similar reservations about its violent content: "Whether children would actually enjoy living in [the future] ... is another matter, for as depicted ... the future is a world of unrelieved violence." Gifford was clear that his preferences in comics writing and art were informed by his nostalgia for UK comics of the 1930s, reflecting that "I look back to the days of my youth ... when comics were things of joy and pleasure, rather than blood and guts."

However, Gifford's concerns were limited to comics intended for children and adolescents, and he was well aware of a development of the medium for an adult audience. He collected and was able to appreciate the content of underground and Modern Age comics, offering sophisticated and sometimes sympathetic analysis. Gifford's own Ally Sloper comic (1976) offered a combination of vintage and alternative strips for an adult audience, although the nostalgic strips were his primary interest.

=== The Dandy record challenge ===
Working for the Guinness Book of Records as a comics expert, Gifford had to qualify his recommendation that The Dandy be regarded as the world's oldest comic (first issue December 1937) after the entry was challenged in 1999. The first issue of Italian comics magazine Il Giornalino was cover dated 1 October 1924, US comic book Detective Comics (March 1937) began nine months earlier, and the Belgian comic magazine Spirou had more issues. Gifford admitted that "[i]t may be that we will have to insert the word British into the Guinness Book of Records to clarify the position."

== History and criticism of radio, television, music and music hall: 1971–89 ==
Gifford's work The Golden Age of Radio was the first reference guide to programmes, broadcasters and catchphrases of radio of the 1930s and 1940s, and remains an important source for researchers in radio history.

Gifford was working on a filmography and history of 1930s British television, but died before its completion.

== Career in television and radio: 1953–99 ==
Gifford wrote extensively for comedy and light entertainment in both television and radio, his work often reflecting his fascinations of radio and film nostalgia and cartoon art.

=== Television and radio scriptwriting ===
Gifford wrote the first television series of comedy stars Morecambe and Wise, Running Wild (1954), having been brought in with fellow cartoonist, comic enthusiast and film buff Tony Hawes to save a series which was initially panned by critics. He also provided material for the opening night of ITV (1955) and co-wrote the first comedy show to be screened by BBC2, the TV movie Alberts' Channel Too (1964), for the launch of the channel, although the whole evening's broadcasting was lost due to a power blackout. He wrote for Junior Showtime (1973), devised the nostalgia panel show Looks Familiar (1970–87) for Thames TV, presented by Denis Norden, its radio counterpart Sounds Familiar and the Thames quiz show Quick on the Draw (1974–1979) featuring drawings by cartoonists and celebrities, with presenters including Bob Monkhouse, Rolf Harris and Bill Tidy. Gifford also wrote scripts for the ITV children's puppet shows Witches' Brew (1973) and The Laughing Policeman (1974). Gifford also designed stunts for the popular BBC1 game show The Generation Game.

The scriptwriting partnership with Hawes began in radio, for weekly BBC concert party The Light Optimists (1953) and continued with stunt devising for the US-bought game show People Are Funny for Radio Luxembourg.

=== Television and radio broadcasting ===
A broadcaster in his own right, Gifford featured in numerous television and radio programmes as an expert in the history of film, radio and comics, as well as appearances in a variety of documentary and news magazine programmes over several decades. Appearances included editions of BBC's On The Braden Beat (1964) commenting on comics, Granada's Clapperboard (1974) and a review of forthcoming horror films for BBC1's Film 1973 (1973), Goon but not Forgotten, a radio history of The Goon Show as part of the Laughter in the Air: The Story of Radio Comedy (1979) and twice as guest panellist for the BBC Radio 4 panel show Quote... Unquote (1985).

Gifford and Monkhouse reprised their partnership with BBC radio programmes for the history of the comics, Sixpence for a Superman (1999) on British comics, and the two-part A Hundred Laughs for a Ha'penny (1999), a history of comic papers.

== Obituaries: 1992–2000 ==
Gifford also regularly wrote obituaries of notable figures in comics, film and entertainment history for British national newspapers The Independent and The Guardian and posthumously for the Oxford Dictionary of National Biography, drawing on his specialist knowledge and often personal familiarity with the subject. His output was prolific and constant, with his own obituary in The Guardian noting that "[h]is last commission was phoned in from his home in Sydenham, south London, to his editor on Thursday, May 18; it is thought he died the same day."

== Collection of comics and other popular media ==
Gifford's most valuable research resource was his own collection, as in over sixty years he had accumulated what is generally recognised as the largest comic collection in the UK and the largest collection of British comics in the world, including the only known complete runs of all comics published in the UK in the 1940s. He collected the first and last issues of all comics published in the UK, as well as Christmas issues and other special editions, and also collected first issues of US comics. To a lesser extent, first issues of comics from other countries were also collected. Gifford was also a collector of other ephemera, including pulp books, popular magazines, theatrical programmes, film and comic fanzines, original film scripts and sheet music, as well as pop culture memorabilia, describing himself as "the keeper of the nation's nostalgia". and with a collection that included periodicals not to be found in the British Library.

It was an obsession which dominated both his life and his South London home, once described in a colour supplement interview as the den of "a boy who had run away from home" and never returned. A reliable figure was never established for the size of his collection, but its scale constrained movement throughout the house and extended into every room, even the kitchen: "There are comics on the stove, on the fridge, on the floor. Denis Gifford can still use his grill, but roasts are a memory for he can no longer open his oven. The fridge filled up years ago, for Denis is fascinated by the free gifts that come with some comics ... There are lollipops in the fridge now, and Desperate Dan nougat."

Unusually for a collector, Gifford's interests were defined by their eclecticism, including comics, radio recordings and film from throughout the world and spanning from the origins of the media up to new releases. His own 'biog' for a 1975 book calculates his collection "extends to some 20,000 issues" but is careful to limit the estimate to the particularly British form of 'comic papers' which excluded his vast collection of American comic books, and in any case accumulated many more in the next 25 years of his life. He had certain specific interests, notably British horror films of the 1930s to the 1960s, early cinema and radio, Laurel and Hardy movies and memorabilia, British comic papers of the late nineteenth century and British and US comics of the 1920s, 1930s and 1940s, especially those which featured personalities from contemporary radio. However, the parameters of his interests and collection broadened substantially throughout his life.

Gifford's collection had suffered an early setback, an anecdote related by Bob Monkhouse: "You cannot begin to imagine his grief when he completed his National Service to return home to find that his mother had thrown away his huge collection of Film Fun, The Joker, Merry and Bright and a dozen other titles ... Denis was to spend the rest of his life trying to replace those lost copies." Gifford's mother was later to express deep regret at their destruction.

Despite his hopes that his vast collection might form the basis of a national museum of comics, through an archive such as the Victoria and Albert Museum National Art Library Comics and Comic Art Collection, it was broken up and auctioned off after his death, "leaving 12 tons of paper at his home to be cleared and sorted." Monkhouse reflected in the foreword to auction catalogue of The Denis Gifford Collection on how one "whose researches were so meticulous have allowed this vast gathering of treasures to have swollen into such unruly and uncatalogued confusion". The sale was described in the auction pamphlet as "surely the largest private collection of annuals, books, cartoons, cinema history, comics, ephemera & original artwork ever to come on the market. The collection, housed in some 600 boxes and weighing ten tons, arrived on a groaning lorry and took five men nearly three hours to unload. We expect sales to run to some 4000 lots."

Gifford's collection reflects his lifelong interest in comics and popular culture, while his extensive research sought to document aspects of popular culture that had received comparatively little scholarly attention. He was particularly interested in obscure examples of vintage comics, film, television, and radio, especially during early decades of his research, when such material was often overlooked by academic studies. His work aimed to identify, document and preserve these examples before surviving copies were lost.

== Comic fandom: fanzines and conventions ==
Gifford was a pivotal figure in the development of comics "fandom" in the UK, first through his writing and publishing of early fanzines in the 1950s.

In the 1970s he helped introduce comics conventions to the UK, events where creators and industry figures could meet and respond to comics fans. It was a significant progression of the already established comics marts where comics were simply sold, and in which Gifford was a key figure. He was the only comics industry guest at an early meeting of Britain's major comics convention, Comicon 74/Comic Mart Summer Special 1974, where he provided the introductory presentation.

Gifford organised Comics 101 in 1976, the first convention dedicated to British comic creators, with guests including celebrated figures in British comics including Frank Hampson, Leo Baxendale, Frank Bellamy and Ron Embleton, Marvelman creator Mick Anglo and Garth creator Steve Dowling, Gifford conducting an on-stage interview with Dowling. The name of the convention was a reference to the 101 years since the first issue of Funny Folks (1874) which Gifford regarded as the first comic.

In 1977 Gifford co-founded the Society of Strip Illustration, a network for all those involved in any stage of the creative process of comics production which later became the Comic Creators Guild. In 1978 he established the Association of Comics Enthusiasts, whose newsletter Comic Cuts ran for 14 years proper and, as a section of UK comics fanzine The Illustrated Comics Journal, until his death. Gifford also wrote extensively for comics magazines and fanzines, particularly Comic Cuts, and it was here that he wrote some of his most specialist work on comics history and criticism.

Prizegiving of the first Ally Sloper Awards for comic creators also took place at Comics 101, with Bob Monkhouse presenting.

Gifford continued to organise, guest and attend comics conventions throughout the 1970s, 80s and 90s in the UK, USA and throughout Europe, including regular guest appearances the Lucca International Comics Festival, was an official guest at the first UK Comic Art Convention (UKCAC) in 1985 and was a guest speaker at the 1st UK Paperback and Pulp Bookfair in 1991.

== Ally Sloper Awards ==
Gifford created the Ally Sloper Awards, a series of awards to recognise veteran British comics artists. The award was first presented in 1976, but no longer runs.

== See also ==
- Comics art and writing of Denis Gifford
- Published work on cinema by Denis Gifford
- Publications by Denis Gifford on radio, television, music and music hall
- The British Film Catalogue
- Ally Sloper Award
- Streamline (character)
