= Published work on cinema by Denis Gifford =

- Born: Denis Gifford; 26 December 1927
- Died: 18 May 2000 (aged 72)
- Occupation: Film historian
- Writing career
- Genre: Film history
- Subjects: British cinema, early cinema, horror

In addition to published work on cinema, this article also includes Denis Gifford's film credits.

Denis Gifford provided one of the earliest researched archives of early cinema, with The British Film Catalogue, 1895–1970, and produced numerous authoritative works on previously uncatalogued films from the UK and the US. Gifford had a particular interest in early horror and science fiction, and early comedy including Laurel and Hardy.

== Books on cinema ==
Gifford's Karloff: the Man, the Monster, the Movies, a biography of iconic Frankenstein actor Boris Karloff.

Gifford's work on cinema included both original research on cinema, such as The British Film Catalogue, 1895–1970 and British Animated Films, 1895–1985: a Filmography, which has considerable academic credibility, and more popular, heavily illustrated books, often on genre films, such as Movie Monsters.

- Space Patrol Official Handbook (1952); self-published.
- British Cinema: an Illustrated Guide to the Leading Players and Directors (1968); Zwemmer. ISBN 0-302-00484-X
- Movie Monsters (1969); Studio Vista/ Dutton. ISBN 0-289-79701-2
- Science Fiction Film (1971); Studio Vista/ Dutton. ISBN 0-289-70004-3
- Karloff: The Man, the Monster, the Movies (1973); Curtis Film Series.
- The British Film Catalogue, 1895–1970 (1973); David & Charles. ISBN 0-7153-5572-4
- A Pictorial History of Horror Movies (1973); Hamlyn. ISBN 0-600-36926-9
- The Armchair Odeon: The Collector's Guide to the Movies (1974); Fountain Press. ISBN 0-85242-387-X
- Chaplin: the Movie Makers (1974); Doubleday. ISBN 0-385-01123-7
- The Illustrated Who's Who of British Films (1979); Batsford. ISBN 0-7134-1434-0
- British Film Animation, 1920–80: Exhibition Catalogue (1980) (ed. Denis Gifford and David R. Williams). ISBN 0-9501926-2-7
- The British Film Catalogue (2nd edition: 1895–1985) (1986); David & Charles. ISBN 0-7153-8835-5
- The Great British Picture Show (1987); Facts on File.
- British Animated Films, 1895–1985: a Filmography (1988), McFarland & Co. ISBN 0-89950-241-5
- The Comic Art of Charlie Chaplin: a Graphic Celebration of Chaplin's Centenary (1989), Hawk Books (co-written with Mike Higgs). ISBN 0-948248-21-1
- American Animated Films: The Silent Era, 1897–1929 (1990); McFarland & Co. ISBN 0-89950-460-4
- Books and Plays in Films, 1896–1915: Literary, Theatrical and Artistic Sources of the First Twenty Years of Motion Pictures (1991); McFarland & Co. ISBN 0-89950-650-X
- Things, Its and Aliens! Lobby Card Posters from Sci-Fi Shockers! (1991); H.C. Blossom. ISBN 1-872532-58-6
- Mad Doctors, Monsters and Mummies! : Lobby Card Postcards from Hollywood Horrors! (1991); H.C. Blossom. ISBN 1-872532-71-3
- The British Film Catalogue (3rd edition: 1895–1994) (1994); Routledge. ISBN 1-57958-200-1
- Entertainers in British Films: A Century of Showbiz in the Cinema (1998); Greenwood Press. ISBN 0-313-30720-2
- King Kong and Co!: The Films of Edgar Wallace (1998); Flick Books. ISBN 0-948911-14-X

== Contributions on cinema ==
The Edgar Allan Poe Scrapbook, to which Gifford contributed the chapter Pictures of Poe: A Survey of the Silent Film Era 1909–1929.

- Pictures of Poe: A Survey of the Silent Film Era 1909–1929; in The Edgar Allan Poe Scrapbook (ed. Peter Haining, chapter Pictures of Poe: A Survey of the Silent Film Era 1909–1929 by Denis Gifford) (1977); London: David & Charles; p. 131. ISBN 0-8052-0583-7
- My Funny Frankenstein; in The Frankenstein File (ed. Peter Haining) (1977); Los Angeles: New English Library. ISBN 0-450-03305-8
- The Man Who Did Work Miracles-in the Movies; in The H.G. Wells Scrapbook (ed. Peter Haining) (1978); Los Angeles: New English Library. ISBN 0-450-03778-9
- Charlie Chaplin: The Man Behind the Genius ... A Compilation; in Reader's Digest, Vol. 112, issue #673 (May 1978) - compiled comments of Denis Gifford, Theodore Huff, Joe Pollack, Roger Manvell, Alistair Cooke, J. Y. Smith, Gerold Frank, and Max Eastman.
- The Octopus Encyclopaedia of Horror (ed. Richard Davis, The Catalogue chapter co-written by Denis Gifford and Richard Davis) (1981); New York: Crown Publishing Group. ISBN 99975-473-2-2
- Félix le Chat: 1923–24 (by Pat Sullivan, preface by Denis Gifford) (1982, English translation 2004); Pierre Horay. ISBN 2-7058-0114-6
- The Aurum Film Encyclopedia: Science Fiction (review(s) for, ed. Phil Hardy) (1984); London: Kobal Collection. ISBN 1-85410-382-2
- The Encyclopaedia of Science Fiction Movies (co-author Phil Hardy) (1986); Woodbury Press. ISBN 0-8300-0436-X
- Fitz: The Old Man of the Screen; in All Our Yesterdays: 90 Years of British Cinema (ed. Charles Barr) (1986); London: British Film Institute. ISBN 0-85170-179-5
- Filmography: Gainsborough and Related Films 1924–1950, in Gainsborough Pictures - Rethinking British Cinema (ed. Pam Cook)(1997); London: Cassell. ISBN 0-304-33707-2
- King Kong Cometh! : the Evolution of the Great Ape (ed. Paul A. Woods, Chapter 5: The Lost World, reprinted from A Pictorial History of Horror Movies, and Chapter 10: The King of Kongs, reprinted from A Pictorial History of Horror Movies by Denis Gifford) (2005); London: Plexus. ISBN 0-85965-362-5

== Articles and interviews on cinema ==
Gifford's involvement in cinema fanzines dates back to the early 1950s, and he continued to write for the fan press well into the 1980s, long after he was well established, in large-circulation magazines such as House of Hammer. Gifford also conducted a large number of recorded interviews with vintage showbusiness figures, including actors and filmmakers, intended for personal reference. Many of these are now kept as an archive by the BFI.

House of Hammer #2 from December 1976, the start of Gifford's long-running columns on vintage horror, Golden Age of Horror and History of Hammer.

- Film Review: Flight to Mars; in Straight Up; issue #3 (May 1952). - British fanzine.
- Convention Projections; in Straight Up; issue #4 (July 1952). - British fanzine.
- Denis Gifford's Projections; in Straight Up; issue #5 (October 1952). - British fanzine.
- Who do You Think You are Fooling Mr Hitler?; in The Movie (no available date).
- The Sherlock Holmes Series of 1954; in Amateur Cine World (1966) (repr. In The Armchair Odeon (1974)) - reviews in British fanzine of The Case of the Unlucky Gambler, The Case of the Christmas Pudding, The Case of the Haunted Gainsborough.
- On Screen: Mr Laurel Meets Mr Hardy; in Amateur Cine World; Vol. 11, issue #6 (1966). - Review in British fanzine.
- Nolan's Edgar Wallace; in Films in Review; Vol. 18, issue #5 (1967), p. 313–16. - Review in US magazine.
- Laurel & Hardy; in Classic Film Collector; issue #21 (Summer 1968).
- The Latter Days of Laurel & Hardy; in Classic Film Collector; issue #22 (Fall/Winter 1968).
- Chrissie White interview (1968) - audio recorded interview.
- Pimple; in The Silent Picture; issue #6 (Spring 1970), ISSN 0037-5209. - interview with Joe Evans, US magazine.
- Science Fiction Film; in Film Fan Monthly; issue #120 (June 1971). - US fanzine.
- B-Movies; in Rex; issue #26 (October 1971). - British magazine.
- The Reel Image; in Movie Maker (November 1971). - review of Nyoka in the Caves of Death, Abbott and Costello Meet the Mummy and the Wolfman.
- Lunar-tics; in Rex; issue #28 (December 1971). - British magazine, Laurel & Hardy article.
- Woody Woodpecker shoots to the top of the cartoon tree; in The Guardian (4 July 1972, reprinted 4 July 2014). - interview with Walter Lantz, Woody Woodpecker creator at Zagreb Film Festival.
- Diary of the first World Festival of Animated Films at Zagreb; in Film Fan Monthly; issue #133–134 (July/August 1972). - US fanzine.
- The Reel Image; in Movie Maker; Vol. 6, issue #11 (November 1972). - review of 8mm print of It's a Grand Life.
- (Unknown article); in Movie Maker (March 1973) Vol. 7, issue #9, p. 600–601 (September 1973).
- (Unknown article title); Films Illustrated; Vol. 5 issue #49 p. 24–25 (September 1975). - Report on the Annecy Festival of 1975.
- Things aren't what they used to be!; in Ghoul; issue #1 (1976). - British horror magazine, article on horror films of the 1940s.
- Terry Wakefield: Film Funster; Ally Sloper comic magazine; Vol. 1, issue #2 (1976).
- (Unknown article title); The Laurel and Hardy Magazine; (unknown issue) (1970s, no date).
- The Golden Age of Horror (column) and History of Hammer (column); in House of Hammer; issue #2 - #22 (December 1976 – July 1978). - British film horror magazine.
- (Unknown article title); in Famous Monsters of Filmland; issue #133 - #134 (April - May 1977).
- "Ten Days of Terror" (article on the Sitges Film Festival); in Hammer's Halls of Horror (formerly House of Hammer); issue #23 (August 1978).
- Article on the Crazy Gang in Radio Times issue #3136 (17–30 December 1983). - Ties in with broadcast of The Crazy Gang: a Celebration.
- Flavour of the Month (column); in Films and Filming; various issues (1984). - British fanzine.
  - Buster Keaton; in Films and Filming; issue #338 (?) (February 1984).
  - Abbott and Costello; in Films and Filming; issue #342 (June 1984).
  - Laurel and Hardy; in Films and Filming; issue #346(?) (October 1984).
  - (unknown article title); in Films & Filming; issue #366 (March 1985). - on British animation artist Charles Harrison 'Joe' Noble.
- Hi, Gang!; in Film Season Publicity Programme - Made in London - 15th Season (1988); The Museum of London/ National Film Archive. - includes NFT note on radio programme 'Hi, Gang' by Denis Gifford.
- The Early Memories of Maurice Elvey; in Griffithiania; issue #60–61; p. 117–119 (October 1997).

== Obituaries of cinematic figures ==
Gifford was a regular obituarist for British newspapers The Independent and The Guardian. As well as specialising in the obituaries of film actors, screenwriters, producers and animators, Gifford also wrote many obituaries of comic creators and figures from television, radio and music hall.

- George McFarland; The Independent (Saturday 3 July 1993).
- Joe De Rita; The Independent (Saturday 10 July 1993).
- Martin Kosleck; The Independent (Friday 4 February 1994).
- Nick Cravat; The Independent (Wednesday 23 March 1994).
- Jack Hannah; The Independent (7 July 1994).
- Iris Adrian; The Independent (Tuesday 4 October 1994).
- Benny Baker; The Independent (Monday 10 October 1994).
- John Halas; The Independent (Wednesday 25 January 1995).
- Nancy O'Neill; The Independent (Friday 17 March 1995).
- Friz Freleng; The Independent (Monday 29 May 1995).
- Grady Sutton; The Independent (Tuesday 26 September 1995).
- Jeffrey Lynn; The Independent (Tuesday 28 November 1995).
- Shamus Culhane; The Independent; 6 February 1996.
- Ed Love; The Independent (Monday 20 May 1996).
- Virgil Ross; The Independent (Sunday 26 May 1996).
- Adriana Caselotti; The Independent (Monday 10 February 1997).
- Harry Love; The Independent (Tuesday 18 March 1997). - Krazy Kat and Disney writer/director
- Roy Rolland; The Guardian (Tuesday 26 August 1997).
- Peter Noble; The Independent (Friday 29 August 1997).
- Lillian Disney; The Independent (Friday 19 December 1997).
- Mae Questel; The Independent (Monday 12 January 1998).
- F. Maurice Speed, The Independent (Friday 11 September 1998).
- Jack Watson; The Independent (Friday 9 July 1999). (co-written with Tom Vallance)
- Peter Jones; The Independent (Wednesday 12 April 2000).
- William Hanna; The Guardian (Saturday 24 March 2001).
- Maurice Denham: Actor of Many Characters and Voices; The Independent (Friday 26 July 2002).
- John Halas (1912–1995); The Oxford Dictionary of National Biography; Oxford University Press.
- Val Guest; The Independent (Monday 15 May 2006).
- Joe Barbera; The Guardian (Wednesday 20 December 2006) (revised after Gifford's death in 2000).
- Typed obituary for Lewin Fitzhamon; box 135; item 4; Denis Gifford Collection; BFI film collections (unpublished).

== Biographic details of early cinematic figures ==
- Richard J. Appleton; Who's Who of Victorian Cinema (co-written with Richard Brown).
- James Stuart Blackton; Who's Who of Victorian Cinema.
- Walter Booth; Who's Who of Victorian Cinema.
- Alfred Claude Bromhead; Who's Who of Victorian Cinema.
- George Howard Cricks; Who's Who of Victorian Cinema.
- T.P. Crowther; Who's Who of Victorian Cinema.
- Frank Harvey Haydon and George Urry; Who's Who of Victorian Cinema.
- Tom Merry (William Mecham); Who's Who of Victorian Cinema.
- Jasper Redfern; Who's Who of Victorian Cinema.
- Joseph, William, Herbert, Arnold and Bernard Riley.
- Albany Ward (Hannam Edward Bonnor); Who's Who of Victorian Cinema.

Biographic details may have been fully or partially published earlier in Gifford's The Illustrated Who's Who in British Films (1978).

== Film credits ==
In addition to writing extensively on cinema history, Gifford also scripted, directed and photographed a number of newsreel, information and commercial short films.

- Inserting a Damp-proof Course (1963) - photography.
- The Handy Manns (1963) - script (with Bob Monkhouse).
- Channel 99 (1963)
- Modern Methods of Underground Pipelaying (1963) - director.
- The Magic Stamps (1963) - director.
- Highlight: the Singing Cinema (1964) - producer, director.
- A Sporting Year (1964) - director.
- The Building Research Station Hot Stage Microscope (1964) - director.
- Single Stack Drainage and its Application to Tall Buildings (1965) - director.
- Battery Casting on Site (1966) - photography.
- Fire Test on Structural Concrete Beams (1967) - photography.
- To be continued ... (1990), - contributor (third programme in series comics - the ninth art.).

== Books about Denis Gifford and film ==
- Super Sci-Fi; Monster Times #14 (31 July 1972) - review of Science Fiction Film
- The Animator's Bookshelf; Animator magazine; #23 (Summer 1988) - Review of British Animated Films, 1895–1985: A Filmography.
- The Lost Continent: Denis Gifford's British Animated Films, 1895–1985: A Filmography. - a series of blog posts exploring Gifford's British Animated Films, 1895–1985: A Filmography by eras.
- A New World of Gods & Monsters – the books of Denis Gifford by Tom Woodger; in 70s Monster Memories (2015).

== See also ==
- Comics art and writing of Denis Gifford
- Publications by Denis Gifford on radio, television, music and music hall
- The British Film Catalogue
- Streamline (character)
- Ally Sloper Award
