= Publications by Denis Gifford on radio, television, music and music hall =

Overview of publications by Denis Gifford on radio, television, music and music hall

- Born: Denis Gifford; 26 December 1927
- Died: 18 May 2000 (aged 72)
- Writing career
- Subjects: 20th century radio, television, music hall history

In addition to published work, this article also includes Denis Gifford's radio and television credits.

== Books on radio, television, music and music hall ==
- Run Adolf Run: The World War Two Fun Book (1975), Corgi. ISBN 0-552-99971-7.
- Stewpot's Fun Book (Look-in books) (1977), Arrow. ISBN 0-09-915490-0.
- The Morecambe & Wise Comic Book (1977), Corgi / Carousel. ISBN 0-552-52078-0.
- Quick on the Draw (1978), Arrow /ITV paperback. (with Chas Sinclair.) ISBN 0-099-18820-1.
- Eric and Ernie's TV Fun Book (1978), Arrow / ITV paperback. ISBN 0-09-919010-9.
- The Golden Age of Radio: An Illustrated Companion (1985), B.T. Batsford. ISBN 0-7134-4234-4.
- Bless 'Em All!: World War Two Song Book (1989), Webb & Bower. ISBN 0-86350-355-1.
- The British Television Catalogue, 1923-39: A Chronological Programme Listing and Index (1999), Flicks Books. ISBN 0-948-91130-1.

== Articles on radio, music and music hall ==
- For Whom the Gong Bong-g-gs; in Rex issue #25, (September 1971) - article on vintage radio for British magazine.
- Fifty Years of Radio Comedy; in New English Library Flashback Magazine (1972).
- Stewpot's News Desk; in Look-in issue #26 (23 June 1979).
- Article on the Crazy Gang in Radio Times issue #3136 (17–30 December 1983).

== Obituaries of figures from radio and television ==
- Ben Warriss; The Independent (Monday 18 January 1993)
- Denny Willis; The Independent (Thursday 20 April 1993)
- Freddie Sales; The Independent (Tuesday 6 December 1994)
- Stewart MacPherson; The Independent (Saturday 29 April 1995)
- Harold Berens; The Independent (Saturday 13 May 1995)
- Barbara Lyon; The Independent (Saturday 22 July 1995)
- Dick Bentley; The Independent (Wednesday 30 August 1995)
- Grady Sutton; The Independent (Tuesday 26 September 1995)
- Jimmy Jewel; The Independent (Tuesday 5 December 1995)
- Wallas Eaton; The Independent (Saturday 9 December 1995)
- Benny Lee; The Independent (Saturday 30 December 1995)
- Percy Edwards; The Independent (Monday 10 June 1996)
- Alfred Marks; The Independent (2 July 1996)
- Les Allen; The Independent (Monday 5 August 1996)
- Norman Hackforth; The Independent (Wednesday 18 December 1996)
- Harry Davis; The Independent (Saturday 8 February 1997)
- Hughie Green; The Independent (Monday 5 May 1997)
- Charlie Chester; The Independent (Friday 27 June 1997)
- Peter Noble; The Independent (Friday 29 August 1997)
- Henny Youngman; The Independent (Thursday 26 February 1998)
- Patricia Hayes; The Independent (Monday 21 September 1998)
- Johnny Speight; The Independent (1998)
- Ken Platt; The Independent (Saturday 3 October 1998)
- Robin Ray; The Independent (Monday 30 November 1998)
- Anthea Askey; The Independent (Friday 5 March 1999)
- John L. Goldwater; The Independent (Saturday 27 March 1999)
- Jean Vander Pyl; The Independent (Thursday 22 April 1999)
- Chan Canasta; The Independent (Monday 31 May 1999)
- Peter Brough; The Independent (Monday 7 June 1999)
- Len Lowe; The Independent (Wednesday 8 September 1999)
- Lew Schwarz; The Independent (Thursday 9 September 1999)
- Deryck Guyler; The Independent (Monday 11 October 1999)
- Peter Dulay; The Independent (Tuesday 9 November 1999)
- Ian Messiter; The Independent (Friday 26 November 1999)
- George Elrick; The Independent (Friday 17 December 1999)
- Marjorie Anderson; The Independent (Monday 20 December 1999)
- Jean Metcalfe; The Independent (Monday 31 January 2000)
- Peter Jones; The Independent (Wednesday 12 April 2000)
- Johnnie Riscoe; The Independent (Thursday 20 April 2000)
- Diana Darvey; The Independent (Saturday 27 May 2000)
- Barry Took; The Independent (Monday 1 April 2002)

== Obituaries of figures from music and music hall ==
- Ben Wariss; The Independent (Monday 18 January 1993).
- Pinky Lee; The Independent (Tuesday 13 April 1993).
- Nat Mills; The Independent (Saturday 14 August 1993).
- Nick Cravat; The Independent (23 March 1994).
- Denny Willis; The Independent (Thursday 20 April 1995).
- Tessie O'Shea; The Independent (Tuesday 25 April 1995).
- Barbara Lyon; The Independent (Saturday 22 July 1995).
- Alan Kane; The Independent (31 August 1996).
- Margery Manners; The Independent (Friday 1 May 1997).
- Dennis Castle; The Independent (Thursday 26 February 1998).
- Dorothy Squires; The Independent (April 1998).
- Syd Lawrence; The Independent (Thursday 7 May 1998).
- Johnny Johnston; The Independent (Friday 12 June 1998).
- Betty Marsden (co-writer Barry Took); The Independent (July 1998).
- Robin Richmond; The Independent (Saturday 8 August 1998).
- Eve Boswell; The Independent (Saturday 15 August 1998).
- Serge Ganjou; The Independent (Friday 22 January 1999).
- Frankie Vaughan; The Independent (Saturday 18 September 1999).
- Joe Church; The Independent (8 October 1999).
- Josef Locke; The Independent (16 October 1999).
- Elsie (Florence) Waters (1893–1990); Oxford Dictionary of National Biography; Oxford University Press (2004).
- Charlie Drake; The Independent (26 December 2006).

== Recorded interviews ==
Gifford conducted a large number of interviews with figures from radio and television, several of which have been compiled as part of the BECTU (the British trade union for those working in broadcasting, film, theatre, entertainment, leisure, interactive media and allied areas) History Project.

- Mike Craig (2000)
- Esther Harris (2000)
- Arnold Louis Miller (2000)
- Brad Ashton (1999)
- David Meeker (1999)
- Philip Jones (1999)
- Stanley A. Long (1999)
- John M. East (1999)
- Ray Herbert (1999)
- Ernest Dudley (1999)

== Radio credits ==
- The Light Optimists (1953); BBC. - Co-writer (with Tony Hawes).
- People are Funny (1950s); Radio Luxemburg. - Stunt deviser (with Tony Hawes).
- Sounds Familiar (1964). - Deviser.
- Laughter in the Air: The Story of Radio Comedy; Part 7: Goon But Not Forgotten (13 February 1979); BBC Radio 4. - Compiler/writer.
- The Cat's Whisker - history of radio programming
- Quote Unquote (1985); BBC Radio 4. - Guest panellist.
- What a Geezer (1987). - Writer/co-presenter of biographical programme on radio personality Harold Berens.
- Sixpence for a Superman (1999); BBC. - Co-writer, presenter (with Bob Mokhouse).
- A Hundred Laughs for a Ha'penny (1999); BBC. - Co-writer, presenter (with Bob Monkhouse).

== Television credits ==
- Running Wild (1954); BBC. - Co-writer (with Tony Hawes), 3 episodes.
- Alberts Channel Too (21 April 1964); BBC2. - Co-writer (with Tom Parkinson).
- On The Braden Beat (1964); ITV. - Presenter.
- Junior Showtime: Junior Showtime Compilation (no date, c. 1970); ITV. - Script.
- Looks Familiar (1972–87); ITV. - Writer/deviser.
- Junior Showtime: Babes in the Wood (1973); ITV.
- Film 1973 (1973); BBC1. - Writer/presenter.
- The Golden Shot: The Golden Shot excerpt (1973). - On-screen participant, in programme about comics.
- Witches' Brew (1973); ITV. - Writer, children's puppet show.
- The Laughing Policeman (1974); ITV. - Writer, children's puppet show.
- Clapperboard (30 December 1974); ITV (Granada). - Guest appearance.
- Film 1974 (1974); BBC1. - Writer/presenter.
- Quick on the Draw (1974-1979); ITV. - Deviser.
- Looks Familiar Special (1978); ITV. - Deviser/compiler.
- Film Buff of the Year: Who Knows Most About the Movies (1981). - On-screen participant.
- Two of a Kind (1982); ITV. - Compiler.
- Looks Familiar: Alice Faye (1983); ITV. - Deviser/compiler.
- The Crazy Gang: a Celebration (22 December 1983) - Deviser and compiler.
- Ernie Wise's Elstree Film Fun (1985); BBC - Writer and compiler,
- Wogan: Wogan's Radio Fun (1987); BBC1. - Programme consultant, 2-part programme.
- Cinema Europe: The Other Hollywood - Episode 1: Where it All Began (1995). - 'Grateful thanks' in TV documentary mini-series.

== See also ==
- Published work on cinema by Denis Gifford
- Comics art and writing of Denis Gifford
- The British Film Catalogue
