= Comic Mart =

Catchall term for a series of British comic book trade fairs

- Status: Defunct
- Genre: Comic books
- Venue: Comic Mart: Central Hall Westminster; Comicbook Marketplace: Lyndhurst Hall, Kentish Town
- Locations: London; offshoots in Birmingham, Manchester, Liverpool, and other cities
- Country: United Kingdom
- Inaugurated: 1972
- Most recent: c. 1998
- Organizer: Rob Barrow & Nick Landau (1972–1974); Nick Landau/Titan Distributors (1975–1977, 1979–1992); Rob Barrow/Fantasy Domain (1976–2011)

Comic Mart is the catchall term for a series of British comic book trade fairs which were held in the United Kingdom from 1972 until the early 1990s. The Comic Mart was one of the earliest recurring public comic events in the UK, predated only by the British Comic Art Convention. Comic Mart began in London, eventually expanding to Birmingham, Manchester, and Liverpool, among other locations. The first few Comic Marts were organized and produced by Rob Barrow and Nick Landau; eventually they split up to produce competing versions of the event, and were joined by other regional organizers.

Unlike comic book conventions, which typically featured publishers, creators, panel discussions, and other activities, Comic Marts (which were generally one-day affairs) were primarily organized around dealers selling comics to individual customers. The emphasis tended to be on hard-to-find American comics: Golden Age and Silver Age comics, as well as new titles, which were not distributed to the UK with any regularity in the early 1970s. As the marts became more popular, however, British comics professionals began to congregate and socialize at the shows and afterward in pubs nearby (such as The Westminster Arms).

== History ==
=== Dobson's "Mini-con" ===
The first so-called London comic mart was held in 1970, organized by "Godfather of British fandom" and publisher of the fanzine Fantasy Advertiser, Frank Dobson. Dobson and a small group of fellow comics dealers rented out the upstairs room of The Eagle pub in Clerkenwell on a Saturday and called it a "Mini-con." Dobson emigrated to Australia soon afterward, bequeathing Fantasy Advertiser to 19-year-old fellow comics enthusiast Dez Skinn.

=== Barrow and Landau ===
As inheritor of Dobson's interests, Skinn planned another mart for 9 December 1972 — dubbing it the "Christmas Comic Mart" — but discovered that Rob Barrow and Nick Landau had already arranged one, scheduled one week earlier than Skinn's. (Landau had produced the 5th annual British Comic Art Convention — which originated comics conventions in the UK — earlier in the year; Barrow was publisher of the fanzine Comic Fandom Bulletin.) Held on 2 December 1972, at Lyndhurst Hall, in Camden Town, Landau and Barrow's event was the first "official" Comic Mart, attracting over 250 attendees. Volunteers and sponsors of the first Comic Mart included Skinn, Phil Clarke, Mike Higgs, Stan Nichols, Derek Stokes, Richard Burton, Alan Austin, Colin Campbell, Dave Gibbons, Compendium Books, IT, Candida, Electric Cinema Club, Better Books, and Virgin Records.

Barrow and Landau's second London Comic Mart was held 24 February 1973, again at Lyndhurst Hall. Next up on the "convention schedule" was the British Comic Art Convention ("Comicon"), scheduled for the weekend of 21–22 July, at London's Regent Centre Hotel. Comicon, however, was abruptly canceled shortly before it was scheduled, but was salvaged by Landau and Barrow, who managed to put on a one-day version of the show on 22 July at Comicon's usual location of London's Waverley Hotel. A November Comic Mart made it the second one of 1973.

In 1974, Barrow and Landau expanded Comic Mart to become a more frequently held affair. The first Comic Mart of the year was held in January, followed by one on Saturday, 27 April, at Holborn Assembly Hall, John's Mews, in central London. The free show featured an evening fantasy film marathon, including showings of the serials Blackhawk and Flash Gordon, and the 1954 film Creature from the Black Lagoon. The 1974 edition of Comicon, again organized by Barrow (on his own), was held 20–21 July at London's Regent Centre Hotel, and was jointly billed as the "Comic Mart Summer Special 1974." Denis Gifford, a key figure in British comics fandom, was the only "industry guest" at this combined Comicon/Comic Mart, providing the introductory presentation. (From that point, Barrow took on the responsibility for the British Comic Art Convention, organizing that show for at least the next four years.) Subsequent 1974 Comic Marts were held in September, October, and December, also taking place at Holborn Assembly Hall.

Publisher/editor Martin Lock timed early issues of his fanzine Bemusing Magazine (later known as BEM) to coincide with Comic Mart, and sold each new issue to Comic Mart customers.

With Barrow focusing his energies on Comicon, in 1975 Landau continued the Comic Marts on his own. That year he produced three editions — in June, August, and November — with the August event being a two-day affair, held at Central Hall Westminster.

=== The split: Comic Mart vs. Comicbook Marketplace ===
Landau staged two Comic Marts in 1976, in early October and late November, both at London's Regent Centre Hotel. For the 3 October Comic Mart, an admission charge of 10 pence was levied (largely to discourage petty thieves, who had been making a nuisance of themselves). The largest of the two events took up 6,700 square feet and featured 110 dealer tables. Meanwhile, Rob Barrow (using his corporate entity Fantasy Domain, established in 1972), returned to the "mart scene" in mid-November, organizing a separate "more intimate" mart, entitled "Rob Barrow's Comic Book Marketplace," at Lyndhurst Hall.

Landau staged seven London Comic Marts in 1977, in such locations as the Regent Centre Hotel, Old Town Hall, and the Royal Horticultural Society's Old Hall in Vincent Square. Barrow, meanwhile, staged two of his name-branded marts, both at Lyndhurst Hall.

In 1978, Landau left the mart business when he found a job in the editorial offices of IPC Magazines. He "bequeathed" the Comic Mart name to retailer Mike Conroy, who put on three editions of his "New Original Comic Mart" in 1978, all held at the Royal Horticultural Society's Old Hall. For his part, Barrow put on two London "Comicbook Marketplace" events in 1978, both at Lyndhurst Hall.

1979 belonged to Barrow, as Fantasy Domain put on seven Comicbook Marketplace events that year, all at his favorite venue, Lyndhurst Hall. In late November 1979, however, Landau returned full-time back into the world of commerce; having left IPC Magazines, he and his company Titan Distributors took back Comic Mart from Conroy, staging one show at Central Hall Westminster.

Landau/Titan Distributors and Barrow/Fantasy Domain basically alternated months in 1980, with Titan Distributors staging five Comic Marts — including the special April "convention" — at their favored location, Central Hall Westminster; while Fantasy Domain staged seven Comicbook Marketplace events at Lyndhurst Hall.

In 1981, bi-monthly Comic Marts were being held in Central Hall Westminster, with Barrow's Comicbook Marketplace taking the alternating months. Paul Gravett began his career managing the Fast Fiction table at the bimonthly Comic Marts. Gravett invited artists to send him their homemade comics, which he would sell from the Fast Fiction table with all proceeds going to the creator. The Comic Mart Fast Fiction table lasted at least through the 1987 show.

The Comic Mart of 16 October 1982, featured a "Teach-In and Work-In" sponsored by the Society of Strip Illustration, with a number of creators from 2000 AD talking and presenting about their work.

The 1983 London Comic Mart, held October 15 again at Central Hall Westminster, was the host convention for the Eagle Awards, which were presented by Alan Moore and Dave Gibbons. (The British Comic Art Convention disappeared after the 1981 show, and the United Kingdom Comic Art Convention didn't start up until 1985, so there were no actual comic book conventions being held in London during this time.)

Comic Marts held in 1984 included the 2 June event; guests included John Ridgway, Gary Russell, and Richard Marson. The 8 December 1984, Comic Mart was billed as an "Escape Event," and featured the creators of Escape magazine, including Eddie Campbell, Glenn Dakin, Phil Elliott, Hunt Emerson, Rian Hughes, Ed Pinsent, and Savage Pencil.

Both Titan Distributors and Fantasy Domain were still going strong in 1989, when they continued to host competing marts on alternating months. At some point before 1989, Barrow moved his Comicbook Marketplaces from Lyndhurst Hall to Camden Centre. They later moved to the Royal National Hotel.

=== Regional comic marts ===
In 1976, Barrow expanded his operation regionally, hosting a September 12 comic mart in Birmingham at the Imperial Centre Hotel. In 1977, he produced four marts in Birmingham and one in Kingston upon Hull (held at the Hull Centre Hotel on 26 February). He returned to Birmingham in 1978, putting on two Comic Marts at the Birmingham Centre Hotel, held on 11 February and 20 May.

Meanwhile, in 1977 in Liverpool, Zephyr Magazines produced two Liverpool Comic Marts, one held on 1 August and one 8 October both at the Bluecoat Chambers concert hall. (The organizers claimed that this was their 10th year producing comic marts in Liverpool.) Zephyr produced three more Liverpool Comic Marts in 1978, on 19 August, 21 October, and 16 December, again all held at Bluecoat Chambers.

In 1979, Peter Lennon took over management of the Birmingham Comic Mart, which was held on 10 March of that year.

The Comic Mart phenomenon spread to Manchester in 1980, with Bob Smart and Graham Holt producing five events that year, all held at Piccadilly Plaza Exhibition Hall. These shows had no connection with previous Manchester comic marts. By the end of 1980, Smart was going it alone, adding Liverpool to the Comic Mart mix. In 1981, Smart produced six Comic Marts in Liverpool and five in Manchester.

The city of Leeds joined the Comic Mart trend in 1981, with four marts being staged at the Griffin Hotel on Boar Lane, and three more held there in 1982.

A Birmingham "Comic, Film & Fantasy Mart" was held at the New Imperial Hotel on 16 August 1986.

Two Leeds Comic Marts were held in 1988, on 30 July and 26 November, both at the Griffin Hotel.

Six Birmingham "Comic Mart & Film Fair" events were held in 1989 at the New Imperial Hotel: on 18 February, 1 April, 3 June, 29 July, 23 September and 25 November. They were produced by Golden Orbit of York. That same year, Golden Orbit put on four Sheffield Comic Mart & Film Fair events: on 25 February, 27 May, 22 July, and 18 November, all held at Sheffield Polytechnic.

=== Later marts, controversy ===
By the mid-1990s, the London Comic Marts became overshadowed by the annual United Kingdom Comic Art Convention, as well as the penetration of the Internet, which made it easier to buy old comics at more reasonable prices. Titan Distributors was sold in 1992, at which point the original "Comic Mart" faded away. Barrow continued to hold Comicbook Marketplaces sporadically, even up into 2011, but without the same fanfare.

In 2012, Barrow was given a one-year prison sentence (suspended) for possession of child pornography.

== Locations and dates ==
=== London Comic Mart ===
Event originated by Nick Landau and Rob Barrow, eventually becoming solely run by Landau/Titan Distributors. By the early 1980s, the events (which were generally held on a Saturday) became known as the Westminster Comic Marts.

Year	Date(s)	Show title	Organizer(s)	Venue	Notes	Source
1970	"A Saturday"	Mini-con	Frank Dobson	The Eagle pub	A small group of comics dealers rented out the upstairs room	
1972	2 December	Comic Mart	Rob Barrow & Nick Landau	Lyndhurst Hall, Kentish Town	Over 250 attendees	
1973	24 February	Comic Mart	Barrow & Landau	Lyndhurst Hall		
1973	17 November	Comic Mart	Barrow & Landau			
1974	Jan.	Comic Mart	Barrow & Landau			
1974	27 April	Comic Mart	Barrow & Landau	Holborn Assembly Hall	Evening fantasy film marathon	
1974	20–21 July	Comicon/Comic Mart Summer Special 1974	Barrow	Regent Centre Hotel	Combined convention; Denis Gifford the only "industry guest"	
1974	September	Comic Mart	Barrow & Landau	Holborn Assembly Hall		
1974	5 October	Comic Mart	Barrow & Landau	Holborn Assembly Hall		
1974	14 December	Comic Mart	Barrow & Landau	Holborn Assembly Hall		
1975	June	Comic Mart	Landau			
1975	August	Comic Mart	Landau	Central Hall Westminster	Two-day event	
1975	8 November	Comic Mart	Landau	Lyndhurst Hall, Kentish Town		
1976	3 October	Comic Mart	Landau	Regent Centre Hotel		
1976	28 November	Comic Mart	Landau	Regent Centre Hotel		
1977	16 January	Comic Mart	Landau	Regent Centre Hotel		
1977	26 March	Comic Mart	Landau	Old Town Hall, Kensington		
1977	14 May	Comic Mart	Landau	Old Town Hall, Kensington		
1977	8 June	Comic Mart	Landau	Royal Horticultural Society's Old Hall		
1977	31 July	Comic Mart	Landau	Royal Horticultural Society's Old Hall		
1977	2 October	Comic Mart	Landau	Royal Horticultural Society's Old Hall		
1977	2 November	Comic Mart	Landau	Royal Horticultural Society's Old Hall		
1978	22 January	New Original Comic Mart	Mike Conroy	Royal Horticultural Society's Old Hall		
1978	10 June	New Original Comic Mart	Mike Conroy	Royal Horticultural Society's Old Hall		
1978	10 September	New Original Comic Mart	Mike Conroy	Royal Horticultural Society's Old Hall		
1978	5 November	New Original Comic Mart	Mike Conroy	Royal Horticultural Society's Old Hall		
1979	3 November	Comic Mart	Landau/Titan Distributors	Central Hall Westminster		
1980	19 January	Comic Mart	Titan Distributors	Central Hall Westminster		
1980	19 April	Comic Mart	Titan Distributors	Central Hall Westminster	"Convention"	
1980	12 July	Comic Mart	Titan Distributors	Central Hall Westminster		
1980	18 October	Comic Mart	Titan Distributors	Central Hall Westminster		
1980	13 December	Comic Mart	Titan Distributors	Central Hall Westminster		
1981	7 February	Comic Mart	Titan Distributors	Central Hall Westminster		
1981	April	Comic Mart	Titan Distributors	Central Hall Westminster	"Convention"	
1981	6 June	Comic Mart	Titan Distributors	Central Hall Westminster		
1981	6 August	Comic Mart	Titan Distributors	Central Hall Westminster		
1981	17 October	Comic Mart	Titan Distributors	Central Hall Westminster		
1981	12 December	Comic Mart	Titan Distributors	Central Hall Westminster		
1982	February 6	Comic Mart	Titan Distributors	Central Hall Westminster		
1982	16 October	Comic Mart	Titan Distributors	Central Hall Westminster	"Teach-In and Work-In" hosted by Society of Strip Illustration	
1982	11 December	Comic Mart	Titan Distributors	Central Hall Westminster		
1983	5 February	Comic Mart	Titan Distributors	Central Hall Westminster		
1983	15 October	Comic Mart	Titan Distributors	Central Hall Westminster	Host convention for the Eagle Awards, presented by Alan Moore and Dave Gibbons	
1983	10 December	Comic Mart	Titan Distributors	Central Hall Westminster		
1984	4 February	Comic Mart	Titan Distributors	Central Hall Westminster		
1984	4 April	Comic Mart	Titan Distributors	Central Hall Westminster	Guests: "Marvel Bullpen"	
1984	2 June	Comic Mart	Titan Distributors	Central Hall Westminster	Guests include John Ridgway, Gary Russell, and Richard Marson	
1984	8 December	Comic Mart	Titan Distributors	Central Hall Westminster	"Escape Event," featuring Eddie Campbell, Glenn Dakin, Phil Elliott, Hunt Emerson, Rian Hughes, Ed Pinsent, and Savage Pencil	
1988	6 August	Comic Mart	Titan Distributors	Central Hall Westminster		
1988	October	Comic Mart	Titan Distributors	Central Hall Westminster	John Higgins, John Ridgway, Lee Sullivan, and Doug Braithwaite	
1989	4 February	Comic Mart	Titan Distributors	Central Hall Westminster		
1989	8 April	Comic Mart	Titan Distributors	Central Hall Westminster		
1989	10 June	Comic Mart	Titan Distributors	Central Hall Westminster		

=== Comicbook Marketplace (London) ===
These events, produced by Rob Barrow's corporate entity, Fantasy Domain, were for many years held at Lyndhurst Hall, Kentish Town; at some point they moved to Camden Centre on Bidborough Street in Camden Town. In 1976–1977 the events were titled "Rob Barrow's Comic Book Marketplace;" from that point forward they were titled simply "Comicbook Marketplace." As opposed to the Westminster Comic Marts, these events were usually held on a Sunday.

Year	Date(s)	Venue	Notes	Source
1976	13 November	Lyndhurst Hall, Kentish Town	Titled "Rob Barrow's Comic Book Marketplace"	
1977	15 October	Lyndhurst Hall	Titled "Rob Barrow's Comic Book Marketplace"	
1977	10 December	Lyndhurst Hall	Titled "Rob Barrow's Comic Book Marketplace"	
1978	4 March	Lyndhurst Hall		
1978	10 June	Lyndhurst Hall		
1978	14 October	Lyndhurst Hall	Film showing of Black Belt Jones	
1978	16 December	Lyndhurst Hall	Film showing of Blazing Saddles	
1979	17 February	Lyndhurst Hall	Free film shows; free admission	
1979	24 March	Lyndhurst Hall	Free film shows; free admission	
1979	5 May	Lyndhurst Hall	Free film shows; free admission	
1979	9 June	Lyndhurst Hall	Free film shows; free admission	
1979	4 August	Lyndhurst Hall	Free film shows; free admission	
1979	6 October	Lyndhurst Hall	Free film shows; free admission	
1979	8 December	Lyndhurst Hall	Free film shows; free admission	
1980	9 February	Lyndhurst Hall	Free admission	
1980	8 March	Lyndhurst Hall	Free admission	
1980	10 May	Lyndhurst Hall	Free admission	
1980	7 June	Lyndhurst Hall	Free admission	
1980	9 August	Lyndhurst Hall	Free admission	
1980	13 September	Lyndhurst Hall	Free admission	
1980	8 November	Lyndhurst Hall	Free admission	
1981	3 January	Lyndhurst Hall		
1981	28 February	Lyndhurst Hall		
1981	2 May	Lyndhurst Hall		
1981	25 July	Lyndhurst Hall		
1982	9 January	Lyndhurst Hall		
1982	6 March	Lyndhurst Hall		
1982	8 May	Lyndhurst Hall		
1982	4 September	Lyndhurst Hall		
1982	13 November	Lyndhurst Hall		
1988	17 July	Camden Centre		
1989	5 March	Camden Centre	Free admission	
1989	7 May	Camden Centre	Free admission	
1989	16 July	Camden Centre	Free admission	
1989	3 September	Camden Centre	Free admission	
1989	5 November	Camden Centre	Free admission	
2001	25 November	T.U.C. (Trade Union Centre) Congress Centre		
2015	6 September	Royal National Hotel		
2015	4 October	Royal National Hotel		

=== Northwest Comic Marts ===
Retailer/wholesaler Bob Smart's events in Manchester and Liverpool.

Year	Date(s)	Show title	Organizer(s)	Venue	Notes	Source
1980	5 January	Manchester Comic Mart	Bob Smart and Graham Holt	Piccadilly Plaza Exhibition Hall		
1980	22 March	Manchester Comic Mart	Bob Smart and Graham Holt	Piccadilly Plaza Exhibition Hall		
1980	31 May	Manchester Comic Mart	Bob Smart and Graham Holt	Piccadilly Plaza Exhibition Hall		
1980	2 August	Manchester Comic Mart	Bob Smart and Graham Holt	Piccadilly Plaza Exhibition Hall		
1980	27 September	Manchester Comic Mart	Bob Smart and Graham Holt	Piccadilly Plaza Exhibition Hall		
1980	29 November	Manchester Comic Mart	Bob Smart and Graham Holt	Piccadilly Plaza Exhibition Hall	20 pence admission charge (includes free raffle ticket)	
1980	6 December	Liverpool Comic Mart	Bob Smart	Bluecoat Concert Hall	20 pence admission charge (includes free raffle ticket)	
1981	31 January	Liverpool Comic Mart	Bob Smart	Bluecoat Concert Hall	20 pence admission charge (includes free raffle ticket)	
1981	28 February	Manchester Comic Mart	Bob Smart	Piccadilly Plaza Exhibition Hall	20 pence admission charge (includes free raffle ticket)	
1981	14 March	Liverpool Comic Mart	Bob Smart	Bluecoat Concert Hall	20 pence admission charge (includes free raffle ticket)	
1981	18 April	Manchester Comic Mart	Bob Smart	Piccadilly Plaza Exhibition Hall	20 pence admission charge (includes free raffle ticket)	
1981	30 May	Liverpool Comic Mart	Bob Smart	Bluecoat Concert Hall	20 pence admission charge (includes free raffle ticket)	
1981	27 June	Manchester Comic Mart	Bob Smart	Piccadilly Plaza Exhibition Hall	20 pence admission charge (includes free raffle ticket)	
1981	25 July	Liverpool Comic Mart	Bob Smart	Bluecoat Concert Hall	20 pence admission charge (includes free raffle ticket)	
1981	22 August	Manchester Comic Mart	Bob Smart	Piccadilly Plaza Exhibition Hall	20 pence admission charge (includes free raffle ticket)	
1981	19 September	Liverpool Comic Mart	Bob Smart	Bluecoat Concert Hall	20 pence admission charge (includes free raffle ticket)	
1981	7 November	Manchester Comic Mart	Bob Smart	Piccadilly Plaza Exhibition Hall	20 pence admission charge (includes free raffle ticket)	
1981	5 December	Liverpool Comic Mart	Bob Smart	Bluecoat Concert Hall	20 pence admission charge (includes free raffle ticket)	
1988	12 November	Manchester Comic Mart		Picadilly Plaza Exhibition Hall		
