= Joe Longthorne =

English singer and impressionist (1955–2019)

Joe Longthorne MBE
- Born: Joseph Patrick Daniel Longthorne; 31 May 1955; Hull, England
- Died: 3 August 2019 (aged 64); Blackpool, England
- Years active: 1969–2019
- Spouse: James Moran
- Children: 1

Joseph Patrick Daniel Longthorne MBE (31 May 1955 – 3 August 2019) was an English singer and impressionist. He performed on stage, television and released three platinum albums. Longthorne started his TV career at the age of fourteen when he landed a part in Yorkshire Television's series Junior Showtime, and rose to popularity in 1981 through the London Weekend Television series Search For a Star, leading to his own television series The Joe Longthorne Show.

== Early life ==
Longthorne was born in Hull, England, into a musical family of a "travelling, Romany background". He grew up in the Hessle Road area of Hull, known for its fishing community, and considered himself as a "Hessle Roader". He attended Villa Place Primary School, St Wilfred's Primary School and Sydney Smith High School.

Longthorne won a talent show when he was six; his prize was a toy motor car. At fourteen, he landed a part in Yorkshire Television's series Junior Showtime, and remained with the show for over two years. He later turned professional and earned a living in working men's clubs in Northern England.

== Television ==
Longthorne appeared on television in 1981, through the London Weekend Television series Search For a Star, on which he performed as a singer and impressionist. His success on the show led to appearances at the London Palladium and a month-long season at London's Talk of the Town nightclub. He played the London Palladium many times.

In 1988, he presented his own television series, The Joe Longthorne Show.

Longthorne appeared regularly on several TV programmes in the 1980s, including The Les Dennis Laughter Show and The Royal Variety Performance. He performed in theatres in the United States and at the Sydney Opera House. Longthorne also released three platinum albums for Telstar: The Joe Longthorne Songbook, Especially For You and The Joe Longthorne Christmas Album.

== Impressions ==
Longthorne was known for his renditions of songs in the style of Dame Shirley Bassey. His other impersonations included Frank Sinatra, Sammy Davis Jr., Johnny Mathis and Tom Jones.

== Awards ==
The Variety Club awarded him its Lifetime Achievement Award in 2007; this placed him amongst past recipients such as Frank Sinatra, Judy Garland, and Ella Fitzgerald.

Longthorne was appointed a Member of the Order of the British Empire (MBE) in the 2012 Birthday Honours for services to charity.

== Personal life and death ==
Longthorne lived in Blackpool, Lancashire, with his husband and manager James Moran. Longthorne was bisexual, and had a son, Ricky, from a previous relationship; the two were estranged for 17 years, until reuniting in 2009.

Longthorne was diagnosed with chronic lymphatic lymphoma, for which he received treatment, around the time of his appearance at the Royal Variety Performance in 1989. He continued to perform in spite of his illness. In 2005, the lymphoma degenerated into leukaemia, and he underwent a bone marrow transplant. In 2014, Longthorne was found to have throat cancer, but remained adamant in newspaper interviews that he would continue to perform after his operation.

Longthorne died at home in Blackpool on 3 August 2019, aged 64. He is interred at Layton Cemetery in Blackpool.

== Legacy ==
In 2020, the theatre on Blackpool's North Pier was renamed The Joe Longthorne Theatre. In 2023, a clip of Longthorne performing "Morning of My Life" was watched on a Twitch stream by Scottish comedian Limmy, who introduced a new generation of listeners to Longthorne in doing so. Longthorne's newfound posthumous cult following led to the creation of the Instagram account @morningofmylifedaily, which reposts clips of Longthorne hitting the high note in "Morning of My Life" in live performances every day. The account has accumulated over 32,000 followers.

== Albums ==
- Only Once
- The Singer
- I Wish You Love (1993) UK #47
- Live at the Royal Albert Hall (1994) UK #57
- The Joe Longthorne Songbook (1988) UK #16 (12 weeks on the chart)
- The Christmas Album (1989) UK #44
- Especially For You (1989) UK #22 (10 weeks)
- The Joe Longthorne Christmas (2003)
- Sings to the Gods (2008)
- Golden Memories
- A Man and His Music (2013)
- Joe Longthorne: the Christmas Album (2013)
- Love & Reflection (2002)
- Seasonal Songs from the Heart (2005)
- Perfect Love (2005)
- What a Wonderful World (2006)
- You and Me (2008)
- Live: A Man & His Music
- Joe Longthorne – The Collection (2015)
- The Silver Years (2020)
- Longthorne also reached the UK Top 75 Singles Chart twice in 1994, #61 with "Young Girl" and his biggest hit "Passing Strangers" a duet with Liz Dawn which peaked at #34

== Bibliography ==
- Joe Longthorne – Sugar in the Morning: The Autobiography (2015)ISBN 1784187186
