= British Comic Art Convention =

British comic book convention

- 1968 attendee badge. Art by Mike Higgs.
- Status: Defunct
- Genre: Comic books
- Venue: Waverley Hotel, London (1969, 1971–1973); Regent Centre Hotel, London (1974–1977, 1981)
- Locations: Birmingham (1968, 1978, 1979); London (1969, 1971–1978, 1981); Sheffield (1970)
- Country: United Kingdom
- Inaugurated: 1968
- Most recent: 1981
- Organizer: Rob Barrow (1973–1978)

The British Comic Art Convention (usually known by the moniker Comicon) was an annual British comic book convention which was held between 1968 and 1981, usually in London. The earliest British fan convention devoted entirely to comics, it was also the birthplace of the Eagle Awards.

Most editions of Comicon took place over two days, usually on a Saturday and Sunday. The convention featured floorspace for exhibitors, including comic book dealers and collectibles merchants. Along with panels, seminars, and workshops with comic book professionals, one of the highlights of Comicon was the Saturday all-night film show. Charity auctions of original comic book art were also usually held. Convention booklets produced in conjunction with each show featured original illustrations by comics professional and fanzine artists.

Early editions of the convention were intimate affairs where comics enthusiasts gathered to socialize, network, and educate each other about the form. As the convention evolved and grew, it increasingly focused on comics dealers and professional guests.

== History ==
The first Comicon was organized by 18-year-old fanzine publisher Phil Clarke and was held 30 August – 2 September 1968 in Birmingham, England. (Clarke paid £111 of his own money to rent the venue for the show, the Midland Hotel.) The first show attracted both professional and amateur creators of the time, including, Paul Neary, Jim Baikie, Steve Moore, and Nick Landau. It also featured a "fancy dress" contest, in which contestants dressed up as characters from the comic books.

Comicon '69, held in London, was organized by retailer Bram Stokes, "Godfather of British fandom" Frank Dobson, and Steve Moore.

Comicon '70 was organized by Sam Plumb and held in Sheffield.

Comicon '71 returned to London (where it mostly stayed from that point forward), and was organized by Bram Stokes and Dez Skinn. The guest of honor was Frank Bellamy. An underground comix panel featured cartoonist Edward Barker, and editors Mick Farren and Graham Keen.

Comicon '72, the fifth annual show, was organized by Nick Landau/Comic Media. Attendees included comedian Bob Monkhouse and Monty Python member Terry Gilliam; Brian Bolland made his first professional contacts. The all-night film show was sponsored by the Electric Cinema Club and Richard Williams Films.

Comicon '73, planned and promoted by Bram Stokes and John Mansefield, was scheduled for the weekend of 21–22 July at London's Regent Centre Hotel, with special guests Frank Bellamy, Morris, James Warren, Peter O'Donnell, Bruce Pennington, Jim Cawthorne, Yaroslav Horak, Eddie Jones, Philippe Druillet, Jean Giraud, and Albert Weinberg (Dan Cooper). A cadre of famous American Marvel Comics comics creators — including Stan Lee, Jim Steranko, and Neal Adams — were also tentatively scheduled to appear. Films planned to be screened include a Star Trek blooper reel, Richard Corben's Neverwhere, an episode of The Avengers television show, and the U.F.O. television film. The event being abruptly canceled shortly before it was scheduled, however, the show was salvaged by Nick Landau and Rob Barrow, who by that time were promoters of the competing London Comic Mart shows. Landau and Barrow managed to put on a one-day Comicon on 22 July at the usual location of the Waverley Hotel. Barrow (and his corporate entity Fantasy Domain) organized the convention for at least the next four years.

Barrow's first solo convention, Comicon '74, was co-billed as "Comicon/Comic Mart Summer Special 1974." Returning to being a two-day affair, it was held at the Regent Centre Hotel. The only industry guest was Denis Gifford, who delivered a presentation. There was an all-night film show on Saturday, and films were shown Sunday evening as well.

The tenth anniversary show, Comicon '77, hosted the first presentation of the Eagle Awards, organized by Mike Conroy, Nick Landau, Fantasy Advertiser's Colin Campbell, Phil Clarke, and Richard Burton. The Comicon '77 program booklet featured interviews with special guests Brian Bolland and Dave Gibbons. A talk on the characters of Edgar Rice Burroughs was given by Frank Westwood of the British E.R.B. society, and Dez Skinn gave a slide show on the artist and the comic book. An underground comix panel featured Hunt Emerson and Chris Welch.

1978 was a complicated year, as organizer Barrow scheduled two editions of the show: the main one in London, and a subsequent edition — "Comicon II" — in Birmingham. The convention booklet was produced by OVR Comics. Comicon II, the Birmingham edition, held September 2–3, 1978, at the Imperial Hotel, was a disaster. First of all, one of the guests of honor, Dave Cockrum, did not show up. Secondly, a local smallpox scare kept dealers and crowds away. Thirdly, there were mix-ups by the hotel. Nonetheless, Barrow went forward with the show, including film showings and panels. An underground comix slideshow was presented by Chris Welch and Hunt Emerson.

In 1979, long-time organizer Barrow turned his focus away from Comicon and toward his comic mart business in London and elsewhere. Ultimately, two Comicon '79s ended up taking place — one in London and one in the originating location of Birmingham. Comicon (London) 1979, the official "British Comic Art Convention 11," was sponsored by Valhalla Books of Ilford, Essex, and organized by Ian Starling, Neville Ferris, and Ian Knox (who promised future conventions, none of which seem to have occurred). It took place August 11-12, 1979, held at the Rembrandt Hotel, Thurloe Place. The guest of honor was Jim Starlin. The Birmingham edition of Comicon '79, officially known as the "U.K. Comic Art & Fantasy Convention," was organized by Rob Barrow's former convention partner Colin Campbell, previously the editor/publisher of Fantasy Advertiser (and later to become a co-owner of Forbidden Planet International). Campbell's convention was held August 31–September 2 at the Birmingham Metropole, National Exhibition Centre. The guest of honor was Jim Steranko, and other guests included Marshall Rogers, Chris Claremont, Terry Austin, Paul Levitz, Howard Chaykin, Len Wein, and Joe Staton.

The British Comic Art Convention did not take place in 1980. To fill the void, Starburst magazine (at that point owned by Marvel Comics) produced the Marvel Comics Film & Fantasy Convention, held at Lawrence Hall, London. True to its name, however, the show and its guests had very little connection to the comic book industry.

In the early months of 1981, flyers appeared at the Comicbook Marketplace promising a Comicon '81, but there were concerns that proper permissions to use the name had not been acquired. In the end, the final incarnation of Comicon was held in late October 1981 at the old location of London's Regent Centre Hotel, organized by Dez Skinn and Frank Dobson. Skinn and Dobson organized the show as a more intimate convention, "with the fan in mind;" an art exhibit featured comics from Alex Raymond to the present. In addition, the Saturday "ComiCon Banquet" featured the fifth annual presentation of the Eagle Awards, as well as the presentation of the Society of Strip Illustration Awards, and the Ally Sloper Award.

== Legacy ==
The following year saw Comicana 82, held on 25 and 26 September at London's Regent Crest Hotel. Produced by Rob Barrow's Fantasy Domain and Comic Showcase, the special guest was Frank Miller. The next British comics convention to be staged with any regularity was the United Kingdom Comic Art Convention (UKCAC), which was held annually from 1985 to 1998.

== Locations and dates ==
Dates	Location	Organizer	Official guests	Program booklet contributors	Films screened	Notes	Source
30 August – 2 September 1968	Midland Hotel, Birmingham	Phil Clarke	Paul Neary, Jim Baikie, Steve Moore, and Nick Landau, and Frank Dobson ("Godfather of British Comics")				
Summer 1969	Waverley Hotel, London	Bram Stokes, Frank Dobson, and Steve Moore	Steve Parkhouse and Barry Smith	Jim Baikie (cover), Denis Gifford, Vaughn Bodē, Wally Wood, Joe Orlando, Al Williamson, Jeff Jones, Bernie Wrightson, Steve Moore (lettering)	The Black Knight, an episode of the 1954 Flash Gordon TV show, and Heading West (a Durango Kid film)		
1970	Rutland Hotel, Sheffield	Sam Plumb (assisted by Jon Harvey, Dave Fletcher, and Peter D. Parkin)		Mike Higgs, Trevor Goring, Ken Simpson (cover), Fletcher			
27–28 February 1971	Waverley Hotel, London	Dark They Were and Golden Eyed (Bram Stokes) and Dez Skinn	Frank Bellamy (guest of honor); Denis Gifford, Frank Dickens, Mick Farren, and Edward Barker	Dave Gibbons, Paul Neary, Jim Baikie, Mike Higgs	Hush...Hush, Sweet Charlotte		
5–6 August 1972	Waverley Hotel	Nick Landau/Comic Media		Dave Gibbons (cover), Kevin O'Neill, Mike Higgs	Eyes Without a Face, The Gorgon, Les Enfants Terribles, The General, The Adventurer, The Philosopher's Stone, The Immigrant, Scarface, The Blood of a Poet, The Little Island, A Christmas Carol, The Spirit of 1976 (a Betty Grable film), The Devil and the Nun, The Gadfly, Judex, La Jetée, and Sherlock Jr.	5th annual show	
22 July 1973	Waverley Hotel	Nick Landau and Rob Barrow (replacing Bram Stokes and John Mansefield)			None.		
20–21 July 1974	Regent Centre Hotel, London	Rob Barrow	Denis Gifford			Co-billed as "Comic Mart Summer Special 1974;" admission: 35p for one day; 60p for both days	
2–3 August 1975	Regent Centre Hotel	Rob Barrow	John Romita Sr., Frank Hampson, Paul Neary			Admission: 50p for both days	
21–22 August 1976	Regent Centre Hotel	Rob Barrow	Paul Neary, Tony Weare, Dave Gibbons, John Bolton, Kevin O'Neill, Brian Bolland, Ron Embleton, John M. Burns, Brian Lewis, Martin Asbury, Frank Hampson, John Romita, Sr., Bryan Talbot, Hunt Emerson	44 pages; Trevor Goring (cover), Barry Windsor-Smith, John Romita, Sr., Paul Neary, Brian Lewis, John Bolton, Dave Gibbons, Denis Gifford, Kevin O'Neill, Brian Bolland, Ron Embleton, John M. Burns, Martin Asbury, Frank Hampson, Mike Higgs, Bryan Talbot, Hunt Emerson, Ken Simpson, Steve Mitchell, Paul Milliner		Admission: 70p for both days	
3–4 September 1977	Bloomsbury Centre Hotel	Rob Barrow	Brian Bolland, Dave Gibbons, Trevor Goring	John Bolton, Hunt Emerson, Leslie Stannage, Frank Frazetta, John Byrne	Doc Savage: The Man of Bronze, The Ultimate Warrior, Night of the Living Dead, Danger: Diabolik, Slaughterhouse-Five, Jason and the Argonauts, The Black Bird, The Man Who Fell to Earth, and The Adventures of Barry McKenzie. Cartoons: Superman, Felix the Cat, and Yellow Submarine shorts	10th anniversary show; first annual presentation of the Eagle Awards	
29–30 July 1978	Bloomsbury Centre Hotel	Rob Barrow and Colin Campbell	Don McGregor (guest of honor); George Pérez, Jim Salicrup, Duffy Vohland, Brian Bolland, John Bolton, Brian Lewis, Trevor Goring, Dez Skinn, Dave Gibbons	68 pages: Frank Bellamy (cover; originally done for the Comicon '72 booklet but not used); an appreciation of Don McGregor by Richard Burton; a Michael Kaluta interview by Chuck Dixon; and artwork by Jack Kirby, Frank Thornton, Fred Holmes, Dave Gibbons, Brian Bolland, Brian Lewis, Judith Hunt, Mike McMahon, Frank Humphries, Joe Staton, Trevor Goring, Keith Watson, Ron Embleton, Dicky Howett, Frank Hampson, John Bolton, Walt Simonson, and Hunt Emerson	Saturday "All Nite Film Show": Sinbad and the Eye of the Tiger, Jabberwocky, Freebie and the Bean, Freaks, The Vault of Horror, Monkey Business, and Dr. Cyclops. Sunday: James Bond movies Live and Let Die and Rollerball.	11th anniversary show; second annual presentation of the Eagle Awards	
2–3 September 1978	Imperial Hotel, Birmingham	Rob Barrow	Dave Cockrum (guest of honor; did not show), Paul Neary		Fritz the Cat and The Rocky Horror Picture Show	Dubbed "Comicon II"	
11–12 August 1979	Rembrandt Hotel, Thurloe Place, London	Ian Starling, Neville Ferris, and Ian Knox	Jim Starlin (guest of honor); Paul Neary, Dez Skinn	48 pp.: Jim Starlin interview, artwork by Starlin, Brian Bolland, John Bolton, caricaturist Patrick Gaughan, and some uncredited amateur artists		Comicon (London) 1979, or "British Comic Art Convention 11"	
August 31–September 2 1979	Birmingham Metropole, National Exhibition Centre, Birmingham	Colin Campbell/Biytoo Books	Jim Steranko (guest of honor); Marshall Rogers, Chris Claremont, Terry Austin, Paul Levitz, Howard Chaykin, Len Wein, Joe Staton			Comicon '79, or "U.K. Comic Art & Fantasy Convention;" third annual presentation of Eagle Awards	
1980	No Comicon held; "replaced" by Marvel Comics Film & Fantasy Convention						
October 31–November 1 1981	Regent Centre Hotel, London	Dez Skinn and Frank Dobson	Frank Miller, Alan Davis, Paul Neary, Bryan Talbot, Richard Burton, Bernie Jaye, Martin Asbury, Brian Bolland, John Bolton, John M. Burns, Ron Embleton, Dave Gibbons, Don Lawrence, and Mick Anglo	Frank Bellamy (cover, originally done for the Comicon '71 booklet but not used)		Fifth annual presentation of the Eagle Awards	
