= Lyndhurst Hall =

Lyndhurst Hall may refer to:

- Lyndhurst Hall, Kentish Town, a demolished mission hall in London, England, in the United Kingdom
- Lyndhurst Hall, Pascoe Vale South, a heritage-listed house in Melbourne, Victoria, Australia
