= Society of Strip Illustration =

British comics networking group

- Abbreviation: SSI
- Formation: 1977; 49 years ago
- Founders: Denis Gifford
- Dissolved: 2008
- Type: Comics creators organization
- Legal status: Defunct
- Location: London
- Region served: United Kingdom
- Members: UK comic book creators
- Chairman: David Lloyd (c. 1982–1983); Mark Buckingham (c. 1988); Nicholas Vince (1992–1993)

The Society of Strip Illustration (SSI), later known as the Comics Creators Guild, was a British network for all those involved in any stage of the creative process of comics production. The SSI, which was co-founded in 1977 by Denis Gifford, met monthly in London, published a newsletter, and distributed annual awards for achievement in the field. Despite the organization's name, most members were comic book creators, as opposed to those of comic strips like those found in The Beano and The Dandy.

SSI members included Brian Bolland, Dave Gibbons, John Bolton, Kevin O'Neill, Paul Neary, Jim Baikie, Arthur Ranson, Tony Weare, Keith Watson, Alan Davis, Mark Farmer, Alan Grant, Bryan Talbot, David Lloyd, Alan Moore, Neil Gaiman, Dave McKean, Mark Buckingham, Nicholas Vince, and John Maybury. For a while in the 1970s, the SSI met at the London Sketch Club in Dilke Street, Chelsea.

== History ==
In November 1980, the SSI hosted a conference which resulted in the publication of Strips '80, an introduction to the Society and a directory of its members.

According to Brian Bolland, in the early 1980s, scouts from DC Comics came to SSI meetings to recruit British creators to work on DC titles, leading to the so-called British Invasion.

The 1981 Society of Strip Illustration Awards were distributed on Saturday, October 31, at Comicon '81, held at the Regent Centre Hotel, London.

In October 1982, the SSI sponsored a "Teach-In and Work-In" at the Westminster Comic Mart, with a number of creators from 2000 AD and Warrior talking about and presenting their work. David Lloyd was chairman of the SSI, and editor of the newsletter, at this time. A later chairman was Mark Buckingham.

The SSI became the Comics Creators Guild in 1992; Nicholas Vince was secretary and then chairman of the Guild from 1992 to 1993. The Guild's newsletter became known as Comics Forum; it was published quarterly from 1992 to 2004, and then annually until c. 2008.

The Guild appears to have dissolved some time after 2008.

== Awards ==
The SSI distributed awards from 1977 until at least 1989; in 1988 the awards were renamed The Mekon Award (in honor of The Mekon of Mekonta, the arch-enemy of the British comic book hero Dan Dare). When the SSI became the Comics Creators Guild in 1992, the award name was again changed, this time to the Comics Creators Guild Award.

=== 1977 ===
- Best Newcomer — Brian Bolland

=== 1978 ===
- Cartoonist of the Year — Ken Reid
- Humorous Script Writer — Ken Reid

=== 1982 ===
- The Frank Bellamy Award for Lifetime Achievement — Dez Skinn
- Best Writer — Alan Moore
- Humorous Cartoonist of the Year — Hunt Emerson

=== 1983 ===
- Best Writer — Alan Moore
- Best Humour Strip — Danger Mouse, by Arthur Ranson
- Best British Adventure Artist — Jim Baikie

=== 1988 ===
- The Mekon Award for Best British Work — Violent Cases (Titan Books), by Neil Gaiman and Dave McKean

=== 1989 ===
- The Mekon Award for Best British Work — The Adventures of Luther Arkwright (Valkyrie Press), by Bryan Talbot

=== 1992 ===
- The Frank Bellamy Award for Lifetime Achievement — Alberto Breccia
- The CCG Special Award for Achievement — Rusty Staples and Steve Holland
- Best Ongoing Title — The Desert Peach by Donna Barr
- Best Weekly Strip — Zenith by Grant Morrison
- Best Monthly Title — Cerebus by Dave Sim
- Best Humour Comic Strip — Hate by Peter Bagge
- Best Newspaper Strip — Calvin and Hobbes by Bill Watterson
- Best Limited Series — From Hell by Alan Moore and Eddie Campbell
- Best Anthology — Drawn & Quarterly
- Best One-Off Publication — Minotaur by Al Davison
- Best Small Press/Self Publishing Title — Captain Dolphin 1&2 by Ralph Kidson

=== 1994 ===
- The Frank Bellamy Award for Lifetime Achievement — Alex Toth
- The CCG Special Award for Achievement — The Drawing Room
- Best Ongoing Title — Naughty Bits by Roberta Gregory
- Best Cover — Marvels 1 by Alex Ross
- Best Monthly Title — Ranma ½ by Rumiko Takahashi
- Best Humour Comic Strip — Bone by Jeff Smith
- Best Newspaper Strip — Calvin and Hobbes by Bill Watterson
- Best Strip In A Periodical —Life, the Universe and (Almost) Everything by Kate Charlesworth
- Best Limited Series/Story arc — The Tale of One Bad Rat by Bryan Talbot
- Best Anthology — Sputnik
- Best One-Off Publication — The Batman Adventures: Mad Love by Paul Dini and Bruce Timm
- Best Small Press/Self Publishing Title — Tales From Sleaze Castle

=== 1995 ===
- The Frank Bellamy Award for Lifetime Achievement — Carl Barks
- The CCG Special Award for Achievement — Tony and Carol Bennett
- Best Ongoing Title — Nausicaä of the Valley of the Wind by Hayao Miyazaki
- Best Cover — Kane 9
- Best Monthly Title — Batman & Robin Adventures by Paul Dini and Ty Templeton
- Best Humour Comic Strip — The Simpsons Comics
- Best Strip In A Periodical — Leonard and Larry
- Best Limited Series/Story arc — tie between From Hell and Killer Fly
- Best Anthology — Secenes From The Inside
- Best One-Off Publication — Stuck Rubber Baby, by Howard Cruse
- Best Small Press/Self Publishing Title — Bang by Mark Robinson

== See also ==
- Association of Illustrators
- British Cartoonists' Association
- The Cartoonists' Club of Great Britain
