= Mike Higgs =

British comic book artist

Mike Higgs is a British comic book artist, writer, designer, and editor. He is the creator of the oddball humor strip The Cloak, the daily comic strip Moonbird, and the children's character Dopey Dinosaur.

In July 1964, Higgs created a pastiche of The Shadow called "The Shudder" for a British fanzine (of the same name). In 1967, he revived the character, now called "The Cloak," as a strip for the British weekly comic Pow!, and then Smash! (running until 1969). The Cloak was the top agent for Britain's Special Squad, nominally a part of Scotland Yard; but he usually operated from his personal headquarters, known as the Secret Sanctum. The Cloak's ingenuity and never-ending supply of gadgets and secret weapons gave him the edge over his somewhat odd enemies (some were very odd, including Deathshead and various other agents of G.H.O.U.L.). The Cloak had some equally odd colleagues. Assisted initially by Mole (the tall one with the bald head, big nose and specs) and Shortstuff (the short squirt with the hairy nut and big eyeballs), he then began having adventures in which he found himself also alongside the sexy and flirtatious Lady Shady, the shady lady. The strip benefited from Higgs' unusual, idiosyncratic drawing style, whose overt inclusion of pop culture imagery made the strip seem extremely modern.

Higgs designed the convention badge for the inaugural British Comic Art Convention ("Comicon") in 1968. He was a regular attendee of early editions of Comicon, with his art being included in the convention booklets. He also helped with the first London Comic Mart, organized by Nick Landau and Rob Barrow.

After The Cloak was cancelled, Higgs drew the strip Space School for Whizzer and Chips, and Thundercap for Buster, and contributed to British fanzines. His daily strip Moonbird was published for a time in various Associated Newspapers newspapers; the strips were later collected in a series of children's books.

In July 1976, Higgs was a guest at "KAK 76" (Konvention of Alternative Komix), an underground comix convention produced by the Birmingham Arts Lab (Paul Fisher and Hunt Emerson), which was held in Birmingham.

In the early 1980s, budding cartoonist Lew Stringer worked as Higgs' assistant. During the mid-1980s Higgs created Dopey Dinosaur and published a series of 12 rhyming paperbacks aimed at children, in the same format as the Mr Men books by Roger Hargreaves. The series was then published in Australia by Budget Books in 1988.

In the late 1980s, Higgs shifted to becoming a designer and editor. He compiled and designed The Monster Society of Evil: Deluxe Limited Collector's Edition (1989, American Nostalgia Library, ISBN 0-948248-07-6), which reprints the entire "Monster Society of Evil" story arc that ran for two years in Captain Marvel Adventures #22–46 (1943–1945), in which Captain Marvel meets Mister Mind and the Monster Society of Evil. This oversized, slipcased hardcover book was strictly limited to 3,000 numbered copies. That same year, Higgs and co-author Denis Gifford published The Comic Art of Charlie Chaplin: a Graphic Celebration of Chaplin's Centenary (Hawk Books ISBN 0-948248-21-1).

Higgs also collected and designed reprint collections of Eagle's Dan Dare and Comics at War strips.

In 1995, he edited Popeye: 60th Anniversary Edition (1995), with contributions from Denis Gifford and others (Book Sales ISBN 0-7858-0397-1).

== In popular culture ==
Higgs was portrayed, as himself, in Albion #1 (WildStorm, Aug. 2005); the six-issue limited series aimed to revive classic IPC-owned British comics characters — including Higgs' The Cloak — all of whom appeared in comics published by Odhams Press and later IPC Media during the 1960s and early 1970s, such as Smash!, Valiant, and Lion. Albion was plotted by Alan Moore, written by his daughter Leah Moore and her husband John Reppion, with art by Shane Oakley and George Freeman.
