= Cardal Publishing =

British magazine and comic publisher

- Status: defunct
- Founded: c. 1947
- Headquarters location: 83 Ducie Street Manchester, England, UK
- Publication types: Magazines, novels, comics

Cardal Publishing was a British magazine and comic book publisher active during the Golden Age of comics, based in Manchester, England.

The company's publications included erotic fiction and Western novellas, as well as comics.

According to comic historian and critic Steve Holland, cash flow problems caused by obscenity fines forced the firm out of business before the end of the 1940s. The company was liquidated in 1951.

The indicia to Streamline Comics notes that the comic was printed by The Assurance Agents Press, 132-4 Great Ancoats St, which was one street over from Cardal's Ducie Street offices.

== Popular fiction magazines ==
- Western Magazine (c. 1947)
- Girls' Journal (Aug 1947)
- Gay-etty (c.1949) – erotic fiction
- Winter Frolics (1 issue?) (c. 1949) – erotic fiction

== Other magazines ==
- Girl's Review (1947) (1 issue)

== Novels ==
- The Man who Rode by Night, by Dick Sharples – pocket Western
- One Man's War, by Hank Johnson (1949) – pocket Western

The Man Who Rode by Night / One Man's War were published in a single edition in the U.S.

== Comics ==
- Streamline Comics #1–4 (1947)
- New Worlds Comic (1947, reprint)
