= Lyndhurst Hall, Kentish Town =

Coordinates: 51°32′54″N 0°08′56″W

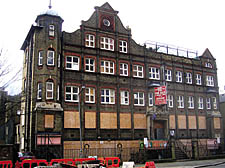
Lyndhurst Hall, Kentish Town a year before its demolition

Lyndhurst Hall was a Victorian mission hall built by Hampstead's Lyndhurst Road Congregational Church. Located in Warden Road, Kentish Town, it was later sold on and used as a community hall, before being demolished in 2006 to make way for flats.

== Construction and early use ==
The hall was built in 1891 under the leadership of Dr Robert Forman Horton, then minister of the Lyndhurst Road, Hampstead church. The foundation stone was laid by local MP Samuel Smith on 29 July 1891 and the building formally opened to the public on 14 March 1892. It was extended in 1911, with a new memorial stone laid on 8 April 1911 by Dr Horton, and the official opening took place on 30 October 1911. Funding for the building and extension was provided by members of the Hampstead Church congregations. The architects for the extension were Spalding and Spalding who were connected with the Lyndhurst Road Church (and were probably responsible for the original building).

Lyndhurst Hall was a resource for the local community a time of general poverty in Kentish Town – Charles Booth poverty maps (1898–99) describe the locality as: "very poor, casual, chronic want". It hosted a range of events, including clubs for boys, girls, men and women, bible classes and Sunday services, as well as entertainment and legal and financial advice. During World War I it was an emergency shelter and operation centre for voluntary aid detachments. Similarly, in World War II it was used as a shelter. It was itself hit by a bomb, which shattered most of the glass in the building.

== Later use ==
During the 1950s, community activities in the hall included the Boys' Brigade, Sunday schools, youth club and children's nursery. The youth club was taken over by the Christian Teamwork Trust from 1958, with activities run by the club's membership and minimal input from the Trust – a controversial management style for the time. Hampstead's Lyndhurst Road Congregational Church sold the building to Metropolitan Borough of St Pancras (later to become part of Camden Council) in 1963, and it reopened as a community centre two years later. It was available for hire for private functions — such as the 1972 and 1973 editions of Comic Mart — and was also home of St Pancras Amateur Boxing Club (SPABC). In the mid 1980s, most of the first floor was taken over and run by Camden Workers Social Club. SPABC moved into alternative premises in 1984 and the youth club closed in 1989. By early 2000, Camden Council had decided to close and sell the premises. The building was finally sold in 2005 and demolished a year later, with anger being expressed by some residents about loss of facilities and a mural inside the building. A block of flats now stands on the site, and the 1911 memorial stone has been incorporated into the foundations and can be seen at street level in Warden Road. Hampstead's Lyndhurst Road Congregational Church, founder and original owner of the Kentish Town mission hall, closed in the 1970s and is now a recording facility for Air Studios.

== External sources ==
- Lyndhurst Road Congregational Church records at The National Archives
