= Looks Familiar =

British television series (1970–1987)

- Genre: Game show Talk show
- Created by: Denis Gifford
- Inspired by: Sounds Familiar
- Written by: Denis Gifford; Denis Norden
- Directed by: David Clark; Anthony Parker; Daphne Shadwell; Robert Reed; Ronald Fouracre; Dennis Kirkland; Neville Green; Alan Tarrant
- Presented by: Denis Norden
- Opening theme: "Dearie" by David Mann and Bob Hilliard (early episodes)
- Country of origin: United Kingdom
- Original language: English
- No. of series: 16
- No. of episodes: 184

Production
- Executive producer: David Clark
- Producers: David Clark; Colin Williams; Alan Tarrant; Robert Reed
- Running time: 30 minutes
- Production company: Thames Television

Original release
- Network: ITV
- Release: 25 August 1970 – 29 July 1983
- Network: Channel 4
- Release: 2 August 1984 – 14 September 1987

Looks Familiar is a British television entertainment programme, which began as a game show, and evolved into a talk show. Running from 25 August 1970 to 14 September 1987, it was hosted by Denis Norden, with 184 episodes being made, usually 30 or 45 minutes in length. Looks Familiar was focused on nostalgia, particularly from the 1930s and 1940s; on each show, the three celebrity guests would be prompted by Norden to reminisce, with the aid of archive clips, often about their careers. Made by Thames Television, it aired on ITV in the afternoons, until latterly being moved to Channel 4 for peak time viewing.

== Background ==
From 1967 to 1974, Sounds Familiar was a radio programme which aired on the BBC Light Programme, and, subsequently, BBC Radio 2. Created by Denis Gifford, it was a panel game based around archive sound clips, hosted by Barry Took. The programme was transferred to television as Looks Familiar, but hosted instead by Denis Norden. The pilot episode was broadcast on ITV on 25 August 1970 at 6.02pm; guests were Humphrey Lyttelton, Jessie Matthews, Cardew Robinson, Alfred Marks and Jimmy Wheeler.

== Format ==
Described as a game to test your NQ ("Nostalgia Quotient"), Norden would be joined by a panel of three celebrities from the world of entertainment who were quizzed by Norden using archive film clips. Earlier episodes featured a mystery guest. The game show element became a less integral part of the programme, with Norden remarking in 1981, "It's more of a chat show, but they are not called upon to make lemons of themselves by not knowing answers. I find out what their area of recall is. You generally find people past the mid-life crisis are fond of old songs and old shows. What people are recalling is their youth."

Looks Familiar was Norden's favourite of his own shows, with him commenting in 2008: "I met so many of the Hollywood stars I knew from my days working in cinemas. I liked the notion of presenting nostalgia without regret: not as an era that was better - simply different".

== Broadcast ==
Following the pilot episode on 25 August 1970, Looks Familiar returned two years later, on 18 October 1972 at 3pm (2.55pm in the Granada region). It continued on ITV, being broadcast in the afternoons until 29 July 1983. The hundredth edition of the show, aired on Wednesday 22 February 1978, was moved to an 8pm slot, drawing 16.3 million viewers, and was the 15th most viewed broadcast of the week. The guests were Patricia Hayes and Morecambe and Wise.

From 2 August 1984 to 14 September 1987, it was broadcast by Channel 4 in a peak time slot (initially 8pm), and extended to 45 minutes. During this period, ITV screened repeats in a graveyard slot.

== Guests ==
Guest panellists on the programme included Bob Monkhouse, Danny La Rue, Diana Dors, Arthur Askey, Dickie Henderson, Eric Morecambe, Ernie Wise, Eric Sykes, Lionel Blair, Alfred Marks, Roy Hudd, Roy Castle, June Whitfield, Kenneth Williams, Les Dawson, Michael Bentine, Thora Hird, Michael Parkinson, Frankie Howerd, Jimmy Tarbuck, Peter Sellers and Petula Clark, among others.
