= Junior Showtime =

British children's TV series (1969–1974)

- Genre: Variety show
- Presented by: Bobby Bennett
- Country of origin: United Kingdom
- Original language: English
- No. of series: 8
- No. of episodes: 190

Production
- Running time: 25 minutes
- Production company: Yorkshire Television

Original release
- Network: ITV
- Release: 7 January 1969 – 3 September 1974

Junior Showtime was a British variety show for children made by Yorkshire Television and shown on ITV between 1969 and 1974. The series' executive producer was Jess Yates.

Presented by Bobby Bennett from the Leeds City Varieties theatre, the show consisted of song and dance routines in the music hall style. Several regular performers later developed successful careers in Britain as adults, including Joe Longthorne, Pauline Quirke, Kathryn Apanowicz, Bonnie Langford, Janet Kay, Mark Curry, Lisa Stansfield, and Malandra Burrows. One of the regulars was Glyn Poole of the Poole Family, winners of Opportunity Knocks. The show also featured the return of the 1930s music hall character Old Mother Riley, played by Roy Rolland.

In a 2001 poll by Channel 4 to find the "100 Greatest Kids' TV shows" Junior Showtime was at number 99. However Jeff Evans, the author of The Penguin TV Companion has also identified it as being amongst the twenty worst shows of all time. Almost none of the 190 episodes broadcast have survived (see Wiping); only three programmes are believed to still exist.
