= Ally Sloper Award =

British comics award

- Awarded for: Veteran British comic creators
- Country: United Kingdom
- First award: 1976
- Final award: ca. 1982?

The Ally Sloper Awards was an annual awards ceremony recognising veteran British comic creators, initiated by comics historian Denis Gifford in 1976. From 1978, they were awarded under the auspices of the Association of Comic Enthusiasts, also founded by Gifford.

The awards were named after Ally Sloper, the nineteenth-century British comic character championed by Gifford as the world's first comic character. Gifford also launched and edited an Ally Sloper 'comic magazine' in 1976 (published by Alan Class Comics). The award itself was a figurine of Ally Sloper, based on brass doorstops that were produced as merchandising in the nineteenth century.

Prize-giving of the first Ally Sloper Awards for comics creators took place at Gifford's Comics 101 comics convention, held March 19–21, 1976, at the Mount Royal Hotel, London, with TV comedian Bob Monkhouse presenting. The 1981 "Hall of Fame" award was presented at Comicon '81.

== Predecessors ==
In the late nineteenth and early twentieth century, joke awards, known as the Sloper Award of Merit, had been issued while Ally Sloper was at the peak of his popularity, to topical figures such as Scott of the Antarctic, and others who made the news for unusual achievement.

== Award winners ==
=== 1976 ===
- Best British Newspaper Strip Cartoon Artist: Steve Dowling – for Garth in The Daily Mirror
- First British Science Fiction Artist: Hugh Stanley White – for Ian on Mu in Mickey Mouse Weekly (1936)
- Best British Strip Cartoon Artist: Frank Hampson – for Dan Dare in Eagle (1950s)
- IPC sponsored award for outstanding work in their own publications: Don Lawrence – for The Trigan Empire in Ranger and Look and Learn
- Gold Award: Terry Wakefield and his father George (Billy) Wakefield – for strips in Tiny Tots, Bubbles, Tip Top, Butterfly and Joker, amongst other titles.

=== 1980 ===
- Lifetime achievement: Hugh McNeill (was to receive the award, but died the day before the announcement was made)

=== 1981 ===
- Lifetime achievement: Ernest Shaw

=== 1982 ===
- Lifetime Achievement: Fred Robinson

== See also ==
- Eagle Award
- Ally Sloper
