= The British Film Catalogue =

- Vol.2 (Non-Fiction, 1888-1994) of the Catalogue's 2000 edition
- Author: Denis Gifford
- Language: English
- Subject: British film history
- Publisher: Routledge
- Publication date: 1973 (1st ed.), 1986 (2nd ed.), 2000 (3rd ed.)
- Publication place: United Kingdom
- Media type: print
- ISBN: 0-7153-8835-5
- OCLC: 41018260
- Dewey Decimal: 016.791430941
- LC Class: 2002282765

The British Film Catalogue is a reference book compiled by Denis Gifford (1927–2000). It listed every film made in Britain, including feature films, shorts, information films, and student films. For each of more than 14,000 consecutively numbered chronological title entries, information listed includes major credits (director, producer, writer, original author), production company, distributor, actors and actresses, role names, running time, censors’ certificate, genre, and a brief plot. It has an alphabetical index cross-referencing each title to its chronological number.

There existed no central register or other complete archive of films made in the UK, and Gifford sought to address this with the Catalogue.

The 2000 edition of the work, written by Gifford but published shortly after his death, was a two-volume reference work, separating fiction (1895–1994) and non-fiction (1888–1994). The 1973 and 1986 editions were published as single volumes.

To compile the first edition of the work, Gifford spent twenty years meticulously searching through back copies of trade newspapers and tracking down directors who had retired years before.

The Catalogue was selected by the British Library's Curator of Moving Image as his choice in a Sight & Sound magazine shortlist of the best film books: "The nearest we have to a British national filmography was created not by any institute or university but by one man."

Along with the work of other early film archivists and chroniclers, Gifford's work in relation to the Film Catalogue was praised by Leslie Halliwell in the 1976 introduction to the first edition of Halliwell's Film Guide: "I salute especially the work of Leonard Maltin, James Robert Parish, Denis Gifford, Douglas Eames and the unsung anonymous heroes who compiled the reviews of the BFI's Monthly Film Bulletin during the fifties and sixties."

The work is a highly respected reference source in film history, recommended by the British Library and Yale University Library.

== Earlier editions ==
- The British Film Catalogue, 1895-1970 (1973), London: David & Charles. ISBN 0-7153-5572-4, LCCN 72007861, OCLC 447306.
- The British Film Catalogue, 1985-1985 (1986), London: David & Charles. ISBN 0-7153-8835-5, LCCN 86006281 //r88, OCLC 13360824.

== See also ==
- Denis Gifford
- Published work on cinema by Denis Gifford
