= Streamline (character) =

- Cover to Streamline Comics #1; Art by Denis Gifford.

Publication information
- Publisher: Cardal Publishing
- First appearance: Streamline Comics #1 (1947)
- Created by: Denis Gifford; Bob Monkhouse

In-story information
- Alter ego: Keenan King
- Abilities: Superhuman speed Regenerative healing factor Force field generation

Streamline is a British Golden Age superhero, which appeared in the short-lived magazine Streamline Comics (1947), which only ran for four issues. The character was co-created by Denis Gifford and Bob Monkhouse, and later appeared as a character in the 2000 AD strip Zenith and the independent title Black Tower Comics Group Adventures.

== Publication history ==
Streamline was co-created by Denis Gifford and Bob Monkhouse, first appearing in Streamline Comics #1 (1947) published by Cardal Publishing. The comic ran for four issues, black and white throughout inside, with Streamline the main feature. The Streamline strip was drawn in #1 by Denis Gifford, and in #2-4 by science-fiction writer Bryan Berry.

In Streamline's debut appearance, The Adventure of the Flaming Fiends, scientist Keenan King is suspicious when he witnesses a fire at the 21st National Bank, returning to his laboratory to experiment on himself with the mysterious Elixir X. Obtaining a suitable costume, he encounters another bank on fire and discovers robbers in asbestos suits but is beaten back by the heat and forced to leave in order to a rescue the bank security guard. By the time of the next bank fire, he has formulated a liquid that dissolves asbestos. Splashing it over the robbers who are then vulnerable to the heat and flames, and hits them out of the bank to the awaiting police.

Streamline Comics #4 promised more adventures of "Britain's Superman" in Streamline Comics #5 but this was never published.

A reimagined Streamline made a guest appearance in the 2000 AD strip Zenith, along with other vintage British superheroes, debuting in 2000 AD Prog 629 (cover date 3 June 1989). The Zenith strip was written by Grant Morrison and drawn by Steve Yeowell. Zenith's Streamline became a traitor serving the evil alien race the Lloigor and was killed in Prog 660 (cover date 6 January 1990) when super-hero DJ Chill makes the temperature drop severely within Streamline's force field.

Since 1986, the original run of Streamline Comics has been reprinted along with several other out-of-print Golden Age superheroes by British independent comics publisher Black Tower Comics Group, collected in Black Tower Gold Collection. In 2005, the online comic Starscape published Streamline to begin its selection of British Golden Age strips, shown in Comic Display reader format. Since the 1980s, Streamline has appeared in Black Tower Comics Group Adventures, also published by Black Tower Comics Group, drawn by creator/publisher Terry Hooper.

== Powers and abilities ==
Having injected himself with the experimental formula Elixir X, scientist Keenan King becomes "the fastest fighter in the world", gaining super speed, and can rapidly regenerate from even serious, life-threatening injuries. As a character in Zenith, Streamline also had a protective force field.

== Costume ==
Streamline's costume in the original 1940s run was yellow with a lightning-bolt 'S' in the middle of the chest, and included a yellow mask, with blue boots, gloves, belt and cape. When he was revived in Zenith, his costume no longer included a cape, and the 'S' was in a circle and had moved to the left breast, while the boots and gloves were flush with the rest of the costume. The Zenith run was printed in black and white.

== Appearances ==
Streamline drawn by Steve Yeowell in 1989, as he appeared in the 2000AD strip Zenith.

- Streamline; Streamline Comics; #1: The Adventure of the Flaming Fiends (1947)
- Streamline; Streamline Comics; #2 (1947)
- Streamline; Streamline Comics; #3 (1947)
- Streamline; Streamline Comics; #4 (1947)
- Zenith Phase 3; Chapter 3: A Separate Reality; 2000AD; Prog 629 (3 June 1989).
- Zenith Phase 3; Chapter 4: Facts and Figures; 2000AD; Prog 630 (10 June 1989).
- Zenith Phase 3; Chapter 6: Letters from the Underworld; 2000AD; Prog 631 (17 June 1989).
- Zenith Phase 3; Chapter 7: Born Again; 2000AD; Prog 632 (23 June 1989).
- Zenith Phase 3; Chapter 8: Marching as to War; 2000AD; Prog 633 (30 June 1989).
- Zenith Phase 3; Chapter 14: Fire and Brimstone; 2000AD; Prog 655 (2 December 1989).
- Zenith Phase 3; Chapter 15: Seeing the Light; 2000AD; Prog 656 (9 December 1989).
- Zenith Phase 3; Chapter 16: Judgment Day; 2000AD; Prog 657 (16 December 1989).
- Zenith Phase 3; Chapter 17: News from Nowhere; 2000AD; Prog 658 (23 December 1989).
- Zenith Phase 3; Chapter 18: Wolf in the Fold; 2000AD; Prog 659 (30 December 1989).
- Zenith Phase 3; Chapter 19: Shaming the Devil; 2000AD; Prog 660 (6 January 1990).
- Black Tower Comics Group Adventures; various issues (1990s).
- Black Tower British Gold Collection 1 (reprints Streamline Comics #1-4)
- Black Tower Gold: The Ultimate British Comics Gold Collection (reprints Streamline Comics #1-4)

== Streamline Publications ==
Gifford and Monkhouse, the co-creators of Streamline, went on to found the publishing company Streamline Publications circa 1949, which reprinted titles from US publishers such as Atlas and Harvey, including other Golden Age superheroes Captain Might and Master Man, as well as titles in other genres such as the Western Flash Streamline Comics and crime title Spectacular Stories magazine.
