= List of defunct comic book conventions =

This is a list of noteworthy defunct comic book conventions (Note: A convention is presumed noteworthy if it has received significant coverage in reliable sources that are independent of the convention and satisfies the inclusion criteria for a stand-alone article. Other conditions may apply.) (as distinct from anime conventions, furry conventions, gaming conventions, horror conventions, multigenre conventions, and science fiction conventions). This a companion to List of comic book conventions.

== Africa ==
=== Ivory Coast ===
- Coco Bulles (2001–2007)

== Europe ==
=== Italy ===
- Komikazen in Ravenna (2005-2016)

=== Portugal ===
- Amadora BD in Amadora, Portugal (1989-2019)

=== Sweden ===
- UppCon, Uppsala, Sweden (2002-2012)

=== United Kingdom ===
- British Comic Art Convention, England (1968–1981)
- CAPTION, England (1992–2017)
- Comic Expo (Bristol International Comic & Small Press Expo), Bristol, England (2004–2014) — successor to Comic Festival
- Comic Festival, Bristol, England (1999–2004) — began as "Comic 99"
- Comic Mart, London (1972–c. 1987)
- Edinburgh Comic Con, Edinburgh, Scotland (2014–2022)
- Hi-Ex, Inverness, Scotland (2008–2012)
- United Kingdom Comic Art Convention (UKCAC), London, England (1985–1998) — final convention took place in Manchester

== Asia ==
=== Bangladesh ===
- Dhaka Pop Culture Expo, Dhaka

=== India ===
- Comics Fest India, New Delhi (2008-2013)

=== Saudi Arabia ===
- Saudi Comic Con, Jeddah, Saudi Arabia (2017)

== North America ==
=== Canada ===
- Central Canada Comic Con, Winnipeg (1994-2019)
- Toronto Comic Con, Toronto (2003–2012) — acquired by Wizard Entertainment in 2009
- Vancouver Halloween Parade & Expo, Vancouver

=== United States ===
- Academy Con, New York City (1965–1967)
- Adventure Con, Knoxville, Tennessee (2002–2012)
- Atlanta Fantasy Fair, Atlanta (1975–1995)
- Boston Comic Con, Boston (2007–2017)
- Comic Art Convention, New York City (1968–1983) — also held in Philadelphia from 1977–1979
- Comix Fair, Houston (1983–c. 1996) — replaced the defunct Houstoncon
- ConGlomeration, Louisville (2001-2019)
- Creation Con, New York City (1971–1988) — variously named "Big Comicon Creation Convention," "Creation Comic Book & Pop Culture Convention," "Creation '78", etc.
- Dallas Fantasy Fair, Dallas (1982–1995)
- Detroit Triple Fan Fair, Detroit (1965–1978)
- FantaCon, Albany, New York (1979–1990; 2013)
- Houstoncon, Houston (1967–1982)
- Intervention, Washington, D.C. area (2010-2016)
- Magnum Opus Con, Georgia and South Carolina (1986–2001)
- Metro Con, Washington. D.C. (1970–1971) — produced by teenager Gary Groth; attendees included Phil Seuling, Bud Plant, and Dave Cockrum
- Multicon, Oklahoma City (1970–1982)
- North Texas Comic Book Show in Dallas (2011-2020), quarterly
- OrlandoCon, Orlando (1974–1994)
- Stumptown Comics Fest, Portland, Oregon (2004–2013)
- UnCommonCon, Dallas (2000–2001)
- Wildcat Comic Con, Williamsport, Pennsylvania (2012–2014)
