= Mike Conroy (writer) =

Writer

Mike Conroy is a British pop culture writer and former comic book retailer. He is best known for co-creating the long-running industry award, the Eagle Awards. He was an editor for the trade journal Comics International from 1997 to 2010, with the title of editor-in-chief from 2006 to 2010.

Conroy has written for Borderline, Panini Group, Eaglemoss, and SFX among others, primarily as a comics historian. He has written three books on comics history.

== Career ==
Conroy managed the Eagle Awards from 1977 to 2014, with some significant hiatuses. He co-created the awards with Richard Burton in 1976, and the Eagles were presented annually at the British Comic Art Convention in the period 1977–1981, and then the United Kingdom Comic Art Convention in the period 1987–1990, as well as select other conventions in the years in-between.

In 1978, Conroy took over management of the London Comic Mart from Nick Landau, putting on four editions of the "New Original Comic Mart" that year, all held at the Royal Horticultural Society's Old Hall. Landau and his company Titan Distributors took back the Mart from Conroy in 1979.

The Eagle Awards took a hiatus for much of the 1990s as Conroy concentrated on his freelance writing. (The Eagles were replaced in the interim by the UK Comic Art Award and then the National Comics Awards.) He became a contributor to Comics International early on its existence, and his "Frame to Frame" column was a long-running featuring discussing the interaction between movies and comics. In 1997, he became news editor of Comics International (replacing Phill Hall in that position).

In 2000, Conroy revived the Eagles; they were presented at Comic Festival in 2000 and 2002, and then at Comic Expo in the years 2004 and 2006–2008.

Meanwhile, Comics International changed hands in 2006, and Conroy was promoted to editor-in-chief. Under Conroy's direction, however, the magazine only published eight regular issues (and a few specials) in three years, before shutting down.

After leaving Comics International, Conroy became a columnist for the online publication World of Superheroes.

Conroy transferred the management of the Eagle Awards to his teenage daughter Cassandra in 2009 (although Mike stayed on as advisor). The 2009 Awards were canceled, however, due to a "lack of nominations." The 2010–2012 awards were presented at the London MCM Expo, but a rift between MCM and the Conroys caused no Eagles to be awarded in 2013. The Conroys decided to continue the awards separate from MCM, and in April 2014 it was announced that the award would be presented at the London Film and Comic Con (LFCC) and be renamed: first "The Stan Lee Eagle Award" and then the "True Believer Comic Awards." The inaugural True Believer Comics Awards were presented July 12, 2014, at the London Film and Comic Con; they have not been awarded since.

== Bibliography ==
- 500 Comicbook Action Heroes (Chrysalis/Collins & Brown, 2002) ISBN 9781844110049
- 500 Comicbook Villains (Chrysalis/Collins & Brown, 2004) ISBN 9781843402053
- War Stories: A Graphic History (ILEX Press/HarperCollins, 2009) ISBN 9780061731129 — foreword by Garth Ennis
