= Asia Alfasi =

Libyan-British comic writer and artist

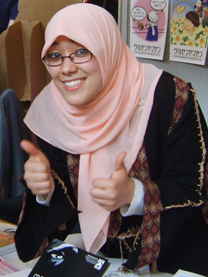
- Asia Alfasi at the Bristol International Comic Expo in 2007
- Born: April 20, 1984 (age 42); Libya
- Known for: JinNarration, The non-savvy non-commuter
- Style: comic artist

Asia Alfasi (born 20 April 1984) is a Libyan-British manga-influenced comic writer and artist. She was born in Libya and moved to Scotland at the age of 7. She lives in Birmingham, England and works at Ark Victoria Academy, Small Heath, Birmingham Her works synthesise Islamic, Libyan, British, and Japanese influences. She first gained notoriety when she was the first female to participate in and win the Hi8us Midlands Stripsearch competition with a portfolio based on her character Monir.

== Publications ==
Since she first started creating comics professionally in 2003, Asia has released two major publications. Her first major work, "JinNarration", was published in the Mammoth Book of Best New Manga, an anthology of works by up-and-coming young British comic artists. Her short semi-autobiographical story, "The non-savvy non-commuter", was displayed on the walls of Piccadilly Circus tube station as part of Thin Cities, the celebration of the 100th anniversary of the station's opening. It was on display from 15 December 2006 to 31 April 2007. Her first individually published graphic novel will detail the adventures of a young Muslim girl and the events of her life in both Libya and Scotland. It is due to be released by Bloomsbury this year. Asia is currently also working on converting a play into a graphic novel which is due to be published in August. The play, for which Asia had earlier designed the poster, is called Looking for Yoghurt, and is performed by the Birmingham Repertory Theatre Company, Joyful Theatre and Kijimuna Festa in association with Hanyong Theatre. A third book that she is working on is called The Adventures of Joseph and Jasmine and will also be out by the end of the year.

== Events ==
Following a period of absence from the public scene, Asia has attended several events since the start of 2009. She has appeared at the Highlands International Comics Expo, the Hi-Ex, on 14 and 15 February in Inverness, Scotland. On 10 and 11 May she attended the Bristol International Comic Expo, and later that month she also attended the London MCM. During this year, Asia attended the CAPTION comics festival in Oxford on 15 and 16 August. She was also at BICS, the British International Comics Show on 3 and 4 October, and the second London MCM Expo on 24 and 25 October of 2009.
