= Starburst (magazine) =

British science fiction magazine and webzine

- Editor-in-Chief: Martin Unsworth
- Former editors: Dez Skinn (1977–81); Alan McKenzie (1981-85); Stephen Payne (1985–99, 2002, 2005–09); Andrew Cartmel (2001)
- Categories: Science fiction, fantasy, horror
- Frequency: Quarterly
- Publisher: Starburst Magazine Limited
- Founder: Dez Skinn
- First issue: 1 December 1977; 48 years ago
- Company: Starburst Magazine Limited
- Country: United Kingdom
- Based in: Manchester
- Language: English
- Website: www.starburstmagazine.com
- ISSN: 0955-114X
- OCLC: 79615651

Starburst is a British science fiction, fantasy, and horror entertainment magazine published by Starburst Magazine Limited. It contains news, interviews, features, and reviews of genre material in various media, including TV, film, soundtracks, multimedia, books, and comics books. Established in December 1977 by editor Dez Skinn, the magazine is published quarterly, with additional news and reviews being published daily on the website.

Originally launched by Starburst Publishing Ltd., the title was acquired by Marvel UK in 1978 before transitioning to Visual Imagination in 1985, under whose tenure it ran until a publication hiatus in 2008. The brand was subsequently revived under new ownership in 2011, initially transitioning to a digital webzine format before returning to print circulation the following year. Now headquartered in Manchester, England, the brand has also expanded to include active podcast syndication, weekly radio programming, and periodic independent film and fantasy conventions.

== Publication history ==
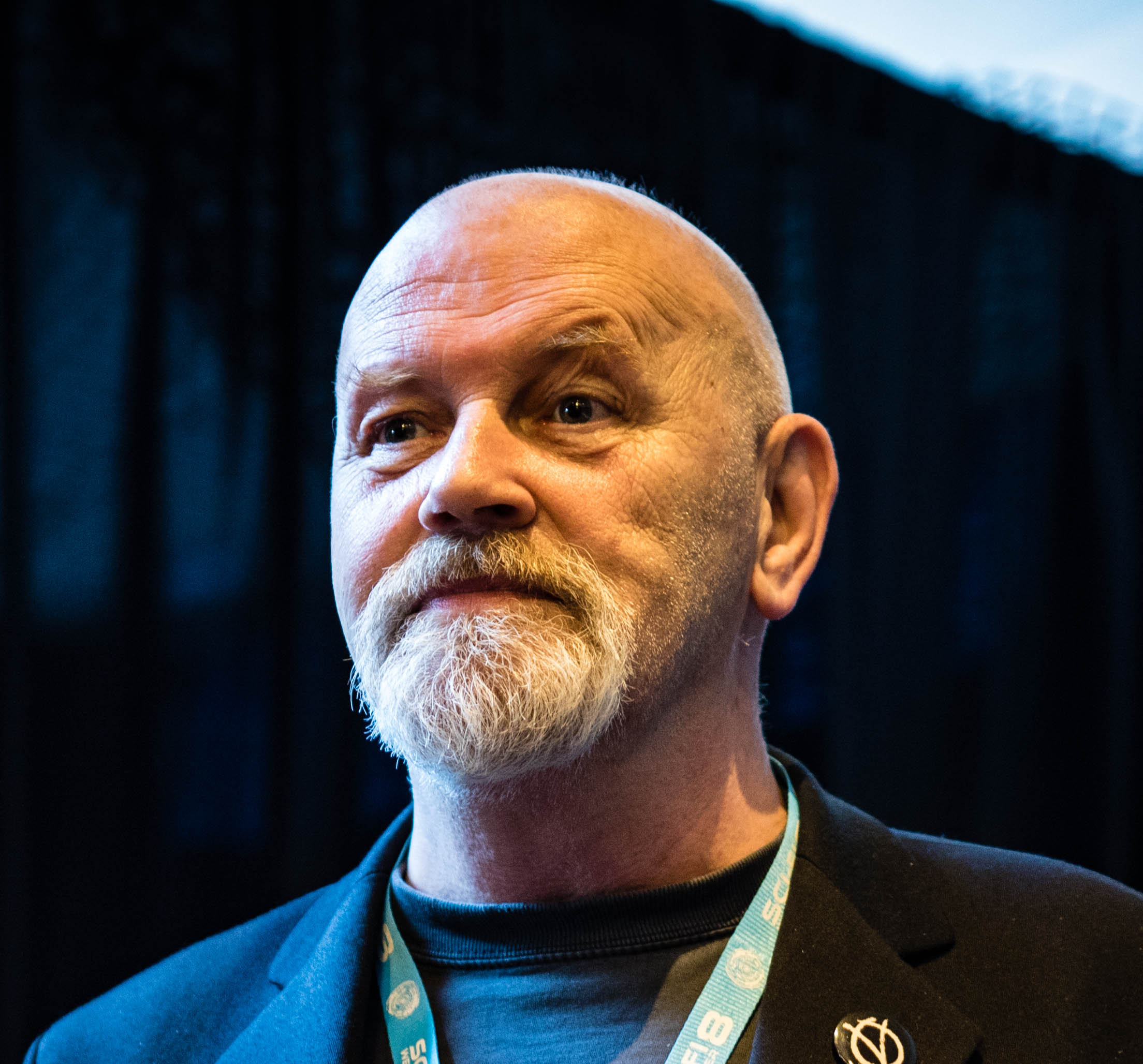
Dez Skinn

Starburst was launched in December 1977 by editor Dez Skinn with his own company Starburst Publishing Ltd. The name Starburst was settled on after rejecting other names, including Starfall, as Skinn considered it too negative.

Starburst was taken over by Marvel UK with issue #4, as part of deal whereby Skinn was put in charge of the UK comic reprints division. Marvel put the title up for sale in 1985 and it was bought by Visual Imagination and published by them from issue #88. Having reached issue #365 in 2008, the magazine ceased publishing due to Visual Imagination folding.

In early 2011 Starburst Magazine Ltd announced that Starburst would resume publication as an online magazine. Founder Dez Skinn was named Honorary Editor-in-Chief. The first online issue (#366) was released on 14 May 2011, and carried an editorial by Skinn. Starburst was returned to print publication by Starburst Magazine Ltd in February 2012, with issue #374.

The magazine celebrated its 40-year anniversary with issue #443 (2017), which included an editorial by creator Dez Skinn. Starburst headquarters is now based in Manchester.

== Editors-in-chief ==
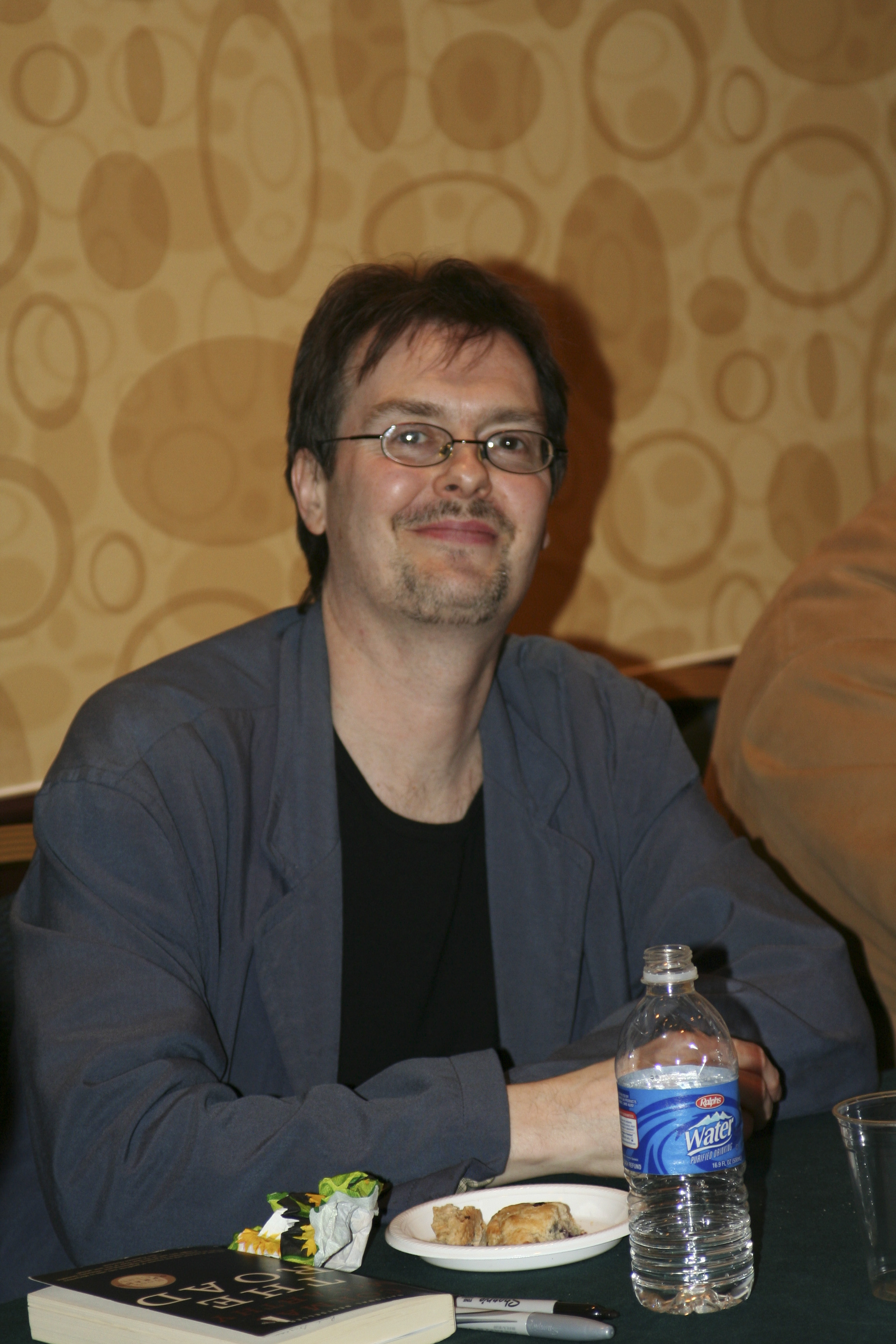
Andrew Cartmel

- 1977–81: Dez Skinn
- 1981–85: Alan McKenzie
- 1985: Cefn Ridout
- 1985–99: Stephen Payne
- 1999–2001: David Richardson
- 2001: Andrew Cartmel
- 2001–02: Gary Gillatt
- 2002: Stephen Payne
- 2003–05: Simon J. Gerard
- 2005–09: Stephen Payne
- 2009–22: Jordan Royce
- 2022–25: Kris Heys
- 2025-present: Martin Unsworth

== Columns and features ==
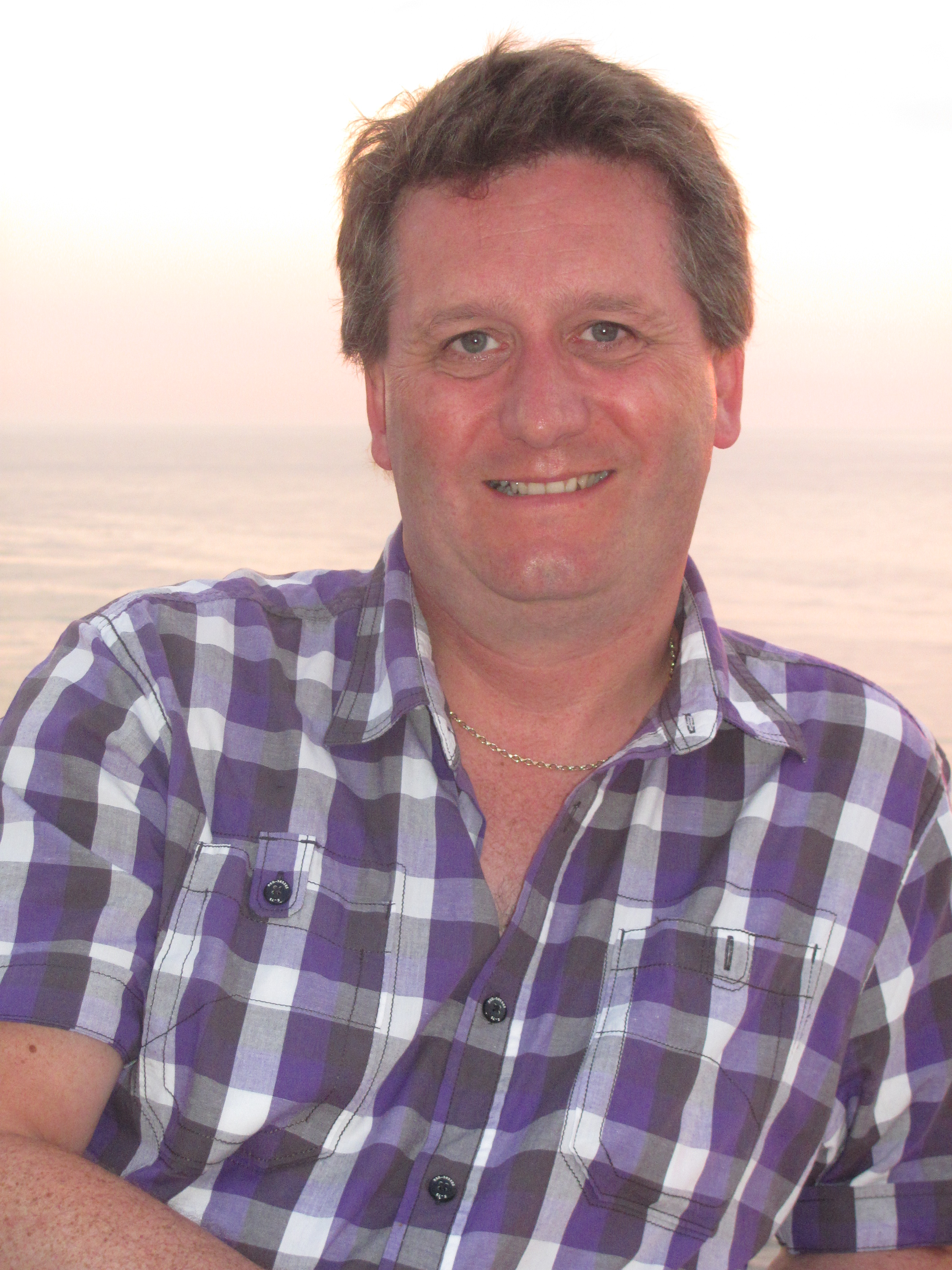
David J. Howe

Starburst's review sections were edited by writers and reviewers such as Alan Jones, who covered upcoming cinema features, and David J. Howe, who oversaw the literary review section.

For several years, the magazine also carried a column by the writer John Brosnan, up until his passing. Its television review column, TV Zone, was used as the title of its sister publication, TV Zone.

=== Current columns ===
Columns include:

- "TV Zone" by Paul Mount
- "It's Only a Movie" by Editor-in-Chief Jordan Royce; previously penned by the late John Brosnan
- "Horror Obscura" by Assistant Editor Martin Unsworth
- "Brave New Words" (books) and "Roll for Damage" (TTRPGS) by literary editor Ed Fortune
- "OST" by Nick Spacek
- "Monsters University" by Laura Potier
- "Kaiju Alert" by James Hanton

== Multimedia ==
=== Starburst radio ===
On 19 March 2011 Starburst magazine presented its first weekly radio show on Manchester Radio Online. The show has since moved to Fab Radio International.

=== Starburst podcasts ===
Starburst produces the following podcasts:

- Starburst Radio Podcast: The podcast of the Official Starburst Radio Show presented by Martin Unsworth, Kris Heys and Mike Royce
- The Blue Box Podcast: The Starburst Doctor Who podcast presented by JR Southall
- Brave New Words: The Starburst book and graphic novel podcast presented by Ed Fortune, the magazine's literary editor
- TV Zone Plus: The podcast of the TV Zone column, presented by TV Zone columnist Paul Mount and Scott Holmes

== Starburst festivals ==
=== 1980: Marvel Comics Film & Fantasy Convention ===
On 18–19 October 1980, Starburst (at that point owned by Marvel UK) produced the inaugural Marvel Comics Film & Fantasy Convention at Lawrence Hall, London. The guest of honor was Ray Harryhausen; other guests include Barry Morse, Paul Darrow, Jacqueline Pearce, Ingrid Pitt, Caroline Munro, Dana Gillespie, David Prowse, Peter Mayhew, Milton Subotsky, Roy Ashton, Martin Bower, Harley Cokeliss, Brian Johnson, Terrance Dicks, David Maloney, Dick Mills, and Richard O'Brien. The convention included the presentation of the 1980 Starburst Awards as well as the 1980 Eagle Awards.

=== 2016: Starburst International Film Festival ===
From 26–28 August 2016 the first Starburst International Film Festival was held at Manchester Metropolitan Students' Union Complex. Guests included Dez Skinn, Doug Naylor, Steve Pemberton, and Toby Whithouse. The festival culminated in the Starburst Fantasy Awards 2016 on Sunday 28 August 2016 in which Doug Naylor won the Hall of Fame Award.

=== 2018: Starburst MediaCity Festival ===
With a sponsorship deal secured with MediaCityUK the second annual festival was slightly re-branded. Starburst MediaCity Festival was held 16–17 March 2018. Guests included Dez Skinn and Tom Paton. Winners of the STARBURST Fantasy Awards 2018 included Emma Dark for Best Director with Salient Minus Ten, and Michael Melski for Best Feature with The Child Remains.

== See also ==
- Cinefantastique – American horror and science fiction film magazine
- SFX – British sci-fi and fantasy media magazine
- Starlog – American science fiction media publication founded in 1976
- The Dark Side – British horror film magazine
