= Hi-Ex =

Comics convention in Scotland, 2008-2012

- Status: Defunct
- Genre: Comics
- Venue: Eden Court Theatre
- Location: Inverness
- Country: Scotland
- Inaugurated: February 2008
- Most recent: 2012
- Organizer: Richmond Clements, Vicky Stonebridge

Hi-Ex (short for Highlands International Comics Expo) was a name given to a Scottish comics convention held from 2008 to 2012. It was held early of each year in Eden Court Theatre, Inverness (up to 2012). The organizers were Richmond Clements (editor at FutureQuake Publishing) and Vicky Stonebridge.

The convention was the Center of a range of other events organized to promote comics in the region, including "outreach visits" to schools (involving Kev F. Sutherland), with the help of the Highland Council and Scottish Arts Council, and an exhibition of comic art in Eden Court's gallery. Richmond Clements quoted: "Over the years Scots have had a surprising influence on comic art and script writing.

== History ==
The idea for the convention emerged from the lack of a major comics convention in the area and a discussion Richmond Clements and Vicky Stonebridge had with Eden Court's Judith Aitken, about possibly bringing in a few guest speakers. Through contacts made because of their involvement with the British small press comics they were able to speak to a wide number of professional comic creators and the event rapidly grew into a full weekend. They received advice from people who had experience in running conventions, including Michael Carroll, who chaired the Irish national science fiction convention, Octocon, and the Comic Expo's Mike Allwood. Hi-Ex has been used by the BBC as an example of how the Internet has helped facilitate developments in the Highlands and Islands. Clements is quoted as saying "Practically the entire event was organized through e-mail."

Northings, the Highlands and Islands Art Journal, described the first convention as "inspirational," and said that "by the end of the weekend I felt like a door had been opened on a whole genre of art that I hadn’t engaged with before." Of those that attended, Gary Erskine declared it a "complete success."

In 2011 the gathering was cancelled due to lack of sponsorships, and time conflicts. The convention wasn't able to hold an event "fans and guests deserved." The exhibition for comic art and script writing was due to be held at Eden Court March 26 - 27th prior to the event's cancellation. the show returned in 2012.

=== Dates and locations ===
Dates	Location	Attendance	Notable guests	Notes
2–3 February 2008	Eden Court Theatre, Inverness	...	Frank Quitely, Mike McMahon, Alan Grant, Kev F. Sutherland, Cam Kennedy, Colin MacNeil, John Higgins, Gary Erskine, and Rufus Dayglo	Poor weather meant Alan Grant was unable to attend and run a script writing workshop but Al Ewing, Declan Shalvey and Ben Clark filled in for him. Also there were the 501st Legion UK Garrison and a Predator.
14–15 February 2009	Eden Court Theatre, Inverness	...	John Higgins, Leah Moore, Mike McMahon, and Frank Quitely.	Coinciding with the launch of the Watchmen film, the 2009 event had a general Watchmen feel, with the presence of colorist Higgins and Alan Moore's daughter Leah. As it also coincided with Valentine's Day it included a debate on romance comics, and romance in comics in general.
27–28 March 2010	Eden Court Theatre, Inverness	...	Charlie Adlard, Asia Alfasi, Gary Erskine, Simon Fraser, John Higgins, Cam Kennedy, Gary Northfield, and Kev F. Sutherland	Sponsorship by Highland Council grant for outreach and additional activities
31 March – 1 April 2012	Eden Court Theatre, Inverness	...	Michael Carroll, Al Ewing, John Higgins, Sally Hurst, and Chris Murray	Raffle raises £1907 for Children First charity
