= Comic Festival =

Defunct British comic book convention

Comic Festival / Comics 99
- Status: Defunct
- Genre: Comics
- Venue: Various
- Location: Bristol
- Country: England, UK
- Inaugurated: 2 April 1999; 27 years ago (as Comics 99)
- Most recent: 2004
- Attendance: 2,500 (1999)
- Organiser: Kev F. Sutherland; Mike Allwood
- Website: comicfestival.co.uk

Comic Festival (also known as Comics Festival UK) was a British comic book convention which was held annually in Bristol between 1999 and 2004. It was devised and produced by Kev F. Sutherland with the help of Mike Allwood of Area 51 Comics.

The presentation of the National Comics Awards was a regular feature of Comic Festival from 1999 to 2003 (except for the year 2000, when the Eagle Awards were presented there). Charity auctions were held every year at the festival, first for Comic Relief and then for the benefit of ChildLine.

== History ==
Comic Festival was preceded as an annual British comic convention by the United Kingdom Comic Art Convention, held annually (usually in London) from 1985 to 1998. By 1999, the comics audience in the UK was in decline; Comic Festival's aim was to reach non-comic readers, children, and families, and to enable them to enter the event at the cheapest possible prices. Once inside the convention, the audience would then be exposed to the widest range of comics material, thus building the readership of the future.

The festival began under the name Comics 99.

In addition to the annual Bristol-based Comic Festival, secondary events were held in London in the fall of 2003 and 2004.

Comic Festival was succeeded as an annual convention by the Bristol-based Comic Expo, which began in 2004 and lasted until 2014.

== Charity auctions ==
For Comics 99, Sutherland produced The World's Biggest Comic, which featured the work of 100 of the world's leading comic artists, auctioned to raise money for the British charity Comic Relief.

Subsequent projects, for the benefit of ChildLine, included the Charity Deck of Cards which, in 2001, raised over £10,000 through the auctioning of the original art and sales of the limited edition decks. The Just 1 Page charity comic was produced at Comic Festival, beginning in 2001 (and then continuing on at Comic Expo).

=== Locations and dates ===
| Dates | Venue/Location | Official guests | Notes |
|---|---|---|---|
| 2–4 April 1999 | Watershed Media Center and Swallow Royal, Bristol | Phil Winslade, Steve Pugh, Steve Dillon, Scott Dunbier, Peter Hogan, Grant Morrison, Charlie Adlard, Kev F. Sutherland, Glenn Fabry, Metaphrog, Al Davison, Dave Gibbons, Bryan Talbot, Shelly Roeberg, Kyle Baker, John McCrea, Rich Johnston, Gary Spencer Millidge, and Jamie Delano | Known as Comics 99; 2,500 attendees |
| 23–24 April 2000 | Jurys Bristol Hotel, Bristol | Steve Pugh, Jim Valentino, Dave Gibbons, Mike Carlin, Gary Spencer Millidge, Alan Grant, Laura DePuy, Karen Berger, Chris Staros, Dave McKinnon, James Hodgkins, Dez Skinn, Gary Marshall, Al Davison, and Grant Morrison | Known as Comics 2000; presentation of the Eagle Awards, MC'd by Simon Pegg |
| 26–27 May 2001 | Bristol | Eddie Campbell, D'Israeli, Gary Spencer Millidge, Tony Rollinson, Tim Sayer, Dave Gibbons, Staz Johnson, Sean Phillips, Charlie Adlard, Greg Staple, Metaphrog, Bob Schreck, Alan Grant, John McCrea, Dez Skinn, Steve Conley, and Lee Barnett | Known as Comics 2001 |
| 1–2 June 2002 | British Empire and Commonwealth Museum, Temple Quay, Bristol | Joe Quesada, Jamie S. Rich, Grant Morrison, Frank Quitely, John McCrea, William Christensen, Terry Wiley, Woodrow Phoenix, Bevis Musson, Gary Spencer Millidge, Rich Johnston, Patty Jeres, Lee Kennedy, Roger Langridge, James Hodgkins, Heidi MacDonald, Dave Gibbons, Lee Barnett, Mike Conroy, Dez Skinn, Mark Buckingham, Karen Berger, and Jim Valentino. | Known as Comics 2002; part of Bristol 2008 (Bristol's bid to become European Capital of Culture in 2008) |
| 23–24 May 2003 | Commonwealth Centre, Temple Meads, Bristol | Jim Lee, Jeff Smith, Dez Skinn, Mike Conroy, Duncan Fegredo, Steve Yeowell, Gary Spencer Millidge, Phil Winslade, Sean Phillips, Mike Carey, Chris Weston, Chris Francis, Phill Hall, Bryan Talbot, Dave Gibbons, John McCrea, John Cassaday, D'Israeli, Staz Johnson, Gary Erskine, Rich Johnston, Nick Locking, and David Hitchcock | Known as Comics 2003 |
| 23–24 May 2004 | Ramada Plaza, Bristol | Gary Spencer Millidge, Bob Finch, Norman Lovett, John McCrea, Duncan Fegredo, David Roach, Rob Williams, Jon Foster, and Gary Erskine | |

=== London Comic Festival locations and dates ===
| Dates | Venue/Location | Official guests | Notes |
|---|---|---|---|
| 1 November 2003 | Holiday Inn London, Bloomsbury, London | Steven Appleby, Mark Buckingham, John M. Burns, Laurence Campbell, Al Davison, Alex Collier, Mike Conroy, Andy Diggle, Simon Donald, Christian Dunn, Ian Edginton, Carl Flint, Paul Gambaccini, Phil Gascoigne, Ian Gibson, Jon Haward, Morris Heggie, P. J. Holden, Jock, Davey Jones, Euan Kerr, Roger Langridge, Metaphrog, Gary Spencer Millidge, Robbie Morrison, Paul Palmer, Jonathan Ross, Siku, Dez Skinn, Kev F. Sutherland, and Lee Townsend | Known as Comic Festival Winter Special |
| 23 October 2004 | Holiday Inn London, Bloomsbury, London | Gary Spencer Millidge | Known as London Comic Festival |
