= Borderline (magazine) =

British magazine about comics

- Editor: Phill Hall
- Categories: comic books news and criticism
- Frequency: Monthly
- Publisher: mediahall
- First issue: August 2001
- Final issue: March 2003
- Country: Great Britain
- Language: English
- Website: borderline-pdf.blogspot.com

Borderline was a comics magazine created by former Comics International news and features editor Phill Hall, which was published from 2001 to 2003. Borderline was the first PDF comics magazine available to read on a computer or as a print-out.

Borderline was a cross between The Comics Journal and the NME, with a heavy mix of mainstream American/British and international comic books. Comic books and creators from countries such as Brazil, Poland, and the Philippines were featured alongside American and British comic book icons.

== History ==
Borderline was launched as a free download in August 2001. Founder Phill Hall said in a 2007 interview with Comics Village that the decision to create Borderline came from the growing number of grassroots comics fans who wanted more than just to read magazines about Marvel and DC comics. The magazine's remit was to highlight areas of the comics industry that were neglected by the other magazines about comics.

By issue #3, the magazine had gained an audience of over 150,000 readers, much of this due to features on Brazilian and South American comics. Hall attributes the publicity gained in South America from the magazine's good relationship with Mauricio de Sousa Produções, Brazil's leading comics publisher.

Due to Borderline's large readership and independent bias, the magazine had exclusive interviews with people who wouldn't normally give interviews, such as Chris Ware, Steve Gerber, and Charles Burns.

Despite the success, after twenty monthly issues and one special, the magazine folded in March 2003, shortly after it started to charge $1. According to the magazine's publisher, Martin Shipp, only an average of 100 people paid to buy issues 17 to 20 of the magazine, with the majority of those sales from either South America, Europe or comics creators who had been featured in the magazine's pages. Sales in countries where the magazine was intended to target, UK or USA, were nominal.

In October 2003, Phill Hall and Martin Shipp attended the Łódź comic convention. Invited as one of the major guests for the event (along with Pat Mills and Clint Langley), Shipp said in an interview that it was "one of the most humbling experiences of my life. A place where the people behind the scenes are treated just as importantly as the people who produce the actual comics." Hall said on his blog in 2008, "It was a fitting swan song to the project, but it left us feeling like we owed Europe and South America far more than any of the people we thought we were doing it for. It was a valiant experiment, which by today's standards, still stands up extremely well."

The following summer, the Borderline Summer Special was released, still a PDF but in standard magazine format; the slimmed-down editorial team made promises of new issues, but none have yet to materialise. Former Borderline features editor Jay Eales later recently resurrected much of the content, aiming it at a new audience, via his website factorfictionpress.co.uk.

== Content ==
Regular features in Borderline included columns by Kevin Hill (manga), Mike Kidson (history of comics), Selina Locke (women in comics), Jay Eales (independent comics), as well as opinion columns from Martin Shipp, Andrew Cheverton, and others.

== Notable contributors ==
The principal contributors to Borderline were Phill Hall, Martin Shipp, Mike Kidson, Andrew Cheverton, Arnold T. Blumberg, Carol Close, Jay Eales, Rik Offenberger Andrew Winter; press and publicity was handled by Danny Black.

Others involved in the magazine's creation and continuation included Mike Conroy, Pete Ashton, Andrew Luke, Paul Gravett, Ian Richardson, Frazer Irving, Kevin Schomburg, Selina Lock, Adrian Kermode & Terry Wiley, Christopher Spicer, and Paul Rainey.

== Awards ==
At the 2002 National Comics Awards in the United Kingdom, Borderline won the Best Specialist Magazine or Website award. The following year, despite having folded, the magazine finished second in the same category.
