= Frantic Magazine =

Marvel comic series

Frantic Magazine is a comic book series published by Marvel UK from 1979 to 1980. Part of Dez Skinn's revamp of the company, the title was a thinly disguised copy of Mad Magazine. It contained the first published work of Alan Davis, as well as early scripts by Alan Moore.

Individual issues contained a collection of parodies of popular culture - movies, TV series and printed adverts. These were mostly self-contained items that appeared in a single issue, though an ongoing strip featured the adventures of Howard the Duck. Many of these features were reprints from the magazine's US counterpart, Crazy Magazine. Thus, the humour often relied on American slang, phrasing and cultural references - not well known to comics readers in the UK in that era - as well as more than passing familiarity with characters from Marvel Comics.

The magazine's mascot and cover character was an import from Crazy – a sinister clown called Obnoxio The Clown.
