= Comics International =

British news and reviews magazine about comic books

- The cover of Comics International #200 (Nov. 2006).
- Editor-in-chief: Dez Skinn (1990–2006); Mike Conroy (2006–2010)
- News Editor: Phill Hall (c. 1990–1997); Mike Conroy (1997–2006)
- Categories: Comic books news/criticism
- Frequency: Monthly
- Publisher: Quality Communications (1990–2006); Cosmic Publications Ltd. (2006–2010)
- Founded: 1990
- Final issue: 2010
- Country: United Kingdom
- Language: English

Comics International was a British news and reviews magazine about comic books. Founded in 1990, it was published monthly by Quality Communications until 2006, and then by Cosmic Publications Ltd. until 2010.

Over time, Comics International became quite popular, often outselling the very comics it covered. Being so comprehensive in content, Comics International was carried by many leading UK reference libraries. The magazine was given the National Comics Award for "Best Specialist Comics Publication" four times in six years.

== Overview ==
Described in Time Out as the NME of comics, Comics International provided up-to-date news and reviews of comics from around the world. There was a particular focus upon the British comics scene, including British comics creators, conventions and comics-related events, and information on British comics retailers. Comics International featured a question-and-answer section with responses by comics experts, as well as a lively letters page.

Originally printed in black-and-white on newsprint, the magazine later featured full-colour glossy covers with interior colour pages.

== History ==
The magazine was published and edited by Quality Communications owner Dez Skinn for its first two hundred issues, from 1990 to 2006 (Skinn's Dez Sez column appeared in each issue during this time).

With the magazine's sale to Cosmic Publications in 2006 (and Skinn's departure as editor), news editor Mike Conroy was promoted to editor with issue #201. Conroy had taken over the main news section of the magazine in 1997 from Phill Hall. Conroy announced a new direction for the magazine under his editorship:

My vision can be distilled down to a news-driven blend of Amazing Heroes and Starlog's Comics Scene presented with CI’s traditional level playing field approach and straightforward reportage. I’d like to think that we can capture the middle ground between Wizard’s irreverent hyperbole, The Comics Journal’s serious, intellectual approach and whatever it is Comics Buyer's Guide has to offer.

After the editorial changeover, however, the magazine's frequency became increasingly sporadic, casting doubt on its long-term future under the new editorial team. In May 2010, Cosmic Publications was dissolved, thus confirming that Comics International had ended, after publishing only eight regular issues (and a few specials) under its new regime.

== Regular features ==
In addition to Dez Skinn's own editorial column, Comics International's main features included:

- Frame to Frame, a long-running column by Mike Conroy on the interaction between movies and comics
- Talking Shop, a column about British comics retailing by Stephen L. Holland, owner of the Nottingham-based shop Page 45
- It's Only a Comic, a humorous column from the creator's side by Tony Lee
- Novel Graphics, a column about graphic novels by Paul Gravett; this column originated in Borderline magazine
- Networks, Internet comics gossip by Tim Pilcher; Pilcher went on to become associate editor of CI
- Illuminations, upcoming news of future comic releases by Martin Averre
- Movers & Shakers, the comics industry's first gossip and marketing column; voted the magazine's most popular column in a poll conducted in 1997. Created by former Comics International news and features editor Phill Hall
- Hotshots, a top ten picks column originally by Phil Hall and later by Martin Averre
- The World of Jack Staff, a serialised comic strip by Paul Grist
- Comic Cuts, by Mike Kazybrid, a three-panel gag strip
- Outside the Frame, by John Freeman/Nick Miller, a three-panel gag strip

In addition, there was a lengthy review section by a regular team of over twenty reviewers, a festivals calendar, and listings of U.K. comics specialty stores, mail-order companies, and the following month's U.K. & U.S. releases.

== Awards ==
- 1997 National Comics Award for Best Specialist Comics Publication
- 1999 National Comics Award for Best Specialist Comics Publication
- 2001 National Comics Award for Best Specialist Magazine or Website
- 2003 National Comics Award for Best Specialist Magazine or Website

== See also ==
- Comics Buyer's Guide
- Wizard
