= North Texas Comic Book Show =

The North Texas Comic Book Show was a quarterly comic book convention that was held in Dallas. The event was created in October 2011 as an alternative to the larger comic conventions. Initially held in Arlington, Texas, the event moved to Dallas in November 2013. It has also been referred to as the Dallas Comic Book Show in marketing and the media.

Started as a comic collectors event the show grew to play host to a number of nationally know comic artists and celebrities. Guests included Tom DeFalco, Rich Buckler, Ron Frenz, Mike Grell, Paul Coker Jr., Scott Hanna, Mark Morales, Ron Marz, Danny Fingeroth, Tom Raney, Michael Golden, Tom Richmond, Randy Emberlin, James O'Barr, Keith Pollard, Arvell Jones, Craig Rousseau, Victor Gischler, Carlo Barberi, Lou Ferrigno, Gigi Edgley, and Richard Hatch.

The event was held in January, April, July, and October/November each year.

The February 2020 show, hosted at the Irving Convention Center, was apparently the last.
