= Harry Harrison (cartoonist) =

British political cartoonist (born 1961)

- Born: Harry Harrison; 12 May 1961 (age 65); England
- Known for: Illustration, cartoons

Harry Harrison (born 5 December 1961) is a British born political cartoonist and illustrator based in Hong Kong. He is best known as the principal political cartoonist for the South China Morning Post (SCMP). However, he also illustrates children's books and provides satirical cartoons to many journals in the South China area.

== Biography ==
Harry Harrison was born in England, but because his father was in the Air Force, he travelled, spending time in Libya and Singapore as well as Britain. He left school at 16 and took up a junior position in a supermarket, moving through a variety of careers and finally into illustration.

In 1994 he moved from England to Hong Kong where he now lives on Lamma Island. Harry plays part-time in a band called the Yung Shue Wan Curs - a play on words relating to the village, Yung Shue Wan, near which he lives.

== Cartoons ==
Harry Harrison is probably best known for his daily cartoons in the SCMP which have appeared since 2001. He is the principal cartoonist for the paper, his work appearing six days a week.

Harry collaborates with Sarah Brennan on children's books. His most prominent works include a series on Chinese zodiac animals such as Oswald Ox, Run Run Rat and Temujin the Tiger. He is also the illustrator of the 'Dirty Story' series.

His works have appeared in a variety of journals such as The Guardian, Time magazine, Asia Wall Street Journal, International Finance Review, and Far Eastern Economic Review.

His book Add Ink: Cartoon chronicles of life in Hong Kong, a compilation of cartoons from the South China Morning Post from 2014-2021, was published in 2021.

Harrison has won many awards for his work including top Editorial Cartooning recognition at the Society of Publishers in Asia Editorial Awards 2012 and a special prize for a body of work at the Hong Kong 14th Human Rights Press Awards.

== Relationship to the author ==
Harry is commonly confused with the science fiction author of the same name. The Guardian newspaper in the UK printed a cartoon by Harry Harrison 16 February 2008 edition, along with the caption, "Harry Harrison is a comics artist, writer and editor specialising in science fiction. His book Make Room! Make Room! was adapted for the cult film Soylent Green." A correction and clarification were published three days later.

== Influences ==
Carl Giles and Ronald Searle are quoted as significant role models. In particular, Ronald Searle has been a major influence on him because of the 'darkness' associated with his work. Harry attributes this dark edge to Searle's near-death experiences as a POW in the Second World War.
