= Dhaka Pop Culture Expo =

Multi-genre fan convention in Bangladesh

Dhaka Pop Culture Expo was a convention for fans of comic books, film, TV, anime and video games, held in the Bangladeshi capital of Dhaka. The first event was held on Friday and Saturday 30–31 August 2013 at Baridhara DOHS Convention Center, Dhaka; it was attended by over 2,000 participants. The 2014 expo was staged 24–25 June 2014 at the National Shooting Federation Hall in Dhaka. The third edition took place 31 July and 1 August 2015. The expo returned in July 2016, and June 2017.

== Background ==
Comic-cons and pop expos are popular in the US, UK, Australia, and Japan.

Dhaka Comicon was first held in 2012. It was followed in 2013 by Dhaka Pop Culture Expo, and later that year by Unmad-JCC Comic Con.
