= National Comics Awards =

British comic book award series

National Comics Award
- Location: Bristol
- Country: United Kingdom
- Presented by: Jonathan Ross and Paul Gambaccini (1997)
- Hosted by: United Kingdom Comic Art Convention (1997–1998); Comic Festival (1999, 2001–2003)
- First award: 1997
- Final award: 2003

The National Comics Awards was a series of awards for comic book titles and creators given out on an annual basis from 1997 to 2003 (with the exception of the year 2000) for comics published in the United Kingdom the previous year. The votes were by the U.K. comics fan community, and were open to anyone.

The Awards were founded in 1997 by comic creators Kev F Sutherland and Mark Buckingham. They took over for the UK Comic Art Awards, which were presented from 1990 to 1997 (which had themselves replaced the Eagle Awards, which were the dominant British comics awards from 1977 to 1990). The National Comics Awards were distinguished by the distinctive "Jimmy" statue designed by Buckingham.

== Structure and categories ==
The National Comics Awards were awarded by UK comics fans voting for work produced during the previous year. Financial supporters of the awards could have their companies' names added to an individual award, as well as having a representative of the business present the award at the ceremony.

The National Comics Awards were presented to individual creators as well as for publications and characters. There was also a section of the awards devoted to all-time lists. From 1997 to 1999, voters were required to pay to vote for the "Best Comic Ever" category, with all proceeds going to charity: in 1997 the category was "Best British Comic Ever," in 1998 it was "Best Comic in the World Ever," and in 1999 it was "Best Comic of the 20th Century" (with all proceeds going to the ChildLine Charity).

== History ==
The first National Comics Awards presentation took place 15 March 1997 at United Kingdom Comic Art Convention (UKCAC) in London, presented by Jonathan Ross and Paul Gambaccini.

In 1998 the Awards took place at the Manchester UKCAC.

The Awards were held at the Bristol Comic Festival in 1999, and from 2001 to 2003. There were no National Comics Awards presented in 2000, as the Eagle Awards were revived that year.

The 2002 Awards were hosted by Kev F Sutherland. Presenters included Mike Conroy and Dez Skinn of Comics International, Martin Averre of Ace Comics, Dave Finn of Incognito Comics, Mark Buckingham, Nick Parry-Jones of Red Route Distribution, The Comedian from Watchmen and Alice in Wonderland (a.k.a. character costume models Doug Oliver and Andrea Sanders), Dave Gibbons, Karen Berger, Jonathan Bryans and Bryan Liddiard of Naturesguard, Carol Bennett of Knockabout Comics, Rich Johnston, Alex Summersby of MacUnlimited, and Jim Valentino.

The 2003 awards, presented in London at that year's Comic Festival, were sponsored by Red Route Distribution, Ace Comics, Incognito Comics, Tripwire, Knockabout Comics, SFX magazine, Bulletproof Comics, Comics International, Borders Books, and Diamond Previews.

After 2003 the major UK comics awards again became the Eagle Awards, until 2012 (2014) when they were discontinued.

== Awards ==
=== Individual awards ===
==== Best Writer / Best Writer in Comics Today/Now ====
- 1997: Garth Ennis
- 1998: Grant Morrison
- 1999: John Wagner
- 2001: John Wagner, for Button Man and Judge Dredd (both in 2000 AD)
- 2002: Grant Morrison
  - Alan Moore
  - Warren Ellis
  - John Wagner
  - Brian Michael Bendis
  - Garth Ennis
  - Frank Miller
  - Anonymous (The Beano)
  - Robbie Morrison
  - Neil Gaiman
- 2003: Dan Abnett
  - John Wagner
  - Grant Morrison
  - Alan Moore
  - Brian Michael Bendis
  - Mark Millar
  - Garth Ennis
  - Mike Carey
  - Gordon Rennie
  - Andy Diggle

==== Best Artist / Best Artist in Comics Today/Now ====
- 1997: Alex Ross
- 1998: Steve Dillon
- 1999: Alex Ross
- 2001: Carlos Ezquerra for Judge Dredd, Strontium Dog (2000 AD), and Just a Pilgrim (Black Bull Comics)
- 2002: Frank Quitely
  - Frazer Irving
  - Bryan Hitch
  - Carlos Ezquerra
  - John Cassaday
  - John Romita, Jr.
  - Frank Miller
  - Alan Davis
  - Steve Dillon
  - Alex Ross
- 2003 (sponsored by Ace Comics): Bryan Hitch
  - Henry Flint
  - Jock
  - Nick Brennan
  - Frazer Irving
  - Frank Quitely
  - Jim Lee
  - Karl Richardson
  - Steve Dillon
  - Carlos Ezquerra

==== Best New Talent ====
- 2001 (tie):
  - Frazer Irving, for Necronauts in 2000 AD
  - Jock, for Judge Dredd in 2000 AD
- 2002: Frazer Irving
  - John Watson
  - Mike Carey
  - Tan Eng Huat
  - Simon Spurrier
  - Nick Locking
  - Ed Brubaker
  - Geoff Johns
  - Jock
  - Judd Winick
- 2003 (sponsored by Tripwire): Andy Diggle (writer, Lady Constantine (DC), Snow Tiger (2000 AD))
  - Karl Richardson
  - Simon Spurrier
  - Andy Clarke
  - Antony Johnston
  - Frazer Irving
  - Brian K. Vaughan
  - Jai Sen
  - Dom Reardon
  - Bruce Jones

=== Publication awards ===
==== Best Comic (British) ====
- 1997: 2000 AD
- 1998: 2000 AD
- 1999: 2000 AD

==== Best Comic Now ====
- 2002: The Beano
  - 2000 AD
  - Transmetropolitan
  - New X-Men
  - Planetary
  - Lucifer
  - Batman: The Dark Knight Strikes Again
  - 100 Bullets
  - X-Force
  - Ultimate Spider-Man

==== Best Comic in the World Today ====
- 2001: 2000 AD, edited by Andy Diggle (Rebellion Developments)
- 2002: The Beano
  - 2000 AD
  - Watchmen
  - The Sandman
  - Preacher
  - X-Men
  - Batman: The Dark Knight Returns
  - Spider-Man
  - Batman
  - V for Vendetta
- 2003 (Comics International Award for Comic of the Year): 2000 AD
  - The Dandy
  - Warhammer Monthly
  - The Ultimates
  - The Beano
  - Judge Dredd Megazine
  - The League of Extraordinary Gentlemen
  - Fables
  - New X-Men
  - Daredevil
  - 100 Bullets
  - Batman
  - Hellblazer
  - Alias
  - Lucifer
  - Three Days in Europe
  - Y: The Last Man
  - The Amazing Spider-Man
  - The Filth
  - Ultimate X-Men

==== Best New Comic ====
- 1997:
  - British: Octobriana
  - Int'l: Hitman (DC Comics)
- 1998:
  - British: Gyre
  - Int'l: Transmetropolitan (DC)
- 1999:
  - British: Warhammer (Games Workshop)
    - Kane
    - Sleaze Castle
    - Strangehaven
    - The Beano
  - Int'l: The League of Extraordinary Gentlemen (DC/ABC)
- 2001: Green Arrow, by Kevin Smith and Phil Hester (DC Comics)
- 2002: Ultimates
  - The Establishment
  - New X-Men
  - Alias
  - Doom Patrol
  - Origin
  - Batman: The Dark Knight Strikes Again
  - Batgirl
  - Catwoman
  - Muties
- 2003: Y: The Last Man (Vertigo Comics)
  - Fables
  - Jack Staff
  - Three Days in Europe
  - The Filth
  - Lady Constantine
  - Courtney Crumrin
  - Pop London
  - The League of Extraordinary Gentlemen Vol. 2
  - Judge Dredd vs. Aliens

==== Best Self-Published/Independent ====
- 1997: Strangehaven, by Gary Spencer Millidge
- 1998: Kane, by Paul Grist
- 1999: Class of '79
- 2001: Petra Etcetera, by Terry Wiley, Dave McKinnon and Ady Kermode
- 2002: Zarjaz
  - Jack Staff
  - Strangehaven
  - Cerebus
  - Bone
  - Petra Etcetera
  - Hardly The Hog
  - Finder
  - Arsenic Lullaby
  - Diesel Sweeties
- 2003 (sponsored by Knockabout Comics): Jack Staff by Paul Grist
  - Zarjaz
  - Fred the Clown
  - The Girly Comic
  - Miranda
  - Oddcases
  - Strangehaven
  - 30 Days of Night
  - Bone
  - Devilchild

==== Best Comic (International) ====
- 1997: Preacher (DC Comics)
- 1998: Preacher (DC)
- 1999: Preacher

==== Best Cover ====
- 1997: Kingdom Come #1, by Alex Ross (DC Comics)

==== Best Individual Story ====
- 1997: Kingdom Come #1, by Mark Waid and Alex Ross (DC Comics)

==== Best Collected Series or Graphic Novel ====
- 1999: Superman For All Seasons
- 2003 (sponsored by Borders Books): Daemonifuge (Kev Walker and Jim Campbell) — Black Library Press
  - The League of Extraordinary Gentlemen
  - Rosemary's Backpack (Drew Gilbert and Antony Johnston)
  - 30 Days of Night (Steve Niles and Ben Templesmith)
  - The Ultimates vol. one
  - The Dark Knight Strikes Again
  - Catwoman: Selina's Big Score
  - Fables: Legends In Exile
  - The Redeemer (Pat Mills, Debbie Gallagher, Wayne Reynolds)
  - After the Snooter (Eddie Campbell)

==== Best Newspaper Strip / Best Online Strip ====
- 1997: Calvin & Hobbes
- 1998: Calvin & Hobbes
- 1999: Calvin & Hobbes
- 2002: The Atrocity
  - Bobbins
  - Marshal Law
  - Super Idol
  - Dilbert
  - Sluggy Freelance
  - Nowhere Girl
  - Bullpen Bits (Marvel)
  - Squidbitz
  - Astounding Space Thrills
- 2003 (sponsored by Bulletproof Comics): Fred the Clown (Roger Langridge)
  - Oddcases
  - Nowhere Girl
  - Red Meat
  - Bash Street Kids Capers
  - Juniper Crescent
  - PvP
  - Astounding Space Thrills
  - Death Takes a Holiday
  - Miffy (Borderline)

==== Best Comic-based Multimedia ====
- 1997: Spawn figures, produced by Todd Toys

==== Best Comic-based Film/TV ====
- 1997: The Adventures of Lois & Clark
- 1998: Men in Black
- 1999: Blade
- 2001: X-Men, directed by Bryan Singer (20th Century Fox)
- 2002: Ghost World
  - X-Men
  - Smallville
  - Spider-Man
  - Blade II
  - Dennis The Menace
  - From Hell
  - Batman (animated)
  - Justice League (animation)
  - X-Men: Evolution
- 2003 (Sponsored by SFX magazine): Spider-Man
  - Daredevil
  - X2
  - Smallville
  - Road to Perdition
  - Blade II
  - Justice League
  - American Splendor
  - Birds of Prey
  - Dan Dare: Pilot of the Future

==== Best Specialist Comics Publication / Best Specialist Magazine or Website ====
- 1997: Comics International
- 1998: Tripwire
- 1999: Comics International
- 2001: Comics International magazine (and website) published by Dez Skinn
- 2002: Borderline
  - 2000adonline.com
  - Comics International
  - Beanotown
  - Wizard
  - Komixworld
  - Comic Book Resources
  - Ninth Art
  - DC Comics.com
  - Tripwire
- 2003 (sponsored by Diamond Previews): Comics International
  - 2000adonline.com
  - Borderline
  - Ninth Art
  - Tripwire
  - Black Library
  - Beanotown
  - Newsarama
  - Silver Bullet Comics
  - Sequential Tart

=== Character awards ===
==== Best Character ====
- 1997: Batman (DC Comics)
- 1998: Batman (DC)
- 1999 (tie):
- Batman
- Judge Dredd
- 2001: Judge Dredd, Created by John Wagner & Carlos Ezquerra, published in 2000 AD
- 2002: Judge Dredd (2000 AD)
  - Dennis the Menace
  - Batman
  - Spider-Man
  - Spider Jerusalem (Transmetropolitan)
  - Nikolai Dante
  - Roger The Dodger
  - John Constantine (Hellblazer)
  - Daredevil
  - Superman
- 2003: Judge Dredd
  - Blinky (The Dandy)
  - John Constantine
  - Batman
  - Kal Jerico
  - Nikolai Dante
  - Spider-Man
  - Wolverine
  - Desperate Dan
  - Sláine

==== Best Supporting Character ====
- 1997: Cassidy (Preacher)
- 1998: Cassidy (Preacher)
- 1999: Judge Galen DeMarco
- 2001: Natt The Hat, from Hitman comic by John McCrea and Garth Ennis
- 2002: Gnasher
  - Wulf Sternhammer
  - Barbara Gordon/Oracle (Birds of Prey, Batman)
  - Alfred (Batman)
  - Cassidy (Preacher)
  - Lex Luthor (Superman, Batman)
  - Nightwing (Nightwing, Batman)
  - Sinister Dexter
  - Deena Pilgrim (Powers)
  - Doop (X-Force)
- 2003: Big Yellow Dog (from Blinky, in The Dandy, by Nick Brennan)
  - Gnasher
  - Ukko the Dwarf
  - Wulf Sternhammer
  - Scabbs (Kal Jerico)
  - Judge Hershey
  - Chesters Aliens
  - Jekyll/Hyde (The League of Extraordinary Gentlemen)
  - Joe Pineapples
  - Beryl the Peril's Dad

==== Most Missed Character, Strip, or Comic ====
- 1997: Dan Dare
- 1998: Dan Dare
- 1999: Johnny Alpha (Strontium Dog)

=== All-time awards ===
==== Best Comics Writer Ever ====
- 2001: Alan Moore, for Watchmen, Swamp Thing (DC Comics), V for Vendetta, Miracleman (Quality Communications), Halo Jones (2000 AD)
- 2002: Alan Moore
  - John Wagner
  - Stan Lee
  - Neil Gaiman
  - Grant Morrison
  - Frank Miller
  - Alan Grant
  - Pat Mills
  - Anonymous (The Beano)
  - Garth Ennis
- 2003 (sponsored by Red Route Distribution): Alan Moore
  - John Wagner
  - Grant Morrison
  - Stan Lee
  - Dan Abnett
  - Neil Gaiman
  - Alan Grant
  - Frank Miller
  - Gordon Rennie
  - Pat Mills

==== Best Comics Artist Ever ====
- 2001: Carlos Ezquerra, for Judge Dredd
- 2002: Jack Kirby
  - Brian Bolland
  - Carlos Ezquerra
  - Mike McMahon
  - Alex Ross
  - Neal Adams
  - Alan Davis
  - Frank Miller
  - Simon Bisley
  - Will Eisner
- 2003 (sponsored by Incognito Comics): Jack Kirby
  - Carlos Ezquerra
  - Brian Bolland
  - Dave Gibbons
  - Colin MacNeil
  - Will Eisner
  - Mike McMahon
  - Simon Bisley
  - Bryan Talbot
  - John Buscema

==== Best British Comic Ever ====
- 1997: The Beano
  - The Eagle
  - Viz Comic
  - 2000 AD

==== Best Comic in the World Ever ====
- 1998: The Eagle

==== Best Comic of the 20th Century ====
- 1999: The Eagle

==== Roll of Honor/Lifetime Achievement ====
- 1997: Dez Skinn
- 1998: Archie Goodwin
- 1999: Bob Kane
- 2002: Alan Moore
  - John Wagner
  - The Beano
  - Stan Lee
  - Frank Miller
  - Phil Hall
  - Mike McMahon
  - Pat Mills
  - Alan Grant
  - Will Eisner
- 2003: John Wagner
  - Stan Lee
  - Alan Moore
  - Will Eisner
  - Pat Mills
  - Rich Johnston
  - Carlos Ezquerra
  - Frank Miller
  - John Buscema
  - Alan Grant

== See also ==
- Eagle Award
- Ally Sloper Award
