= Salient Minus Ten =

2017 short science-fiction film

- Directed by: Emma Dark
- Written by: Emma Dark
- Starring: Alan Austen; Emma Dark; Chris Hampshire; Beric Read; Samantha Oci
- Cinematography: Philip Bloom
- Edited by: Emma Dark
- Music by: Eric Elick
- Release dates: November 2017 (British Horror Film Festival); May 27, 2020 (YouTube)
- Running time: 13 minutes
- Country: United Kingdom
- Language: English

Salient Minus Ten is a 2017 science fiction short film written and directed by Emma Dark.

== Plot ==
The plot of Salient Minus Ten focuses on Adam Harper, who unexpectedly finds himself thrust into a brutal game of life and death.

== Production ==
Salient Minus Ten was funded via the crowdfunding website Indiegogo, where it raised 109% of its goal. Alan Austen, who stopped acting in 2005, was asked by Dark to audition for the lead role in the film after meeting her at the Dale-Con Sci-fi Convention, and later found that he was successful in securing the role. Several shots were filmed at the Barbican Estate in the City of London. Several crew members from Dark's previous film, Seize the Night, returned to work on Salient Minus Ten.

The first trailer was released on August 31, 2017, and the film premiered at the 2017 British Horror Film Festival. It had its Canadian premiere at the Little Terrors Short Film Festival on April 23, 2018.

== Awards ==
Salient Minus Ten won the award for Best Director at the Starburst Fantasy Awards 2018.

== Release ==
The film was released on YouTube on May 27, 2020.
