= Edinburgh Comic Con =

Annual fan convention in Edinburgh, Scotland

- Status: defunct
- Genre: Speculative fiction
- Venue: Edinburgh International Conference Centre
- Location: Edinburgh
- Country: United Kingdom
- Inaugurated: 2014
- Organizer: Hero Conventions
- Website: www.heroconventions.com

Edinburgh Comic Con was an annual fan convention organised by Hero Conventions and run at the Edinburgh International Conference Centre in Edinburgh, Scotland since 2014. It features guests from comics, film and television industries, and includes talks, displays and a prize cosplay competition.

In July 2015, the organisers announced an "Artist Searchlight" competition to design the cover for the 2016 programme.

On 14 April 2022 Hero Conventions announced the event would no longer continue.

== Previous guests ==
The following guests from the world of comic books have been present at Edinburgh Comic Con:

- Jim Cheung (Press release via Comic Conventions)
- Gary Erskine
- Leonardo Manco
- Norm Breyfogle
- Declan Shalvey
- Jordie Bellaire
- Mike McKone
- Ivan Brandon
- Tanya Roberts
- Gordon Rennie
- Tom Foster
- Yishan Li
- Dan McDaid
- Simon Furman

The following guests from the world of TV & film have been present at Edinburgh Comic Con:

- Angus MacInnes (Star Wars, Judge Dredd, Space 1999)
- Simon Fisher-Becker (Doctor Who, Harry Potter)
- Jimmy Vee (Doctor Who)
- Spencer Wilding (Guardians of the Galaxy, Doctor Who, Batman Begins, Ghost Rider 2, Game of Thrones)
- Nathalie Cox (Star Wars: The Force Unleashed & The Force unleashed 2)
- Caitlin Blackwood (Doctor Who)
