= Arsenic Lullaby =

Arsenic Lullaby is a sporadically produced, self-published comic book series, written and illustrated by Douglas Paszkiewicz. The writing style combines horror and taboo subjects with humor and satire.

Arsenic Lullaby was translated by Greek publisher, Jemma Press where it was nominated for the Comicdom Award. The illustrated work was also nominated for the 2009, Eisner Award for Best Humor Publication, as well as, the Harvey Award.

There have been five spin-off series written: Laughter of the Damned (3 issues), Misery A Go Go (1 issue), Arsenic Lullabies (2 issues), The Thousand Deaths of Baron Von Donut (1 issue), and Arsenic Lullaby Pulp Edition, in magazine-sized format.

A 2014, Kickstarter campaign raised money for a collection; it was eventually fulfilled in 2018.

Arsenic Lullaby also had a story animated in Comedy Central's, TripTank.

== Characters ==
- Voodoo Joe– a man "cursed" to help ordinary people obtain revenge.
- The Clot– a man who was diagnosed with a deadly skin bacteria, that leaves him with no skin remaining on his body.
- Baron Von Donut– an immortal, alcoholic mascot, whose magical powers bring him back to life to give donuts to children; regardless of what may have happened to him the previous day.
- The Great Duranti– a stage magician who has sold his soul to Satan, in order to become the most powerful magician on earth. He uses the powers for petty gifting schemes to fund his vaudeville show.
- Old Man Hutchenson– a government clerk, who is kept alive against his will in a cybernetic suit, charged with the duty of remembering top-secret information deemed too precious to risk loading into a computer.
    - A dozen, Zombie fetuses, that Voodoo Joe liberated from an abortion clinic dumpster.
