= Phil Hall (author) =

- Born: Phillip Hall; April 19, 1962 age 63 Stevenage, England
- Areas: Writer, editor, publisher
- Notable works: Comics International news editor Borderline editor/publisher Borderline Press publisher
- Awards: Best Specialist Magazine or Website National Comics Award (2002)

Phil Hall (born April 1962) is a British pop culture writer, editor, and publisher. He was a long-time editor and columnist for the British comics magazine Comics International, as well as the creator and editor of the comics magazine Borderline, He ran his own publisher, Borderline Press, from 2013 to 2015. In addition, he has worked for DC Comics, Marvel UK, and a number of small independent publishers in both the UK and US.

From its inception in 1990, Hall was the copy, news, and features editor at Comics International and created a number of iconic comics magazine columns, such as "Movers & Shakers", "Hotshots", and "Networks," for the magazine.

He left CI in the spring of 2001 and in August 2001 launched the online journal Borderline. Borderline was a cross between The Comics Journal and the NME with a heavy mix of mainstream American/British and international comic books. The magazine spotlighted comic books and creators from countries such as Brazil, Poland, and the Philippines, alongside American and British comic book icons; Borderline was, in part, responsible for a number of previously unknown cartoonists obtaining professional contracts. In the spring of 2002, Borderline became part of the Cool Beans World network of websites. Despite winning the "Best Specialist Magazine or Website" award at the 2002 National Comics Awards, however, Borderline ceased publishing in 2003.

Hall left comics in 2003 to pursue a career in social work, but later returned to write a column for the comics website Comics Village. His book: My Monthly Curse — A Personal Comic Book History, mostly focusing on his time at Comics International and Borderline (culled from entries in his blog, A Life in Comics), was published in digital form in August 2011.

In July 2013, Hall launched Borderline Press Ltd., a registered company dealing with the publishing of new European comics talent. The press had distribution issues, however, which were alleviated when Hall reached a deal with Fanfare in 2015. But continued scheduling issues forced Borderline Press to go on hiatus in May 2015. Borderline Press was sold to Fanfare in August 2016.

Hall currently lives in Wigtown, Dumfries and Galloway, Scotland. He moved there in July 2017

== Borderline Press titles (selected) ==
- 566 Frames by Dennis Wojda (Nov. 2013, ISBN 978-0-9926972-0-4) — autobiographical graphic novel
- Zombre (Nov. 2013, ISBN 978-0-9926972-2-8) — anthology featuring a number of UK, US, and European comics creators
- Hunger House by J. M. Edenborg and Loka Kanarp (2014, ISBN 978-0-9926972-4-2)
- Zombies Can't Swim by Kim Herbst (2014, ISBN 978-0-9926972-6-6)
- Verity Fair by Terry Wiley (2014, ISBN 978-0-9926972-8-0)
- City of Crocodiles by Knut Larsson (Apr. 2014, ISBN 978-0-9926972-5-9)
- Spoko by Tomas Prokupek, et al. (Aug. 2014, ISBN 978-0-9926972-7-3) — anthology
- Seth & Ghost by Jamie Lewis (Mar. 2015, ISBN 978-0992697297)
