= Dez Skinn =

British comic/magazine editor and author

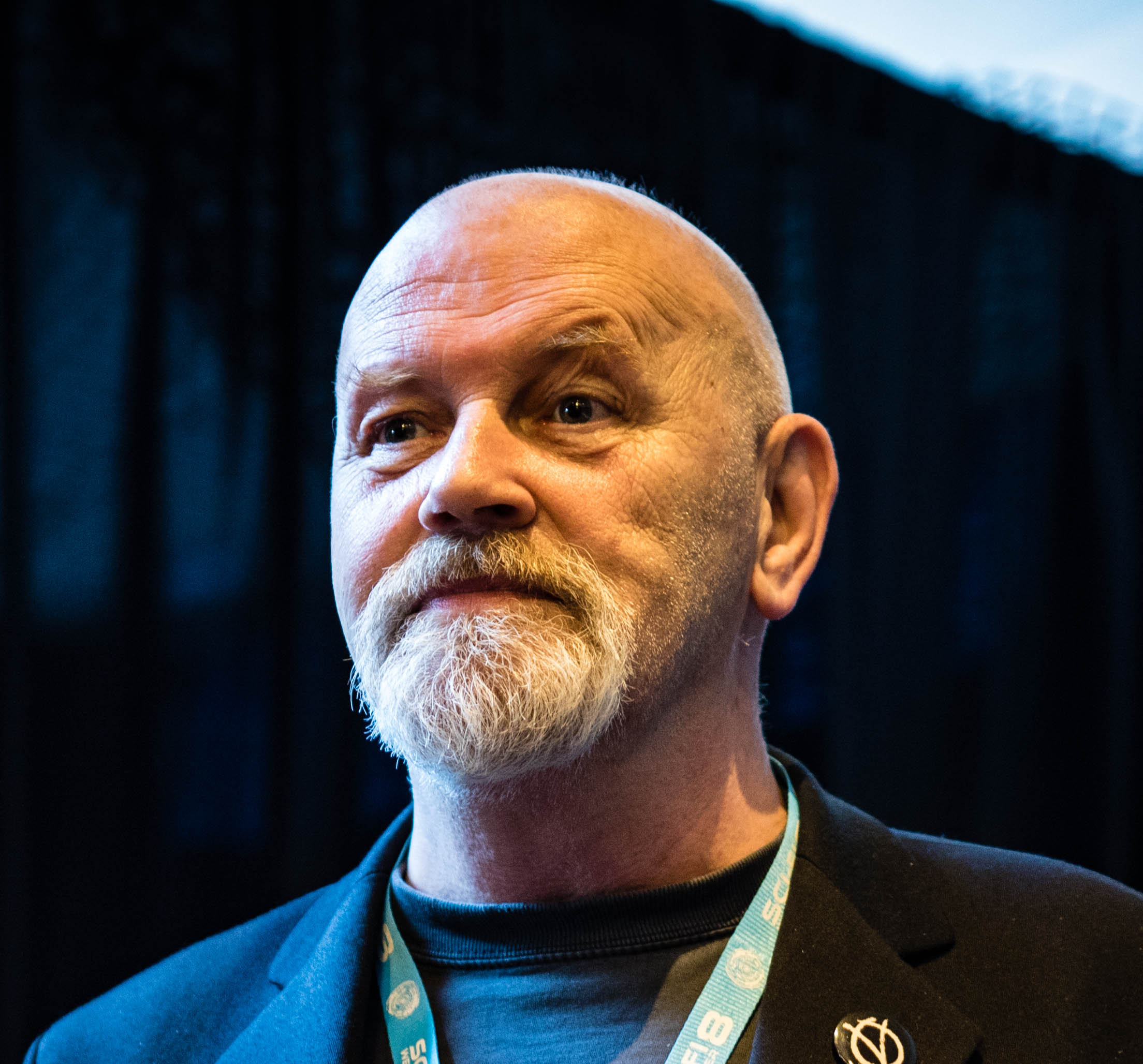
- Skinn in 2017
- Born: Derek G. Skinn; 4 February 1951 (age 75) Yorkshire, England, UK
- Areas: Writer, Editor, Publisher
- Notable works: Marvel UK; Warrior; Comics International
- Awards: Eagle Awards, 1977, 1978, 1983, 1985; Society of Strip Illustration, 1982; National Comics Awards, 1997, 1999, 2001, 2003

Derek Graham "Dez" Skinn (born 4 February 1951) is a British comic and magazine editor, and author of a number of books on comics. As head of Marvel Comics' operations in England in the late 1970s, Skinn reformatted existing titles, launched new ones, and acquired the BBC license for Doctor Who Weekly. After leaving Marvel UK, Skinn founded and edited Warrior, which featured key works by Alan Moore.

Called by some the "British Stan Lee," Skinn is one of British comics' most influential figures. He has caused controversy in his career, specifically related to legal issues regarding his publishing new adventures of the 1950s character Marvelman, as well as charges of plagiarism about Skinn's 2004 book Comix: The Underground Revolution.

== Fandom ==
Skinn first came to prominence in the world of British comics fandom. As a teenager he contributed articles to the seminal fanzine Fantasy Advertiser, published by Frank Dobson (known as the "Godfather of British Fandom"). When Dobson left for Australia in 1970, he handed the zine on to two contributors, Skinn and Paul McCartney, to continue. As editors, Skinn and McCartney expanded the magazine to include more articles and artwork. (Skinn stayed on at Fantasy Advertiser even after starting his professional career at IPC Magazines; finally leaving the fanzine in 1976.)

In 1971, Skinn and Derek "Bram" Stokes produced Comicon '71 (the British Comic Art Convention) at the Waverley Hotel in London; the guest of honor was Frank Bellamy and other guests include Frank Dickens, Mick Farren, and Edward Barker. Skinn returned in 1981 to produce the final incarnation of Comicon, co-organized with Frank Dobson. He also produced the 2005 Brighton Comic Expo.

== Career ==
=== IPC ===
Skinn's professional career started at IPC Magazines (now known as IPC Media) in 1970, where he was sub-editor on Whizzer and Chips, Cor!!, and Buster. He was promoted to be an editor on the Buster Book of Spooky Stories in 1975 and 1976. While at IPC, he also served as Father of the chapel of the local branch of the National Union of Journalists.

=== Warner Bros. ===
Skinn left IPC in 1976 to expand the comics arm of Warner Communications' publishing arm, Williams Publishing. He took over editing MAD UK, Tarzan, Korak, and Larry Harmon's Laurel & Hardy, revived Monster Mag, and launched House of Hammer. Two of Skinn's publications were given Eagle Awards in 1977 — House of Hammer for "Favourite Specialist Comics Publication — Pro" and Mad UK for "Favourite Black & White Comicbook — Humour."

=== Starburst ===
During the summer of 1977, thanks to his interest in (and connections with) the film industry, Skinn became aware of the huge success of the film Star Wars, which would not arrive in British cinemas for nearly six months. Believing this was an opportunity to launch a science fiction magazine, he first suggested the project to his then-employer, Williams Magazines; after they rejected the notion, he decided to publish Starburst, under Skinn's own Starburst Publishing Ltd. Sporting the tagline "Science Fantasy in Television, Cinema and Comix," Starburst contained news, interviews, features, and reviews of science fiction material in various media (including TV, film, soundtracks, multimedia, comics and "collectibles"). Starburst won the 1978 Eagle Award for Favourite British Pro Comics Publication. He was able to publish three bimonthly issues – the first in January 1978, as Star Wars reached British cinema screens – before he was forced to spend the editorial and production budget for the fourth edition in order to ensure the rights to Hammer House of Horror.

=== Marvel UK ===
In August 1978, thanks in part to the success of Starburst, Skinn was hired by Stan Lee to reshape Marvel's floundering British reprint division. (With issue #4, Marvel also bought and began to publish Starburst.) In his 15 months as editorial director for Marvel UK, Skinn reported directly to Lee; he reformatted the existing titles Mighty World of Marvel (which became Marvel Comic), Star Wars Weekly, and Super Spider-Man (which became Spider-Man Comic), plus the monthlies Rampage and Savage Sword of Conan. In addition, Skinn launched first Hulk Comic and then Doctor Who Weekly as well as many other titles — Frantic Magazine, Marvel Pocket Books, Star Heroes, TV Heroes, summer specials, winter specials, etc.

In 2010 Skinn received a Guinness World Records certificate and credit for creating the world's longest-lasting TV tie-in magazine for Doctor Who Weekly.

=== Quality Communications Limited ===
Leaving Marvel in 1980 for his own company, the London West End Studio System, Skinn worked primarily in advertising design for both the film and fashion industry. Looking for more editorial control, in 1982 he returned to publishing with his own company, Quality Communications Limited, where Skinn founded and edited the comics anthology Warrior. Warrior went on to win 17 Eagle Awards, introduce V for Vendetta, and revive Marvelman/Miracleman.

During this period, Skinn also operated Quality Comics, "South London's top fantasy shop," located at 3 Lewisham Way, opposite Goldsmith College.

In 1990, Quality Communications launched the comics trade magazine Comics International, which Skinn published and edited for the following 16 years. His "Sez Dez" column was a regular feature in issues #100–#200, at which point Skinn sold the magazine in 2006 to Cosmic Publications. Quality Communications Limited was officially dissolved on 10 August 2010.

=== Columnist ===
Skinn wrote a column called "The Skinny" for Future plc's comics trade magazine Comic Heroes. Because of his strong beliefs in education through entertainment and the increasing world levels in illiteracy, he began working with the Abu Dhabi Music and Arts Foundation, initially chairing a discussion there on comics and literacy in the Middle East. This led to his becoming curator of the Middle East Film and Comic Con, which debuted in 2012.

== Controversy ==
=== Marvelman (a.k.a. Miracleman) ===
Before launching Warrior, Skinn contacted writer Alan Moore, telling him that "Marvelman's copyright had belonged to the publisher L. Miller & Son, ... that they had gone bankrupt in 1963[,] and that the rights to Marvelman had passed to the Official Receiver [and therefore] could be purchased for a very small amount..."; and asked Moore if he "would ... like to ... contribute to this new retelling of Marvelman."

A quarter-century later Moore found out that Marvelman creator "Mick Anglo had always owned the copyright, that it had never been owned by L. Miller & Son, and that they had not gone bankrupt, but had concluded their affairs quietly in 1963 .... Basically, Mick Anglo had been robbed of his ownership of [Marvelman]." According to Moore, "I was not on the best of terms with Dez Skinn by the end of the Warrior experience. I didn't trust the man, and my opinion – for what that is worth – is that there was knowing deceit involved in the Marvelman decision."

But according to Skinn, he had met with Anglo three times before assigning creators to Marvelman and Anglo had expressed no problem with the relaunch then or for the following 20+ years. Skinn cites quotes by Mick Anglo from George Khoury's 2001 book Kimota!: The Miracleman Companion, "[Regarding ownership] I don't know; that was Miller's sort of thing ... Dez contacted me and he wanted to revive it and I said go ahead and do what you like."

After Warrior magazine folded due to poor sales, Skinn signed a deal with independent American publisher Eclipse Comics to reprint the Marvelman stories (under the title Miracleman) before continuing the storyline with new material by Moore and later Neil Gaiman. According to an editorial by then-Eclipse editor Cat Yronwode in Miracleman #24:

... The contract called for [Eclipse] to pay [Skinn] reprint royalties [which he was to then] forward to each individual [creator]. When [Eclipse] learned that Dez had not sent any royalty money to the creators, [they] cut him out of the loop and paid later reprint royalties directly [to the creators].... During the same period, Skinn also represented himself as the art agent of Mick Austin (painter of MM covers) and sold transparencies to [Eclipse] of Austin's work. ... Eventually [Eclipse] found out – from the artist – that Dez was not Mick's agent, had no authority to offer his pieces to [Eclipse], [and] had not forwarded the money [to Austin]. [So Eclipse paid] Mick the sum total of what he was owed, recovering [its losses] from Skinn by withholding payment on the last projects [they] had going with him.

For Kimota!: The Miracleman Companion George Khoury interviewed both Skinn and Yronwode — separately — and asked each about the claims published in Miracleman No. 24. Skinn claimed to Khoury that "[a]bout ten years after that Miracleman No. 24 letters page," he and Yronwode had a "conversation via e-mail about that outrageous stuff." According to Skinn, Yronwode informed him that "Dean [Mullaney, Eclipse Comics co-founder,] had filled her head with those stories" and apologised to him. But when Khoury relayed this to Yronwode during his interview with her she denied it, maintaining that the "conversation with Dez Skinn about that" never happened and that she never apologised.

=== Comix: The Underground Revolution ===
In 2004 Collins & Brown published Skinn's book Comix: The Underground Revolution. Skinn's authorship of the book was contested by Patrick Rosenkranz and Trina Robbins. Rosenkranz alleged that "Skinn's book extensively "borrowed" from [his own book] Rebel Visions: The Underground Comix Revolution 1963–1975" by using as its title "the same four words, cleverly rearranged, [used] as the subtitle of [his] book," "helping himself to quotes from many interviews [he] conducted, repeating facts and figures that [he] dug up," and "reprint[ing] seven of [his] photographs without permission." Skinn responded by insisting that "No theft was intended". Skinn claims that those seven photographs had been implemented by one of the ghost writers subcontracted by him and when he found out about it, he apologised to and paid Rosenkranz. Skinn claims also that the book title was chosen by the commissioning publisher.

Robbins noted that she wrote Chapter 6, "Girls on Top?" for Comix: The Underground Revolution but was not given credit. "... Dez e-mailed me with a request to contribute a chapter on women in the underground ... I did get paid for it ... one usually expects to be credited for what one writes". Skinn claims that he informed Robbins that no sub-contractors were credited in any of the publisher's titles, and that as the chapter was primarily about her, any such credit would have completely undermined its purported objectivity.

== Awards ==
=== Eagle Award ===
He has won a number of Eagle Awards:

- 1977: "Favourite Specialist Comics Publication — Pro", for House of Hammer (editor)
- 1978: "Favourite British Pro Comics Publication", for Starburst Magazine (editor)
- 1983
  - "Favorite New Comic — UK", for Warrior
  - "Favorite Comic — UK", for Warrior
- 1985: "Best UK Title", for Warrior

=== National Comics Awards ===
The Eagle Awards were replaced during the period 1997–2003 by the National Comics Awards:

- 1997:
  - "Role of Honour"
  - "Best Specialist Magazine or Website", for Comics International
- 1999: "Best Specialist Magazine or Website", for Comics International
- 2001: "Best Specialist Magazine or Website", for Comics International
- 2003: "Best Specialist Magazine or Website", for Comics International

=== Society of Strip Illustration ===
- 1982: "The Frank Bellamy Award for Lifetime Achievement"

== Bibliography ==
- — (2004). Comix: The Underground Revolution. Collins & Brown/Thunder's Mouth. ISBN 1-84340-186-X.
- — (2008). Comic Art Now: The Very Best in Contemporary Comic Art and Illustration. ILEX/HarperCollins. ISBN 1-905814-25-9.

== Notes ==
Preceded by None	Doctor Who Magazine Editor; 1979–1980	Succeeded by Paul Neary
