= Comic Expo =

UK comic book convention

- Status: Defunct
- Genre: Comics
- Venue: British Empire & Commonwealth Exhibition Hall/Ramada Plaza Hotel (2005–2008); Ramada City Inn/Mercure Holland House Hotel (2009–2011); Passenger Shed of Brunel Old Station (2012–2014)
- Location: Bristol
- Country: United Kingdom
- Inaugurated: November 2004
- Most recent: May 2014
- Attendance: 4,000 (2008)
- Organizer: Mike Allwood
- Filing status: for-profit
- Website: www.fantasyevents.org/bristolcomicexpo

The Bristol International Comic & Small Press Expo, commonly known as Comic Expo or BCE, was an annual comic book convention held in the United Kingdom from 2004 to 2013. The show was held once a year in Bristol in the spring. The organiser was Mike Allwood, formerly of Area 51, a comic shop based in Bristol.

The convention featured floorspace for exhibitors, including comic book dealers and collectibles merchants. Along with panels, seminars, and workshops with comic book professionals, one of the highlights of Comic Expo was the Orang Utan Comics film night, which was a staple of the show since 2007. The charity event "Draw the World Together" was an annual part of the show. BCE included a separate "Small Press Expo," an autograph area, as well as a so-called "Artists' Alley" where comics artists signed autographs and sold or offered free sketches. Publishers such as Rebellion Publishing, Panini Comics, Markosia, Reed Full Circle, and SelfMadeHero often had presences as well.

From 2004 to 2008, Comic Expo was the host of the Eagle Awards.

== History ==
BCE replaced a previous Bristol-based UK convention, the Comic Festival; retailer Mike Allwood had been involved with managing Comic Festival as well. (Comic Festival itself had been preceded as an annual UK comic book convention by the United Kingdom Comic Art Convention).

The first Comic Expo was held in Bristol on 6–7 November 2004, at the Ramada City Inn. (A so-called "Pro-Con" was held in the same space on 5 November.) Guests included Simon Furman, Mike Carey, and Mike Collins. This was very much a trial run by all concerned. Although not very well attended, it established how future events in Bristol would work.

The next BCE, held in May 2005, was a success, with guests such as J. Michael Straczynski, Michael Avon Oeming, Gary Frank, Dave Gibbons, Alan Davis, Brian Bolland, Mike Ploog and Simon Bisley; as well as over 2,000 attendees. The Just 1 Page charity comic was produced at Comic Expo 2005 and again in 2006 (continuing on from its origins at Comic Festival).

The November 2005 Brighton Comic Expo was held at the prestigious Metropole Hilton, the largest conference hotel in South England. Guests included Mark Millar, Gilbert Shelton, Dave Gibbons, Sydney Jordan, and Harry Harrison. This was again successful and, with the exception of a few minor criticisms, proved immensely popular with those attending.

Comic Expo Bristol 2006 was a success, with early figures suggesting around 2,000 attendees, as well as the presentation of the Eagle Awards.

The 2008 show was the best attended one so far, with more than 4,000 ticket buyers. The Eagle Awards ceremony was held on Saturday, May 10, presented by comedian Fraser Ayres.

The Great Recession hit the 2009 show hard, as only 650 fans attended. The 2012 show attracted only 300 attendees, with many exhibitors reporting losses. Because of this, there was speculation the show might not survive, but attendance increased for the 2013 show. Nonetheless, the final BCE was held in 2014.

=== Locations and dates ===
Dates	Venue	Attendance	Official guests	Notes
6–7 Nov 2004	Ramada City Inn		Simon Furman, Mike Carey, and Mike Collins	Eagle Awards presented at CBE for the first time.
14–15 May 2005	British Empire & Commonwealth Exhibition Hall/Ramada Plaza Hotel	2,000	J. Michael Straczynski, Michael Avon Oeming, Gary Frank, Dave Gibbons, Alan Davis, Brian Bolland, Mike Ploog and Simon Bisley	
19–20 November 2005	Metropole Hilton (Brighton)	2,000	Mark Millar, Gilbert Shelton, Dave Gibbons, Sydney Jordan, and Harry Harrison	Brighton show organized with Dez Skinn
13–14 May 2006	British Empire & Commonwealth Exhibition Hall/Ramada Plaza Hotel	2,000	Roy Thomas (guest of honour); Geoff Johns, Howard Chaykin, David Lloyd, and Liam Sharp	Eagle Awards presentation
12–13 May 2007	British Empire & Commonwealth Exhibition Hall/Ramada Plaza Hotel		Kurt Busiek, Brian K. Vaughan, Jeph Loeb, and Jean-Pierre Dionnet	Eagle Awards presentation, hosted by actor/comedian Norman Lovett
9–11 May 2008	British Empire & Commonwealth Exhibition Hall/Ramada Plaza Hotel	4,000	Jim Shooter, Walt Simonson, Jim Starlin, and Dave Gibbons	Eagle Awards presentation, hosted by comedian Fraser Ayres
9–10 May 2009	Ramada City Inn/Mercure Holland House Hotel	650	Dan DiDio and Bob Wayne	
22–23 May 2010	Ramada City Inn/Mercure Holland House Hotel	1,000	Richard Starkings, Kieron Gillen, Paul Grist, Charlie Adlard, and Ian Churchill	
14–15 May 2011	Ramada City Inn/Mercure Holland House Hotel		Martin Asbury, Paul Grist, Dave Gibbons, John Higgins, Rick Veitch, and Richard Starkings	
12–13 May 2012	Passenger Shed of Brunel Old Station	300	Dennis O'Neil (guest of honor; but unable to attend); Paul Cornell, Ian Churchill, and Mark Buckingham	
11–12 May 2013	Passenger Shed of Brunel Old Station	2,500	Ian Churchill, Ian Gibson, Boo Cook, Mark Buckingham, Ben Oliver, and Lee Garbett	
10–11 May 2014	Passenger Shed of Brunel Old Station		James O'Barr, Arthur Suydam, Michael Golden	
