= Dark They Were and Golden Eyed (bookshop) =

Former bookshop in London, England

Coordinates: 51°30′51.3″N 0°8′3.7″W

- Type: Private
- Industry: Geek culture, popular culture
- Genre: Retail
- Founded: London, United Kingdom, c. 1969
- Founder: Derek "Bram'" Stokes
- Fate: Out of business (1981)
- Headquarters: Bedfordbury, then 10 Berwick Street, Soho, then St Anne's Court off Wardour Street, Soho, London, United Kingdom
- Number of locations: 1
- Area served: London
- Key people: Diane Stokes (née Lister)
- Services: Comics, books, collectables

Dark They Were and Golden Eyed was a science fiction bookshop and comic book retailer in London during the 1970s; it was the largest of its kind in Europe. Specialising in science fiction, occultism, and Atlantis, the central London shop also played a key role in bringing American underground comics to the United Kingdom. It also sold American editions of mainstream science fiction books that were not easily obtained anywhere else.

The shop was named after the short story by Ray Bradbury.

== History ==
The shop was started by Derek "Bram" Stokes, who had previously been a member of the editorial collective of the fanzine Gothique, but had left after issue 4 to start a science fiction mail order book service. Diane Lister (later Diane Stokes) joined Stokes in 1969. The shop was managed by fantasy author Stan Nicholls, who had worked with Stokes on Gothique. The shop was originally located in Bedfordbury before moving to 10 Berwick Street in Soho.

Dave Gibbons, a trained architect, designed the staircase to the basement at the Berwick Street location (which historically had been a butcher shop) — he was paid in comics. Frank Dobson, dubbed the "Godfather of British Fandom," a trained electrician, helped wire the new store — and was also paid in comics.

Nick Landau, later to be a founder of Forbidden Planet and Titan Entertainment Group, was also a customer, and produced a fanzine on the shop's hand-cranked duplicator. Stokes and Landau were important forces behind the annual British Comic Art Convention, the so-called "UK Comicon," which ran, mostly in London, from 1968 to 1981. Stokes was the main organizer of the 1969 and 1971 editions, and Landau was a key organizer of the 1972 and 1973 editions of Comicon.

The shop was also the semi-official correspondence address for the magazine Fortean Times from 1978 to 1981, and the magazine's team met every Tuesday afternoon in a room above the shop. (The shop was advertised in #28 of Fortean Times; the advert was drawn by Bryan Talbot who went on to draw for 2000 AD.)

Comics artist Brian Bolland drew some of the earliest pieces of advertising artwork for Dark They Were and Golden Eyed, which ran in various fanzines, convention programmes, and magazines such as Time Out, and were commissioned by future-Titan Distributors and Forbidden Planet co-founder (with Nick Landau) Mike Lake, who was "working there at the time" in c. 1978. Illustrator and author James Cawthorn also produced adverts for the shop in 1977; they appeared in Time Out and other magazines. His illustrations were also featured on paper carrier bags used by the shop. (Cawthorn's graphic novels were published by David Britton's Savoy Press in Manchester.) Later adverts were created by Rod Vass, who designed and illustrated posters and carrier bags for the shop.

The shop later moved to a much larger ground floor and basement premises in St Anne's Court off Wardour Street in Soho, at that point proclaiming itself "the biggest and best science fiction, fantasy, and comic book store in the world." At round this time, the store was also partnering with the Essex-based wholesaler Biytoo Books/Dangerous Visions.

Dark They Were and Golden Eyed closed in 1981. Visitors to the store following closure could see a message in the window telling them that Dark They Were and Golden Eyed may have gone, but the spirit lived on...

== Legacy ==
Paul Hudson, later of the London comic shop Comic Showcase, was employed in Dark They Were and Golden Eyed. Illustrator and designer Floyd Hughes worked at the shop in the late 1970s. The shop was a key influence on three bookshops in Manchester run by David Britton and Michael Butterworth: House on the Borderland, Orbit in Shudehill, and Bookchain in Peter Street.

== In popular culture ==
Notable customers of the shop included Alan Moore. The second issue of Moore and Kevin O'Neill's The League of Extraordinary Gentlemen, volume 3 ("Century: 1969") features a homage to Dark They Were and Golden Eyed: a comics/science fiction/Forteana store named after another Bradbury short story "There Will Come Soft Rains". In his introduction to Shelf Life: Fantastic Stories Celebrating Bookstores, Neil Gaiman writes of the shop's influence on him as a teen; the introduction is reprinted in his book The View from the Cheap Seats: Selected Nonfiction.

The photo on the cover of the U.K. Subs' single "Tomorrow's Girls" (released 31 August 1979) features the shop front in St Anne's Court.
