= Vivian Cheung =

British entrepreneur

- Occupations: Retailer, editor, publisher
- Notable work: Titan Entertainment Group; Forbidden Planet
- Spouse: Nick Landau

Vivian Cheung is a British entertainment entrepreneur. A fantasy and pop culture expert, with her business partner and husband Nick Landau, Cheung is the co-owner of the Titan Entertainment Group, which comprises the Forbidden Planet Limited store chain and Titan Publishing Group.

== Career ==
Cheung set up the Titan Entertainment Group in 1993 with Nick Landau. The group now includes the Forbidden Planet mega stores (including the flagship London store), Titan Books, Titan Comics, and Titan Merchandise.
