= Said the actress to the bishop =

Informal exclamation of ambiguity used after double entendres

The phrase "said the actress to the bishop" is a colloquial British exclamation, offering humour by serving as a punch line that exposes an unintended double entendre. An equivalent phrase in North America is "that's what she said". The versatility of such phrases, and their popularity, lead some to consider them clichéd.

== History and variations ==
The term, or its variant "as the actress said to the bishop", is British in origin. It supposedly originated from a conversation between the actress Lillie Langtry and the Bishop of Worcester. They were at a country house weekend party and on Sunday morning before church, they went for a stroll in the garden. On their walk, the bishop cut his finger on a rose thorn. Over lunch, Lillie enquired about his injury, asking: "How is your prick?" To which the bishop replied: "Throbbing," causing the butler to drop the potatoes.

The supposed association of actors with amorality and the incongruity of what a cleric and actor could legitimately have in common to discuss explains its ribald connotation. The phrase was in popular usage in the Royal Air Force c. 1944–47, but may originate from the Edwardian era.

The phrase is frequently used by the fictional character Simon Templar (alias "The Saint") in a long-running series of mystery books by Leslie Charteris. The phrase first appears in full in the second Saint novel Enter the Saint, published in 1930; abbreviations of both the phrase ("as the actress said on an auspicious occasion") and of the alternative version ("as the bishop said") appear in the 1928 Meet the Tiger.

The version "as the girl said to the soldier" appears in a recorded sound test for Alfred Hitchcock's 1929 film Blackmail.

Kingsley Amis uses the line in his 1954 novel Lucky Jim, where a woman offering relationship advice to Jim Dixon says "I can't show you, as the actress said to the bishop."

The title character on the US TV show Archer, after several seasons of using "phrasing!" to draw attention to double entendres, briefly toyed with "...said Ripley to the android Bishop", a reference to both this phrase and the 1986 film Aliens.

British comic artist Brian Bolland has produced a comic inspired by the joke, The Actress and the Bishop.

== "That's what she said!" ==
By 1973, "that's what she said" had already been characterised as an "ancient one-liner". In the early 1990s, it was a recurring joke in the Saturday Night Live sketch "Wayne's World". In the movie of the same name, the character, Wayne Campbell, uses the phrase after his friend Garth says, "Hey, are you through yet? 'Cause I'm getting tired of holding this", in regard to a picture he is holding.

In the original BBC version of The Office, Ricky Gervais's character David Brent frequently used the phrase "as the actress said to the bishop" as an inappropriate joke. When the show was adapted for American audiences, also under the title The Office, the phrase was translated to "that's what she said" for Steve Carell's character Michael Scott. "That's what she said" (with an emphasis on the word "she") became a catchphrase of The Office and was used for the show's "That's What She Said" Sweepstakes. On several occasions, the phrase was adapted to "that’s what he said".
