= Queen Victoria & The Holy Grail =

Tabletop role-playing game supplement

Cover art by Kevin Hopgood, 1985

Queen Victoria & The Holy Grail is an adventure published by Games Workshop in 1985 for the superhero role-playing game Golden Heroes.

== Plot summary ==
The player characters are tasked by the ghost of Queen Victoria to recover the Holy Grail, stolen in 1898, from a powerful supervillain. The adventure starts at Buckingham Palace, moves to New York City, and returns to England for the final confrontation.

== Publication history ==
In 1984, Games Workshop published Legacy of EAGLEs, the first of a planned series of short "Monthly Modules" for their Golden Heroes superhero role-playing game. However, the second adventure, Queen Victoria & The Holy Grail, proved to be the last in the series. It was written by Marcus L. Rowland, with artwork by Tony Ackland, and Fox, with cover art by Kevin Hopgood, and was published in 1985 by Games Workshop as a 32-page book with character cards, and cardstock miniatures.

== Reception ==
In the January 1986 edition of White Dwarf (Issue #73), Pete Tamlyn warned his readers that "This scenario is Tough, this scenario is Weird, but it is such a marvellous idea that it is well and truly worth all of the trouble." He noted that, being one of the shorter Monthly Modules, "it doesn't contain quite the same quantity and quality of play aids." Tamlyn criticized the combat as too lethal, and questioned why a map of Buckingham Palace was included, saying "what idiot is going to start a fight in Buckingham Palace?" However, he concluded by giving it an above-average overall rating of 8 out of 10, stating, "love it, love it, and I can't wait for the players in my campaign to get tough enough to handle it."

== Other reviews ==
- Papyrus, Issue 7 (1992)
- Casus Belli Issue 32 (Apr 1986) in French
- Comics Feature #56
