= The Forbidden Planet =

The Forbidden Planet may refer to:

- Forbidden Planet, a 1956 American science fiction film from Metro-Goldwyn-Mayer
- Forbidden Planet (retail store), the trading name of two separate UK-based science fiction, fantasy and horror bookshop chains
- "The Forbidden Planet", the twentieth episode of the British children's science-fiction puppet television series Fireball XL5
