= St Anne's Court =

Alley in the City of Westminster, London, England

Coordinates: 51.5144°N 0.1339°W

St Anne's Court in the early 1960s

St Anne's Court is an alleyway that connects Dean Street and Wardour Street in London's Soho district. Parts of it can be dated back to the late 17th century.

Sites in St Anne's Court included the "model lodgings" designed by William Burges in 1864-66 for the banker and philanthropist Lackland Mackintosh Rate, for whom Burges subsequently work at Milton Court, Dorking, Surrey. At St Anne's, Rate wanted a commercial rental property. The result was a series of thirty lodging rooms to be let to artisans. The building was of brick with cast-iron piers. Crook describes the result as "Burges's favourite 13th-century French, pared to the bone." The building has subsequently been demolished.

The site is also known as the location where the singer-songwriter Marianne Faithfull spent some time as a homeless heroin addict in 1971/72. Other well known sites also include the former Trident Studios and the 1970s science fiction bookshop Dark They Were, and Golden-Eyed. In the 1980s, a basement in St Anne's Court was home to Shades Records, a store specialising in extreme forms of Heavy Metal such as "Death Metal" and "Thrash Metal". As the only such store in the country, it played a particularly important role in the growth of those music genres in the UK.

== See also ==
- Meard Street, a nearby pedestrianized street parallel to St Anne's Court, of similar antiquity
