= Golden Heroes Supervisors Kit =

Cover art by Alan Craddock, 1985

Golden Heroes Supervisors Kit is a supplement published by Games Workshop in 1985 for the super-hero role-playing game Golden Heroes.

== Contents ==
Golden Heroes Supervisors Kit is designed to help the gamemaster with administrative and preparatory work for a campaign of the superhero role-playing game Golden Heroes, and includes

- a cardstock gamemaster's screen
- an A4 pad of 30 blank character sheets, 10 combat sheets and 10 campaign record sheets
- 21 file cards describing supervillains
- 24 full-colour cardboard stand-up characters of supervillains and thugs.

== Publication history ==
Golden Heroes Supervisors Kit, published by Games Workshop in 1985, was written by Simon Burley and Pete Haines, and used the same cover art by Alan Craddock that had appeared the previous year on the Golden Heroes Supervisors Book.

== Reception ==
Pete Tamlyn reviewed Golden Heroes Supervisors Kit for White Dwarf #75, giving it an overall rating of 8 out of 10, and stated that "The real item of value in the pack [...] must be the cardboard figures. [...] You get 24 figures in the pack for less than a fifth of the cost of equivalent metal figures. And they are exactly the figures that you want."

== Reviews ==
- Casus Belli #32 (Apr 1986)
