= Titan Distributors =

- Company type: Comic book distribution, Comic marts, Book publishing
- Industry: Comics
- Predecessor: Comic Media Distribution Service
- Founded: 1978; 48 years ago
- Fate: Acquired by Diamond Comic Distributors, 1993
- Headquarters: London, United Kingdom
- Key people: Nick Landau, Mike Lake, Mike Luckman
- Products: Books, trade paperbacks
- Divisions: Forbidden Planet bookstore Westminster Comic Mart; Titan Books

Titan Distributors was a British comic book distributor which existed from 1978 to 1993, when it was acquired by a larger U.S. distributor. Operated by Nick Landau, Mike Lake, and Mike Luckman, Titan Distributors supplied comics, science fiction, and other genre products to retailers all over the United Kingdom. Titan also operated the retailer Forbidden Planet, produced the bimonthly Westminster Comic Marts, and operated Titan Books.

== History ==
=== Origins: Comic Media Distribution Service ===
In 1973, when only a small range of US comic books were available in British news agents, Nick Landau established Comic Media Distribution Service (CMDS), which imported American comics from the "big two" publishers DC and Marvel.

=== Formation of Titan Distributors / Forbidden Planet ===
In 1978, Landau partnered with Lake and Luckman and re-formed CMDS as Titan Distributors. In addition to their distribution business, the partners also immediately founded a retail location, the Forbidden Planet bookshop, a small store on Denmark Street in London. As the scope of the store expanded beyond comics to embrace film and television, a second store was opened just around the corner on St Giles High Street. The store's success led to overcrowding, necessitating a move to much larger premises on New Oxford Street.

=== Westminster Comic Mart ===
In late November 1979, Titan began operating the London Comic Mart (a venture started by Landau and his former partner, Rob Barrow, in 1972), staging shows roughly on a bimonthly basis at Central Hall Westminster. The Westminster Comic Mart, as it became known, was the center of the London comics scene for much of the 1980s; the British Comic Art Convention disappeared after the 1981 show, and the United Kingdom Comic Art Convention didn't start up until 1985, so there were no actual comic book conventions being held in London during this time. Publisher/editor Paul Gravett began his career managing the Fast Fiction table at the Westminster Comic Marts. Gravett invited artists to send him their homemade comics, which he would sell from the Fast Fiction table, with all proceeds going to the creator. The 1983 Westminster Comic Mart was the host convention for the Eagle Awards, which were presented by Alan Moore and Dave Gibbons.

=== Titan Books ===
In 1981, Titan Distributors set up the publishing company Titan Books, whose first title was the trade paperback collection of Brian Bolland's Judge Dredd stories from 2000 AD. This was one of the earliest high-quality, book-format publications of comic material in the UK, and Titan Books followed the first title with numerous other 2000 A.D. reprints. Titan Books expanded operations in 1987, putting out its first original title — Pat Mills and Hunt Emerson's You Are Maggie Thatcher — and also taking over publishing Escape magazine.

=== Dissolution and sale ===
In 1992, Landau, Luckman, and Lake dissolved their partnership and traded their company shares: Landau became sole owner of Titan Books and Forbidden Planet London; Luckman became sole owner of Forbidden Planet's New York stores, and Lake became sole owner of Titan Distributors. Lake almost immediately sold Titan to the U.S.-based Diamond Comic Distributors, which added its clients and warehouses to the Diamond UK operations. He then opened Forbidden Planet locations in Scotland and northern England (an operation later named Forbidden Planet International).

== See also ==
- Neptune Distribution
- Titan Entertainment Group
