= The Actress and the Bishop =

British comic strip

- The Actress (left) and the Bishop on the cover of Shift Presents... The Actress and the Bishop. Art by Brian Bolland.
- Created by: Brian Bolland

Publication information
- Schedule: Irregular
- Title(s): A1 #1 & 3 Bolland Strips! Shift Vol. 2 #5
- Genre: Black comedy
- Publication date: October 1989
- Main character(s): The Actress; The Bishop

Creative team
- Writer(s): Brian Bolland
- Artist(s): Brian Bolland

The Actress and the Bishop is a creator-owned British comic story, written and drawn by Brian Bolland. It tells the whimsical misadventures of an actress and a bishop living together in suburban England. The characters have made rare appearances in various anthologies; as of 2025 four stories of varying lengths have been produced between 1989 and 2022. The strip features only occasional dialogue; instead, most text is told in rhyming narrative captions.

== Creation ==
Inspired by the British innuendo "Said the actress to the bishop", Bolland first drew the characters for a French Editions Déesse portfolio in 1985. Some time later, he was approached by Garry Leach and Dave Elliott to contribute to the first issue of Atomeka Press' anthology series A1. At the time, Bolland was finding himself uninterested in regular comic work, instead wanting to work on his own ideas. He particularly enjoyed the opportunity The Actress and the Bishop gave him to make seemingly mundane things - such as a garden shed - seem interesting. Despite the potentially salacious nature of the set-up - the original one-liner had played on the association of actresses with vice compared to the moral standing of bishops, who are among the highest ranking clergy within the Church of England - Bolland felt "the least interesting thing to do with them was turn them into porn". Instead, the pair were located in an unnamed English suburb and attempt various normal activities, which nevertheless attract weirdness.

== Publishing history ==
The first story, "The Actress and the Bishop Go Boating", was included in A1 #1 in 1989, with a second - "The Actress and the Bishop Throw a Party" - appearing in the third issue. A third story, the feature-length "The Actress and the Bishop and the Thing in the Shed", was included in the 2005 Knockabout Comics compilation Bolland Strips!, along with other short stories by Bolland. In 2009, the three stories were published in a direct market The Actress and the Bishop one-shot by Desperado Publishing.

In 2022 a fourth story was produced for the anthology Shift, "The Actress and the Bishop Go to the Seaside". It was published in colour on Shift Volume 2 #5, and in black-and-white alongside the previous stories in the one-shot Shift Presents... Brian Bolland's The Actress and the Bishop.

== Premise ==
The Actress and the Bishop share a house at 22 Rayner's Lane in a quiet corner of English suburbia. Despite their titles, neither seems to have any sort of occupation, instead pottering around the home reading, watching television, and juggling knives. Generally, the Actress handles domestic chores while the Bishop does the gardening. The pair share a bed, though their relationship status - like most of their lives - is a mystery. A monster may or may not have lived in their shed for a time.

== Characters ==
The Actress is dark-haired, pale-skinned, beautiful and inappropriately dressed for any situation. She wears a revealing black evening dress complete with elbow-length gloves and heels for lounging around the house or domestic chores, occasionally switching up to a fetishistic Britannia-style headdress and basque. Bolland described the character as having "a chequered past". She may not be an actress; The Bishop invites her into his home after discovering a card advertising her services next to a public phone in Crewe, having interpreted their description as a sign of divine contact. She is suggested to be highly skilled in languages, speaking Portuguese and mastering Ancient Greek in less than a week.

The Bishop is always dressed in full episcopal regalia - mitre, cope, pectoral cross, surplice and crosier - with the notable exception of anything covering his legs bar a pair of fluffy slippers. In the twilight of his life, the Bishop awaits some sort of contact from God, such as a phone call. He joined the clergy because he found the stories in the Bible exciting, rather than out of faith. His mind often wanders to his past. As a young man in Bradford, he fell in love with a lady called Ethel White, only to be heartbroken when she instead has a child with one Henry Pugh. The Bishop seems unaware that he accidentally killed Pugh soon afterwards with a chair he threw out of a window, while Ethel ends up also living in Rayner's Lane, something unknown to him until the Actress suggests throwing a party to meet the neighbours.

== Reception ==
Rich Johnston of Bleeding Cool was effusive about the Desperado one-shot, calling it "beautiful, sexy, funny, intricate, astoundingly well written and structured, and an example of the creator at the top of his game", and praising how much was packed into the short stories.
