= Golden Heroes =

1984 superhero role-playing game

- Games Workshop 1984 edition, cover art by Alan Craddock
- Designers: Simon Burley, Peter Haines
- Publishers: Games Workshop
- Publication: 1982 (amateur); 1984 (Games Workshop)
- Genres: Superhero fiction
- Systems: Custom

Golden Heroes is a British superhero role-playing game that was originally written and published on an amateur basis in 1981, and then republished in a more complete and professional form by Games Workshop in 1984.

== Description ==
Golden Heroes is a superhero game not affiliated with any line of comic books (unlike Marvel Super Heroes, for example, which is based on the superheroes found in Marvel Comics.) Because of this, a player has to create their superhero from scratch, not based on a pre-existing superhero.

The first step in character generation is to randomly determine via dice rolls the character's basic attributes of Ego, Strength, Dexterity and Vigor. The dice rolls also determine the character's superpowers. There is an opportunity for the player to modify abilities somewhat, but not to change the superpowers. A character can only keep their full set of powers if they can justify them all in a plausible origins story.

During play, the player must keep track of the superhero's private life, what happens during leisure time and the work done while using the hero's secret identity. Characters are "rated" after each game and are more likely to succeed in future games if they behave in ways consistent with Comic Book tropes.

Original mimeographed and self-published edition, 1981

== Publication history ==
Golden Heroes was developed at University of Birmingham by Simon Burley and Peter Haines in 1981, who self-published their manuscript as a 60-page mimeographed book. Burley and Haines shopped the book to Games Workshop, who expanded the material to include Marvel characters in the hopes of acquiring a role-playing game license from Marvel Comics. When Marvel awarded the license to TSR instead, Games Workshop expunged the Marvel content and published the result as Golden Heroes in 1984. The box cover art by Alan Craddock is meant look like the cover of an American comic book of the time, complete with a fake bar code and a fake Comics Code Authority approval badge. Interior art was by a plethora of British artists, including Brian Bolland, Kevin Bulmer, Mike Collins, Declan Considine, Alan Davis, Kirk Etienne, Brett Ewins, Jon Glentoran, David Hine, Gary Mayes, and Brendan McCarthy, several of whom were working for the British comic book 2000 AD at the time.

The following year, Games Workshop published two adventures and one supplement for Golden Heroes:

- Legacy of Eagles
- Queen Victoria & The Holy Grail
- Golden Heroes Supervisors Kit

Games Workshop also published content for the game in their house magazine White Dwarf, and produced a line of metal miniatures.

Twenty years after Games Workshop let the Golden Heroes line of products lapse, one of the original creators, Simon Burley, resurrected the game as Squadron UK in 2006.

== Reception ==
Writing in Issue 62 of White Dwarf (February 1985), Marcus L. Rowland noted "As a late contender in the super RPG field, Golden Heroes faces severe opposition from established games. However, its quality, scope, and the fact that it is orientated towards British players are bound to make it successful, if there is a steady flow of supplements and scenarios." Rowland concluded by giving the game an overall rating of 10 out of 10.

Pete Tamlyn reviewed Golden Heroes for Imagine magazine, and stated that "For younger players, and If you just want the Superhero game for light relief and one-off scenarios, then [Marvel Superheroes] is the best, but if you are planning to run an extended Superhero campaign then Golden Heroes wins hands down."

Quentin Long reviewed Golden Heroes for Different Worlds magazine and stated that "I don't like it. The good bits (as few as they are) are not enough to make up for all the bad bits. Buy it only if you're a rabid completist or if you enjoy tinkering with rules from obscure games."

In his 1990 book The Complete Guide to Role-Playing Games, game critic Rick Swan was disappointed in the game, particularly the character generation system, pointing out "basically [the player] is saddled with whatever powers the dice-rolls dictate, no matter how contradictory or silly. Because the random ability system freely mixes useless powers with god-like, there's only a remote chance that players will receive [player characters] of comparable talents." Swan was likewise dismayed by the combat system, calling it "a hodge-podge of weapon classes, target ranges and power grades bordering on the incomprehensible." Swan also didn't like the extensive paperwork required to track a hero's private life. Swan concluded by giving the game a below average rating of 2 out of 4, saying, "The rulebooks boast some nice artwork, and the thoughtful referee's tips are applicable to any comic-book RPG, but there's just not enough substance in Golden Heroes to recommend it over the competition." However, Swan found the two adventures released for Golden Heroes to be "surprisingly good, particularly Queen Victoria & The Holy Grail, an exciting adventure with supernatural overtones."

More than ten years after its publication, Tony Johnston did a retrospective review of Golden Heroes for the British games magazine Arcane, calling it "A superb system, and one which some referees I know still use today, adapted for other games." That same year, Arcane held a reader poll to determine the fifty most popular role-playing games and Golden Heroes was ranked 41st. Editor Paul Pettengale commented: "The gameplay reflects a refined approach to the superhero genre, and roleplaying tends to take priority over combat."

== Other reviews and commentary ==
- The V.I.P. of Gaming Magazine #3 (April/May, 1986)
- Comics Feature #35
