= Nick Landau =

British entrepreneur

- Born: United Kingdom
- Areas: Retailer, editor, publisher
- Notable works: Forbidden Planet Limited; Titan Entertainment Group
- Spouse: Vivian Cheung

Nick Landau is a British entertainment entrepreneur. He co-owns Titan Entertainment, with his partner Vivian Cheung, which comprises the Forbidden Planet Limited store chain and Titan Publishing Group.

A lifelong science-fiction, comics and movie fan, Landau’s career has spanned retail, publishing, distribution, theatre production, web TV production and convention organising.

== Origins ==
Landau’s first involvement in comics fandom was in 1968 when he attended the very first British Comic Art Convention (known as Comicon), held in Birmingham.

== Career ==
=== Comic Media ===
In 1971, Landau established Comic Media magazine, in order to interview comic-book creators and bring news and features to a nascent British comics fandom.

Landau was joined the following year by Richard Burton, with whom he built a group of magazines, including Comic Media News (later taken over solely by Burton) and Comic Catalogue (a “buy and sell” magazine for the comics industry).

=== Conventions, Comic Mart and Eagle Awards ===
In August 1972, Landau organised Comicon '72, the fifth ever British Comic Art Convention. Later that year, Landau created the London Comic Mart, a one-day event held at Lyndhurst Hall that attracted around 250 attendees, which later expanded into significantly larger events at the Royal Horticultural Hall and Central Hall Westminster and ran through to 1978. In 1977, Richard Burton and retailer Mike Conroy set up the Eagle Awards, with Landau coming on board shortly after, prior to Conroy’s departure. Burton and Landau grew the Eagle Awards into an international comics industry event supported by the world’s major comics publishers. Landau continued to be involved with the Awards into the late 1980s.

=== Film and television societies ===
From fall 1972 to summer 1975, Landau attended Warwick University to study for a degree in Management Science. Whilst there he founded the Warwick University Television Society, and built their Film Society into one of the largest student-run organisations in the country, which ultimately won “film society of the year” in the UK.

From fall 1975 to spring 1977, Landau studied for a postgraduate qualification in film and television production at the West Surrey College of Art and Design, with the intention of forging a career in television. In addition to producing television drama and documentaries during this year, Landau directed Six Inch Nails and Baling String, a documentary about a UK circus in decline.

=== Comics distribution ===
In the early 1970s Landau started trading his magazine Comic Media with US retailers. This evolved into a US fanzine importation service operating under the name Comic Media Distribution Service. On a trip to the US, an opportunity arose to expand this service into importing US newsstand comics into the UK.

At this time, a Brooklyn teacher named Phil Seuling took the first steps towards creating the “direct market” by setting up a direct sales service for US comic book retailers, creating a direct sales service between them and Marvel and DC. Landau was a vocal supporter of Seuling’s initiative and Comic Media Distribution Service became Seuling’s first international customer.

After first being assisted by Richard Burton and then Mal Burns, Landau was joined by Mike Lake and Mike Luckman at Comic Media Distribution Service. Landau and his partners came to feel that the company had grown out of its original name and re-branded their operation with Landau’s choice of company identity: Titan Distributors.

=== IPC Magazines and 2000 AD ===
In the spring of 1977, Landau changed focus to join the editorial staff of IPC Magazines. The opportunity came from an interview he conducted for Comic Media News at the offices of the still-new science fiction comic 2000 AD with editor Pat Mills. Mills was planning on resigning once 2000 AD had become established, and following the interview, had decided that Landau would make a suitable chief sub-editor, saying:

Nick was clearly an exceptional person and I knew he would be of great value, but [IPC publisher John] Sanders rightly regarded most comic fans with deep suspicion, irrelevant to a mainstream undertaking. I agreed with the feeling and still do. Nick was the exception to an otherwise golden rule.

When Landau arrived at IPC Magazines, he found himself assigned to their controversial weekly comic Action. When Mills stepped down at 2000 AD after sixteen issues, replaced by Kelvin Gosnell, Landau was brought in as Gosnell's chief sub-editor. Gosnell was overwhelmed by the amount of work needed to launch 2000 AD's new sister title Starlord, and Landau took up the slack. As Gosnell describes it, "As soon as Starlord came on the scene, I lost it. I had to have someone running 2000 AD and that was Nick Landau. He was halfway between editor and chief sub," and Roy Preston was made a sub-editor to take up the slack and help Landau. With the focus on the launch of Starlord (issue No. 1 was cover-dated 13 May 1978), Landau, Preston, and art editor Kevin O'Neill had more creative freedom. As Mills says, "Some of the best decisions on 2000 AD's future were made while they were running the show. They were responsible for "The Cursed Earth", credit cards and encouraged talented artists like Garry Leach and Brian Bolland."

Gosnell points out, however, that "[t]his wonderful gush of creative freedom they felt when I started on Starlord nearly got 2000 AD taken off the market." They ran into legal problems over fill-in stories for "The Cursed Earth" (which satirised the big food companies, including figures like Ronald McDonald and the Jolly Green Giant) but the main problems came over Inferno, the sequel to Harlem Heroes. Concerns were raised over the violence in the story, but the sequence of events is unclear, as detailed in the 2000 AD history Thrill-Power Overload, "[t]rying to determine exactly what happened next is problematic, due to conflicting memories and the passage of time." The outcome was that, with issue No. 86 (cover-dated 14 October 1978), when Starlord was merged into 2000 AD, Landau was moved into the same role at the war comic magazine Battle (swapping places with Steve MacManus).

While “resting in the trenches of Battle” Landau devised a new British comic-book concept called Heroes, coming out of his experience at 2000 AD and Action. The title was to feature heroes of past, present and future in their own strips, all secretly linked with each other (a fact that would only reveal itself over time) to battle a trans-time corporation.

Although Landau was promised editorship of this title by IPC’s publisher, he was disappointed to find that Kelvin Gosnell was ultimately named editor. Gosnell wanted to take Heroes in a direction influenced by the classic IPC titles of the 50s and 60s (Lion, Valiant), far away from Landau’s original concept (which had been influenced by the harder-hitting and more contemporary Action and 2000 AD). The last straw for Landau was when Gosnell returned from an IPC board meeting where the Heroes name was jettisoned in favour of Tornado. Landau’s reaction was “to ask why the title had been named after a cleaning fluid.” Very shortly after this, in the spring of 1979, Landau resigned from IPC and focused full-time on the world of commerce.

=== Forbidden Planet ===
By 1977, Landau and his distribution partners Lake and Luckman had become increasingly concerned about their key customer’s ability to pay its bills. They decided their recourse was to open up their own retail outlet, named Forbidden Planet and based in London’s Tin Pan Alley, Denmark Street. From summer 1978 to spring 1979, Landau combined his role at IPC with running Forbidden Planet, before focusing full-time on Forbidden Planet.

In 1993, Landau, Luckman and Lake dissolved their partnership and sold Titan Distributors to the U.S.-based Diamond Comic Distributors. Landau became sole owner of Titan Books and the Forbidden Planet mega stores (including the flagship London store); Luckman became sole owner of Forbidden Planet's New York store.

=== Titan Entertainment ===
Landau set up the Titan Entertainment in 1993 with Vivian Cheung, his business partner and wife. The group now includes the Forbidden Planet mega stores (including the flagship London store), Titan Books, Titan Comics and Titan Merchandise.

=== In popular culture ===
- Landau, Luckman, and Lake, a fictional organization appearing in Marvel Comics, is named for the original three founders (including Landau) of Titan Distributors and Forbidden Planet bookstores.
