= Promotional apparel =

Clothing imprinted with a company's branding

Promotional apparel is clothing imprinted with a company's name, logo or message. They include shirts, gloves, hats, jackets and any piece of clothing that can be incorporated in marketing and communication campaigns. Promotional clothing is used to endorse a product, service or company agenda. The importance of promotional apparel lies in the relationship that is generated between businesses and the public. Businesses require promotional items to help reach potential customers and clients. With promotional apparel, businesses are able to obtain exposure and brand recognition. Promotional apparel is usually distributed as handouts or shipped as bonus items to accompany a purchase.

== History ==
The history of promotional products dates back to 1789, the first product being a commemorative button made for George Washington and his campaign. Due to the success of the commemorative button, other items such as wood specialties, almanacs, and calendars slowly became available as promotional items. The next innovation to change the world of promotional merchandise would be that of Jasper Freemont Meek. In 1881, in an attempt to produce revenue for his printing business and to use his printing presses during their downtime, Meek partnered with Cantwell Shoes to print advertisements for the local merchant on the bags of school children. These bags would be distributed to the children and become almost a walking advertisement for Cantwell Shoes. Providing these promotional items not only provided more revenue for Cantwell, but also spawned a full-scale printing operation for Meek, who began printing logos and messages on bags, calendars, and other merchandise for the local merchants of Coshocton, Ohio. Meek is often credited as the father of promotional products. The industry of promotional products has evolved quite a bit to meet the needs of both the producer and seller of the promotional items. Two major organizations play a substantial role within the industry. One organization is the Promotional Products Association International (PPAI), which was founded in 1904 as a method used to address issues such as pricing, new ideas, and procedures. The other organization is the Advertising Specialty Institute, or ASI, which was founded in 1950 by Joseph Segel. Both of these organizations publish content and informational literature for promotional products and their suppliers.

== Products and Uses ==
A large variety of products are available for businesses to use as promotional items.

Promotional apparel may include:

- T-shirts
- Sweatshirts
- Dress shirts
- Polo shirts
- Headwear
- Aprons
- Scarves
- Flip flops
- Outerwear
- Uniforms

While screen printing is a common method due to low costs and ability to produce a large amount, some suppliers provide embroidering. Emerging trends within fashion tend to be influential on promotional apparel and their design. It is crucial for suppliers to follow closely with creative new finishes, materials, and styles that will be popular with customers and clients. It is also important that the items are high-quality in material and design. The reputation of the business is associated with the quality of the product and can affect customer loyalty. Customers that receive high-quality promotional merchandise are more inclined to purchase from the business in the future. According to the 2016 ASI Ad Impression study, 85 percent of the individuals surveyed remembered the name of the company that distributed a promotional item. Consumers were also found to be 2.5 times as likely to hold a positive impression of a company that handed out a promotional product compared to just showing a digital advertisement.

== See also ==
- Promotional merchandise
- Brand management
- Brand awareness
- Consumer behaviour
