= Legacy of EAGLES =

Tabletop role-playing game adventure

Cover art by Brian Bolland, 1984

Legacy of EAGLES is an adventure published by Games Workshop in 1984 for the superhero role-playing game Golden Heroes.

== Plot summary ==
Many years ago, all of the superheroes of the Extraordinary Association of Government Law Enforcers (EAGLES) suddenly went missing except for one, who appeared in the middle of London and went berserk. He has been raving mad since then, and held in an asylum. Now the next generation of superheroes (the players) are called upon to step up when they learn that a team of supervillains plans to kidnap the insane EAGLE as he is transferred to another asylum.

== Publication history ==
Legacy of EAGLES was written by Simon Burley, with a cover by Brian Bolland, and interior art by Kevin Hopgood. It was published in 1984 by Games Workshop as a 24-page book with two color maps, character cards, and cardstock miniatures.

== Reception ==
In the August 1985 edition of White Dwarf (Issue #68), Marcus L. Rowland gave a generally positive review, saying, "I played in this scenario before reading it, and found it very enjoyable. However, the format does seem to emphasise combat rather than detection or role-playing, a common flaw of most superhero scenarios. My other main reservation was the price, which makes Legacy more expensive than some US imports." Rowland concluded by giving it an excellent overall rating of 9 out of 10.

In the September 1985 edition of Imagine (Issue #30), Pete Tamlyn liked that "almost everything you need is provided, including beautifully produced map-sheets, fold-together cardboard figures and quick reference cards for each major villain." Tamlyn also complimented the design of the adventure for helping new groups of players to get going, and thought that "most of the plot is very good, the NPCs are decidely non-cardboard, and the player-characters cannot win on brawn alone." However, Tamlyn didn't like the final encounter, saying that it "is handled poorly, leaving [the players] feeling that they had no party in the victory." He concluded though, that it was "a very encouraging product."

== Reviews ==
- Comics Feature #41
