= Titan Entertainment =

British publishing house

- Type: Retailer; Publisher
- Industry: Retail; Publishing
- Founded: 1993; 33 years ago
- Founders: Nick Landau; Vivian Cheung
- Headquarters: London, England, United Kingdom
- Subsidiaries: Forbidden Planet Limited; Titan Publishing

Titan Entertainment is a British entertainment company. It was founded from Forbidden Planet London in 1993 by Nick Landau and Vivian Cheung. The company comprises Forbidden Planet Limited and Titan Publishing Group, which has four divisions: Titan Books, Titan Comics, Titan Magazines, and Titan Merchandise.

== History ==
Titan Entertainment is the brand name of the group, outside of Forbidden Planet, and a number of different companies and subsidiaries have been established, utilising the Titan name.

=== Titan Distributors ===
In the early 1970s, Landau started trading his magazine Comic Media with US retailers. This evolved into a US fanzine importation service operating under the name Comic Media Distribution Service. On a trip to the US, an opportunity arose to expand this service into importing US newsstand comics into the UK. At this time, a Brooklyn teacher named Phil Seuling took the first steps towards creating the direct market by setting up a direct sales service for US comic book retailers, creating a direct sales service between them and Marvel and DC. Landau was a vocal supporter of Seuling's initiative and Comic Media Distribution Service became Seuling's first international customer. After first being assisted by Richard Burton and then Mal Burns, Landau was joined by Mike Lake and Mike Luckman at Comic Media Distribution Service. Landau and his partners came to feel that the company had grown out of its original name and re-branded their operation with Landau's choice of company identity: Titan Distributors.

=== Forbidden Planet ===
In order to support their distribution business, Landau, Lake, and Luckman opened the first Forbidden Planet bookstore, on Denmark Street in London, in 1978. From 1978 through to 1993, Forbidden Planet grew to be a chain of stores in the UK, in addition to US stores in New York and Los Angeles. The Forbidden Planet chain comprised a number of mega stores in the UK, with the flagship store in London (which, over the years, has become world-renowned to fans of comic-books, movies, television, animation and gaming). As of 2023, Forbidden Planet London store has hosted over 2,000 signings.

=== Titan Books ===
In 1981, Landau started Titan Books, publishers of both new and licensed graphic novels and film and TV tie-ins. Titan Books' first title was a trade paperback collection of Brian Bolland's Judge Dredd stories from 2000 AD. This was one of the earliest high-quality, book-format publications of comic material in the UK and Titan Books followed this first title with many other 2000 AD reprints. Subsequently, Titan Books expanded operations, putting out its first original title in 1987. As of 2023, Titan Books is a global publishing company comprising illustrated and fiction divisions. Titan Books originally focused on film, TV and gaming tie-ins - and now both publishes in these categories and creates a wide range of original horror, science-fiction, fantasy, crime and thrillers.

=== Titan Productions ===
Titan Productions (which produced the West End stage play Thunderbirds: F.A.B. between 1989 and 1993) was originally part of the group, until it was sold to the John Gore Organization.

=== Transformation into Titan Entertainment ===
In 1993, Landau became sole owner of Titan Books and Forbidden Planet (UK), establishing Titan Entertainment with his partner Vivian Cheung.

=== Titan Publishing Group ===
==== Titan Magazines ====
Titan Magazines was the first division launched under Titan Entertainment in 1995, as a UK and later international newsstand publisher of genre titles. Titan Magazines originally published Star Trek Magazine, the Wallace and Gromit comic, UK editions of Simpsons Comics and a slew of licensed TV & film fantasy titles (Buffy the Vampire Slayer, Battlestar Galactica, Star Wars, etc.). Featuring articles written by key entertainment industry figures such as J. J. Abrams and J. Michael Straczynski.

==== Titan Merchandise ====
Titan Merchandise was launched in 2012 and produces licensed merchandise for global properties, including Marvel Comics, Star Wars, Doctor Who, The Beatles, Star Trek, Alien, Breaking Bad, Ghostbusters, and Hammer Horror.

==== Titan Comics ====
Titan Comics was launched in 2012, with the intention of championing creators and original material publishing high quality comics, trade paperbacks and graphic novels across the UK and United States. Film, TV and gaming comics establishing itself as a high quality publisher of licensed properties. As of 2023, their publications include Gun Honey, Heatseeker, Doctor Who, Bloodborne, Blade Runner and Conan the Barbarian.

==== Titan Manga ====
Titan Manga was officially launched in 2023. Titan had already pioneered English language manga publishing throughout the 1990s and 2000s (publishing English-language editions of Akira, Crying Freeman, Ghost in the Shell, etc.). Titan Manga now publishes a variety of world English editions of celebrated Japanese manga, including Atom (the origin of Astro Boy), Kamen Rider Kuuga, Afro Samurai, and Western-originated Americanised manga adaptations such as Cowboy Bebop and Robotech.
