= Brian Bolland =

British comics artist (born 1951)

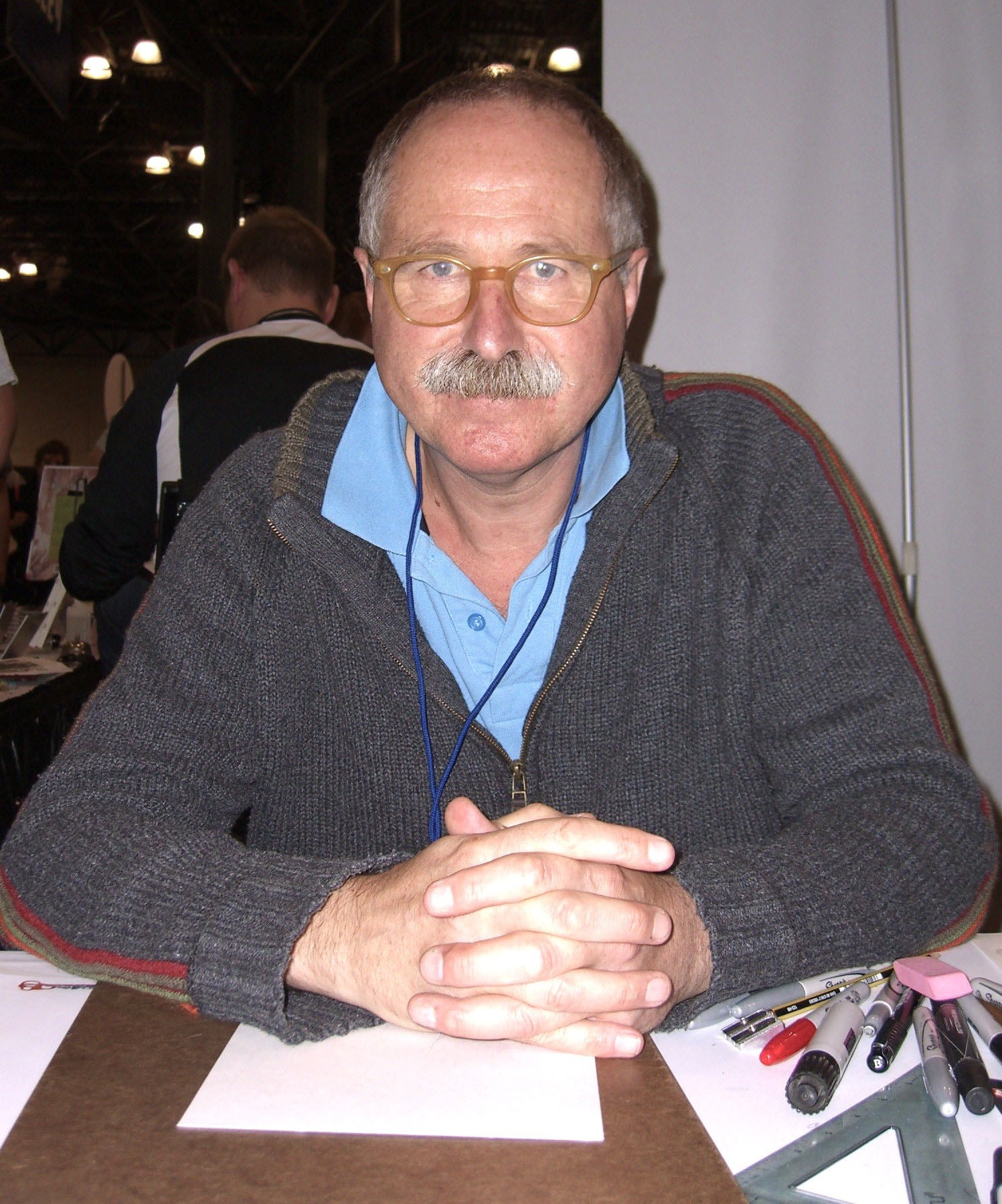
- Bolland at the New York Comic Con in Manhattan, 9 October 2010
- Born: Brian John Bolland; 26 March 1951 (age 75) Butterwick, Lincolnshire, England
- Areas: Writer, Penciller, Inker
- Notable works: Judge Dredd vs. Judge Death; Batman: The Killing Joke; Camelot 3000
- Spouse: Rachel Birkett (1981-present)
- Children: 1

Brian John Bolland (/ˈbɒlənd/; born 26 March 1951) is a British comics artist. Best known in the United Kingdom as one of the Judge Dredd artists for British comics anthology 2000 AD, he spearheaded the 'British Invasion' of the American comics industry, and in 1982 produced the artwork alongside author Mike W. Barr on Camelot 3000, which was DC Comics's first 12-issue comicbook maxiseries created for the direct market.

Bolland illustrated the critically acclaimed 1988 graphic novel Batman: The Killing Joke, an origin story for Batman supervillain the Joker, with writer Alan Moore. He gradually shifted to working primarily as a cover artist, producing the majority of his work for DC Comics. Bolland created cover artwork for the Animal Man, Wonder Woman, and Batman: Gotham Knights superhero comic book series. In 1996, he drew and self-penned a Batman: Black and White story, "An Innocent Guy". For DC's Vertigo imprint, Bolland has done covers for The Invisibles, Jack of Fables, and a number of one-shots and miniseries.

In addition to interior and cover art, Bolland has also produced several comic strips and pin-ups as both writer and artist. His most notable are the semi-autobiographical humour strip Mr. Mamoulian and the whimsical rhyming strip The Actress and the Bishop. All strips of both projects were included in the Bolland Strips! collection book, published in 2005. In 2006, he compiled the art book The Art of Brian Bolland, showcasing all of Bolland's work to date and also his work as a photographer.

== Early life ==
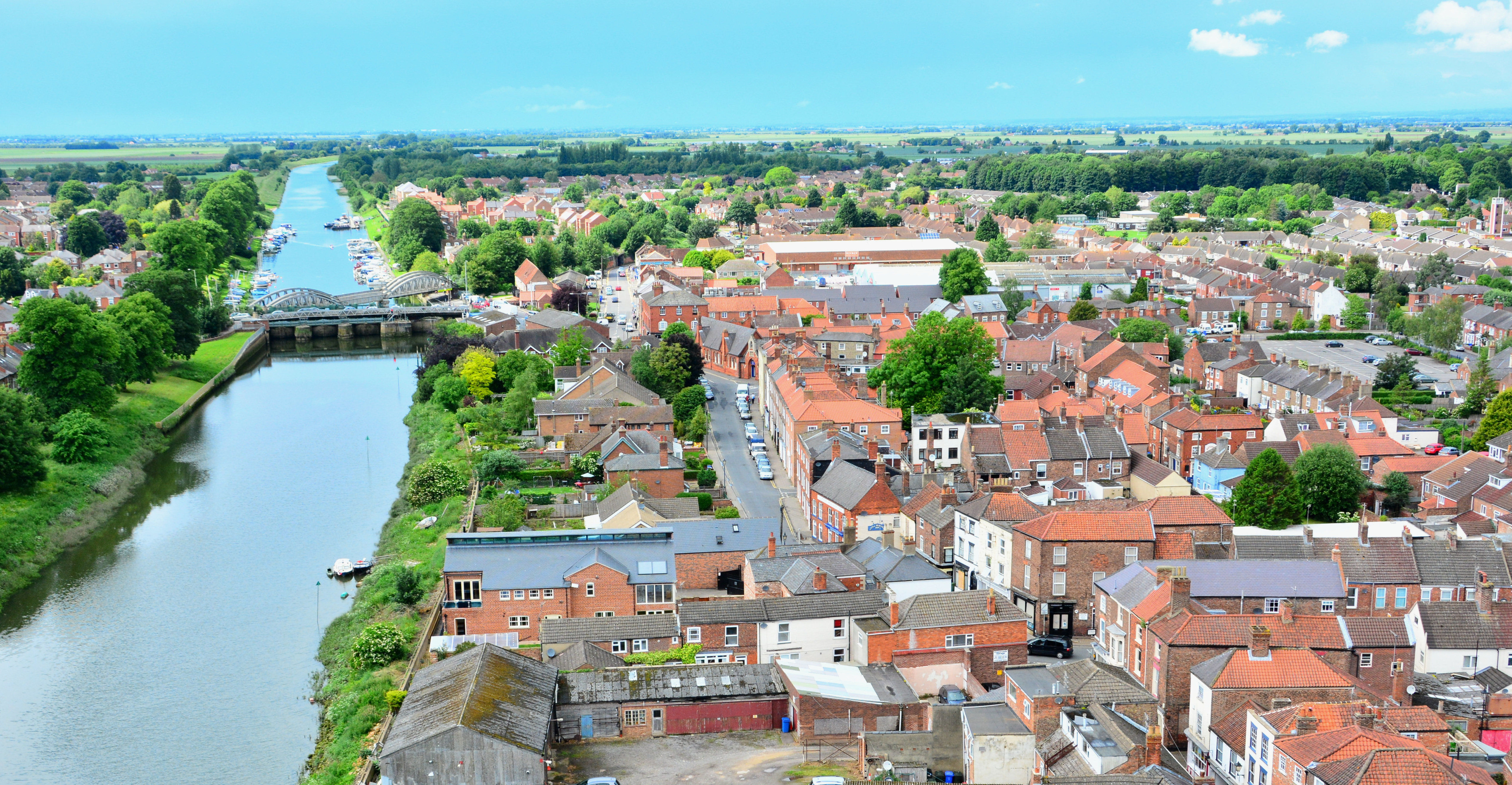
Bolland grew up near Boston, Lincolnshire.

Brian Bolland was born in Butterwick, Lincolnshire, England, to Albert "A.J." John, a fenland farmer, and Lillie Bolland. He grew up in a small village near Boston, Lincolnshire until he was 18 years old. When American comics began to be imported into England, c. 1959, Bolland hadn't read any comics before the age of ten, but by 1960 he was intrigued by Dell Comics' Dinosaurus!, which developed into a childhood interest in dinosaurs of all shapes and sizes. Comics including Turok, Son of Stone and DC Comics' Tomahawk soon followed, and it was this burgeoning comics collection that would help inspire Bolland to draw his own comics around the age of ten with ideas such as "Insect League." He recalls that "[s]uperheroes crept into my life by stealth," as he actively sought out covers featuring "any big creature that looked vaguely dinosaur-like, trampling puny humans." These adolescent criteria led from Dinosaurus! and Turok via House of Mystery to "Batman and Robin [who] were [often] being harassed by big weird things, as were Superman, Aquaman, Wonder Woman [etc]," Bolland recalled. Soon, family outings to Skegness became an excuse for the future artist to "trawl... round some of the more remote backstreet newsagents" for comics to store on an overflowing wooden bookcase he'd built in school.

As early as 1962, aged 11, Bolland remembers thinking that "Carmine Infantino's work on the Flash and Gil Kane's on Green Lantern and the Atom had a sophistication about it that I hadn't [previously] seen." He would later cite Kane and Alex Toth as "pinnacle[s] of excellence," alongside Curt Swan, Murphy Anderson, Sid Greene, Joe Kubert, Ross Andru, Mike Esposito, Nick Cardy, and Bruno Premiani, whose influences showed in his "early crude stabs at drawing comics." The young Bolland did not rate Marvel Comics as highly as DC, feeling the covers cluttered and the paper quality crude. His appreciation of the artwork of Jack Kirby, he says, only materialised much later. He did however enjoy UK comics, including newspaper strips such as Jeff Hawke by Syd Jordan and Carol Day by David Wright, and Valiant which featured Mytek the Mighty by Eric Bradbury and Steel Claw by Jesus Blasco. Despite such a variety of inspirations, Bolland credits his eventual pursuance of art as a hobby and then vocation to a primary school art teacher.

Growing up as an only child with parents that had no interest in art, literature, or music, he embraced the late 1960s pop culture explosion of pirate radio stations, experimental music, recreational drugs, psychedelia, Oz Magazine, "dropping out" and other aspects of hippy culture epitomised by underground comix such as Robert Crumb's Zap Comix. Having taken both O-Level and A-Level examinations in art, Bolland spent five years at art school beginning in 1969, learning graphic design and art history. Learning to draw comics, however, was an art he self-taught, with Bolland eventually writing a 15,000-word dissertation in 1973 on Neal Adams – an "artist [his teachers] had never heard of." He would later recall:

It was during this time that I discovered the sheer range of comics and their history. All the British stuff I'd missed was there to be discovered. I found the American greats, Foster, Herriman, Alex Raymond and Winsor McCay... Noel Sickles, Milt Caniff, Roy Crane, had all, I discovered, put down the basic building blocks of our "Art form". And there were the Europeans... Moebius, Manara, Breccia. Later the Filipinos—Alex Niño, Nestor Redondo, Alfredo Alcala, all were inspirational. None of this stuff was to be found in the art schools. During my five years in three art schools I never learnt a single thing about comics from any of my tutors.

== UK career ==
=== Fanzines and early work ===
Bolland studied graphic design at Norwich University of the Arts. While at art school, Bolland drew and self-published a couple of fanzines and his work was published in British underground magazines Frendz, International Times and OZ. In 1971, his friend Dave Harwood entered printed mass production with his RDH Comix, for which Bolland provided a cover (featuring Norwich Cathedral). Also in 1971, Time Out – an underground magazine rapidly reinventing itself into "the biggest weekly listings magazine in London" – gave Bolland his first compensated work producing an illustration of blues guitarist Buddy Guy. While in Norwich, Bolland produced the first episodes of an adult Little Nemo in Slumberland parody entitled Little Nympho in Slumberland, and when he moved to the Central School of Art and Design in London in 1973, he continued to produce (mostly full-page) Little Nympho strips for a 50-copy fanzine entitled Suddenly at 2-o-clock in the Morning. He also contributed a smaller, strip entitled "The Mixed-Up Kid" to the Central School of Art's Galloping Maggot, the college newspaper.

=== 2000 AD, Judge Death and Walter the Wobot ===
In 1972, Bolland attended the British Comic Art Convention at the Waverley Hotel in London, and met several influential figures in the current British comics scene, including Dez Skinn, Nick Landau, Richard Burton, Angus McKie and – crucially – Dave Gibbons. Bolland and Gibbons became firm friends. After finishing his college course, Bolland was hit with "the stark reality of unemployment" and on the advice of Gibbons joined art agency Bardon Press Features. He soon found work doing a number of two-page strips for D.C. Thomson resulted, but Bolland would refer to this period as his "lowest time." Bardon did however produce a client called Pikin which was "planning a bi-weekly comic about an African superhero," Powerman, which was to be sold in Nigeria. Gibbons and Bolland were to draw alternate issues, with Bolland first drawing Powerman No. 2. Bolland recalls that "soon Dave had drawn his entire story and I had produced just a few pages." This knowledge – "that Dave could produce a page a day... and that I was going to have to do the same" – was a shock, but proved to be "the very best kind of training ground." With comics purportedly being new to Nigeria, Bolland recalls this work being created specifically to be "really simple; six panels on a page and [all] the panels had to be numbered." Not only was this work "[t]he best way to learn the simple rules of comic book storytelling," but "better still, it was going someplace where nobody I knew could see it." He "drew around 300 pages of that very straightforward, simple-to-follow work, and I guess the storytelling flowed naturally from that." Even so, he "was always struggling to get the last eight or ten pages finished," and was occasionally helped by friends, both from his "Norwich School of Art days," Gibbons and future-2000 AD and League of Extraordinary Gentlemen artist Kevin O'Neill.

Bolland writes that starting with Powerman he "found regular employment drawing comics, one of which, Judge Dredd, in 1977–80, turned out to be quite a hit..."

In early 1977, Bardon agent Barry Coker called Gibbons and Bolland to the office and showed them "mock-ups from a new science fiction comic IPC was planning to publish." Gibbons joined Carlos Ezquerra in "jumping into 2000AD feet first with issue 1 (or Programme, later Prog 1)... but meanwhile [Bolland] would have to keep drawing Powerman on [his] own." Powerman dropped to a monthly schedule, and Coker soon got Bolland "a cover on 2000 AD in May '77 with Prog 11" (7 May 1977; signed "Bollo"). Bolland recalls of those early days that:

You'll be surprised to hear that even though Judge Dredd had been in 2000AD since Prog 2 the editors weren't sure which of the interior characters would sell the comic best if that character was on the cover. Artists like me just came up with cover ideas and, if they liked them, we'd draw the cover and they would write a one-page text story based on it to go inside. These early covers of mine fall into that category.

Other covers followed for nearly a third of the first 30 progs, as well as stand-alone pages and some inking duties on Gibbons' Dan Dare. Already familiar with Nick Landau (acting editor), when another artist dropped out, Bolland was called directly to complete a Judge Dredd story in Prog 41 (3 Dec 77) and soon was established as a regular artist on the series. "From that point on," writes Bolland, "either he [Landau] or his successor Steve MacManus called me direct whenever they wanted me to do a Dredd story." Dredd stories started as traditional UK comic stories, i.e. "six-page one-offs... [Writers] Pat Mills and John Wagner seem[ing] to spurn the American comic idea of continuing stories or, worse, the idea of a 2000 AD continuity between characters," Bolland seeing this as a "strength... hav[ing] one great new idea each week." Soon, though, the writers began to craft serials, and Bolland's distinct abilities with subtle facial expressions, dramatic lighting and the dynamic composition of page layout made him the perfect choice to draw the ongoing sagas, starting with "The Lunar Olympics". Bolland contributed artwork to such Judge Dredd story-arcs as "Luna Period", "The Cursed Earth", "The Day the Law Died", "The Judge Child Quest" and "Block Mania". As the Dredd stories rose in popularity, they "were moved so they started on the middle pages" with a colour double-page spread, which Bolland "always struggled with" finding it "very difficult... [trying] to fill that space most effectively." Ultimately the weekly deadlines meant that Bolland was unable to produce all episodes of the epic storylines himself, and the art chores on The Cursed Earth were split between Bolland and Mike McMahon.

Bolland's early work on Judge Dredd was much influenced by McMahon, a talented newcomer whose idiosyncratic style was fuelling the interest in the new character. Bolland thought McMahon was "terrific, the real ideas man on Dredd," but noted that McMahon's approach was "very impressionistic," while the "average comics reader, certainly at the time, does tend to prefer realism." Bolland therefore states that he "aped Mike's genius... and then reinterpreted [Dredd] in a style which actually borrowed a lot from the work of the American artists," retaining McMahon's "granite-jawed" look but bringing a level of realism and fine detail to the character, which Mark Salisbury says "finally cemented the iconic image."

As well as honing the look of the character and contributing to early storylines, Bolland created the look of two of the wider Dredd universe's prominent characters: Judge Death (and the other three Dark Judges) and Judge Anderson.

Later, Landau's Titan "decided they could repackage the Judge Dredd stories in an American comic format with new covers and sell it to America," and did under the brand "Eagle Comics". Bolland provided many of the covers for these compendium issues.

Bolland "drew the first three episodes of the Judge Death story over the winter of 1979–80," as "just another villain in just another excellent John Wagner script." He does not "remember doing any sketches to get him right," the "outfit was described somewhat in the script... and details of it were heavily inspired by the look of Kevin O'Neill's Nemesis the Warlock. Bolland was, he acknowledges, "by far the slowest of the rotating Judge Death artists," opting to "take as long as I needed and do a half-way decent job" rather than rushing. For the sequel, a "massive (for me) 30 pages," 2000 AD's editorial banked one-off stories to give Bolland long enough to draw it all.

When Nick Landau began (in 1981) Titan Books' reprints of Judge Dredd material, he "used this story non-chronologically" to begin the series. Landau spent time paginating the book at Bolland's flat, and discovered that "[s]ome stories started or ended on the wrong page thereby leaving blank pages," as it was set to be "in effect, the first book exclusively of my work" the artist "gladly offered to add three full page pictures for the Cursed Earth volume and a new back cover for the first Judge Dredd volume.

Walter the Wobot was an android with a speech impediment who served as Judge Dredd's personal servant robot. Created for comedic relief, Bolland notes that "[t]he great thing about the Judge Dredd strip was it's [sic] ability to slide seamlessly between gritty sci fi adventure, nasty gothic horror, spoofery, all the way to daft comedy." Walter's solo adventures – "Walter the Wobot, Fwiend of Dwedd" – were the latter style. Bolland drew all bar a couple of Walter's adventures, which appeared between Progs #50–61; #67–68 and #84–85 (with Ian Gibson drawing the first two episodes and Brendan McCarthy the last two), and says that he "was usually able to complete one in a day." He namechecks "the great Don Martin" as an artist he "shamelessly ripped off" for the human supporting characters, drawing most of the pages in Chiswick, 1978.

=== Other UK work ===
In between Dredd assignments Bolland drew horror strips for Dez Skinn's House of Hammer, having been introduced to the comic through another of the "fanboy in-crowd," Trevor Goring, who drew "a comic strip version of the movie Plague of the Zombies," and asked Bolland to ink it. Soon, Bolland was asked to draw "Vampire Circus" (dir. Robert Young, 1972; comic version scripted by Steve Parkhouse), and "pile[d] on the gore" for his first Hammer horror adaptation – although he found much of the "blood painted out" in the printed version.

Cover art of Legacy of EAGLES (1984). Art by Bolland.

From the 1970s to the present, Bolland has also produced one-off pieces of artwork for use as record (including one for The Drifters in 1975), paperback book (including the UK Titan editions of George R. R. Martin's Wild Cards anthologies) and magazine covers (including Time Out and every major comics publication). He continued to produce work for fanzines, including for Nick Landau's Comic Media News, and Arkensword and even "drew the hazard cards" for a board game called Maneater. He later "got to know the Games Workshop guys, Steve Jackson and Ian Livingstone," and produced various "games related drawings" including a cover or two for Fighting Fantasy Adventure Game Books, and RPG scenario pamphlets. His cover work for Games Workshop includes the role-playing game Golden Heroes and its only adventure Legacy of Eagles, and the Fighting Fantasy book Appointment with F.E.A.R.

In 1977, Bolland was approached by Syd Jordan to ghost some episodes of Jordan's newspaper strip Jeff Hawke, after fellow fandom-pro artist Paul Neary had already done a fair number of them. Bolland drew 13 episodes, and "Syd touched up some of the faces, a few details here and there, to make them look a bit more like him." By this point, "although the Express owned the rights to the strip, they were not printing it," but since it had a strong European following, these new episodes (Bolland believes) "got collected in anthologies in French and Spanish," but not in the UK except briefly in "the fanzine Eureka." In 1985, as a known fan, Bolland was approached by Nick Landau to select stories and draw covers for two Titan collections of the strip, with a third design going unpublished. Bolland also contributed "A Miracle of Elisha" to Knockabout Comics' Old Bailey OZ Trial Special, written because Old Testament history had piqued the interest of Bolland when living near the British Museum. This page was later reprinted in the Outrageous Tales From the Old Testament volume, which included works from Moore, Hunt Emerson, Gaiman, Gibbons, and Dave McKean, although Bolland's name was left off the cover.

Bolland produced a considerable amount of advertising work, initially because his agent "Barry Coker kept putting advertising jobs my way," including a number of ads for "Palitoy's Star Wars toys." He also drew some of the earliest pieces of advertising artwork for the science fiction and comic shop Dark They Were, and Golden-Eyed, which ran in various fanzines, convention programmes, and magazines such as Time Out and was commissioned by future-Titan Distribution and Forbidden Planet co-founder Mike Lake (who was "working there at the time") c. 1976. As well as the DTWAGE adverts, Bolland and most of his peers also contributed artwork to advertise, and/or feature in programme booklets for the UK Comicon, starting c. 1976. In 1978, Nick Landau, Mike Lake and Mike Luckman "took their comic distribution business into the highstreet," opening the first Forbidden Planet comics shop, for which Lake asked Bolland to produce the now-famous "People like us shop at... FORBIDDEN PLANET" adverts. Bolland's artwork would also feature on the shop's plastic bags, as well as T-Shirts and "covers for their SF, comic and TV & film catalogues," among other places. Later, when a branch of Forbidden Planet was opened in New York, and at a second location in London, Bolland "did ads for both of them."

== DC Comics ==
Bolland was among the first British comics creators to work in the American comics industry, spearheading the so-called "British Invasion" in 1979/80. Bolland recalls that his big break came when Joe Staton attended the Summer 1979 Comicon, and, needing somewhere to work on Green Lantern while in the UK, arranged to stay with the Bollands. Staton called his editor Jack Harris and told him that Bolland, a big Green Lantern fan, would like to draw a Green Lantern cover; Harris agreed. He drew several covers for DC Comics, starting with Green Lantern No. 127 (April 1980), as well as some fill-in stories. These stories included, in 1980-1981, "Certified Safe" in Mystery in Space and "Falling Down to Heaven" in Madame Xanadu, DC's first attempt at marketing comics specifically to the "direct market" of fans and collectors. For editor Julius Schwartz, Bolland drew covers around which writers would craft stories, which included two Starro covers for Justice League of America No. 189 and 190 and Superman No. 422 (Aug. 1986).

Among his earliest interior work for DC was a chapter in Justice League of America No. 200 (March 1982) alongside Joe Kubert, Carmine Infantino, Gil Kane, Jim Aparo, George Pérez, and Dick Giordano. This gave the artist his "first stab at drawing Batman." Bolland felt that "after my cover [GL #127] worked out the people at DC turned their gaze on London... and particularly on the group of artists at 2000AD who had been weaned on the DC characters." He recalled that, "after I was settled in at DC, scouts from that company came to our "Society of Strip Illustration" meetings to win over a few more of us," making a "formal invitation" at an SSI meeting, which saw "Dave Gibbons, Kevin O'Neill... [t]hen Alan Davis and Mark Farmer." Following the artists, "Alan Grant went across and, at some point, a certain tall hairy writer from the Midlands."

In 1982, DC editor Len Wein chose Bolland to be the artist on DC's Camelot 3000 12-issue maxi-series, with writer Mike W. Barr. The story, dealing with the return of King Arthur to save England from an alien invasion in the year 3000, not only the largest body of work in a single series by Bolland – and his only attempt to draw a monthly title – but was also the first maxi-series from DC or any other publisher. Bolland was not familiar with the Arthurian legends, and initially conceived Merlin as a comical character. The series was graced with considerable media hype, and Bolland found himself invited to San Diego Comic-Con and other conventions. Bolland was allowed to pick between two inkers, but opted to ink his covers himself. Bolland was uncomfortable with having a third party ink his pencils, and later admitted that he put a high level of detail into his art for the series to leave as little room as possible for the inker to creatively reinterpret his work. However, he was satisfied with the finished results. Reacting indignantly to being presented with Ross Andru layouts for the first two Camelot 3000 covers, he

chose to ignore [the Andru design] completely and come up with my own unapproved design. Len Wein rejected it and told me to do the Ross Andru one. Grudgingly I drew the number one cover that made it onto the issue – but as a protest I reversed the letter N in my signature as a code to remind myself that my "artistic integrity" had been despoiled. I liked the backwards N enough to keep it from that day on.

Camelot 3000 had lengthy delays between its final issues. Bolland recalled that he and DC spoke often about how long the series would take to complete, and because the series was inked by other artists, he started off enthusiastically working on issues. As the series continued, however, Bolland became increasingly meticulous, always trying to improve upon his pages. The added details he introduced into his artwork caused significant delays in the final issues of the limited series, causing issues #8–11 to be released on a quarterly rather than monthly status, and the final issue to be cover dated nine months later than the penultimate issue.

Bolland drew a pinup for Superman No. 400 (Oct. 1984) and its companion portfolio. In 1986, Bolland was one of several artists who contributed pages to the anniversary issue Batman No. 400 (Oct. 1986), his offering featuring villains Ra's al Ghul and Catwoman. Around this time, Titan Books were trying to launch a line of comics written by Alan Moore, including a Batman Meets Judge Dredd one-off by Moore and Bolland.

Origin of the Joker in Batman: The Killing Joke. Art by Brian Bolland and John Higgins.

After watching the 1928 film The Man Who Laughs, which features a character named Gwynplaine (played by Conrad Veidt) whose rictus grin inspired the visual design of the Joker, Bolland conceived of the 1988 graphic novel Batman: The Killing Joke. The book was written by Alan Moore to great critical acclaim, winning the Eisner Award for Best Graphic Album, and has been regarded as one of the all-time best Joker stories, and one of the greatest Batman graphic novels ever. Director Tim Burton has named The Killing Joke as an influence for his 1989 film adaptation of Batman, specifically the origin of the Joker. It would also prove to be highly influential on future Batman and Joker stories, though it has also been met with criticism for the violence inflicted on the character Barbara Gordon.

Speaking circa 2000, Bolland said that since The Killing Joke he has only drawn comics that he also wrote. Six years later he clarified that

Since then I haven't wanted to draw comics that anyone else has had a hand in. I'd rather not work on a story I haven't written myself or one that will ultimately be colored by someone else. I have to earn a living, though. Covers are a safe place for me. If someone else's colors swamp my work then, who cares. It was only one page. I can move on...

Bolland had expressed some dissatisfaction with the final book, regretting that its impending schedule for release meant he could not colour the book himself, with John Higgins instead being the colorist. In March 2008, the twentieth anniversary hardcover edition of The Killing Joke saw the release of the artwork as Bolland intended it, and is completely recoloured by Bolland himself. The book made The New York Times Best Seller list in May 2009.

In 1996, Bolland wrote and drew the story "An Innocent Guy" for the anthology Batman: Black and White, in which an otherwise normal inhabitant of Gotham City documents his plan to carry out the ultimate perfect crime and assassinate the Dark Knight Detective. Drawing inspiration from a cover by Alex Toth, and intended as an homage to the Silver Age Batman, Bolland wrote in 2006 that "If anyone were to ask me what is the thing I've done in my career that I'm most pleased with, it would be this."

Approached by Batman-editor Mark Chiarello, Bolland was asked whether he would like to draw Batman covers for a new title, Batman: Gotham Knights. Excited by the opportunity, he remarks that a misunderstanding resulted in his being unaware of the first issue being scheduled, resulting in Dave Johnson drawing No. 1 instead, and Bolland joining at issue No. 2. Bolland's first two covers were coloured by editor Chiarello, but from issue No. 5 to No. 47 (his last) they were coloured by the artist himself. As his run progressed, the cover art on Gotham Knights was increasingly done by Chiarello and other artists, and Bolland's first ideas for covers were rejected more often. Eventually, Bolland was told that he'd be done on the title within a few issues, but after discovering that upcoming covers featured Bane prominently (and not the Joker or Penguin as he had been hoping for some time), Bolland offered to leave immediately.

=== Covers ===
Although his forays into interior artwork are almost universally acclaimed, Bolland is now far more commonly seen as 'just' a cover artist – although he notes that he has never decided to actually solely create covers, having merely explored other jobs from strip work. He admits that he works slowly, and consequently finds covers easier to supply than whole story artwork. He also noted simply that he began to focus on covers simply because they were the assignments he was offered. He adds that for artists like him that are well known for covers, editors will usually ask for pin-ups instead.

Bolland has contributed covers – in many cases to complete runs/arcs – to comics since the 1990s, with his photo-realistic work on the titles for which he works as the primary external reference image.

Bolland now draws on a computer, eschewing pencil and paper. He cites the influence of Dave Gibbons, who was himself enthusiastic about the capabilities of computers. Noting also that some colorists were increasingly using computer effects on a whim, he decided if he did not do the colouring himself, the effects would produce covers that didn't resemble his work. Starting in 1997, Bolland bought a lot of software and spent ten frustrated months learning the ropes and ultimately finding the liberating ability to adapt his now-solely-onscreen artwork. He states categorically that, in his opinion, drawing on his Wacom tablet is no different from drawing on a pad of paper. Having fully embraced the technology, Bolland has also produced a number of lessons/tutorials on his official website demonstrating his complex techniques. He states that, while this leap means that he no longer produces any paper-based artwork (a profitable sideline for many artists who sell on their original work to collectors), he was certain on abandoning pen and paper.

Bolland recalls that, in the wake of The Killing Joke, he received plenty of work offers, but didn't feel ready to make a long commitment. So, instead

[a]fter Killing Joke, DC asked me to do the covers on Animal Man, and I said fine, expecting it to be maybe ten or so. I ended up doing sixty-three. It became almost habitual, and it did mean that there would at least be something new of mine out there to look at.

==== Animal Man ====
Cover of Animal Man #19 (Jan. 1990). Art by Bolland.

The first 63 issues of Animal Man featuring Bolland's artwork covered the tenures of writers Grant Morrison, Peter Milligan, Tom Veitch and Jamie Delano, with Bolland's images maintaining a continuity of style and imagery while the interior work underwent several changes of style and storyline. Initially, he recalls that his cover images derived directly from the script. He would find a scene from the interior art that appeared to make for a good cover, or use a hook on the cover that outlined the plot of the issue. This included the incorporation of photographs into the later covers of Morrison's tale of metafiction and deus ex machina author-input. With the (post-Morrison) move of Animal Man to DC's new 'Mature Readers' imprint Vertigo, Bolland notes that the covers moved to full color paintings with issue No. 57. These of his covers were "a mixture of ink linework, color washes, airbrush and then, eventually, areas painted in poster color by my wife, Rachel," which ultimately saw her have significant input on some covers, with Bolland acknowledging that some of his final Animal Man covers were mostly her work.

Describing the art of good covers, Bolland remarks that

[y]ou really have to be constantly thinking of ways that the image on the cover will intrigue and lure in the potential punter. It helps to try and imagine your cover is in a whole bank of thirty or more and you need it to stand out.

Coincidentally, when a time travel story arc saw Bolland's work coincide with the plot in such a way that he was able to produce a recreated cover from an alternate angle to shed new light on an initially inconsequential image.

==== The Invisibles ====
Bolland's covers adorn the whole second and third volumes of Grant Morrison's The Invisibles and his depictions of the main characters are widely reprinted as the definitive images, despite them all having been realised by other artists – and often drawn by several before Bolland entered the picture. With this title, the artist remarks the complicated subject matter necessitated his "working a lot of strange symbolism and subliminal messages into the cover designs" to create "an image that puzzles to a degree and is layered with elements of surrealism." Asked to take over from Sean Hughes on the covers for volume two by editor Shelly Roeberg, Bolland found her to be an ideal editor, effusive with praise and specific in requirements. Generally, Bolland recalls she was excited for his ideas, although Morrison had approval on all designs as the series creator. Finding that he had a rapport with, and the trust of, his editor, Bolland thinks that these factors led to some of his most experimental work. Newly embracing the use of a computer, Bolland cites The Invisibles Vol 2 No. 11 as his earliest computer-assisted piece of artwork.

For the third series,

we [Bolland and Morrison] talked about trying to make the covers look different in some way, and when DC decided to number the issues backwards [from 12 to 1; to count down to the Millennium], that set me thinking. I remember seeing Peter Greenaway's film Drowning By Numbers, in which they had these numbers placed subtly in every scene, and I really liked that idea. So I began to include elements of the issue number... always trying to think of ways to hide it, or make it an integral design element.

The covers for the third volume of The Invisibles were done using a computer, in part because Vertigo had requested "painted" covers and Bolland felt that line and flat color wouldn't suffice. The experimental nature of the twelve covers was assisted by the fact that neither Bolland or Roeberg saw the issue script. For the trade paperback covers, Bolland "was determined to make each one weirder than the last," and so created a Francis Bacon inspired "fleshy mass [dubbed "The Blobby Man"] with a typewriter" for Entropy in the UK. Having convinced Karen Berger (Editor in chief of Vertigo) and Roeberg that it was a good idea, the artist recalls that "Shelly rang up and, rather than telling me how wonderful I was, said that when she saw it she nearly lost her lunch! I was asked to turn his skin color from flesh to blue to tone him down a bit." For the final Invisible Kingdom TPB cover, Bolland produced a cover featuring 12 small alternative Invisibles covers, which had been very time consuming. Likening the process to creating "a mini comic strip," Bolland says that "if any detail made any sense it had to be changed to something that didn't."

Bolland's style includes the initial 'rough' outline stage, making it easy for the publisher (and, in some cases, the writer) to "sign off" on his designs. In the case of The Invisibles, however, although Morrison officially had final approval on cover art, Bolland described him as generous to the work Bolland came up with. In selected cases, however, Bolland would ask for ideas, and in one specific case "Shelly [Roeberg], the editor... did once relay that Grant wanted an arm coming out of the water holding a gun on the cover of the last issue." Bolland admits "I don't know exactly why. I just supplied it."

==== Wonder Woman ====
Bolland also contributed a large number of covers to Wonder Woman, beginning with William Messner Loebs's first issue (#63, June 1992) after that author took over writer (and artist) George Pérez's 1987 post-Crisis relaunch. Bolland recalls his time drawing Wonder Woman fondly, as one of the few occasions he actually sought work rather than being sought for work. He recalls

I usually sit at home optimistically hoping that people love me enough to ring me and offer me work. The end result is that most of the time I'm doing what other people want and not what I want. Wonder Woman was an exception. I happened to mention to Tom Peyer, my editor on Animal Man, that I'd love to draw Wonder Woman covers... [a]t the time, despite her long history at DC, her iconic appearance, even her cult TV series, she wasn't a character that A-list artists were lining up to draw. Well, I wasn't an A-list artist, so I was keen to have a crack at her.

Bolland's first cover saw Diana next to the headline: "The Stunning return of comics' greatest heroine!" speaking directly to the reader the words "... Miss me?" Bolland's covers over the next 30-plus issues laid the visual groundwork for the character, and saw Bolland illustrate up to and including the centennial issue No. 100. To prepare for his work, Bolland "clipped pictures of the most beautiful women of the time – Christy Turlington, Stephanie Seymour, etc." saying that he was predominantly interested in their faces, generally doing the body without reference. Interested particularly in drawing the costume, which he feels "has to be one of the sexiest in comics," he soon found the character removed from her normal costume in the storyline. For her return to her famous costume, Bolland produced the Britannia-esque pose from Wonder Woman #72 (Mar 1993). He says that "[i]mages like that... usually arise when you're completely stuck for an idea." The image was so iconic that it was released as a poster and later turned into a statue. Shortly thereafter, Diana underwent another costume change – this time designed by Bolland, and mostly drawn on the interior pages by Mike Deodato. The black costume was roundly disliked, even by its designer, Bolland, who philosophically says only that "it was what was asked for at the time," and – aside from Camelot 3000 – is the lone instance he was asked to design a costume. The new costume – black hotpants, halter top, straight hair (which Bolland did like) and "WW"-emblazoned jacket – was based, Bolland recalled, on a Versace outfit that Cindy Crawford wore for Vogue magazine.

==== Other cover work ====
A rare Marvel cover for Hellstorm: Prince of Lies No. 16 (July 1994).

Bolland notes that while he tends not to reuse cover ideas, he does occasionally produce homages to his past covers. Particularly, for the first Eagle Judge Dredd comic issue – which repackaged 2000 AD stories for the American market – on which the positioning of the figures echoed similar covers Bolland had drawn "two or three times for different companies with different characters."

In addition to his landmark runs on Animal Man and The Invisibles, Bolland has also produced lengthy runs on covers for Geoff Johns' The Flash (from roughs by series editor Joey Cavalieri) and the Batman anthology series Batman: Gotham Knights, as well as assorted issues of Tank Girl (for original UK publication Deadline and the two subsequent Vertigo miniseries Tank Girl: The Odyssey and Tank Girl: Apocalypse), Superman, Green Lantern, Batman and many more, including a number of oneshots and miniseries for DC's offshoot Vertigo. From 2007 to 2011, Bolland was the cover artist on Vertigo's Fables spin-off Jack of Fables, replacing previous cover artist James Jean. Bolland's covers also appear on the DC/Vertigo trade paperback collections of Grant Morrison's Doom Patrol, although he only produced some of covers for the individual issues. He recalls that he sent a number of rough artwork that was often rejected, much to his disappointment, as previous cover artist Simon Bisley had been "a hard act to follow."

Long-standing familiarity with DC characters and staff, coupled with high demand have combined with other factors to mean that the vast majority of Bolland's work has been for DC Comics. In The Art of Brian Bolland, he also mentions in passing that a bad experience with a Marvel UK Hulk cover and a later oddity with a She-Hulk cover featuring Howard the Duck have given him a mild "phobia" of Marvel and the company's production line method that overrules his art style. He has however, produced odd covers for Marvel, First Comics, Continuity Comics, Eclipse Comics, New Comics and a dozen other companies, large and small, as well as book, magazine and record covers. For Dark Horse Comics, Bolland has produced several diverse covers, including a couple for Michael Chabon's The Amazing Adventures of the Escapist at the behest of editor Diana Schutz. He recalled that the cover of the tenth issue would've had the style of Hergé's The Adventures of Tintin, but it was cancelled after eight issues.

Bolland is noted by some for his use of bondage imagery, although in a humorous self-referential comment, he quotes this "fact" (cited as from Wikipedia), and states that he is unsure of the sentiment's accuracy. He notes that "I can only think off-hand of a few occasions when I've drawn bondage. A few Wonder Woman covers perhaps, a Flash cover, a 2000 AD cover, a Mr. Mamoulian page... but that's all that I can remember out of many hundreds of images." In 2006's The Art of Brian Bolland, he does suggest that "I trace my mild bondage fetish back to a book of Bible stories that must have been given to my father as a Sunday school gift when he was a child," wherein "was a picture of Shadrach, Meshach and Abednigo [sic]." Such Biblical imagery was bolstered in 1971 by a book bought in Paris "called Les Filles de Papier... [a] large part of [which] was taken up with comic strips about women tied up in fiendish and excruciating positions by mad robots... it was just jaw-droppingly bonkers... and yet... there was something rather appealing about it." The Art of Brian Bolland also features a separate "Nudes" section, mostly created for the purpose of experimenting with different inking techniques or practicing figures from difficult angles. Only three of the nude sketches involve scenes of bondage.

== Other comics work ==
In addition to his early forays into full interior strip art, and his later focus on covers, Bolland has also produced a number of short – often single pages – strips, numerous pin-ups and a pair of ongoing irregular humour strips. These latter feature Bolland as writer-artist, his now-preferred method of working. Most notable are Bolland's two "personal projects", Mr. Mamoulian and The Actress and the Bishop, all appearances of which strips were collected in the book Bolland Strips! (Palmano-Bennet/Knockabout Comics, 2005). Bolland Strips! stemmed from a suggestion by Josh Palmano (owner of Gosh Comics in London, and also involved in publishing company Knockabout Comics) to collect all instances of Bolland's two strips and Steve Moore's "Zirk" story. Bolland had other thoughts, and suggested including an undrawn 20-page story called "The Actress & the Bishop and the Thing in the Shed" (written 18 years previously), and two stories written and illustrated by him for Vertigo Comics. After negotiations with DC, the two stories – "Princess & the Frog" (from Heartthrobs) and "The Kapas" (from Strange Adventures) were included alongside six limited edition Éditions Déesse prints.

=== Mr. Mamoulian ===
Among Bolland's other works is the Robert Crumb-esque semi-autobiographical stream of consciousness humour strip Mr. Mamoulian, which was first printed in Paul Gravett's UK pro-zine Escape and later brought to the US in issues of the Dark Horse title Cheval Noir and the Caliber Comics anthology Negative Burn. Bolland recalled that the origins of the character lay in him contemplating middle age on his 36th birthday, and experimenting with drawing "whatever came into my head". The name echoes the character's mammalian look, resembling a hedgehog, although Bolland acknowledges that Armenian-American film director Rouben Mamoulian likely provided an inspiration on the name front. Noting his enjoyment of Berke Breathed's Bloom County, Bolland's own strip wasn't always humorous, reflecting Bolland's own mood at times. Thus the strip became an exposé of Bolland's inner self drawn out of a personal desire to do so, as a forum to explore and express "various interests of mine, various philosophical notions, personal neuroses." Designed to be read individually – indeed, early publication in Escape was in "no particular order" – gradually it became clear that a mildly self-referential wider chronological narrative had been established. For example, a plot concluded on one page might've continued in a future volume.

Bolland wrote in 2006 that Nick Landau of Titan Books was impressed by Mr. Mamoulian and became Bolland's unofficial agent. Through Landau, Bolland saw his strip published across Europe in publications including Linus, Cimoc and (in Sweden) Pox. Such widespread exposure had its downside, when the original artwork went missing, meaning that later reprints of Mamoulian had to be made from Bolland's photocopies. Disenchanted by the loss of (more of) his artwork, and with declining European interest, Bolland ceased drawing the strip. Subsequent to the collection Bolland Strips!, however, interest from Negative Burn (now published by Desperado Publishing) had persuaded the artist to make more pages.

=== The Actress and the Bishop ===
Bolland's other "personal project" is his occasional strip "The Actress and the Bishop". This strip's origins date back to 1985, when Frederick Manzano commissioned Bolland to "draw 6 plates in my own portfolio bearing my name" for Éditions Déesse, a "small Paris based comic-store-cum-publishers", and Bolland drew in one of the six plates an elderly Bishop (whose face echoed "shamelessly" the work of Alberto Breccia) and a femme fatale Actress. Bolland was subsequently approached by Garry Leach and Dave Elliot, who were publishing a new comic anthology series, A1. They asked Bolland to draw – and write – a couple page to include in the first issue, and Bolland recalls that it was his first commission as both a writer and an artist. Actively seeking to write a story that wouldn't be classified as any particular genre, Bolland found the description 'Whimsy' reached by Leach and Elliot to be very apt, and "rooted in the Englishness" of the artists life.

Written in rhyming couplets, the pair "look like the punchline of a smutty joke," but their creator instead "wanted the reader to see them in a benign and non-judgemental light" – the antithesis of "Benny Hill, Frankie Howerd "Oo er, Mrs!"... [rather] like the owl and the pussycat setting sail in a pea green boat." Three pages in A1 No. 1 were followed by another three in A1 No. 3, while a longer story with 110 verses went unreleased for 17 years until publication in the compendium hardback Bolland Strips!.

=== The Art of Brian Bolland ===
In 2006 a comprehensively sizeable retrospective of Bolland's work was published by Image/Desperado under the title The Art of Brian Bolland, featuring contextualising references and copious text – 33,500 words – written by the artist with Joe Pruett alongside hundreds of pieces of artwork and rare photographs. The Art of Brian Bolland covers all of the artist's work to date, under an introduction from close friend Dave Gibbons, an autobiographical essay and sections ranging from his "Influences" (featuring near-unseen examples of Bolland's childhood art), through each of the decades from the 1960s to the present. The book also showcases several of Bolland's own photographs taken in Asia and Russia over twenty years of travelling.

== Non-comics work ==
Bolland is also an accomplished photographer, with examples of his work being included in the Image/Desperado book The Art of Brian Bolland. In May 2008, Bolland announced on his website that he had begun making a photo book of a week he spent in Burma in 1988. Some photographs taken by Bolland in Burma are reprinted in the Image-published retrospective The Art of Brian Bolland.

Much in demand for advertisements, Bolland has produced work down the years for bookshops – including pioneering UK Sci-Fi/Comics sellers such as Dark They Were, and Golden-Eyed and Forbidden Planet – and film festivals including a poster for BFI Southbank's July/August 2008 Comic-Book Movies series. His work has appeared on the covers of, and inside, numerous publications over the decades, ranging from fanzines to several covers for London-based magazine Time Out and other professional, internationally sold magazines.

Bolland has also produced posters for local theatre groups' amateur stage productions, most notably for his local "village panto" production of Beauty and the Beast in 2004.

== Personal life ==
Bolland married his girlfriend, illustrator and sometime-collaborator Rachel Birkett in 1981. She later gave up illustration and became a cook for a vegetarian restaurant, although she has since assisted her husband with his work, acting as colourist, inker, co-artist and ghost. The two have a son.

== Awards ==
=== Wins ===
Bolland and his work have received recognition in both the British and American comics industry. He was awarded the "Best Newcomer" award by the Society of Strip Illustration in 1977.

In 1982, he received an Inkpot Award, and the following year, he was named "Favourite Artist" in the British section of the Eagle Awards.

In 1989, Moore and Bolland's The Killing Joke received an Eisner Award for "Best Graphic Album," while Bolland was named separately as "Best Artist/Penciller/Inker" for the same work. The same year, Bolland won three Harvey Awards; two in the same categories for the same work – "Best Artist" and "Best Graphic Album" – while the third was also The Killing Joke which was separately honoured as the winner of the "Best Single Issue" award.

In 1992, Bolland won an Eisner Award after being named "Best Cover Artist," an honour he received three years in a row (1992–1994), and twice subsequently (1999, 2001) for various works.

In 2007, Bolland added to his Eisner Award wins when The Art of Brian Bolland won the "Best Comics-Related Book" award.

=== Nominations ===
The Camelot 3000 limited series, which he created with Mike W. Barr, was nominated for the 1985 Kirby Award for Best Finite Series, narrowly losing to Marv Wolfman and George Pérez's Crisis on Infinite Earths. In 2002, he placed second behind Jack Kirby for the title of "Best Artist Ever" in the short-lived National Comics Awards.

== Bibliography ==
Interior comic work includes:

- 2000 AD (IPC Media):
  - Dan Dare: "Greenworld, Part 2" (with Gerry Finley-Day and Dave Gibbons, in No. 35, 1977)
  - Judge Dredd:
    - "The Mega-City 5000, Part 2" (with John Howard, in No. 41, 1977)
    - "Land Race" (with John Howard, in No. 47, 1978)
    - "The Lunar Olympics" (with John Howard, in No. 50, 1978)
    - "Luna 1 War" (with John Howard, in No. 51, 1978)
    - "The Face-Change Crimes" (with John Howard, in No. 52, 1978)
    - "The Oxygen Board" (with John Howard, in No. 57, 1978)
    - "Full Earth Crimes" (with John Howard, in No. 58, 1978)
    - "The Cursed Earth":
      - "Part 5: The Mutie Mountains" (with Pat Mills, in No. 65, 1978)
      - "Part 9: The Slay-Riders!" (with Pat Mills, in No. 69, 1978)
      - "Part 10: Requiem for an Alien!" (with Pat Mills, in No. 70, 1978)
      - "Part 17: Giants aren't Gentlemen!" (with Jack Adrian, in No. 77, 1978)
      - "Part 18: Soul Food" (with Jack Adrian, in No. 78, 1978)
      - "Parts 21–22: Tweak's Story" (with Pat Mills, in #81–82, 1978)
    - "Crime and Punishment" (with John Howard, in No. 86, 1978)
    - "Outlaw" (with John Howard and Dave Gibbons, in No. 87, 1978)
    - "The Day the Law Died!" (with John Howard):
      - "Part 6: Behold the Hordes of Klegg!" (with Garry Leach, in No. 94, 1978)
      - "Part 7" (with Garry Leach, in No. 95, 1978)
      - "Part 10" (in No. 98, 1979)
      - "Parts 13–14" (in #101–102, 1979)
    - "Punks Rule!" (with John Howard, in No. 110, 1979)
    - "The Forever Crimes" (with John Howard, in No. 120, 1979)
    - "Father Earth" (with John Howard, in #122–123, 1979)
    - "Night of the Fog" (with John Howard, in No. 127, 1979)
    - "Judge Death" (with John Howard, in #149–151, 1980)
    - "The Judge Child" (with John Howard):
      - "Part 1" (in No. 156, 1980)
      - "Part 7" (in No. 162, 1980)
      - "Parts 17–18" (in #172–173, 1980)
    - "Block War" (with John Howard, in No. 182, 1980)
    - "Judge Death Lives" (with T.B Grover, in #224–228, 1981)
    - "Block Mania, Part 9" (with T.B Grover, in No. 244, 1981)
    - "The Alien Zoo" (with John Wagner, in Annual '82, 1981)
  - Tharg's Future Shocks: "Solo Flip" (with Jack Adrian, in No. 52, 1978)
  - Walter the Wobot (with Joe Collins):
    - "Walter's Brother" (in #52–56, 1978)
    - "Radio Walter" (in No. 57, 1978)
    - "Master-Mind" (in No. 58, 1978)
    - "The Fwankenheim Monster" (in #59–61, 1978)
    - "Frankenheim's Finest Hour!" (in No. 67, 1978)
    - "Grin and Bear It!" (in No. 68, 1978)
- Graphixus #3: "Little Nympho in Slumberland Meets Benny Bunny" (script and art, Graphic Eye, 1978)
- Madame Xanadu #1: "Falling Down to Heaven..." (with J.M. DeMatteis, DC Comics, 1981)
- Mystery in Space #115: "Certified Safe" (with Arnold Drake, DC Comics, 1981)
- Justice League of America #200: "A League Divided" (with Gerry Conway, among other artists, 1982)
- Warrior #3: "Zirk: Silver Sweater of the Spaceways" (with Pedro Henry, Quality Communications, 1982)
- Camelot 3000 #1–12 (with Mike W. Barr, DC Comics, 1982–1985)
- Grimjack #22: "Mother's Calling" (with John Ostrander, First Comics, 1986)
- Batman #400: "Resurrection Night!" (with Doug Moench, among other artists, DC Comics, 1986)
- Outrageous Tales from the Old Testament: "Elisha's Miracle" (script and art, anthology graphic novel, Knockabout, 1987)
- The Outsiders #18: "Freeway of Fear!" (with Mike W. Barr, DC Comics, 1987)
- Real War Stories #1: "The Elite of the Fleet" (with Mike W. Barr, Eclipse, 1987)
- Power Comics #1–4 (with Don Avenell, Norman Worker and Dave Gibbons, Eclipse, 1988)
- Batman: The Killing Joke (with Alan Moore, graphic novel, DC Comics, 1988)
- AARGH! #1: "A Page from Brian Bolland" (script and art, Mad Love, 1988)
- Wonder Woman Annual #1: "Epilogue" (with George Pérez, DC Comics, 1988)
- A1 (script and art, Atomeka):
  - "The Actress and the Bishop Go Boating" (in No. 1, 1989)
  - "The Actress and the Bishop Throw a Party" (in No. 3, 1989)
  - "Parcels of Events" (in True Life Bikini Confidential, 1990)
- Cheval Noir No. 3, 5–9, 11–12, 15–18 (Mr. Mamoulian strips, script and art, Dark Horse, 1989–1991)
- Freak Show: "Harry the Head" (script and art, anthology graphic novel, Dark Horse, 1992)
- Legends of Arzach #6: "The Fountains of Summer" (with Jean-Marc Lofficier, among other artists, Kitchen Sink, 1992)
- Negative Burn #1–5, 7–14, 16, 18–22, 24–27, 29, 33, 35, 38–39, 42–50 (Mr. Mamoulian strips, script and art, Caliber, 1993–1997)
- Batman: Black and White #4: "An Innocent Guy" (script and art, DC Comics, 1996)
- Heartthrobs #1: "The Princess and the Frog" (script and art, Vertigo, 1999)
- Strange Adventures #1: "The Kapas" (script and art, Vertigo, 1999)
- Negative Burn #1–5, 13, Summer Special, Winter Special (Mr. Mamoulian strips, script and art, Desperado Publishing, 2005–2007)
- Fables: 1001 Nights of Snowfall: "What You Wish for" (with Bill Willingham, graphic novel, Vertigo, 2006)
- 52 (DC Comics):
  - "The Origin of Animal Man" (with Mark Waid, co-feature, in No. 19, 2006)
  - "The Origin of Zatanna" (with Mark Waid, co-feature, in No. 34, 2006)
- Countdown to Final Crisis #31: "The Origin of Joker" (with Mark Waid, co-feature, DC Comics, 2007)
- DC Universe: Legacies #7: "Snapshot: Reunion!" (with Len Wein, co-feature, DC Comics, 2011)
- Wasted #6: "Shit the Dog: Relish That!" (with Alan Grant and John Wagner, Bad Press, 2011)
- The Spirit #17: "Strange Bedfellows" (with Howard Chaykin, DC Comics, 2011)

=== Covers only ===
- 2000 AD No. 11, 15–17, 19, 20, 23, 27, 30, 45, 105, 121, 131, 134, 144, 146, 161, 166–167, 197, 199, 210, 213, 215–216, 236, 240, 242, 248, 403, 848, 891, Prog 2000, 1336, 1505, Sci-Fi Special '79 and '81, Judge Dredd Annual '81, Annual '83, Judge Dredd Mega-Special '88 (IPC Media/Fleetway/Rebellion Developments, 1977–2006)
- Starlord No. 2, Annual '81 (IPC Media, 1978–1980)
- Green Lantern No. 127, 130–131 (DC Comics, 1980)
- Adventure Comics No. 475 (DC Comics, 1980)
- Justice League of America No. 189–190 (DC Comics, 1981)
- Tales of the Green Lantern Corps No. 1–3 (DC Comics, 1981)
- DC Comics Presents No. 43 (DC Comics, 1982)
- Amazing Heroes No. 14, 52, 191, 197 (Fantagraphics, 1982–1991)
- Judge Dredd No. 1–10, 15–33 (Eagle, 1983–1986)
- Judge Dredd: The Judge Child Quest No. 1–5 (Eagle, 1984)
- Axel Pressbutton No. 1 (Eclipse, 1984)
- 2000 AD Monthly No. 2, 5 (Eagle, 1985)
- Judge Dredd's Crime Files No. 1–2 (Eagle, 1985)
- Action Comics No. 571, 609 (DC Comics, 1985–1988)
- Elvira's House of Mystery No. 1 (DC Comics, 1986)
- Detective Comics No. 559, Annual No. 2 (DC Comics, 1986–1989)
- Tales of the Teen Titans No. 63–65, 77 (DC Comics, 1986–1987)
- Vigilante Annual No. 2 (DC Comics, 1986)
- 2000 AD Monthly vol. 2 No. 1 (Eagle, 1986)
- Judge Dredd No. 34–35 (Quality, 1986)
- Superman No. 422, Annual No. 12 (DC Comics, 1986)
- Howard the Duck No. 33 (Marvel, 1986)
- Secret Origins No. 7, Special No. 1 (DC Comics, 1986–1989)
- ESPers No. 3 (Eclipse, 1986)
- The Outsiders No. 16 (DC Comics, 1987)
- Adventures of the Outsiders No. 45 (DC Comics, 1987)
- Valkyrie No. 2 (Eclipse, 1987)
- Swamp Thing No. 151–153, Annual No. 3 (1987–1995)
- The Comics Journal No. 122 (Fantagraphics, 1988)
- Animal Man No. 1–56 (DC Comics, 1988–1993)
- Legion of Super-Heroes Annual No. 4 (DC Comics, 1988)
- Judge Dredd's Crime File No. 1–4 (Fleetway, 1989)
- Secret Origins of the World's Greatest Super-Heroes TPB (DC Comics, 1989)
- The Greatest Joker Stories Ever Told TPB (DC Comics, 1989)
- Batman No. 445–447 (DC Comics, 1990)
- Revolver Special No. 2 (Fleetway, 1990)
- Prince: Alter Ego No. 1 (Piranha Press, 1991)
- Animal Man TPB (DC Comics, 1991)
- Robin No. 1–5 (DC Comics, 1991)
- Challengers of the Unknown No. 1 (DC Comics, 1991)
- Maze Agency No. 20 (Innovation Publishing, 1991)
- Judge Dredd Megazine No. 16 (Fleetway, 1992)
- Doom Patrol: Crawling from the Wreckage TPB (DC Comics, 1992)
- Wonder Woman No. 0, 63–92, 94–100 (DC Comics, 1992–1995)
- Congorilla No. 1–2 (DC Comics, 1992)
- Animal Man No. 57–63, Annual No. 1 (Vertigo, 1993)
- Doom Patrol No. 64, 75 (Vertigo, 1993–1994)
- Showcase '93 No. 3 (DC Comics, 1993)
- Judge Dredd Megazine vol. 2 No. 31 (Fleetway, 1993)
- Batman: Legends of the Dark Knight No. 50, 119 (DC Comics, 1993–1999)
- Batman: The Collected Legends of the Dark Knight TPB (DC Comics, 1993)
- Kilroy is Here No. 0 (Caliber, 1994)
- Hellstorm: Prince of Lies No. 16 (Marvel, 1994)
- Vamps No. 1–6 (Vertigo, 1994–1995)
- Deadline No. 58 (Deadline, 1994)
- The Atom Special No. 2 (DC Comics, 1995)
- Tank Girl: The Odyssey No. 1–4 (Vertigo, 1995)
- Tank Girl: Apocalypse! No. 1–4 (Vertigo, 1995–1996)
- The Spectre vol. 3 No. 42 (DC Comics, 1996)
- The Batman Chronicles No. 3 (DC Comics, 1996)
- The Flash: The Return of Barry Allen TPB (DC Comics, 1996)
- The Invisibles v2 No. 1–22 (Vertigo, 1997–1999)
- Lobo No. 37 (DC Comics, 1997)
- Kilroy: Daemonstorm No. 1 (Caliber, 1997)
- Predator vs. Judge Dredd No. 1 (Dark Horse, 1997)
- Vertigo: Winter's Edge No. 1 (Vertigo, 1998)
- Corny's Fetish No. 1 (Dark Horse, 1998)
- The Spirit: The New Adventures No. 3 (Kitchen Sink, 1998)
- Gangland No. 2 (Vertigo, 1998)
- Batman Villains: Secret Files and Origins No. 1 (DC Comics, 1998)
- The Invisibles v3 No. 12-1 (Vertigo, 1999–2000)
- Batman: Shadow of the Bat No. 87 (DC Comics, 1999)
- Fanboy No. 6 (DC Comics, 1999)
- Batman: Gotham Knights No. 2–11, 14–21, 23–30, 32–40, 42–47 (DC Comics, 2000–2004)
- Superman and Batman: World's Funnest (DC Comics, 2000)
- Silver Age No. 1 (DC Comics, 2000)
- The Flash No. 164–178, 180–187 (DC Comics, 2000–2002)
- Adventures in the Rifle Brigade No. 1–3 (Vertigo, 2000)
- Comicology No. 4 (TwoMorrows, 2001)
- Joker: Last Laugh No. 1, 6 (DC Comics, 2001–2002)
- Animal Man: Origin of the Species TPB (Vertigo, 2002)
- Zatanna: Everyday Magic (Vertigo, 2003)
- Blood & Water No. 1–5 (Vertigo, 2003)
- Animal Man: Deus Ex Machina TPB (Vertigo, 2003)
- JLA: Zatanna's Search TPB (Vertigo, 2004)
- Green Arrow No. 32 (DC Comics, 2004)
- Doom Patrol Archives Volume 2 HC (DC Comics, 2004)
- Back Issue! No. 3 (TwoMorrows, 2004)
- Catwoman: Nine Lives of the Feline Fatale TPB (DC Comics, 2004)
- Doom Patrol: The Painting That Ate Paris TPB (Vertigo, 2004)
- DC Comics Presents: Green Lantern No. 1 (DC Comics, 2004)
- DC Comics Presents: The Atom No. 1 (DC Comics, 2004)
- Desperado Primer No. 1 (Desperado Publishing, 2005)
- Michael Chabon Presents: The Amazing Adventures of the Escapist No. 7–8 (Dark Horse, 2005)
- DC's Greatest Imaginary Stories TPB (DC Comics, 2005)
- Doom Patrol: Down Paradise Way TPB (Vertigo, 2005)
- Rann-Thanagar War TPB (DC Comics, 2005)
- Steel Claw: The Vanishing Man HC (Titan, 2005)
- DC Universe: The Stories of Alan Moore TPB (DC Comics, 2006)
- Doom Patrol Archives Volume 3 HC (DC Comics, 2006)
- Aquaman No. 39 (DC Comics, 2006)
- Jonah Hex No. 6 (DC Comics, 2006)
- Doom Patrol: Musclebound TPB (Vertigo, 2006)
- Justice Society Volume 1 TPB (DC Comics, 2006)
- Elephantmen No. 3 (Comicraft, 2006)
- Huntress: Darknight Daughter TPB (DC Comics, 2006)
- Doom Patrol: Magic Bus TPB (Vertigo, 2007)
- Justice Society Volume 2 TPB (DC Comics, 2007)
- Harlan Ellison's Dream Corridor TPB (Dark Horse, 2007)
- The Helmet of Fate: Detective Chimp No. 1 (DC Comics, 2007)
- Amazing Transformations of Jimmy Olsen TPB (DC Comics, 2007)
- Deathblow No. 4 (Wildstorm, 2007)
- Jack of Fables No. 12–20, 22–50 (Vertigo, 2007–2011)
- Doom Patrol: Planet Love TPB (Vertigo, 2008)
- Jeff Hawke: Overlord HC (Titan, 2008)
- Femme Noir: The Dark City Diaries No. 1 (Ape Entertainment, 2008)
- Jeff Hawke: Ambassadors HC (Titan, 2008)
- The War That Time Forgot No. 2 (DC Comics, 2008)
- The Spirit No. 26–28 (DC Comics, 2009)
- Superman: Whatever Happened to the Man of Tomorrow? HC (DC comics, 2009)
- Last Days of Animal Man No. 1–6 (DC Comics, 2009)
- Green Lantern Corps No. 45 (DC Comics, 2010)
- DC's Greatest Imaginary Stories: Batman and Robin TPB (DC Comics, 2010)
- Zatanna No. 1–6 (DC Comics, 2010)
- Star-Spangled War Stories No. 1 (DC Comics, 2010)
- Dial H No. 1-15, 0 (DC Comics, 2012-2013)
