= Forbidden Planet (retail chain) =

UK-based science fiction, fantasy and horror collectible shop chain

Forbidden Planet Limited
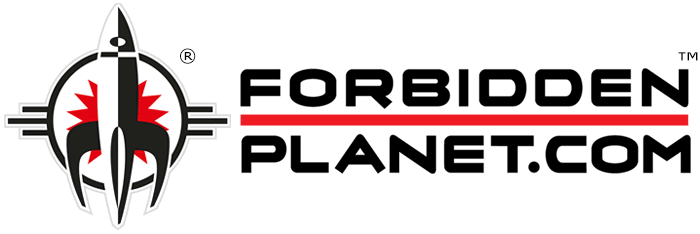
- Type: Private
- Industry: Geek culture and popular culture
- Genre: Retail
- Founded: 1978; 48 years ago, London, UK
- Founders: Nick Landau, Mike Lake, Mike Luckman
- Number of locations: Forbidden Planet: 9 Forbidden Planet International: 17
- Services: Comics, books and collectables
- Owner: Titan Entertainment

Forbidden Planet is the trading name of three separate businesses with online and retail bookstores selling science fiction, fantasy and popular culture products. The original store was opened in London in 1978 named after the 1956 feature film of the same name. Specialising in film and television merchandise, the shops sell comic books, graphic novels, fantasy and horror, manga, DVDs, video games, and a wide variety of co-branded edition/collector's items, promotional apparel and merchandise and collector's items.

== History ==
=== Founding ===
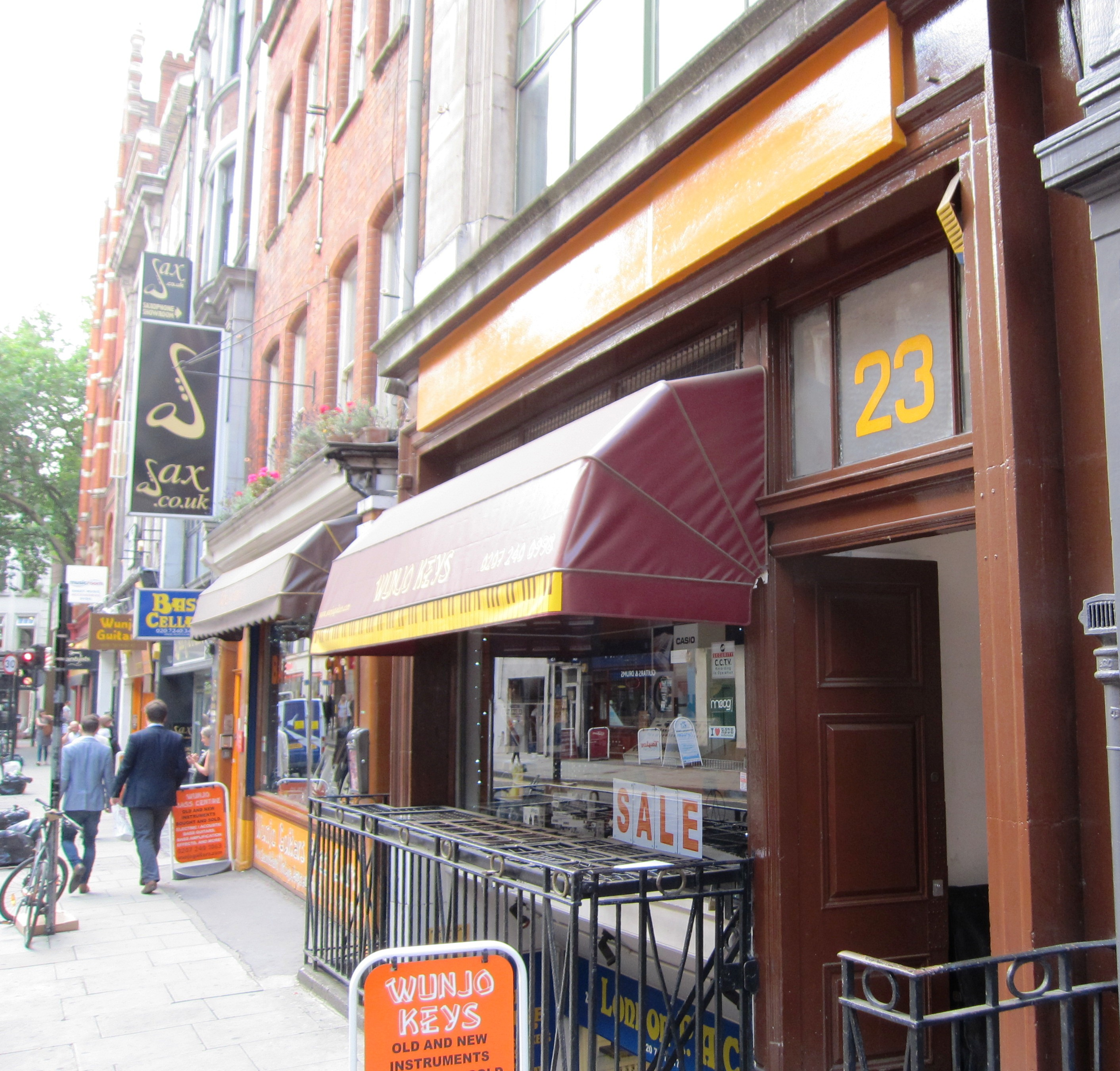
The location of the original store at Number 23, Denmark Street, central London

Forbidden Planet London was the third major comics store in the city, eventually replacing what had been the leading shop, Derek Stokes's Dark They Were, and Golden-Eyed, which had started in 1969, and coming after Frank and Joan Dobson's Weird Fantasy in New Cross. Much of FP's growth came after the demise of Dark They Were, and Golden-Eyed, which went out of business in 1981. Mike Lake, Nick Landau, and Mike Luckman founded Forbidden Planet alongside Titan Distributors (Titan having grown out of Comic Media Distributors).

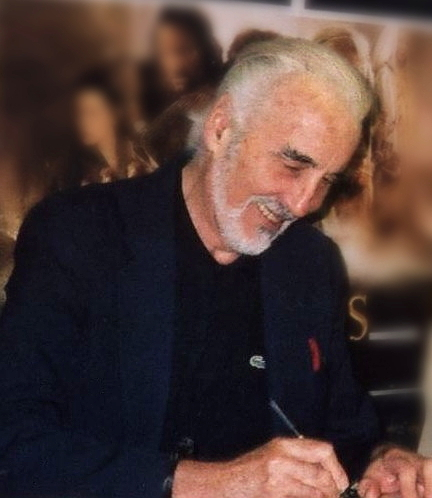
Christopher Lee signing The Two Towers at Forbidden Planet, New Oxford Street

The first Forbidden Planet began life in 1978 as a small store in Denmark Street. Visitors to the store included Stan Lee, Neil Gaiman, Alan Moore and Douglas Adams. When Adams attempted to attend a signing for the first The Hitchhiker's Guide to the Galaxy book in 1979, the queue to the shop was so long that Adams thought a demonstration was taking place elsewhere. As the scope of the store expanded beyond comics to embrace film and television, a second store was opened just around the corner on St Giles High Street. The store's success led to overcrowding, necessitating a move to much larger premises on New Oxford Street.

=== Expansion ===
The original partners, in addition to improving their London store, opened Forbidden Planet New York in 1981.

Landau, Lake, and Luckman later paired with James Hamilton and Kenny Penman to open other stores. Penman and Hamilton were owners of one of the UK's oldest comics and SF stores, Science Fiction Bookshop, in Edinburgh, which had opened under previous owners in 1975.

=== The split ===
In 1992/1993, the original chain split into two firms, called Forbidden Planet and Forbidden Planet Scotland. Landau retained control of the London Forbidden Planet locations, and Lake helped form Forbidden Planet Scotland (later renamed Forbidden Planet International). Luckman, meanwhile, took over ownership of the New York City location.

Forbidden Planet International grew beyond Scotland to include stores throughout the Midlands, in Wales, Northern Ireland, and Ireland.

=== Later developments ===
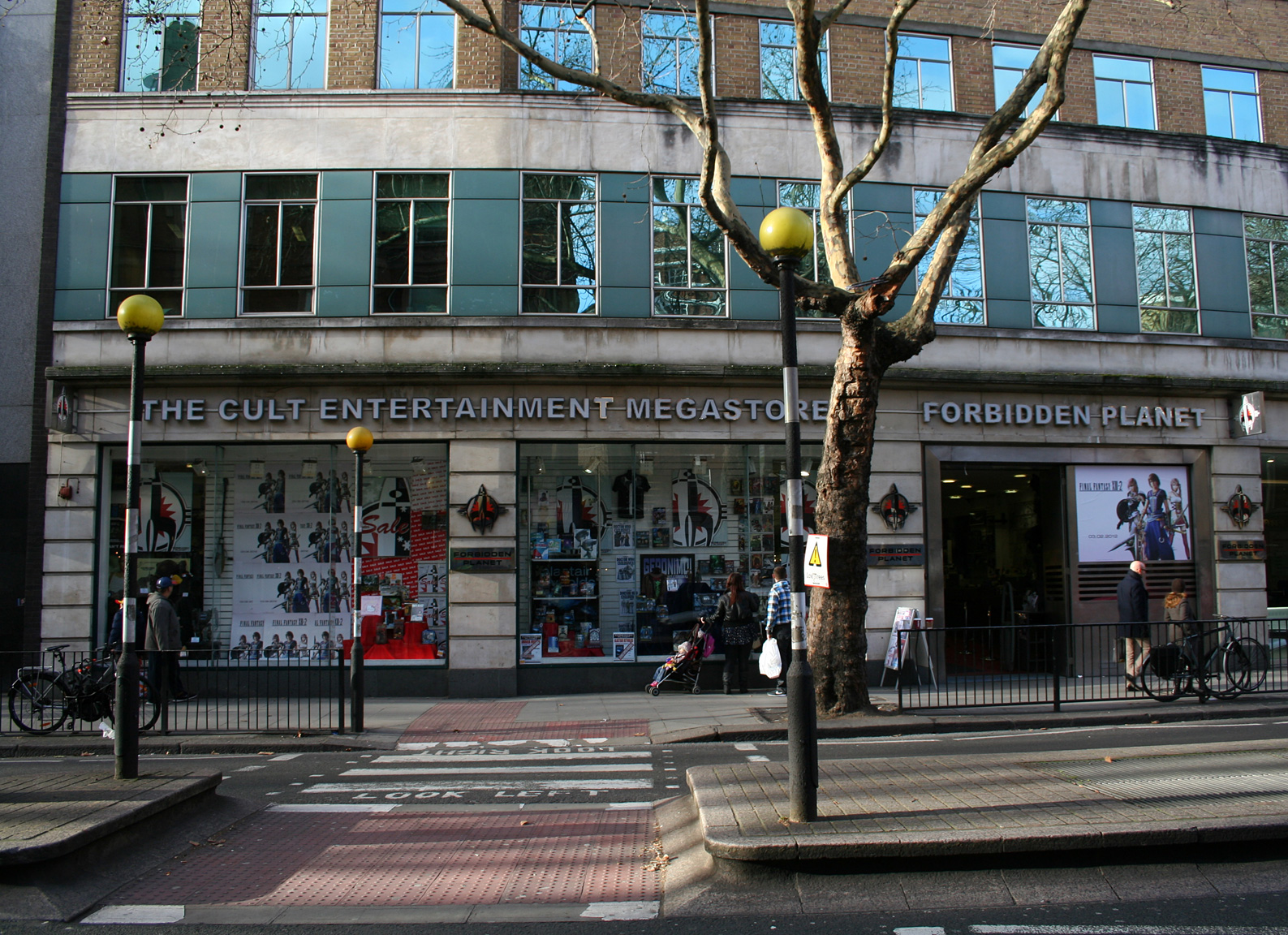
The Forbidden Planet London Megastore on Shaftesbury Avenue, central London

On 30 September 2003, the London store moved to larger premises at the northern end of Shaftesbury Avenue.

Forbidden Planet opened a second Megastore in Clifton Heights in Bristol in 2005, and a third in Southampton in 2007. In 2006 the company launched forbiddenplanet.com, an e-commerce retail site offering a wide range of products and hosting details of the company's many events and signings.

On the evening of 3 December 2023, the Bristol store caught fire; Avon Fire and Rescue Service confirmed that the blaze was not started on purpose. On 30 September 2024 Forbidden Planet confirmed a 7 December 2024 reopening, with a schedule of signings, costumed characters, decorations, and goodie bags.

=== Forbidden Planet NYC ===
The first New York store opened in 1981, located at 56 East 12th Street and Broadway in Greenwich Village. Forbidden Planet NYC was founded by Luckman, with Americans Phil Seuling and Jonni Levas acting as silent partners. (Luckman by that point had moved to New York and became romantically involved with Levas, who was Seuling's partner at Sea Gate Distributors and was his former girlfriend.)

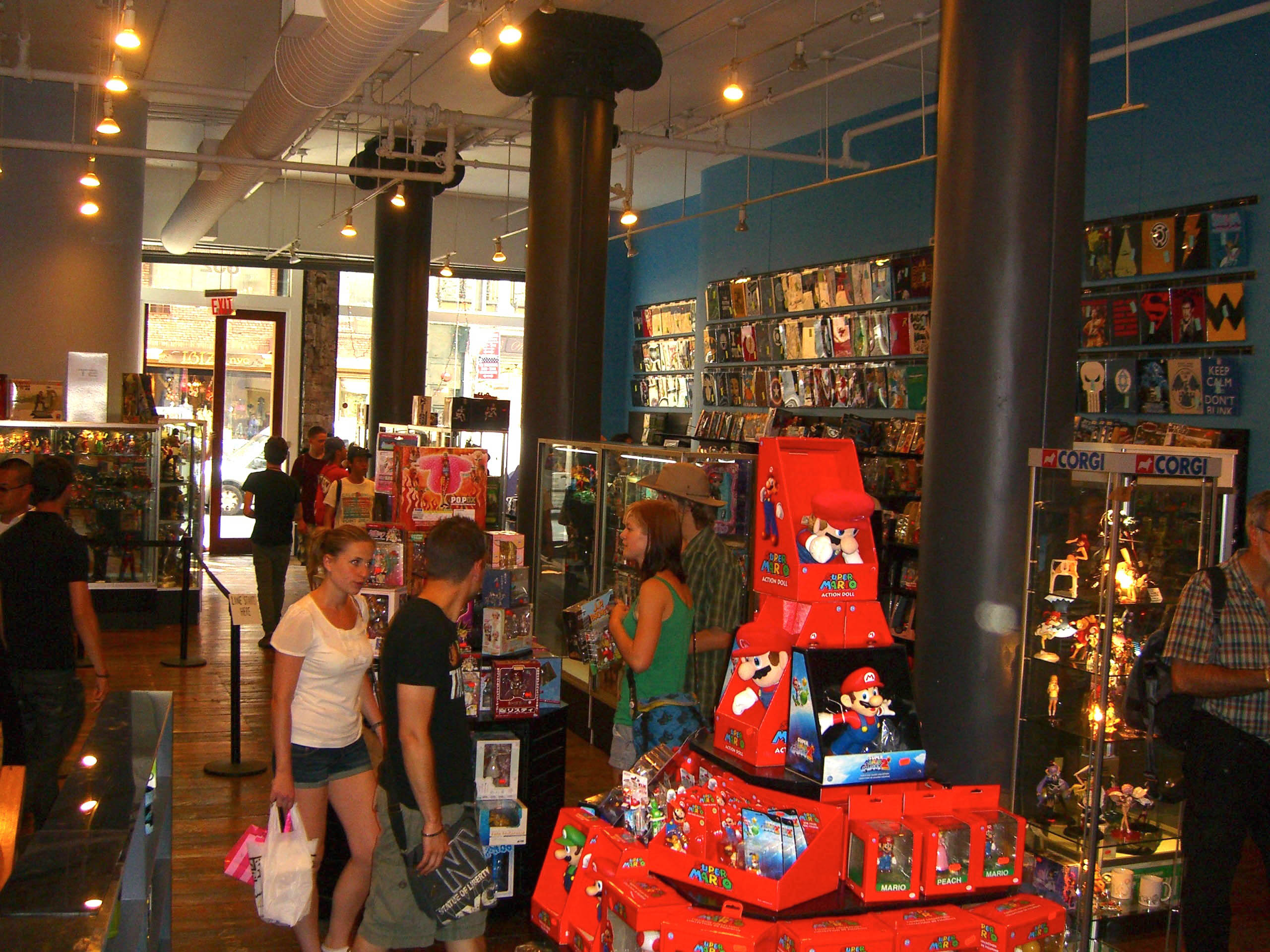
Interior of the Forbidden Planet at 832 Broadway in Manhattan, New York on opening day, 24 July 2012

An additional New York store opened in the mid-1980s at 227 East 59th Street in Lenox Hill, with a smaller selection. Rising rent led to its closure in the mid-1990s.

In the 1990s, the primary New York store moved across the street to a significantly smaller space at 840 Broadway and East 13th Street, and the focus became comic books and graphic novels, with a greatly diminished selection of traditional fiction.

On 24 July 2012, the New York City store moved several doors south to 832 Broadway, where it would enjoy 3,400 square feet of retail space. The New York store is not part of Forbidden Planet International, as they are owned by rival organizations.

Like many shops, Forbidden Planet struggled during the COVID-19 pandemic. The New York branch launched a GoFundMe to survive, in light of the city's high rent.

== Companies ==
=== Forbidden Planet Limited ===
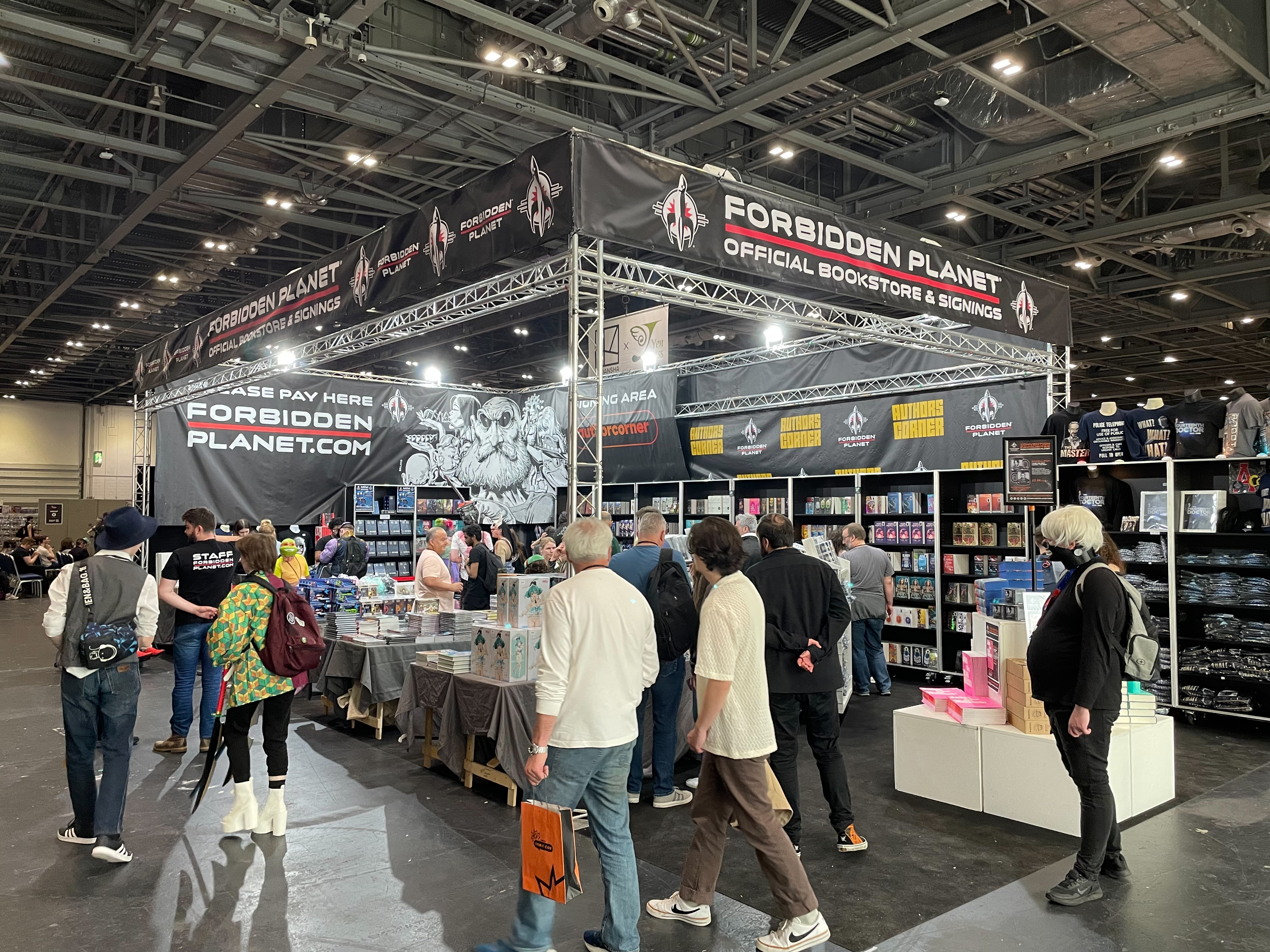
Forbidden Planet stall at ExCeL London, May 2023

Forbidden Planet Limited is division of Titan Entertainment and operate a chain of nine stores around England and an online presence at ForbiddenPlanet.com. They also host signings and events with authors, artists, and other figures from cult media.

Locations

- Birmingham
- Bristol
- Cambridge
- Camden
- Coventry
- Croydon
- Liverpool
- London
- Newcastle Upon Tyne
- Southampton

=== Forbidden Planet International ===
A separate company founded by some of Forbidden Planet's original founders; with Kenny Penman, James Hamilton, Andrew Oddie, and Colin Campbell currently the main shareholders. Their website is forbiddenplanet.co.uk.

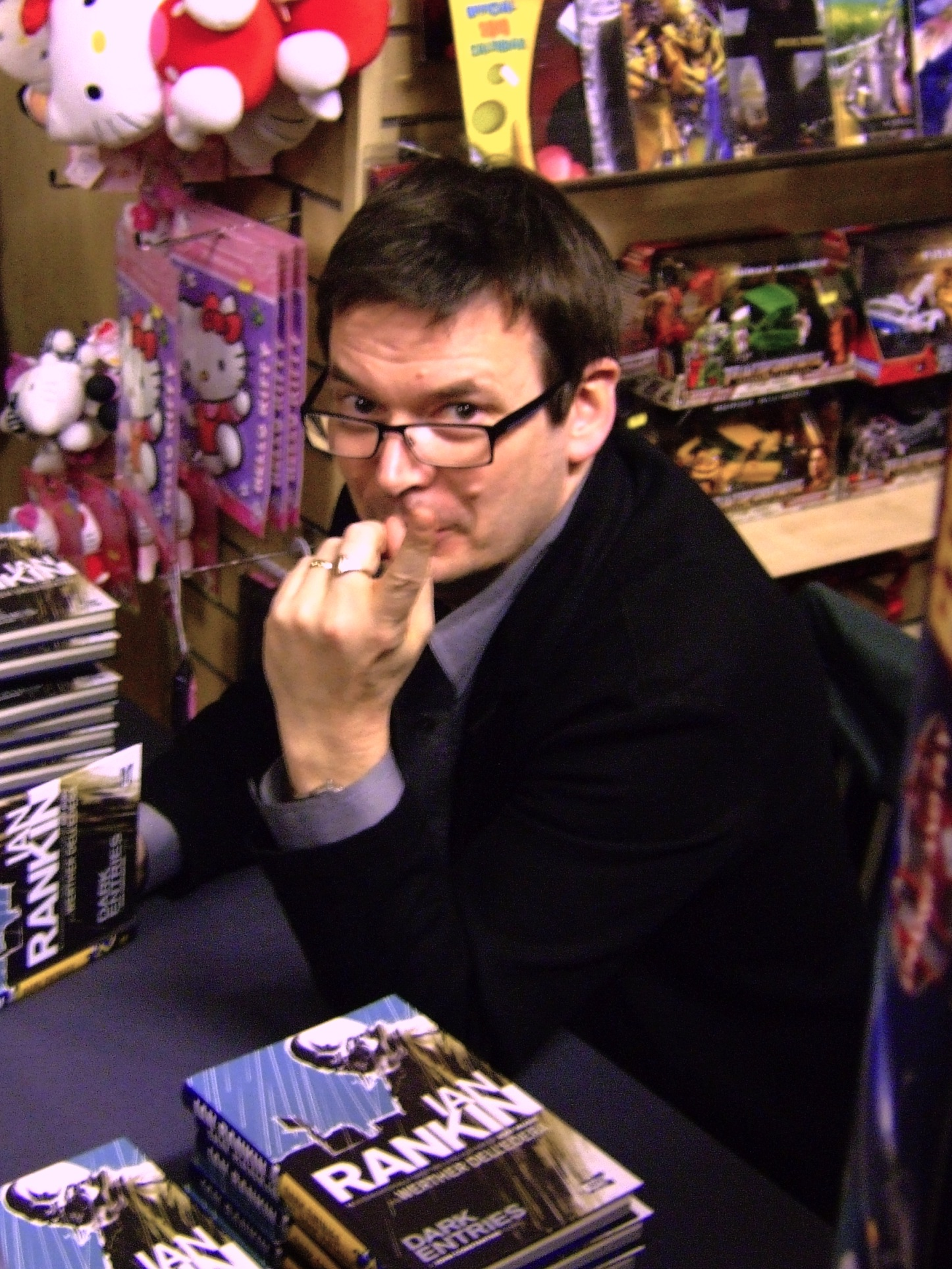
Ian Rankin signing books in Forbidden Planet Edinburgh, 2009

Locations

- Derby
- Belfast
- Birmingham (Worlds Apart [formerly Nostalgia & Comics]; Associate Store)
- Brighton
- Cardiff
- Dublin
- Edinburgh
- Glasgow
- Kingston upon Hull
- Leeds
- Leicester
- Liverpool (Worlds Apart; Associate Store)
- Manchester
- Middlesbrough
- Norwich
- Nottingham
- Sheffield
- Stoke-on-Trent - Hanley
- Wolverhampton

=== Forbidden Planet NYC ===
Spin-off Forbidden Planet NYC is an independent store in New York City.

== In popular culture ==
=== In comics ===
- The Denmark Street store appeared in a Captain Britain story that ran in The Daredevils issues No. 3 and No. 4 (March–April 1983).
- The 1987 comic book The New Mutants Annual No. 3 features a scene in which a global duel between Warlock and Impossible Man ruins the London shop and the car of founder Mike Lake, who is horrified at the damage.
- Landau, Luckman, and Lake, a fictional organisation appearing in Marvel Comics, is named for the original three founders.
- The New York store was featured in an issue of The Authority vol. 4, No. 2 (November 2008). When the eponymous superhero team ends up in the real world, they visit Forbidden Planet and discover comic books that feature them.
- In the foreword to the 2015 Artist's Proof Edition of The Walking Dead No. 1, editor Sean Mackiewicz states that he was first drawn to the 2003 debut issue of that series through the artwork of co-creator Tony Moore, when he discovered the issue at the Forbidden Planet store in Manhattan, commenting, "the old one on the southeast corner of 13th & Broadway".

=== In other media ===
- One of the potential flatmates interviewed in the 1994 feature film Shallow Grave prominently holds a Forbidden Planet carrier bag.
- The Forbidden Planet London Megastore was featured in the tenth series, episode six of the British TV series The Apprentice in which the contestants visit the store to pitch a board game idea to the store manager.
- In the 2011 fantasy novel Skulduggery Pleasant: Death Bringer, Darquesse crashes through the Dublin store's window and remarks, "A comic store. How fitting."
