= 2020 in comics =

Notable events of 2020 in comics. It includes any relevant comics-related events, deaths of notable comics-related people, conventions and first issues by title.

== Events ==
=== January ===
- January 20: Legendary comics writer René Goscinny receives a statue in Paris. He is the first comics artist to be honoured this way in the French capital.
- January 28: A cartoon by Niels Bo Bojesen in the Danish newspaper Jyllands-Posten causes a diplomatic incident with the Chinese embassy for depicting the Chinese flag, with its yellow stars depicting the coronavirus particles.
- January 29: Dutch comics artist Wasco wins the Stripschapprijs. On 8 February it is announced that Bas Schuddeboom and Kjell Knudde, editors of the comics encyclopedia website Comiclopedia, connected to the Amsterdam comics store Lambiek, win the P. Hans Frankfurther Prize.

=== February ===
- February 4: Belgian cartoonist Lectrr causes a diplomatic incident with the Association of Chinese Enterprises in Belgium and Luxemburg by drawing the Chinese flag and replacing the yellow stars with 'danger' symbol(s).
- February 23:
  - The final episode of Norm Feuti's Retail is published.
  - Chris Yambar and Randy Bish launch a revival of Richard F. Outcault's classic newspaper comic character The Yellow Kid, albeit in comic book format.

=== March ===
- March 23: Due to the COVID-19 pandemic lockdown Diamond Comic Distributors stops sending comics to retail shops until further notice. Issues of comics with United States release dates of April 1 or later, and with United Kingdom release dates of March 25 or later, will not be shipped until normal operations resume.
- March 28: The final daily episode of Bob Weber's Moose & Molly is published. The final Sunday episode appears on 5 April. On 17 October of the same year Weber dies.

=== April ===
- April 1: De Kiekeboes are from now on drawn digitally rather than by hand. Creator Merho passes his pencil on to his successors: Kristof Fagard and Steve Van Bael, though keeps writing the scripts.

=== May ===
- May 7: To support comics stores who had to close down several months due to the COVID-19 pandemic lockdown various Dutch and Flemish comics artists release a free collective comic book titled Striphelden versus Corona, which is handed out in stores to everybody who buys a comic for minimum 15 euro.
- May 20: For the first time since his retirement in 2002, Paul Geerts presents a new Suske en Wiske story, drawn by himself: De Preutse Prinses. The title was set to be presented in March, but due to the COVID-19 pandemic the release had to be postponed.

=== June ===
- June 5: DC Comics announces that they will discontinue their distribution through Diamond Comic Distributors and instead have their comics distributed through Penguin Random House, USC Comic Distributors and Lunar Distribution instead.
- June 10: At age 99 Al Jaffee retires from the comics industry. Mad Magazine releases a thematic special, which features his final fold-in.

=== July ===
- July 1: The second posthumous The Adventures of Nero story, De Toet van Tut, starts serialisation in Knack, scripted by Willy Linthout and drawn by Luc Cromheecke.
- July 13: The final episode of Doc and Raider is published. Three weeks later, creator Sean Martin dies from pancreatic cancer.
- July 26: The final episode of Jan Eliot's Stone Soup appears in print.

=== August ===
- August 29: An unfinished Suske en Wiske story by Willy Vandersteen, De Sonometer, is presented in a finished version, written by François Corteggiani and Dirk Stallaert. It is prepublished in De Telegraaf.

=== September ===
- September 2: In the Central Station of Brussels, Belgium, the ceiling fresco depicting The Smurfs, which was inaugurated in 2018, collapses due to a water leak.
- September 17: Belgian comics scholar Pascal Lefèvre receives an honorary doctorate at the University of Malmö, Sweden.
- September 22: Dutch cartoonist Len Munnik wins his second Inktspotprijs for Best Political Cartoon. The first time happened in 1996.

=== October ===
- October 2:
  - During the Stripdagen in Haarlem Herman Roozen is named the new Dutch Stripmaker des Vaderlands (Comics Laureate of the Netherlands).
  - During the Stripdagen in Haarlem Bas Schuddeboom and Kjell Knudde, writers and editors of Lambiek's comics encyclopedia Comiclopedia, receive the P. Hans Frankfurtherprijs.
- Johnny Sampson makes his first fold-in for Mad.

=== November ===
- November 29: Jan Godschalk and Ton Kooreman win the annual Bulletje en Boonestaakschaal.

=== December ===
- December 13: Frank von Hebel and Fred de Heij create a homage story to Pieter Kuhn's classic comic Kapitein Rob, which is serialized in Het Parool, 75 years after the character's debut in the paper. Since 1966 no official new stories of this series had been published.

== Deaths ==
=== January ===
- January 2: Bogusław Polch, Polish comics artist (Funky Koval, Wiedźmin), dies at age 78.
- January 7: Tobias Tak, Dutch comics artist (Gaboon, Zizmo the cat), dies at age 65.
- January 11: Steve Stiles, American comics artist (The Adventures of Professor Thintwhistle and His Incredible Aether Flyer, Xenozoic Tales), dies at age 76.
- January 14: Jacques Stoll, French animator and comics artist (Colonel Nightingale, Bing et Boing), dies at an unknown age.
- January 19: Pirana, Belgian cartoonist and comics artist (Mevrouw Dallemans), dies at age 72 from euthanasia.
- January 20: Wolfgang J. Fuchs, German author, historian (co-author of Anatomie eines Massenmediums and Comics-Handbuch with Reinhold Reitberger) and comic book translator, dies at age 74.
- January 23: Zsolt Richly, Hungarian comic artist and animator (comics based on his animated series A Kockásfülű nyúl), dies at age 78.
- January 25: Horst Alisch, German illustrator, animator and comics artist (Bürokrates, Sohn des Pedantes, Ali und Archibald, Emmy and Käpt'n Lütt), dies at age 94.
- January 30: Bill Canfield, American sports cartoonistst, dies at age 99.
- Specific date unknown: Raymond Larrett, aka Norman Dog, American illustrator and comics artist (Bad Habits), dies at an unknown age.

=== February ===
- February 3: Philippe Adamov, French illustrator, animator and comics artist (Seule au Monde, Le Vent des Dieux, Dayak, L'Impératrice Rouge, Le Malédiction de Zener, Dakota), dies at age 63.
- February 8: Victor Gorelick, American comic book editor (Archie Comics), dies at age 78.
- February 10: Claire Bretécher, French comics artist (Les Frustrés, Hector, Agrippine, Celullite) and editor (co-founder of L'Écho des Savanes), dies at age 79.
- February 12: Hubert Boulard aka Hubert, French comics writer (Le Legs de l'alchimiste, Miss Pas Touche, Beauté, Les Ogres-Dieux) and colorist, dies at age 49.
- February 21: Nick Cuti, American comics writer (E-Man, Michael Mauser, Captain Cosmos), editor, animator and artist (Moonchild), dies at age 75.
- Specific date unknown: Alice Schenker, American underground comix and poster publisher (Print Mint Press), dies at age 88.

=== March ===
- March 2:
  - Abdullah Turhan, Turkish comics artist (Uzun Kılıçlı Kahraman, Kara Murat, Tolga, Burak Bey), dies at age 87.
  - Suat Yalaz, Turkish comics artist (Karaoğlan), dies at age 88.
- March 4:
  - Helen Courtney, New Zealand cartoonist (made cartoons for Broadsheet), dies at age 67.
  - Frank McLaughlin, American comics artist (Judomaster, assisted The Heart of Juliet Jones, Brenda Starr, Reporter, Gil Thorp), dies at age 84.
- March 5: André Chéret, French comics artist (Rahan, Domino, Protéo, continued Bob Mallard), dies at age 82.
- March 9: Allen Bellman, American comics artist and one of the last living Golden Age of Comic Books artists (continued Captain America), dies at age 96.
- March 13: René Follet, Belgian illustrator and comics artist (Steve Steverin, continued Valhardi), dies at age 88.
- March 18: Erwin Drèze, Belgian comics artist (Les Aventures de Louis Valmont, assisted on Lefranc), dies at age 59 from a brain tumor.
- March 19: Roman Arámbula, Mexican animator and comics artist (Disney comics, continued the Mickey Mouse newspaper comic), dies at age 83.
- March 20:
  - François Dermaut, aka Franjack, French comics artist (Les Chemins de Malefosse, Souvenirs de Toussaint), dies at age 71.
  - Giovanni Romanini, Italian animator and comics artist (continued Kriminal, Satanik, Alan Ford, Martin Mystère, Disney comics), dies at age 75 from a heart attack.
- March 24:
  - Juan Padrón, Cuban animator and comics artist (Elpidio Valdés), dies at age 73.
  - Albert Uderzo, French comics artist (Jehan Pistolet, Oumpah-pah, Astérix, Tanguy et Laverdure), dies at age 92 from a heart attack.
- March 27:
  - Daniel Azulay, Brazilian TV host and comics artist (Capitão Sol, Capitão Cipó, Turma do Lambe-Lambe), dies at age 72 from COVID-19.
- March 30: Tom Gianni, American comic artist (An Empty Love Story), dies at age 60.
- March 31:
  - Emmanuel Malot, A.K.A. Malotruf, French comics artist (Contes des 1001 Vies - 7 Destins, L'Étoile Miraculeuse), dies at age 51 from COVID-19.
  - Valeer Peirsman, Belgian sculptor (sculpted many statues of comics characters, among others for the Comics Route in Middelkerke), dies at age 87.

=== April ===
- April 2: Juan Giménez, Argentine comics artist (Metabarons), dies at age 76 from COVID-19.
- April 4:
  - Dale Crain, American comics artist (archive editor of DC Comics, worked on Thor), dies at an unknown age.
  - Arnold Heertje, Dutch economist and comics writer (wrote De Geschiedenis van het Geld, illustrated by Peter de Smet), dies at age 86.
  - Rao Pingru, Chinese illustrator and comics artist (Our Story), dies at age 97.
- April 8: Mort Drucker, American comics artist, illustrator and caricaturist (the film and TV parodies in Mad Magazine, Benchley), dies at age 91.
- April 12: Albert Roch, aka Béoc, Belgian comics artist (Patrick, Le Petit Irlandais, Dudule), dies at age 90.
- April 16:
  - Gene Deitch, American animator, animated film director and comics artist (The Cat, Terr'ble Thompson, Maly Svet), dies at age 95.
  - Tonet Timmermans, Belgian illustrator and comics artist (Genoveva van Brabant), dies at age 94.
- April 26: Jean-Claude Pertuzé, French comics artist, dies at age 70.

=== May ===
- May 2:
  - Armando Huerta, Mexican-American illustrator, pin-up artist and comic artist (contributed to the Double Impact series), commits suicide at age 50.
  - Paul Sellers, British comic artist (Eb and Flo, Lancelittle, comics based on Roger Hargreaves' Mr. Men and Little Miss), dies at age 89.
- May 7: Richard Sala, American comics artist, illustrator and animator (The Chuckling Whatsit, Evil Eye), dies at age 65.
- May 10: Martin Pasko, Canadian-American comics writer (wrote for Superman, Batman, Wonder Woman, Metal Men, Star Trek comics), dies at age 61.
- May 12: Frank Bolle, American comics artist (Children's Tales, Debbie Deere, Quick Quiz, continued Winnie Winkle, The Heart of Juliet Jones and Apartment 3-G), dies at age 95.
- May 18: Jennifer Kisler, British comics artist (continued Rupert Bear), dies at age 84.
- May 21:
  - Mati Botezatu, Romanian comic artist, dies at age 68.
  - Lluís Juste De Nin, aka L'Esquerrà, El Zurdo, Spanish comics artist, caricaturist and illustrator (La Norma, Petant La Xerrada, ELS NIN), dies at age 74 or 75.
- May 29: Eric Schreurs, Dutch comics artist (Joop Klepzeiker, Dick van Bill), dies from heart failure at age 61.
- Specific date in May unknown:
  - Frank B. Johnson, American comics artist (Boner's Ark, Beany, Miss Caroline, Einstein, continued Bringing Up Father), dies at age 89.

=== June ===
- June 10: Murray Olderman, American sports cartoonist, dies at age 98.
- June 11: Dennis O'Neil, American comics writer (Marvel Comics, DC Comics, Charlton Comics), dies at age 81.
- June 24: Ralph Dunagin, American comics writer (The Middletons, continued Grin and Bear It, The Girls) and comics artist (Dunagin's People), dies at age 83.
- June 25: Joe Sinnott, American comics artist and inker (Marvel Comics), dies at age 93.
- June 26: Milton Glaser, American graphic designer (designed the logo for DC Comics between 1977 and 2005), dies at age 91.
- Specific date in June unknown: Brian Walker, British comics writer and artist (Mike's Bike, Boxatricks, Go, Granny, Go!, worked on I Spy, Scream Inn, The Smasher and Pop, Dick and Harry), dies at age 94.

=== July ===
- July 1: Marc Alberich Lluís, Spanish comics artist and animator (Don Pankracio, el Yayo Punk), dies at age 49.
- July 2: Jiro Kuwata, Japanese comics/manga artist (8 Man), dies at age 85.
- July 13: Carl Gafford, American comics colorist, dies at age 66.
- July 30–31: Concepció Zendrera Tomás, Catalan-Spanish comics translator (translator of The Adventures of Tintin into Catalan, inspired a biographical comic about her life, drawn by David Maynar), dies at age 100.

=== August ===
- August 3: Sean Martin, Canadian comics artist and graphic artist (Doc and Raider), dies at age 59 from pancreatic cancer.
- August 10: Laurent Vicomte, French comics artist (La Balade au Bout du Monde, Sasmira), dies at age 64.
- August 11: Edmond Kiraz, Egyptian-French comics artist (Line, Les Parisiennes, erotic cartoons in Playboy), dies at age 96.
- August 13: Harald Stricker, Brazilian illustrator, podcaster and comics artist (Independência ou Mortos), dies at age 47.
- August 14: Svetozar Obradović, Serbian novelist, radio scriptwriter and comics writer (Lieutenant Tara, Cat Claw, Kobra), dies at age 69.
- August 17: Claude Laverdure, Belgian comics artist (assistant of Edouard Aidans and Chris Lamquet, drew a biographical comic about Antoine de Saint-Exupéry), dies at age 73.
- August 23:
  - André-Paul Duchâteau, Belgian novelist, dramatist, radio and TV scriptwriter and comics writer (Chick Bill, Ric Hochet), dies at age 95.
  - Rolf Gohs, Swedish comic creator and cover artist (Fantomen, Mystika 2:an, Blodsmak), dies at age 86.

=== September ===
- September 1: Jimmy Janes, American comics artist (Legion of Super-Heroes), dies at age 73.
- September 6: Bob Fujitani, American comics artist (Judge Wright, continued Rip Kirby), dies at age 98.
- September 13: Bruno Madaule, French comics artist (Eglantine et Diégo, Les Givrés, Les Blagues Suisses, Les Winners), dies at age 49 from cancer.
- September 14: Fer, Spanish comics artist (Puticlub, El Urelio, Historias Fermosas), dies at age 71.
- September 20: John Allen, American cartoonist (Undissolved Mysteries), dies from brain cancer at an unknown age.
- September 21: Ron Cobb, American cartoonist, animator, film set designer, TV director and scriptwriter, dies at age 83.
- September 30: Quino, Argentine comics artist (Mafalda), dies at age 88.

=== October ===
- October 11: Gerald Gardner, American screenwriter and comics writer (Miss Caroline), dies at age 91.
- October 13: Yves Thos, French painter and illustrator (illustrated magazine covers for Pilote and for comic book album covers of series like Redbeard and Tanguy et Laverdure), dies at age 85.
- October 17: Bob Weber Sr., American comics artist (Moose & Molly, assisted on Winthrop) and writer (Barney Google and Snuffy Smith), dies at age 86.
- October 20: Alex Varenne, French comics writer and artist (Ardeur, Erma Jaguar), dies at age 81.
- October 22: Richard Lupoff, aka Dick Lupoff, American novelist, writer and comics writer (The Adventures of Professor Thintwhistle and His Incredible Aether Flyer), dies at age 85.
- October 26: Jean-Pierre Autheman, French comics artist (Condor, Vic Valence, Zip Zap), dies at age 73.
- October 28: Ward Zwart, Belgian comics artist (Wolven, Ik Kom van Ver Maar Blijf Niet Te Lang), dies at age 35.

=== November ===
- November 4: Pascal Somon, French illustrator and comics artist (convicted for making illegal Tintin parodies), dies at age 60.
- November 6: Miguel Quesada Cerdán, Spanish comic artist (Kormax, Pacho Dinamite, continued Pantera Negra), dies at age 77.
- November 8: Max Lenvers, French comics artist (continued Jacques Flash), dies at age 87.
- November 9: Ro Marcenaro, Swiss-Italian animator and comics artist (made a comics version of The Communist Manifesto), dies at age 83.
- November 12: Piem, French cartoonist (Monsieur Pépin, Turlupin), dies at age 97.
- November 13: Emil V. Abrahamian, American comics artist (Stumpy Stumbler, The Spacers, Space Shots, Impressions, Animal Chatter, The Sports File, Endangered Animals and Their Environment), dies at age 94.
- November 17: Arco van Os, Dutch editor/chief editor of the comics magazine Stripschrift, publisher of the company Stripstift, festival director of De Stripdagen comics festival (2005-2014), dies at age 58 from a heart attack.
- November 20:
  - Ivo Pavone, Italian comics artist (continued Sergeant Kirk), dies at age 91.
  - Takao Yaguchi, Japanese manga artist (Fisherman Sanpei), dies at age 81.
- November 24, Yaroslav Horak, Australian comics artist (The Mask, Jet Fury, continued James Bond), dies at age 93.
- Specific date in November unknown: Jon Davis, British illustrator and comics artist (comics based on Thunderbirds), dies at an unknown age.

=== December ===
- December 2: Richard Corben, American animator, illustrator, comics writer, comics artist (Rolf, Den, Bloodstar, Rip in Time) and colorist, dies at age 80.
- December 7: Rubens Cordeiro, Brazilian comic artist (Mystiko, Nádia, Homem Fera, continued Zorro), dies at age 86.
- December 10: Karel Driesen, Belgian comics events organizer (Stripcentrum Driesen), dies at age 73 from COVID-21.
- December 11: Malik, Belgian comics artist (Archie Cash, Cupidon), dies at age 72 in a house fire.
- December 15: Alem Ćurin, Croatian comics artist (Luna Moth vs. The Conformist, Egostriper), dies at age 67.
- December 17: Doug Crane, American comics artist (worked on Tower Comics, Archie Comics, DC Comics) and animator, dies at age 85.
- December 21: Francisco Pérez Espinosa, A.K.A. Kito, Spanish comic artist (Nadine, Claudine et leur Papa), dies at age 82 or 83.
- December 28: Arthur Berckmans, A.K.A. Berck, Belgian comics artist (Sammy, Strapontin, Rataplan, De Familie Nopkes, De Donderpadjes, Lowietje), dies at age 91.

== Exhibitions ==
- February 15–April 18: "Still... Racism in America: A Retrospective in Cartoons" (Medialia Gallery, New York City) — 100+ cartoons by the African American father-daughter cartoonists Brumsic Brandon Jr. and Barbara Brandon-Croft
- April–October 24: "Women in Comics: Looking Forward, Looking Back" (Society of Illustrators, New York City) — curated by Trina Robbins and Kim Munson; artists include Lynda Barry, Colleen Doran, Trinidad Escobar, Joyce Farmer, Margot Ferrick, Emil Ferris, Mary Fleener, Ebony Flowers, Noel Franklin, Lee Marrs, Alitha Martinez, Barbara "Willy" Mendes, Summer Pierre, Afua Richardson, Fiona Smyth, Ann Telnaes, Carol Tyler, Jen Wang, Tillie Walden, Gabrielle Bell, and Kriota Willberg.

== Conventions ==
=== January ===
- January 11–12: Long Beach Comic Expo, Long Beach, California
- January 17–19: Albuquerque Comic Con, Albuquerque, New Mexico
- January 19: Pasadena Comic Con, Pasadena, California
- January 25: FrankfortCon, Frankfort, Kentucky
- January 25–26: CalComicCon, Costa Mesa, California

=== February ===
- February 2: Comic Book and More Show, Laurel, Maryland
- February 8
  - Charlotte Mini Con, Charlotte, North Carolina
  - Big Lick Comic Con, Roanoke, Virginia
- February 8–9: FanfaireNYC, New York City, New York
- February 9: Simi Valley Toy and Comic Fest, Simi Valley, California
- February 15: Imperial Valley Comic Con, El Centro, California
- February 22–23
  - Alaska Comicon, Fairbanks, Alaska
  - Comic Con Brussels, Brussels, Belgium
- February 23: The Miami Con, Miami, Florida
- February 28-March 1:
  - Chicago Comic & Entertainment Expo (Chicago, Illinois)
  - Pensacon, Pensacola, Florida
- February 29-March 1
  - Lubbock-Con, Lubbock, Texas
  - Fayetteville, Arkansas Comic Show, Fayetteville, Arkansas

=== March ===
- March 1: Buckeye Comic Con, Columbus, Ohio
- March 6–8: Comic Con Liverpool, Liverpool, England, United Kingdom
- March 7: ClarksvilleCon, Clarksville, Tennessee
- March 7–8: Tupelo Con, Tupelo, Mississippi
- March 12–15: Emerald City Comic Con, Seattle, Washington — RESCHEDULED AND THEN CANCELLED DUE TO COVID-19 PANDEMIC
- March 13–15
  - NorthEast Comicon and Collectibles Extravaganza, Boxborough, Massachusetts
  - La Mole Convention, Centro Citibanamex, Mexico City
- March 14–15: Quad Cities Comic Con, Rock Island, Illinois
- March 15: Cleveland Comic Book and Nostalgia Show, Westlake, Ohio
- March 20–22
  - Collective Con, Jacksonville, Florida
  - Planet Comicon Kansas City, Kansas City, Missouri
- March 21–22: Four State Comic-Con, Hagerstown, Maryland
- March 26–28: Lexington Comic and Toy Convention, Lexington, Kentucky
- March 27–29
  - Colorado Comic Con, Colorado Springs, Colorado
  - Fan Expo Dallas (Dallas, Texas) — POSTPONED to June and then CANCELLED DUE TO COVID-19 PANDEMIC
  - Supernova Comic Con & Gaming, Broadbeach, Queensland, Australia
- March 28: FLUKE Mini-Comics & Zine Festival (Athens, Georgia) — POSTPONED to September and then CANCELLED DUE TO COVID-19 PANDEMIC

=== April ===
- April 3–5
  - Great Philadelphia Comic Con, Oaks, Pennsylvania
  - Roanoke Valley Comicon, Salem, Virginia
- April 4
  - Boston Comics in Color Festival, Boston, Massachusetts
  - Gem State Comic-Con, Boise, Idaho
- April 4–5
  - MoCCA Arts Festival, New York City, New York — CANCELLED DUE TO COVID-19 PANDEMIC
  - Hill Country Comicon, New Braunfels, Texas
  - Big Apple Comic Con, New York City, New York — CANCELLED DUE TO COVID-19 PANDEMIC
- April 5: Comic Book and More Show, Hunt Valley, Maryland
- April 10–12:
  - Indiana Comic Con, Indianapolis
  - WonderCon (Anaheim, California) — CANCELLED DUE TO COVID-19 PANDEMIC
- April 11: Wilmington Geek Expo, Wilmington, North Carolina
- April 16–19: MegaCon I (Orlando, Florida) — CANCELLED DUE TO COVID-19 PANDEMIC
- April 17–19: El Paso Comic Con, El Paso, Texas
- April 24–26: South Texas Comic Con, McAllen, Texas
- April 25: Little Giant Old School Comics Show, Concord, New Hampshire
- April 25–26
  - Fayetteville Comic-Con, Fayetteville, North Carolina
  - Arctic Comic-Con, Anchorage, Alaska
  - Wales Comic-Con, Telford, United Kingdom
- April 26: Canton Toy, Comic Book, and Nostalgia Convention, North Canton, Ohio

=== May ===
- May 1–3: Awesome Con, D.C., Washington, D.C. — RESCHEDULED AND THEN CANCELLED DUE TO COVID-19 PANDEMIC
- May 5–10: Florida Supercon, Miami Beach Convention Center — RESCHEDULED AND THEN CANCELLED DUE TO COVID-19 PANDEMIC
- May 9–10
  - Savannah Comic-Con, Savannah, Georgia
  - Hudson Valley Comic Con, Poughkeepsie, New York
  - Momento Con, Pittsburgh
- May 15–17:
  - East Coast Comicon, Secaucus, New Jersey — CANCELLED DUE TO COVID-19 PANDEMIC
  - Motor City Comic Con (Detroit, Michigan) — CANCELLED DUE TO COVID-19 PANDEMIC
- May 16: SNH Comic bash, Nashua, New Hampshire
- May 16–17
  - Tidewater Comicon, Virginia Beach, Virginia
  - Lake Como Comic Art Festival, Cernobbio, Lombardy, Italy
  - Comicon Revolution, Ontario, California
- May 17: Cottage Country Con, Orillia, Ontario, Canada
- May 21–24: Phoenix Fan Fusion, Phoenix, Arizona — CANCELLED DUE TO COVID-19 PANDEMIC
- May 22–24
  - Comicpalooza, Houston — CANCELLED DUE TO COVID-19 PANDEMIC
  - Cherry City Comicon, Salem, Oregon
- May 23: Lake County Pop Culture Con, Grayslake, Illinois
- May 23–25: Puerto Rico Comic Con, San Juan, Puerto Rico
- May 30–31: 3 Rivers Comicon, Homestead, Pennsylvania

=== June ===
- June 4–7: MegaCon II (Orlando, Florida) — CANCELLED DUE TO COVID-19 PANDEMIC
- June 5–7: Niagara Falls Comicon, Niagara Falls, Ontario
- June 13–14: Chicago Alternative Comics Expo (CAKE) (Chicago, Illinois) — CANCELED DUE TO COVID-19 PANDEMIC
- June 19–21:
  - HeroesCon, Charlotte, North Carolina — CANCELLED DUE TO COVID-19 PANDEMIC
  - Supernova Comicon & Gaming, Sydney, New South Wales, Australia
- June 20–21: Greater Austin Comic Con, Austin, Texas
- June 26–28: Supernova Comicon & Gaming, Perth, Western Australia

=== July ===
- July 3–5
  - NorthEast Comicon and Collectibles Extravaganza, Boxborough, Massachusetts
  - Fan Expo Denver, Denver — RESCHEDULED and then CANCELLED DUE TO COVID-19 PANDEMIC
- July 10–12
  - Corpus Christi Comic-Con, Robstown, Texas
  - Tampa Bay Comic Con, Tampa Convention Center, Tampa, Florida
- July 11: ECBACC (Philadelphia, Pennsylvania) — IN-PERSON EVENT CANCELLED DUE TO COVID-19; one-day virtual event held on this date
- July 11–12: Small Press and Alternative Comics Expo (S.P.A.C.E.) — CANCELLED DUE TO COVID-19 PANDEMIC
- July 22–26: San Diego Comic-Con (San Diego, California) — CANCELLED DUE TO COVID-19 PANDEMIC
- July 30–August 2: GalaxyCon Raleigh (Raleigh, North Carolina) — RESCHEDULED AND THEN CANCELLED DUE TO COVID-19 PANDEMIC
- July 31-August 2: Atlanta Comic-Con, Atlanta

=== August ===
- August 1: Plastic City Comic Con, Fitchburg, Massachusetts
- August 1–2: Bell County Comic-Con, Belton, Texas
- August 7–9: Fan Expo Boston (Boston, Massachusetts) — CANCELLED DUE TO COVID-19 PANDEMIC

Sun Mar 15, 2020 9:15pm

- August 14–16: TERRIFICon, Uncasville, Connecticut
- August 15–16: Flame Con (New York City) — CANCELLED DUE TO COVID-19 PANDEMIC
- August 20–23: Wizard World Chicago (Rosemont, Illinois) — CANCELLED DUE TO COVID-19 PANDEMIC
- August 21–23: New Mexico Comic Expo, Albuquerque, New Mexico
- August 28–30: Keystone Comicon: Philadelphia

=== September ===
- September 3–7: Dragon Con (Atlanta, Georgia) — IN-PERSON EVENT CANCELLED DUE TO COVID-19 PANDEMIC; rescheduled for the same dates as a virtual event
- September 11–13: Rose City Comic Con (Portland, Oregon) — CANCELLED DUE TO COVID-19 PANDEMIC
- September 12–13: Small Press Expo (Bethesda, Maryland) — CANCELLED DUE TO COVID-19 PANDEMIC; Ignatz Awards ceremony held online
- September 17–19: FanX (Salt Lake City, Utah) — CANCELLED DUE TO COVID-19 PANDEMIC
- September 18–20: Big Texas Comicon (San Antonio, Texas) — CANCELLED DUE TO COVID-19 PANDEMIC
- September 19: Monroe Pop Fest, Monroe, Michigan
- September 19–20
  - Granite State Comicon, Manchester, New Hampshire
  - Harrisburg Comic & Pop Con, Harrisburg, Pennsylvania
- September 25–27: L.A. Comic Con — RESCHEDULED to December and then CANCELLED DUE TO COVID-19 PANDEMIC

=== October ===
- October: STAPLE! (Austin, Texas) — CANCELLED DUE TO COVID-19 PANDEMIC
- October 1–4: Cartoon Crossroads Columbus (Columbus, Ohio) — IN-PERSON EVENT CANCELLED DUE TO COVID-19 PANDEMIC; rescheduled for the same dates as a virtual event
- October 3: SNH Comic bash, Nashua, New Hampshire
- October 8–11: New York Comic Con (New York City) — IN-PERSON EVENT CANCELLED DUE TO COVID-19 PANDEMIC; rescheduled for the same dates as a virtual event called "New York Comic Con X MCM Comic Con Metaverse"
- October 16–18: SiliCon (San Jose, California) — IN-PERSON EVENT CANCELLED DUE TO COVID-19 PANDEMIC; rescheduled for the same dates as a virtual event
- October 17–18
  - Fayetteville Comic-Con, Fayetteville, North Carolina
  - Massachusetts Independent Comics Expo [MICE] (University Hall, Lesley University, Cambridge, Massachusetts)— IN-PERSON EVENT CANCELLED DUE TO COVID-19 PANDEMIC; rescheduled as a virtual convention held over the course of a couple of weekends in October
- October 23–25: Baltimore Comic-Con (Baltimore, Maryland) — IN-PERSON EVENT CANCELLED DUE TO COVID-19 PANDEMIC; rescheduled for the same dates as a virtual event
- October 31-November 1: Vermont Fan Fest, Burlington, Vermont

=== November ===
- Comic Arts Brooklyn (Brooklyn, New York) — CANCELLED DUE TO COVID-19 PANDEMIC
- November 6–8: Rhode Island Comic Con (Providence, Rhode Island) — CANCELLED DUE TO COVID-19 PANDEMIC
- November 7–8: Akron Comicon, Cuyahoga Falls, Ohio
- November 27–29: NorthEast Comicon and Collectibles Extravaganza, Boxborough, Massachusetts

=== December ===
- Comic Arts Los Angeles (Los Angeles, California) — CANCELLED DUE TO COVID-19 PANDEMIC
