= 2013 in comics =

Notable events of 2013 in comics. It includes any relevant comics-related events, deaths of notable comics-related people, conventions and first issues by title. For an overview of the year in Japanese comics, see 2013 in manga.

== Events ==
=== January ===
- January 15: Dutch cartoonist Pieter Geenen wins the Inktspotprijs for Best Political Cartoon.

=== March ===
- March 3: After 30 years of continuous publication, Philippe Geluck's Le Chat comes to an end.
- March 8: The first new Tom Poes story after creator Marten Toonder's death in 2005, Tom Poes en de Pas-Kaart, drawn by Dick Matena, starts serialisation in the magazine VertrekNL.
- March 9–10: During the Stripdagen in Haarlem, Paul Teng receives the Stripschapprijs. The P. Hans Frankfurtherprijs is awarded to Comic House. The Bulletje en Boonestaakschaal goes to Richard's Studio.
- March 26: Dupuis buys Marsu Productions.

=== April ===
- April 26: Dutch comic artist Jan van Haasteren is knighted in the Order of Orange Nassau.

=== May ===
- May 16 - July 10: Jan Hoet and politician Dany Vandenbossche organize the exhibition De Wereld van de Strips in Originelen (The World of Comics in Originals) on display in the Loketten of the Flemish Parliament in Brussels. Original pages by various Belgian comics artists are exhibited. However, the exhibition causes controversy when politician Jan Peumans objects to a French-language speech balloon on the promotional poster and asks for its removal. The speech is then blanked, which results in protest from various people, including cartoonist Kamagurka who asks for the removal of his cartoons from the expo.

=== July ===
- July 12: Albert Uderzo is named Officer in the Légion d'Honneur.

=== August ===
- August 6: Iranian cartoonist Ali Dorani, better known under his pseudonym Eaten Fish, is imprisoned in a detention camp at Christmas Island. In January 2014 he is incarcerated to another camp, Manus Island, where he stays until late 2017. During his five-year imprisonment he starts making cartoons and comics and have them smuggled outside the prison, which brings international attention to his case.
- August 12: Dutch comic writer and artist Thom Roep is knighted in the Order of Orange Nassau.

=== September ===
- September 4: Sonic the Hedgehog #252, marking the revised continuity where the Second-Genesis Wave is retconned. This was due to a legal settlement was made after writer Ken Penders was discharged from Archie Comics after facing lawsuits against Sega. Because of this, the characters that were created by Penders were not allowed in the subsequent comics, nor any of the stories written by him were to be reprinted.
- September 13: Patrick J. Marrin launches a long-running celebrity comic about Pope Francis, titled Francis. It will run until 2025.

=== December ===
- Specific date unknown: In Brussels, during renovation works in the SLFP building, drawings by André Franquin, Peyo, Jean Roba, Victor Hubinon, Mitacq,... are discovered on a wall, hidden behind wall paper layers.

=== Specific date unknown ===
- Rao Pingru's Our Story: A Memoir of Love and Life in China is published. He is 90–91 years old, which makes him the oldest comics artist to ever make his debut.
- Syrian cartoonist Akram Raslan is tortured to death in a government detention center.

== Deaths ==
=== January ===
- January 30: Vahan Shirvanian, American cartoonist and comics artist (No Comment), dies at age 87.

=== February ===
- February 3: Pierre Defoux, Belgian priest, painter, illustrator, sculptor, lattice window maker and comics artist (Xavier, Raconté Par Le Ménestrel), dies at age 88.
- February 9:
  - Emilio Frejo Abregón, Spanish comics artist (Osito, Jaimito), dies at age 81.
  - Félix Molinari, French comics artist (Garry, Super Boy, Tora), dies at age 80.
- February 13: Bill Fugate, American comics artist (Disney comics, Thunder Girl, Mighty Man, Super Frankenstein), dies at age 58.
- February 16: Harald Siepermann, German comics artist and animator (Alfred Jodocus Kwak), dies at age 50.
- February 21: Scott Clark, American comics artist (worked for Wildstorm, Marvel Comics, Aspen Comics, DC Comics), dies at an unknown age.
- February 23: Maurice Rosy, Belgian children's book illustrator, comics writer (Tif et Tondu, Bobo, Attila, Spirou et Fantasio, Boule et Bill, Max l'Explorateur) and artistic director for Spirou between 1956 and 1973, dies at age 85.

=== March ===
- March 7: Didier Comès, Belgian comics artist (Silence, L'Ombre du Corbeau), dies at age 70.
- March 7: Damiano Damiani, Italian film director and comics artist (Mike Lazy, Pat La Rocca), dies at age 90.
- March 10: André Veltkamp, Dutch comics artist (Het Eiland Bicyclopia, Ralf), dies at age 67.
- March 12: André Rey, French comic artist (worked for the Atelier Chott and publishing house Impéria, mostly on western comics), dies at age 89.
- March 15: Jim Unwin, American comics artist and illustrator (co-creator of Little Sandy Sleighfoot), dies at age 83.
- March 18: Irmtraut Winkler-Wittig, German illustrator and comic artist (worked on Abrafaxe), dies at age 79.
- March 27: Jean Mahaux, aka Mao, Belgian comic artist (Finemouche et Fiasco, Douaniers Lapoire et Lastuce, Fortuné, Celestino), dies at age 78 or 79.
- March 28: Manuel García Ferré, Argentine cartoonist and animator (Pi Pío, Anteojito, Hijitus), dies at age 83.
- March 31: Bob Clarke, American illustrator and comics artist (Ripley's Believe It or Not, Mad, continued Spy vs. Spy), dies at age 87 from pneumonia.
- Specific date in March unknown: Helmut Zielke, German painter and comics artist, dies at age 74 or 75.

=== April ===
- April 1: Christian Mathelot, French comics artist (made various realistically drawn comics), dies at age 89.
- April 2: Fred, French comics artist (Philémon), dies at age 82.
- April 4: Carmine Infantino, American comics artist and editor (Detective Comics, Flash, Showcase), dies at age 87.
- April 27: Jesse Santos, Filipino comics artist (Kidlat, DI 13, Dagar the Invincible, Tragg and the Sky Gods), dies at age 84.

=== May ===
- May 3: Dan Adkins, American illustrator and comics artist (worked for various comics companies drawing sciencefiction stories), dies at age 76.
- May 4: Rubén Lara Romero, Mexican comics artist (Fantômas, la Amenaza Elegante), dies at age 78 or 79.
- May 16:
  - Roger Chevallier, aka Kline, French comics artist (Davy Crockett, Kaza le Martien, Loup Noir), dies at age 91.
  - Fred Funcken, Belgian comics artist and writer (Le Chevalier Blanc, Harald le Viking, Jack Diamond, Lieutenant Burton, Capitan and Doc Silver), dies at age 91.

=== June ===
- June 14: Manuel Zatarain, aka Zata, Spanish comics artist (El Capitan Martin de la Patrulla de los Diamantes, Goyo y Nico, Quique Banderas), dies at age 84 or 85.
- June 19: Kim Thompson, Danish-American comics editor, translator and publisher (vice-president of Fantagraphics Books), dies at age 56 from lung cancer.

=== July ===
- July 7: Louis Glanzman, American comics artist (Air Man, Amazing Man, The Shark, Dopey Danny Day, Blue Fire), dies at age 91.
- July 11: Percy Eaglehurst, Chilean comics artist (Pepe Antártico), dies at age 91.
- July 18: Gerrit Stapel, Dutch comics artist (Huon de Neveling), dies at age 92.
- July 28: Pierre Frisano, French comics artist (made realistic comics), dies at age 79.

=== August ===
- August 6: Stan Lynde, American comics artist (Rick O'Shay, Latigo, Grass Roots, Chief Sly Fox, Rovar Bob), dies at age 81 from cancer.
- August 8: Derek Hockridge, British translator (co-translator of Astérix), dies at age 78 or 79.
- August 26: Louis Haché, Belgian comic artist (Bob Francval et Djinn, L'Aventures des Belges/België in Beeld), dies at age 90 or 91.
- Specific date in August unknown: René Mazyn, French comics artist (Kid Franky, Monster Hôtel, continued Pif le chien), dies at age 53.

=== September ===
- September 3: José Ramón Larraz, Spanish film director and comics artist (Paul Foran), dies at age 83 or 84.
- September 7: Pete Hoffman, American comics artist (ghosted Steve Roper and Mike Nomad, created Jeff Cobb and Why We Say), dies at age 94 from a heart attack.
- September 24: Jacques Arbeau, French comics artist (continued Brik, L'Espiègle Lili and Les Pieds Nickelés), dies at age 86. .
- September 26: Rony Heirman, Belgian photographer (made comics together with museum curator Jan Hoet), dies at age 77.
- September 28: Friso Henstra, Dutch illustrator and comics artist (Olidin), dies at age 85.
- September 30: Roy Peterson, Canadian cartoonist, dies at age 77 from Parkinson's disease.

=== October ===
- October 13: Takashi Yanase, Japanese manga artist (Anpanman), dies at age 94.
- October 15: George Olesen, American comics artist (continued The Phantom), dies at age 88.
- October 21:
  - José Luis Beltrán Coscojuela, aka Tran, Beltrán, Koski and Tranis, Spanish comics artist and animator (Constancio Plurilópez, worked for Rolf Kauka), dies at age 82.
  - Rune T. Kidde, Danish writer, playwright, folk musician, poet, radio presenter and comics artist (Blomstrende Spaghetti), dies at age 46.
- October 22: Yanwari Kazama, Japanese manga artist (Taberemasen, Pochi Kyokudo), dies at age 36 from liver failure.
- October 27: Rolf De Ryck, Belgian teacher and writer (wrote the bibliography guide Willy Vandersteen, Van Kitty Inno tot De Geuzen), dies at age 57 from a heart attack.
- October 30: Renato Canini, Brazilian comics artist (Dr. Fraud, Kactus Kid, Tibica, Zé Candango, Disney comics, José Carioca), dies at age 77.

=== November ===
- November 3: Nick Cardy, American comics writer and artist (Lady Luck, worked on Tarzan, Tomahawk, Aquaman, Teen Titans, assisted on Casey Ruggles) and advertising illustrator, dies at age 93.
- November 7: Joey Manley, American webcomics publisher (founder of Modern Tales), dies at age 48 from pneumonia.
- November 11: Pieter van Oudheusden, Dutch novelist and comics writer (worked with Jeroen Janssen, wrote Klein Suske en Wiske), dies of a brain tumor at age 56.
- November 23: Solveig Muren Sanden, Norwegian illustrator and comics artist (continued Tuss og Troll and Smørbukk), dies at age 95.
- November 25: Al Plastino, American comic book artist (Superman, co-creator of Supergirl, Brainiac, and the Legion of Super-Heroes), dies at age 91.
- November 26: Joan Nebot, Spanish comics artist (Angelina, Yolanda), dies at age 80 or 81.

=== December ===
- December 4: Charles Grigg, British comics artist (Foxy, Splodge, continued Korky the Cat and Desperate Dan), dies at age 97.
- December 6: Abel Romero, Chilean comics artist (Eos Errante, Kom igen, Stéfan!), dies at age 85.
- December 23: José Ortiz, Spanish comic artist (Caroline Baker, Barrister at Law), dies aged 81.
- December 25: Pierre Wininger, French comics artist (Victor Billetdoux, Nicéphore Vaucanson, Terminus Crusoé), dies at age 63.
- December 26: Harold Whitaker, British animator and comics artist (comic strip adaptation of Animal Farm), dies at age 83.
- December 28: Martial, French comics artist (Sylvie, Tony Laflamme, Famille Bottafoin), dies at age 88.

=== Specific date unknown ===
- Bi Keguan, Chinese comics artist, dies at age 81 or 82.
- Mario Sbattella, Italian comics artist (Disney comics, Hanna-Barbera comics, comics starring Felix the Cat and Popeye), dies at age 82 or 83.

== Exhibitions ==
- May 16–31: "Image Duplicator" (Orbital Comics, London, England, U.K.) — an exhibition of cartoonists "re-appropriating the works of Roy Lichtenstein, tracking them back to their original source material and then creating a new comic book image that credits the original artist," curated by Rian Hughes and Jason Atomic. Cartoonists featured in the show include Dave Gibbons, Rian Hughes, Salgood Sam, Steven Cook, Howard Chaykin, Carl Flint, Betty Boolean, Mark Blamire, Tony Abruzzo, Jason Atomic, and David Leach.

== Conventions ==
- January 31–February 3: Angouleme International Comics Festival (Angouleme, France)
- March 1–3: Emerald City Comicon (Washington State Convention Center, Seattle, Washington)
- March 2–3: STAPLE! (Austin, Texas)
- March 15–17: MegaCon (Orange County Convention Center, Orlando, Florida) – scheduled guests include Ed McGuinness, Mark Bagley, Frank Cho, Bob Layton, Mike Perkins, Michael Lark, Neal Adams, Mark Waid, Chris Claremont, Mike Choi, Andrew Robinson, Steve Epting, Andy Price, Doug Sneyd, José Delbo, Matteo Scalera, Steve McNiven, Michael Atiyeh, Jimmy Cheung, George Pérez, Gail Simone, Mike McKone, Dave Johnson, Dan Panosian, Brian Pulido, Brandon Peterson, Amanda Conner, Jimmy Palmiotti, Billy Tucci, Georges Jeanty, Tim Townsend, and Craig Boldman
- March 22–24: Fabletown and Beyond, Mayo Civic Center (Rochester, Minnesota) — organized by Bill Willingham; guest of honor Mark Buckingham; other guests include Gene Ha, Mike Carey, Matt Sturges, Peter Gross, Kurt Busiek, Anthony Del Col, Shelly Bond, Adam Hughes, Chrissie Zullo, and Lauren Beukes.
- March 22–24: Wizard World St Louis (America's Center, St Louis, Missouri) - scheduled guests include Cullen Bunn, Jorge Molina, Tyler Kirkham, and Matt Kindt
- March 29–31: WonderCon (Anaheim Convention Center, Anaheim, California)
- March 30: Asbury Park Comic Con (Convention Hall, Asbury Park, New Jersey) — official guests include Al Jaffee, Michael E. Uslan, Herb Trimpe, Jamal Igle, Allen Bellman, Don McGregor, Jay Lynch, Rudy Nebres, John Holmstrom, Evan Dorkin, and Bob Camp.
- April 5–7: Steel City Con (Monroeville Convention Center, Monroeville, Pennsylvania) — guests include David Prowse, Karen Allen, Kevin Sorbo, Madison Lintz, Dawn Wells, Cristina Vee
- April 6: FLUKE Mini-Comics & Zine Festival (40 Watt, Athens, Georgia)
- April 6–7: MoCCA Festival (69th Regiment Armory, New York City)
- April 13–14: Small Press and Alternative Comics Expo (Ramada Plaza Hotel & Conference Center, Columbus, Ohio)
- April 13: New York Comic Book Marketplace (Penn Plaza Pavilion, New York City)
- April 20: Comica Comiket (Spring) (Central Saint Martins, University of the Arts London, England) — participants in the Drawing Parade included Oliver East, Gary Northfield, Neill Cameron, Dan Berry, and Frazer Irving
- April 26–28: C2E2 (McCormick Place Complex, Chicago, Illinois)
- April 27–29: Stumptown Comics Fest (Oregon Convention Center, Portland, Oregon) — 10th annual edition; goes on hiatus after event
- May 11–12: Comic Expo (Brunel Old Station, Bristol, UK) — 2,500 attendees; guests include Ian Churchill, Ian Gibson, Boo Cook, Mark Buckingham, Ben Oliver, and Lee Garbett
- May 11–12: Toronto Comic Arts Festival (Toronto Reference Library, Toronto, Canada) — guests include Bill Amend, David B., Chester Brown, Boulet, Ivan Brunetti, Glyn Dillon, Lisa Hanawalt, Gilbert Hernandez, Jaime Hernandez, Chip Kidd, Michael Kupperman, Josh Neufeld, Bryan Lee O'Malley, Ulli Lust, Taiyo Matsumoto, Rutu Modan, Françoise Mouly, Frederik Peeters, Paul Pope, Michel Rabagliati, Seth, Dash Shaw, Art Spiegelman, Gengoroh Tagame, Raina Telgemeier, Maurice Vellekoop
- May 17–19: Dallas Comic Con (Irving Convention Center, Las Colinas, Irving, Texas)
- May 17–19: Motor City Comic Con (Suburban Collection Showplace, Novi, Michigan) – scheduled guests include George Pérez, Jim Calfiore, Matthew Clark, Greg Horn, David Lloyd, Mark McKenna, Mike McKone, Tom Raney, Andy Suriano, and Charles Paul Wilson III
- May 17–18: East Coast Black Age of Comics Convention (Enterprise Center, Philadelphia, Pennsylvania) — presentation of the Glyph Comics Awards
- May 23-25: International Comic Arts Forum (University of Oregon, White Stag Building, Portland, Oregon) — guests include Gabriel Bá & Fábio Moon, Dmitry Yakovlev, Ville Hänninen & Tommi Musturi, Brian Michael Bendis, Kelly Sue DeConnick, Matt Fraction, Megan Kelso, Greg Rucka, and T. Edward Bak
- May 23–26: Phoenix Comicon (Phoenix Convention Center, Phoenix, Arizona)
- June 7–9: Heroes Convention (Charlotte Convention Center, Charlotte, North Carolina) — guests include Jason Aaron, Bob Almond, Jim Amash, Peter Bagge, Mitch Breitweiser, Elizabeth Breitweiser, Mark Brooks, Richard Case, Becky Cloonan, Jeremy Dale, Michael Dooney, Steve Epting, Tom Fowler, Matt Fraction, Francesco Francavilla, Rob Guillory, Cully Hamner, Scott Hampton, Dustin Harbin, Tony Harris, Jeremy Haun, Adam Hughes, Jamal Igle, Matt Kindt, Jason Latour, John Layman, Tom Lyle, Paul Maybury, Bob McLeod, Jorge Molina, Sean Gordon Murphy, B. Clay Moore, Ted Naifeh, David Petersen, Brandon Peterson, Ed Piskor, Eric Powell, Tom Raney, Paolo Rivera, Don Rosa, Greg Rucka, Jim Rugg, Tim Sale, Tom Scioli, Charles Soule, Matthew Southworth, Joe Staton, Brian Stelfreeze, Arthur Suydam, Marcio Takara, Philip Tan, Ben Templesmith, Tim Townsend, Cory Walker, Lee Weeks, and Brett Weldele
- June 15–16: Chicago Alternative Comics Expo [CAKE] (Center on Halsted, Chicago, Illinois) — special guests: Chris Ware, Kim Deitch, Phoebe Gloeckner, Jason Shiga, Aaron Renier, Michael DeForge
- June 28–30: Wizard World New York City Experience (Basketball City, Pier 36, New York City) — scheduled guests include Julie Bell, Mike Deodato, Jr., Stan Lee, Carlos Pacheco, Humberto Ramos, Paolo Rivera, Arthur Suydam, and Boris Vallejo
- July 18–21: San Diego Comic-Con (San Diego Convention Center, San Diego, California)
- August 8–11: Wizard World Chicago (Donald E. Stephens Convention Center, Rosemont, Illinois): Special guests: Stan Lee, Morena Baccarin, James Marsters, Juliet Landau, Manu Bennett, Norman Reedus, Michael Rooker, Andrew McCarthy, Jason David Frank, Alan Davis, Esad Ribić, Pasqual Ferry, Harvey Tolibao, Scott Snyder, Greg Capullo, Kenneth Rocafort, Ramon F. Bachs, Francis Portela, Greg Land, Ethan Van Sciver, and Michael Golden
- August 30–September 2: Dragon*Con (Atlanta, Georgia)
- September 6–8: Cincinnati Comic Con (Cincinnati, Ohio) — announced guests include Ben Templesmith and Tony Moore
- September 7–8: Baltimore Comic-Con (Baltimore Convention Center, Baltimore, Maryland)
- September 13–14: Small Press Expo (Bethesda North Marriott Hotel & Conference Center, North Bethesda, Maryland)
- September 13–15: Cincinnati Comic Expo (Cincinnati, Ohio)
- September 14–15: FantaCon (Marriott Hotel, Albany, New York) — Thomas Skulan's horror & comics convention returns after a 23-year hiatus; guests include Stephen R. Bissette, Judith O'Dea, Judith Ridley, John A. Russo and Kyra Schon
- September 20–22: Wizard World Ohio Comic Con (Greater Columbus Convention Center, Columbus, Ohio)
- September 27–29: Pittsburgh Comicon (Monroeville Convention Center, Monroeville, Pennsylvania)
- September 28: Wildcat Comic Con (Pennsylvania College of Technology, Williamsport, Pennsylvania)
- September 28–29: Massachusetts Independent Comics Expo [MICE] (University Hall, Cambridge, Massachusetts) — show expands to two days; guests include Nick Abadzis, Lucy Knisley, Josh Neufeld, and Maris Wicks
- October 10–13: New York Comic Con (Jacob K. Javits Convention Center, New York City)
- October 11–13: Komikazen (Ravenna, Italy) — themed in solidarity with the Occupy movement: 99 cartoonists came to Ravenna and made work related to the concept of "We are the 99%."
- October 23–November 16: Comica — London International Comics Festival (various venues, London, UK) — guests include Joe Sacco, Eddie Campbell, Dave McKean, Oscar Zárate, ILYA, Simon Spurrier, Kieron Gillen, Will Brooker, Richard Reynolds, Gareth Brookes, Daniel Merlin Goodbrey, Woodrow Phoenix, Hunt Emerson, Sean Michael Wilson
- October 31–November 3: Lucca Comics & Games (Lucca, Italy)
- November 2–3: Rhode Island Comic Con (Rhode Island Convention Center, Providence, Rhode Island)
- November 2: Comica Comiket (Fall) (Central Saint Martins, University of the Arts London, England)
- November 14–17: Festival of Cartoon Art (Billy Ireland Cartoon Library & Museum, Ohio State University, Columbus, Ohio) — "Grand Opening Festival of Cartoon Art"; speakers included Paul Pope, Jeff Smith, the Hernandez brothers, Matt Bors, Eddie Campbell, Stephan Pastis, Brian Basset, Kazu Kibuishi, and Art Spiegelman
- December 1: Genghis Con (Beachland Ballroom and Tavern, Cleveland, Ohio) — guests include Derf Backderf

== First issues by title ==
The Accelerators
Release: May by Blue Juice Comics. Writer: RFI Porto Artist: Gavin Smith

Age of Ultron
Release: March by Marvel Comics. Writer: Brian Michael Bendis Artist: Bryan Hitch

Alex + Ada
Release: November by Image Comics. Writer: Sarah Vaughn and Jonathan Luna Artist: Jonathan Luna

Black Beetle
Release: January by Dark Horse Comics. Writer/Artist: Francesco Francavilla

East of West
Release: March by Image Comics. Writer: Jonathan Hickman Artist: Nick Dragotta

Five Weapons
Release: February by Image Comics. Writer & Artist: Jimmie Robinson

Guardians of the Galaxy vol 3
Release: February by Marvel Comics. Writer: Brian Michael Bendis Artist: Steve McNiven

Helheim
Release: March by Oni Press. Writer: Cullen Bunn Artist: Joëlle Jones

Justice League Beyond 2.0
Release: August by DC Comics. Writer: Christos Gage Artist: Iban Coello;Lazarus
Release: June by Image Comics. Writer: Greg Rucka Artist: Michael Lark

Lost Vegas
Release: March by Image Comics. Writer: Jim McCann Artist: Janet K. Lee

New Avengers vol 3
Release: January by Marvel Comics. Writer: Jonathan Hickman Artist: Steve Epting
Nova vol 5
Release: January by Marvel Comics. Writer: Jeph Loeb Artist: Ed McGuiness
Resident Alien: The Suicide Blonde
Release: August by Dark Horse. Writer: Peter Hogan Artist: Steve Parkhouse
Sex
Release: March by Image Comics. Writer: Joe Casey Artist: Piotr Kowalski

Uncanny Skullkickers
Release: February by Image Comics. Writer: Jim Zub Artists: Edwin Huang and Misty Coats
