= Rip in Time =

Comic book series

Publication information
- Publisher: Fantagor Press
- Format: Limited series
- Genre: Science fiction
- Publication date: 1986 – 1987
- No. of issues: 5

Creative team
- Created by: Richard Corben; Bruce Jones
- Written by: Bruce Jones
- Artist(s): Richard Corben
- Editor(s): Richard Corben

Collected editions
- Rip in Time Collected: ISBN 0-9623841-1-9

Rip in Time is a five-part comic book limited series written by Bruce Jones and illustrated by Richard Corben, first published by Fantagor Press in 1986. It tells the story of police officer Rip Scully and his adventures traveling back in time to the Cretaceous period, in pursuit of the man who kidnapped his fiancée.

== Plot ==
=== Issue #1 ===
In a large laboratory full of personnel and equipment, Col. Sharon Nelson meets Dr. Philpot, the managing director, who assures her everything is on schedule for their project's test run that evening. LAPD officer Rip Scully and his fiancée, Maggie, are in a liquor store when Sid Resnick, brandishing a sawed-off shotgun, accompanied by his girlfriend, Darlene, rob the store. Rip attempts to prevent the holdup, but Sid escapes and abducts the police officer's fiancée, forcing Maggie to drive. Rip drags the criminal's accomplice into Sid's car and gives chase. Miles ahead, to avoid oncoming traffic in the passing lane, Maggie drives through the guardrail and down a steep mountain incline, crashing through a wall at the bottom and discover an X-54 aircraft. Sid drags Maggie inside and flies the hovercraft through a tunnel.

As the Colonel and Dr. Philpot conduct their planned 11:30 p.m. test, a large hoop-like portal opens in the lab. Sid, still dragging Rip's fiancee, Maggie, crashes through the lab in the aircraft he stole, destroying equipment before exiting through the mysterious doorway. Rip follows them closely in the hoodlum's car. Technician Beacham grabs a sub-space communication device and attempts to pursue them, but the portal collapses upon him. On the other side of the portal, Rip and his prisoner, Darlene, escape from Sid's vehicle, which has become mired in a tar pit. While frantically looking for the abducted Maggie, Rip picks up the communicator and hears Dr. Philpot telling him to remain just where he is. A pterodactyl swoops by, and Rip asks Philpot just where that might be.

=== Issue #2 ===
The pterodactyl clutches Sid's prisoner, Darlene, and flies away. Rip shoots at it and runs to help Darlene where she has fallen from the creature's grasp. Seeing distant smoke, Rip assumes that it's the wreckage of the stolen aircraft, and he and Darlene head in that direction. Both having survived the crash, Maggie tells Sid that Rip will certainly rescue her, whilst Sid boasts that he will kill Rip as soon as he appears. At the heavily damaged lab, Colonel Nelson blames the loss of the experimental aircraft on Rip's supposed interference and contacts a mercenary, John Roper, to be brought to the base.

Approaching the site of the crash, Rip and Darlene encounter a herd of grazing Triceratops. A distant erupting volcano causes the animals stampede and Rip and Darlene leap onto the back of one of the dinosaurs. As the animals charge over a cliff to their deaths, Rip grasps a large tree branch, and he and Darlene swing to safety. Elsewhere, Sid, lounging in the grass, has Maggie gather wood for a bonfire. Maggie drops a pile of collected sticks at his feet when Sid demands that she undress, becoming enraged as she refuses. When a turtle-like Ankylosaur appears, Sid fires blindly at it as he flees into the jungle. Later, Maggie warms herself by the fire and calls out: "You can come out now. It's gone."

=== Issue #3 ===
Rip and Darlene awaken in a tree in which they spent the night. Darlene thanks Rip for saving her life, but Rip pushes her away and Darlene insults him before storming off. At the crash site, Sid wakes up to the sound of Maggie bathing in a nearby pond. Maggie says that she smelled bad and that Sid should take the hint. He does so but tries to pull her under the water and force himself on her, but Maggie fights him off. Back at the project, Philpot visits Colonel Nelson in her room, where she is taking doses of amphetamines in a misguided attempt to stay focused. Having had previous experience of the mercenary, Dr. Philpot refuses to admit Roper into the lab. Colonel Nelson seems to relent when Roper's face appears on a TV monitor. As the image distracts Philpot, the Colonel pushes him into the monitor, knocking him unconscious.

Finding the site of the demolished X-54, but no sign of Sid or Maggie, Rip spots a coil of nylon rope, presumably part of the aircraft's emergency kit. When a Tyrannosaurus rex chases them, Rip manages to tie the rope between two large trees and causes it to trip across the rope. Rip fires his pistol multiple times into the creature's head. He and Darlene run off, believing it to be dead — although once they're gone, its eyes reopen. At the project facility, Colonel Nelson instructs Roper to find and kill Rip and the others. She equips him with a powerful weapon and tells him to hurry through the re-activated Hoop, as it will only briefly stay open. Walking through the portal, Roper immediately confronts a Dilophosaurus. He fires the grenade launcher, exploding the creature. As Roper walks away, a small drone detaches from the weapon and observes him from above.

=== Issue #4 ===
Having observed a pack of Velociraptors attacking an Apatosaurus, Rip makes a bow and arrows with his pocket knife and kills a nesting Archaeopteryx. He and Darlene cook it around a small fire. Rip and Darlene have a fight, ending with a kiss, while Roper crouches nearby, watching. Meanwhile, having cruelly tortured a Stegosaurus, Sid is bound hand and foot by Roper then binds his hands and feet and strings him up by his ankles. Roper tells Maggie that he is a hunter and is going to use Sid as bait to "summon the policeman."

At the facility, Philpot wakes up. Finding the Colonel watching drone footage of Roper with Maggie, he lectures the Colonel on the dangers of infecting the timeline; she contends that so long as everyone that goes through the Hoop stays through it, no damage can be done. Having pretended to accept this argument, Philpot suddenly pushes the Colonel out of the lab and seals the door.

Rip and Darlene follow bootprints to a river, construct a raft and float across. Hearing a loud scream from the opposite shore, they are nearly capsized by an angry Plesiosaur. As the creature seems about to get them, Roper kills it, and they're able to reach shore. Following the footprints up a hill, they discover a dismembered Sid, which explains the screams they had heard. Turning away from the scene, they push through the jungle in the direction of nearby moans. Maggie is tied down in a fiendish death trap. Roper appears, warns Rip that untying the wrong rope would cause Maggie's death, and challenges Rip to a contest of survival against him.

=== Issue #5 ===
Rip kneels by Maggie, examines the structure of the rope web, chooses correctly and saves Maggie. Before he can confront his adversary, however, Roper flees into the jungle. Rip suggests that he, Maggie and Darlene should pursue Roper together until they can reach the Hoop entry site, but there is no unanimity. A rain quickly escalates to a flash flood. In the flood, Rip becomes separated from Darlene and Maggie, who make their way to shore. They are confronted by Roper, who ties the women to a tree.

Back at the facility, the Colonel has summoned men to burn through the lab door with acetylene torches. Philpot ignores her threats from outside and turns from repairing the Hoop to fixing the Z-29, an early prototype of the X-54 craft. The Colonel asserts that Philpot has not enough time to rescue Rip and company. Philpot replies that time is the operative word. Having repaired the Z-29, Philpot flies through the activated Hoop, arriving in time to warn Rip, warning him that Roper is about to fire. Seeing Philpot, Roper aims at him instead, crashing and nearly destroying the Z-29. Rip and Darlene run to it, Philpot telling them with his dying words where the Hoop is active. Rip and Darlene fly back to the portal, crossing paths with the T- Rex they'd tried to kill earlier.

Back in present time, the Colonel and her men rush through the lab door, guns drawn, when Rip and Darlene burst through on the Z-29, closely followed by the T-Rex, which promptly begins to attack the Colonel and her men. Darlene and Rip flee the lab and the time gate is destroyed. Outside, heading into the desert, Rip vows to return to the project and somehow use the Hoop to rescue Maggie.

== Collected editions ==
The series has been collected into a trade paperback published by Fantagor Press ISBN 0-9623841-1-9

== Reception ==
Comic Review UK praised the series, noting that both the plotting and artwork work to make the series a "delightfully visceral thriller"

== See also ==
- Den
- Bloodstar
- A Boy and His Dog
- Heavy Metal Magazine
