= Pingru =

Pingru is a Chinese given name. Notable people with the name include:

- Zheng Pingru (1918–1940), Chinese socialite and spy
- Rao Pingru (1922–2020), Chinese comic book author
