= Neverwhere (disambiguation) =

Neverwhere is a 1996 television series by Neil Gaiman.

Neverwhere may also refer to:

- Neverwhere (novel), a 1996 novelization of the series by Neil Gaiman
- Neverwhere (radio play), a 2013 radio adaptation of the series
- Neverwhere (1968), a 1968 short film by Richard Corben
