= Lindsay Gardner =

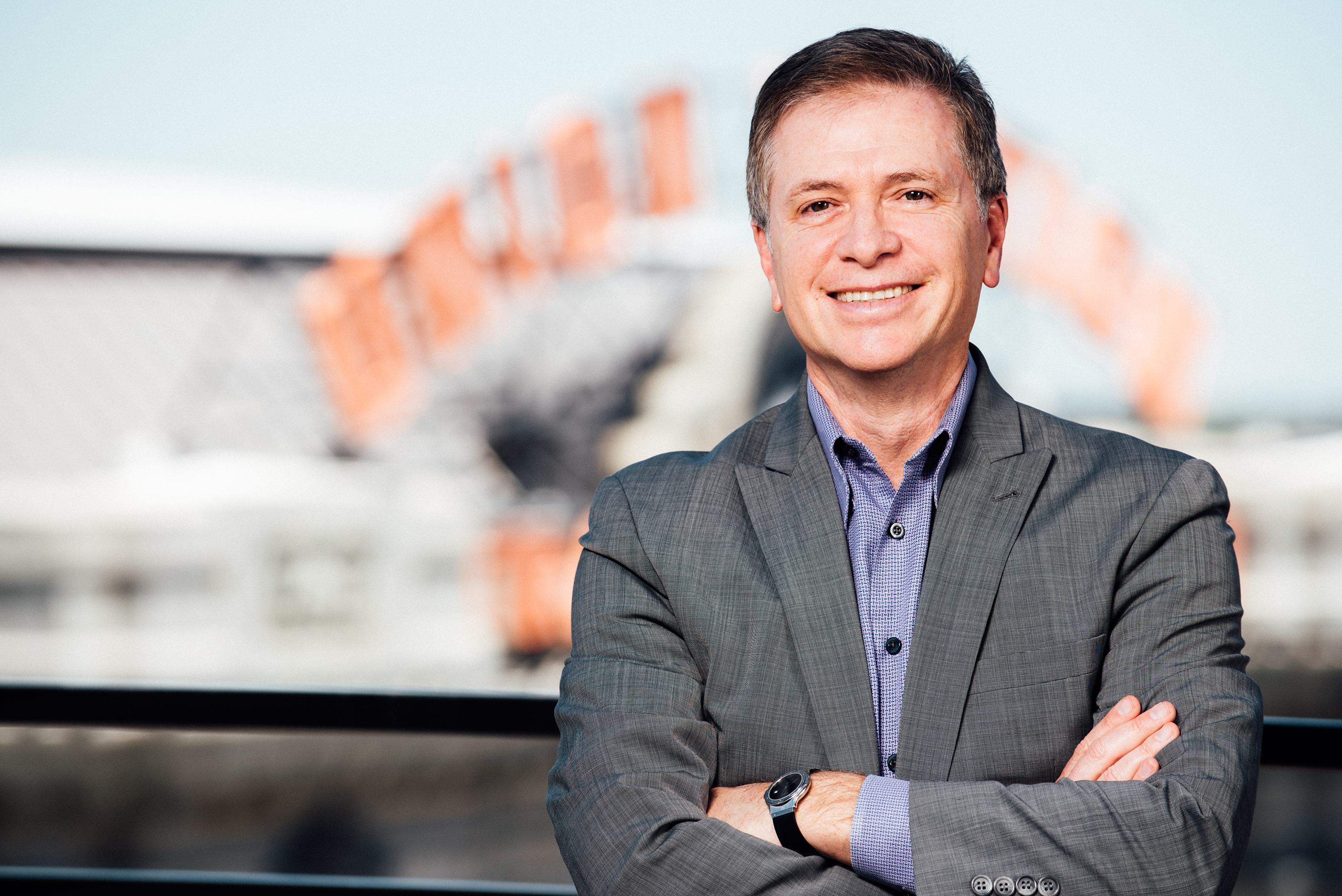
- Born: Lindsay Gardner; June 3, 1960 (age 66); New York, New York
- Education: Brandeis University; Wharton School of Business, University of Pennsylvania
- Occupation: Media executive
- Board member of: IZEA, Courage Campaign

Lindsay Gardner (born 1960) is an American media executive and strategist. The senior vice president and chief content officer at T-Mobile, he previously held senior positions at media companies including Miramax, Tribune Media, and AMC Networks. Gardner is also an independent director of IZEA.

== Early life and education ==
Gardner was born in New York to Harriet Modell Gardner, a writer, and Gerald Gardner, a television writer and producer. He attended Beverly Hills High School and later went on to attend Brandeis University, where he served as the editor of the college's newspaper, The Justice. Gardner graduated from Brandeis University in 1982 and earned an MBA from the Wharton School in 1989.

== Career ==
Gardner was recruited by Satellite News Channel (SNC), a 24-hour news channel, and joined the company at its launch in June 1982. After SNC went off the air in 1983 due to distribution issues, Gardner was hired to produce Eyewitness News for WWL-TV, the CBS affiliate in New Orleans. During Gardner’s four years at WWL, Eyewitness News won several awards, including an Edward R. Murrow Award for Best Newscast. Gardner left WWL in 1987 to attend Wharton.

In 1989, Gardner was hired by Viewer's Choice, (now iNDEMAND Networks). In 1993 he was named director of programming at Cox Communications, where he launched joint-venture channels with the BBC. In 1999, Gardner joined Fox Networks, and in 2006 he was promoted to president of affiliate sales and marketing. At Fox, he launched networks such as Fox Sports Networks, National Geographic Channel, and Fox Reality. He left Fox in 2007 to become a partner at MediaTech Capital Partners where he co-founded digital media companies, including Channel Islands, Porto Media, and Beijing-based Reach Media.

From 2010 through 2013, Gardner served as strategic advisor to the CEO of Miramax, developing Miramax's digital distribution plan and its execution through agreements with Netflix and Hulu+. In 2010, he joined Oaktree Capital Management, a Los Angeles-based private equity firm, as a senior advisor. He was appointed an independent director of IZEA in 2013.

Gardner joined the cable television startup Layer3 TV in 2014 as its chief content officer. He coined the phrase "concierge cable" in an interview with the Hollywood Reporter when asked to characterize Layer3's focus on customer experience.

Layer3 was acquired by T-Mobile in 2018, with its primary executive team retained by the company.

== Philanthropy and personal life ==
Gardner is Chairman of the Board of the Courage Campaign Institute, a Los Angeles based non-profit which seeks to defend and extend human rights through leadership-development training, strategic research and public education. He was National Finance Chairman of Rep. Harold Ford Jr.'s 2006 US Senate campaign and was a member of President Obama’s National Finance Committee and a trustee of the Economic Innovation Institute and Action Fund.

Gardner currently resides in Denver, Colorado.
