= The Punisher: The End =

2004 American comic book

- The Punisher: The End #1 (June 2004); Cover art by Richard Corben.

Publication information
- Publisher: MAX Comics (Marvel Comics)
- Format: One-shot
- Publication date: June 2004
- No. of issues: 1
- Main character: Punisher

Creative team
- Written by: Garth Ennis
- Artist: Richard Corben
- Colorist: Lee Loughridge

The Punisher: The End is a one-shot comic published by Marvel Comics under the MAX imprint, belonging to "The End" series. It narrates the Punisher's last days in a post-apocalyptic future. The timeline of events is indicated as "soon" on the comic's opening page.

== Plot ==
The story is set in the aftermath of World War III, which began in Iraq before a quick escalation by North Korea, Pakistan and China against the United States and its allies. It culminated in a nuclear exchange which resulted in the destruction of nearly all of human civilization. Frank Castle, who had been apprehended and incarcerated in Sing-Sing Prison some years before the war broke out, survives by taking refuge in a fallout shelter hidden in the prison's high-security block. He hides out along with a handful of other prisoners and prison officers. One year after the nuclear attack, Frank leaves the prison and begins his journey to New York City; he is accompanied by Paris Peters, a con artist who expresses interest in Frank's mission to find another bomb shelter hidden deep beneath the former site of the World Trade Center.

The pair travel across upstate New York, journeying through the ruined remains of civilization. They do this despite knowing that they will inevitably die as a result of their prolonged exposure to dangerously high levels of radiation. They manage to locate and gain access to the hidden bomb shelter, upon which they fall unconscious. Both awaken in the infirmary, where doctors reveal they will die within hours due to radiation poisoning. Frank proceeds to murder the doctors and the guards, taking their weapons and shooting his way through the shelter's security forces before finally arriving in a board room filled with the Coven. The Coven is a group of generals, senators, oil magnates, and tech billionaires. Frank, having learned about the group's existence from a prisoner at Sing-Sing who designed their shelter, blames them for escalating the War on Terror in the name of profit.

As Frank is about to execute the Coven; they beg for mercy, revealing that other members hidden in bases across the world, have self-destructed due to outbreaks of insanity. They further reveal that they are the last people left on Earth and thus the last hope for humanity. However, they believe that they can repopulate the world with the resources they control in the shelter. Believing that these people would merely doom the world again instead of saving it and rebuilding anew, Frank promptly kills them all. When Paris asks why he chose to execute the Coven and likely dash any hope of rebuilding human civilization, Castle replies, "The human race. You've seen what that leads to." He then states that no mere con-artist would be in the high-security block. This lead Paris to confess that his crime, initially arson planned as a simple means of insurance fraud, also set fire to a kindergarten, resulting in the deaths of several dozen children. Consequently, Frank strangles Paris as a punishment for his crimes.

After killing Paris, Frank leaves the shelter and re-emerges into the irradiated Manhattan wasteland with his hair falling out in clumps and fire burning his flesh as he starts walking to New York City's Central Park. In his now-shattered mind, he believes that the year is 1976 and that he is on his way to meet his family. The story ends with Frank hoping that he is able to save his family this time.
