= Helen Courtney =

New Zealand cartoonist (1952–2020)

Helen Kathleen Courtney (5 June 1952 – 4 March 2020) was a New Zealand cartoonist and illustrator, known for her work on Broadsheet.

== Life ==
Of Ngāti Toa Rangatira, Ngāti Raukawa ki te Tonga and Te Āti Awa descent, Courtney grew up in West Auckland.

== Career ==
Courtney joined the Broadsheet collective in 1974, contributing cartoons and illustrations and designing the magazine between 1990 and 1991. She published in a number of New Zealand publications including, Craccum (1983) and Tu Mai (1984).

== Chess ==
Helen Courtney represented New Zealand three times in the Women's Chess Olympiad.

== Publications ==
- Harpies & heroines : a cartoon history of women's changing roles (featured, 2003)
- Broadsheet (designer, 1990-1991)
- No body's perfect: a self-help book for women who have problems with food (illustrator, 1989)

== Exhibitions ==
- Killer Queen: Cartoons by Helen Courtney (2015), The Charlotte Museum, Auckland
- Harpies & Heroines (2003), National Library of New Zealand
