= Richard Corben =

American illustrator and comic book artist (1940–2020)

- Corben working on the cover for Jeremy Brood #1: Relativity (1982)
- Born: November 1, 1940 Anderson, Missouri, U.S.
- Died: December 2, 2020 (aged 80)
- Areas: Writer, Penciller, Artist, Inker, Editor, Publisher, Letterer, Colourist
- Pseudonyms: Gore, Corb, Harvey Sea
- Notable works: Den, Bloodstar, Rip in Time, Bat Out of Hell (album cover).
- Awards: CINE Golden Eagle, 1968; Shazam Award, 1971, 1973; Spectrum Grand Master Award, 2009; The Will Eisner Award Hall of Fame, 2012; Grand Prix de la ville d'Angoulême, 2018

Richard Corben (November 1, 1940 – December 2, 2020) was an American illustrator and comic book artist best known for his comics featured in Heavy Metal magazine, especially the Den series which was featured in the magazine's first film adaptation in 1981. He was the winner of the 2009 Spectrum Grand Master Award and the 2018 Grand Prix at Angoulême. In 2012 he was elected to the Will Eisner Award Hall of Fame.

== Biography ==
Richard Corben was born on a farm in Anderson, Missouri, and went on to get a Bachelor of Fine Arts degree from the Kansas City Art Institute, in 1965. At the same time, he trained in bodybuilding, but eventually retired from the art with few accomplishments due to a lack of time to dedicate himself to it.

After working as a professional animator at Kansas City's Calvin Productions, Corben started writing and illustrating for the underground comics, including Grim Wit, Slow Death, Skull, Rowlf, Fever Dreams and his own anthology Fantagor. In 1970 he began illustrating horror and science-fiction stories for Warren Publishing. His stories appeared in Creepy, Eerie, Vampirella, 1984 and Comix International. He also colored several episodes of Will Eisner's Spirit. All the stories and covers he did for Creepy and Eerie have been reprinted by Dark Horse Books in a single volume: Creepy Presents Richard Corben. The three stories he drew for Vampirella have been reprinted by Dynamite Entertainment in Vampirella Archives Vol. 5.

In 1975, when Moebius, Druillet, and Jean-Pierre Dionnet started publishing the magazine Métal Hurlant in France, Corben submitted some of his stories to them. He continued his work for the franchise in America, where the magazine was called Heavy Metal. Also in 1975, a selection of his black-and-white underground comix stories was collected in hardcover as The Richard Corben Funnybook from Kansas City's Nickelodeon Press. In 1976 he adapted a short Robert E. Howard story in an early graphic novel, Bloodstar.

Among the stories drawn for Heavy Metal he continued the saga of his most famous creation, Den, which had begun in the short film Neverwhere and a short story in the underground publication Grim Wit No. 2. The saga of Den is a fantasy series about the adventures of a young underweight nerd who travels to Neverwhere, a universe taking inspirational nods from Robert E. Howard's Hyborian Age, Edgar Rice Burroughs's Barsoom and H. P. Lovecraft's horror dimensions. This story was adapted in a highly abridged form, in the animated film Heavy Metal, where Den was voiced by John Candy in a humorous interpretation of the character that Corben found excellent.

Corben's collaborations are varied, ranging from Rip in Time with Bruce Jones, to Harlan Ellison for Vic and Blood, to the Mutant World titles, Jeremy Brood, and The Arabian Nights with Jan Strnad.

From 1986 to 1994 Corben operated his own publishing imprint, Fantagor Press. Among the titles Fantagor published were Den, Den Saga, Horror in the Dark, Rip in Time, and Son of Mutant World. Fantagor went out of business after the 1994 contraction of the comics industry.

Due to the sexual nature of Corben's art, it has been accused of being pornographic, a description he disagreed with, preferring to call his work "sensual" instead. One notorious example was the interview he gave Heavy Metal editor Brad Balfour in 1981. Corben was very dissatisfied with the interview. He felt it portrayed him as a "petty, childish, borderline psychotic oaf". He wrote a letter in retort, which was published in the September 1981 issue.

Corben did the cover of Meat Loaf's Bat Out of Hell, Jim Steinman's Bad for Good and a movie poster (based on a layout compositional sketch by Neal Adams) for the Brian De Palma film Phantom of the Paradise. In addition, he provided cover art for the VHS release of the low-budget horror film Spookies.

In 2000, Corben collaborated with Brian Azzarello on five issues of Azzarello's run on Hellblazer (146–150) which was collected in a trade called Hellblazer: Hard Time. He also adapted the classic horror story The House on the Borderland by William Hope Hodgson for DC's Vertigo imprint. In 2001, Azzarello and Corben teamed up to create Marvel's Startling Stories: Banner (a four issue mini-series exploring Doc Samson's relationship with Bruce Banner) and Marvel MAX's Cage (a five issue mini-series starring Luke Cage). In June 2004, Corben joined with Garth Ennis to produce The Punisher: The End, a one-shot title for Marvel published under the MAX imprint as part of Marvel's The End series. The story tells of The Punisher's final days on an earth ravaged by nuclear holocaust. Ever the independent, Corben would work with rocker Rob Zombie and Steve Niles in 2005 on a project for IDW Publishing called Bigfoot. In 2007, Corben did a two issue run on Marvel Comics' surreal demon biker, Ghost Rider. At Marvel's MAX imprint he has produced Haunt of Horror, a mini-series adapting classic works of horror to comics. The first mini-series, published in 2006, was based on the stories of Edgar Allan Poe followed by a second series in 2008 adapting works by H. P. Lovecraft. Between 2008 and 2009 he illustrated the flashback sequences in Conan of Cimmeria #1–7, collected as Conan Volume 7: Cimmeria. In 2009 he illustrated Starr the Slayer for Marvel's MAX comics imprint. Since then Corben has done more work for Marvel, DC, IDW, and most notably Dark Horse, drawing the Eisner Award-winning Hellboy.

In May 2020, Parallax Studio announced preproduction on the live-action animated film MEAD (originally titled To Meet the Faces You Meet) based on the comic book Fever Dreams illustrated by Corben and written by Jan Strnad. The film stars Robert Picardo and Samuel Hunt and features the voices of Patton Oswalt and Patrick Warburton. MEAD was premiered at the 2022 Cannes Film Festival on May 22, 2022, and was released for streaming in North America on August 9, 2022.

== Personal life ==
Corben's wife is named Madonna "Dona" (née Marchant). Corben was the special-effects/animation technician for her prize-winning film entry Siegfried Saves Metropolis in a contest sponsored by Famous Monsters of Filmland magazine in 1964 (see issues #34 and 35). They married soon afterward in 1965. They had a daughter, Beth, who is a watercolor painter and often colored her father's comics.

Corben died on December 2, 2020, following heart surgery. He was 80 years old.

== Awards ==
Corben's work in comics and animation has won him recognition, including the Shazam Award for Outstanding New Talent in 1971, and a Shazam Award for Superior Achievement by an Individual in 1973. Corben won a 1973 Goethe Award for "Favorite Fan Artist". He also received a CINE Golden Eagle and President of Japan Cultural Society trophy in 1968 for his short film Neverwhere.

While working for the Warren anthologies, he received numerous Warren Awards: 1973 Best Artist/Writer and Special Award for "Excellence", 1976 Best Art for "Within You, Without You" (Eerie #77) and Best Cover (also for Eerie #77), and 1978 Best Cover Artist.

In 2009 Corben won the "Best Finite Series/Limited Series" Eisner Award for Hellboy: The Crooked Man and in 2011 he won the "Best Single Issue (or One-Shot)" Eisner Award, for Hellboy: Double Feature of Evil. Finally, in 2012 he was elected to the Will Eisner Award Hall of Fame.

In 2015, Corben was inducted into the Ghastly Awards Hall of Fame. His previous Ghastly Awards include Best Artist in 2013 and Best One-shot Comics for his Dark Horse Poe adaptations... Edgar Allan Poe's The Conqueror Worm in 2012, Edgar Allan Poe: The Raven & The Red Death (2013) and Edgar Allan Poe's Morella and the Murders in the Rue Morgue in 2014.

In January 2018 he won the prestigious Grand Prix at Angoulême and presidency of the 2019 festival. Beginning concurrently with the 2019 festival in January, a 250-piece collection of his original artworks was put on display at the Musée d'Angoulême, the exhibit ending March 10, 2019.

== See also ==
- Rip in Time
- Bloodstar
- A Boy and His Dog
- Heavy Metal magazine

== Sources ==
- Corben, Richard; Alan Moore (Introduction) (2000). The House on the Borderland. DC Comics. ISBN 978-1-56389-545-6.
- Corben, Richard (1977). The Odd World of Richard Corben. A Warren Adult Fantasy Publication. Warren Publishing Co. ISBN 978-2-913999-01-5.
- Corben, Richard; Moebius (preface) (2001). Den La Quete, tome 2. Toth. ISBN 978-84-85138-21-0.
- Balfour, Brad (June 1981). "The Richard Corben Interview, Part 1". Heavy Metal (51): 6–11.
- Balfour, Brad (July 1981). "The Richard Corben Interview, Part 2". Heavy Metal (52): 8–14.
- Bharucha, Fershid (1981). Richard Corben: Flights Into Fantasy. Thumb Tack Books. ISBN 978-84-499-1949-7.
- Bissette, Stephen R.; Wiater, Stanley (1993). Comic Book Rebels: Conversations with the Creators of New Comics. Donald I. Fine, Inc. ISBN 978-1-55611-354-3.
- Garriock, P. R. (1978). Masters of Comic Book Art. Morpheus International. ISBN 978-0-9623447-6-3.
- Giger, H. R. (1993). Necronomicon II. Aurum Press, Ltd. ISBN 978-0-905664-05-7.
- Horn, Maurice (1985). Sex in the Comics. Chelsea House Publishers. ISBN 978-0-87754-850-8.
- Kurtzman, Harvey (1991). From Aargh to Zap!Harvey Kurtzman's Visual History of the Comics. Prentice Hall Press. ISBN 978-0-13-363680-2.
- Richardson, John Adkins (1977). The Complete Book of Cartooning. Prentice-Hall, Inc. ISBN 0-13-157594-5.
- Sackmann, Eckart (1987). Great Masters of Fantasy Art. Parkwest Pubns. ISBN 978-3-89268-008-6.
- Oliver, Agustín (2004). Richard Corben (Un rebelde tranquilo). Sinsentido. ISBN 978-84-95634-51-1.
- Van Hise, James (1989). How to Draw Art for Comic Books: Lessons from the Masters. Pioneer Books, Inc. ISBN 978-1-55698-254-5.
- Adams, Neal (1976). The Neal Adams Treasury. Pure Imagination.
- Balfour, Brad (June 2001). "The Richard Corben Interview, Part 1". Heavy Metal (51): 6–11.
- Balfour, Brad (July 2001). "The Richard Corben Interview, Part 2". Heavy Metal (52): 8–14.
- Balfour, Brad (August 2001). "The Richard Corben Interview, Part 3". Heavy Metal (53): 8–13.
- Bharucha, Fershid (1981). Richard Corben: Flights Into Fantasy. Thumb Tack Books. ISBN 978-84-499-1949-7.
- Brayshaw, Christopher (December 1998). "Interview Frank Miller". The Comics Journal (209): 69.
- Giger, H. R. (1993). H. R. Giger Necronomicon II. Morpheus International. ISBN 978-0-9623447-6-3.
- Holm, E. K. (2004). R. Crumb: Conversations. University Press of Mississippi. ISBN 1-57806-637-9.
- Seuling, Phil (1975). "The Fantasy Epic: Creating the Graphic Novel". Mediascene (16): 8–9.
