= Gerald Gardner (writer) =

American author (1929–2020)

- Born: Gerald Clifford Gardner; July 22, 1929
- Died: October 11, 2020 (aged 91); Woodland Hills, California, U.S.
- Occupations: author, scriptwriter, producer
- Known for: Get Smart, The Monkees

Gerald Clifford Gardner (July 22, 1929 – October 11, 2020) was an American author, scriptwriter, screenwriter, comics writer, story editor and producer who was active in the 1960s, 1970s, and 1980s. Gardner frequently teamed with his longtime writing partner, Dee Caruso, for their work.

== Career ==
He wrote 22 episodes of The Monkees and 11 of Get Smart, including "The Amazing Harry Hoo", "Washington 4, Indians 3", and "Diplomat's Daughter" (featuring The Craw). Get Smart episodes he worked on were nominated for Primetime Emmy Awards.

Gardner was a senior writer on the live broadcasts of That Was The Week That Was (TW3), the NBC-TV series of topical satire.

His producing credits include The Red Skelton Show (1970–1971). Gardner and Caruso co-wrote the Walt Disney motion picture The World's Greatest Athlete starring Jan-Michael Vincent and John Amos. He is also the author of more than 30 books, including the political satire series "Who's In Charge Here?"

In 1963 he also wrote gags for the daily satirical comic strip Miss Caroline: The Little Girl in the Big White House by Frank B. Johnson (cartoonist), about the supposed daughter of the U.S. President. When President Kennedy was murdered later that year the comic strip was instantly canceled.

Gardner was the father of media executive Lindsay Gardner.

Gardner died October 11, 2020, of lung cancer at the Motion Picture Home in Woodland Hills, California, aged 91.
