= Bruno Madaule =

French comic book author (1971–2020)

- Born: 4 March 1971; Castres, France
- Died: 13 September 2020 (aged 49)
- Occupation: Comic book author

Bruno Madaule (4 March 1971 – 13 September 2020) was a French comic book author. He graduated from the École d'Architecture de Toulouse in 1988. He died on 13 September 2020 from cancer.

== Publications ==
- Les Zinzinventeurs (2001–2005)
- 35 heures & cie (2005)
- Tout ce que vous avez toujours voulu savoir sur le Père Noël (2008)
- Givrés ! (2009–2016)

== Awards ==
- "Angoulême International Comics Festival Prix Jeunesse 7–8 ans" for Les Zinzinventeurs (2002)
