= Doc and Raider =

Comic strip by Sean Martin

- Author: Sean Martin
- Launch date: 1987 (print); 2009 (webcomic)
- End date: 13 July 2020
- Genre: LGBT

Doc and Raider is a Canadian comic strip, created by Sean Martin. Published in newspapers and magazines for LGBTQ audiences beginning in 1987, the strip's main characters are Doc and Raider, two gay men who began the series as roommates but eventually became a couple. Doc was a writer, while Raider was a construction worker.

In its original format, the strip ran from 1987 to 1997. Martin subsequently revived the strip as a webcomic in the mid-2000s, and independently published a new collection of Doc and Raider cartoons in 2013.

== Original strip ==
The strip was usually drawn as a single panel, although for some more complex stories Martin used a multipanel format; sometimes an edition of the strip represented a standalone gag, while at other times the strip would tell an extended story over several weeks. Some scenes were set in Toronto's gay village, such as the steps of the Second Cup at Church and Wellesley. In others, Raider takes part in a rodeo. The names of the characters are taken from a long-running series of western novels by J.D. Hardin, about a pair of Pinkertons agents in the American West in the 1880s. Martin has said that using the names for his own characters was a bit of "cultural sedition".

The series, while primarily humorous, also addressed serious issues in the gay community. During the strip's run, Raider was gay-bashed, which led to an extended conversation between Doc and God on the nature of good and evil. In another, Doc tested positive for HIV. Towards the end of the strip, Doc's HIV status became a strain on their relationship, and a fight between the two erupted into domestic violence. In the final strip, Doc and Raider had reconciled and Raider asked Doc to have unprotected sex, although it was never revealed whether this in fact happened.

The original strip was retired in 1997.

In addition to the regular strip, Doc and Raider appeared in safer sex education campaigns in the late 1980s and early 1990s. The strip's appearance in newspapers and magazines around the world also allowed it to underwrite gay-related causes, everything from an arts festival in Scotland to a hospice in New Zealand, thanks to an arrangement Martin had with each publication: they were free to run the comic as they wished, but they had to put something back into the local community as compensation. It's estimated that Doc and Raider raised somewhere in the neighbourhood of $750,000 during its run. Two books were also published, Doc and Raider: Caught on Tape in 1994 and Doc and Raider: Incredibly Lifelike in 1996. The original sketchbooks have been put in holding with both the National Archive of Canada and the Price Archive at the University of Western Ontario. The digital archive to date is held along with other Doc and Raider miscellanea at the Pride Archive.

Filmmaker Randy Riddle released Raider in Canada: A Portrait of Sean Martin, a documentary film about Martin and the strip, in 1998.

== Revival ==
In 2002 Martin created two standalone stories featuring the characters, which were published in two anthologies sold to raise money for the Little Sister's Defence Fund. More recently, he has redesigned the characters in a more contemporary cartooning style, and has worked on an animated cartoon starring the redesigned characters.

In 2006, Martin began releasing new strips as a webcomic. As of September 2011, due to continuing troubles with Blogger's new image handling, Martin moved the blog to WordPress. With its move to WordPress, the layout of the strip has become much more expansive, with a greater emphasis on the overall design and look of each episode. The cast has also been expanded to include Gilles, Doc's brother, a former Catholic priest; Elliot, Gilles' husband and a producer of "adult entertainment"; the threesome of Mik (a construction foreman), Al (a former state trooper), and Kai (lately of the US Army, now running Elliot's business for him); and Eddie, the "51st richest man in the world". The comic has also seen occasional appearances by pop celebrities, politicians, and Jesus, as it comments on events of the day.

Doc's HIV status was changed back to negative, only because Martin felt the terrain on that subject had been well covered already, and that there were other LGBT issues to be explored.

The webcomic has also allowed the storylines to become longer and more involved, with arcs that are carried sometimes over a month of dailies. Recent stories have covered such ground as being gay in the military in the days before the repeal of DADT, the presidential election, the London Olympics, an encounter with a magic carton of milk, a terrorist who wants to give it up, the temptation of sexual activity outside the relationship, a film production gone hopelessly wrong, and — since the comic travels more or less in real time — growing old. It has also dealt with the problems of relationships across international borders, as Elliot and Gilles bided out Elliot's application to move to Canada. The strip is quickly approaching its 6,000th episode, making it one of the longest running LGBTQ comic strips in history. A number of anthologies have been issued, including Canadian: Hope That's Okay, Tastefully Canadian, and Frankly Canadian. During Canada's 150th anniversary, the strip participated with an officially-recognized project, the Doc and Raider Canada 150 Road Trip, which took the characters across Canada and back, with stories of little known parts of Canadian culture.

On 13 July 2020 the final episode of Doc and Raider was posted. Sean Martin died on 3 August of that year.
