= Doug Sneyd =

Canadian cartoonist (1931–2025)

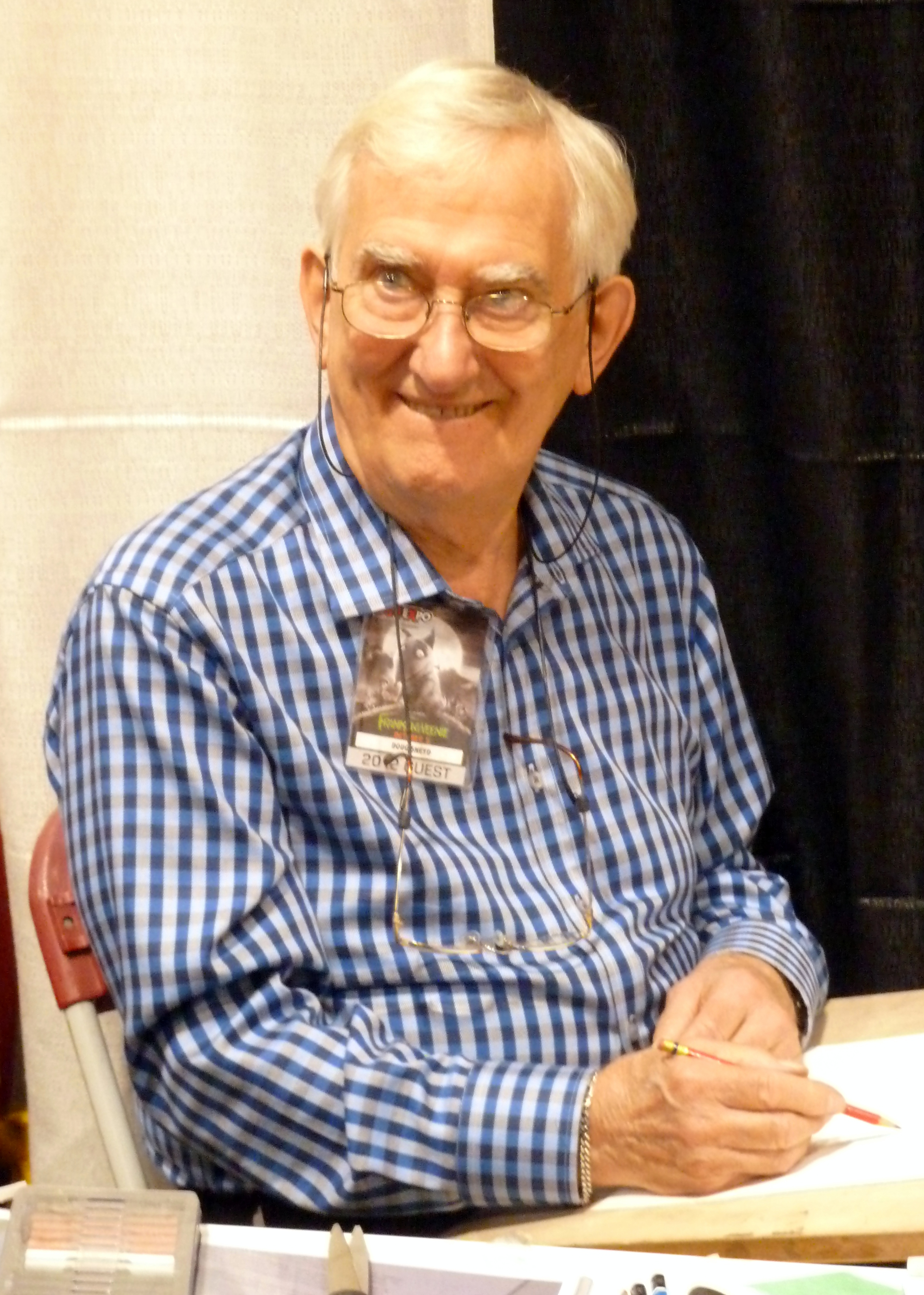
Sneyd at the Fan Expo 2012

Doug Sneyd (December 14, 1931 – January 21, 2025) was a Canadian cartoonist, known for his work for newspapers and magazines, among them Playboy.

== Life and career ==
Sneyd was born in Guelph, one of seven siblings. He took the Famous Artists drawing correspondence course. After graduation, he worked as a commercial and portrait artist in Montreal and Toronto and contributed as a freelance artist for magazines and textbooks, and then for newspapers such as The Toronto Star.

In 1963 he went to Chicago to show his portfolio to the editors of Playboy; hoping to do illustrations for them, he was asked to do gag cartoons. Sneyd objected at first but accepted upon learning cartoonists were very well-paid. He drew more than 450 cartoons for the magazine, until 2016.

He also drew syndicated editorial cartoons and the comic strip SCOOPS for newspapers in Canada and the U.S., and illustrated children's books. In 1969, he moved with his family to Orillia. He was a founding member of the Canadian Society of Book Illustrators and a member of the National Cartoonists Society and the Association of American Editorial Cartoonists. In 1993 he wrote, produced, and directed Black Eyed Susan, an educational short film about domestic violence for the government of Ontario.

Sneyd died at Soldiers' Memorial Hospital in Orillia, on January 21, 2025, at the age of 93.

== Collected works ==
- The Art of Doug Sneyd, 2016, Dark Horse Books.
- Secret Sneyd: The Unpublished Cartoons of Doug Sneyd, 2017, Dark Horse books
