= A Boy and His Dog =

Post-apocalyptic novella cycle by Harlan Ellison

Cover of Vic and Blood#2

A Boy and His Dog is a cycle of narratives by author Harlan Ellison. The cycle tells the story of an amoral boy (Vic) and his telepathic dog (Blood), who work together as a team to survive in the post-apocalyptic world after a nuclear war. The original 1969 novella was adapted into the 1975 film A Boy and His Dog directed by L.Q. Jones.

Both the story and the film were well-received by critics and science fiction fans, but the film was not successful commercially. The original novella was followed by short stories and a graphic novel.

== Publication history ==
Ellison began the cycle with the 1969 short story of the same title, published in New Worlds, and expanded and revised the tale to novella length for his story collection The Beast That Shouted Love at the Heart of the World the same year. He bookended the original story with two others in the same world: "Eggsucker" (The Ariel Book of Fantasy Volume Two, 1977), and "Run, Spot, Run" (Amazing Stories, 1980).

The stories were adapted as a two-issue black and white comic series illustrated by Richard Corben, Vic and Blood: The Chronicles of a Boy and His Dog (Mad Dog Graphics, 1987). The series was collected as a color graphic novel of the same name in 1989 by NBM/St. Martin's Press. It was published in French by Comics USA (Vic & Blood: Les chroniques d'un gars et son chien, 1989) and in Spanish by Norma Editorial (Vic & Blood, CEC No. 72, 1990).

Both the graphic novel and the prose stories were collected in Vic and Blood: The Continuing Adventures of a Boy and His Dog (Edgework Abbey/iBooks, 2003). Ellison's introduction to the collection explains that 1969's A Boy and His Dog is part of a larger novel that he has been writing for over 30 years and that story is finished, but the last, longest part is written as a screenplay with no current plans for production.

Ellison suggested as late as 2003 that he would combine the three stories, possibly with additional material, to create a novel with the proposed title of Blood's a Rover, not to be confused with the Chad Oliver story or the James Ellroy novel Blood's a Rover. In January 2018, Subterranean Press announced the publication of Blood's a Rover, combining materials from the author's files, versions of the novella and short stories that have been expanded and revised, material from Corben's graphic novel, and previously unpublished material from the unproduced 1977 NBC television series Blood's a Rover.

== Setting ==
The novella exists in an alternate timeline setting, diverging with the failed assassination of President John F. Kennedy. Instead of concentrating on the Space Race, technological advancements in robotics, animal intelligence, and telepathy take place. A more heated Cold War takes place, culminating in a conventional World War III.

A truce is signed, lasting another 25 years, though mounting tensions lead to World War IV in 2007, this time involving massive nuclear warfare and only lasting five days. Civilization is almost entirely obliterated, leaving the surface of Earth reduced to a desolate, irradiated wasteland.

Years later, in 2024, foragers who remain above ground must fight for the remaining resources. Most survivors in the former United States are male, as women were usually in the bombed cities while many men were out fighting in the war. In the novella, nuclear fallout had created horrific mutations, such as the feared burnpit screamers, known for their noise and deadliness. In the film, they appear in only one scene, though they are only heard.

== Eggsucker ==
=== Plot ===
Blood recalls how he met Vic in 2048, and describes him as "steadfast, responsible, and game as they come." He recounts an evening during which he and Vic go to barter scavenged items with the "82nd Airborne", the armorers for most of the local roverpacks except for that of the child-slaver "Fellini". Transported from a dock by skiff to the 82nd Airborne's boat, the pair trade wine and spent brass for fresh ammunition, and Vic is invited to stay and drink.

Blood declines to drink, and is repeatedly insulted by the gang, until the goading drives him to attempt to bite one of them. The gang member knocks Blood down and points a rifle at Blood's head, and Vic immediately shoots the gang member. As Vic covers the remaining stunned gang members, Blood climbs into Vic's pack and passes out. He awakens again with them on the dock and Vic running for their lives.

Upon reaching safety, Vic unceremoniously dumps Blood onto the ground and storms off in anger at having lost access to "the only armorer in the territory." Blood initially lets him go, but thinks better of it after considering the alternatives, and saves Vic from walking into a crater in the road containing a "Screamer", a green corpse-like mutant. The pair run miles up the road, and having reconciled, sit down to eat.

== A Boy and His Dog ==
=== Plot ===
Vic, aged 15, was born in and scavenges throughout the wasteland of the former southwestern United States as a "solo", as opposed to a member of a "roverpack" gang. Vic is most concerned with food and sex. Having lost both of his parents, he has no formal education and does not understand ethics or morality. He is accompanied by a well-read, misanthropic, telepathic dog named Blood, who helps him locate women in return for food. Blood cannot forage for himself, due to the same genetic engineering that granted him telepathy. The two steal for a living, evading "roverpacks" (gangs) and mutants. Blood and Vic have an occasionally antagonistic relationship, though they are aware that they need each other.

At a movie house, Blood claims to smell a woman, and the pair track her to an abandoned YMCA building. There, they meet Quilla June Holmes, a teenaged girl from "Downunder", a society located in a large underground nuclear vault, and Vic, feeling attracted to her, hesitates for the first time before raping her. Blood informs the pair that a roverpack has tracked them to the building, and they have to fight them off. After slaughtering a number of them, the trio hides in a boiler and set the structure on fire.

Vic then has sex with Quilla June, and though she protests at first, later comes on to him as she also likes him. Blood takes an instant disliking to her, but Vic ignores him. Vic and Quilla June have sex repeatedly, but eventually she attacks him and takes off to return to her underground community. Vic, furious at her deception, follows her, despite Blood's warnings. Blood remains at the portal on the surface.

Downunder has an artificial biosphere complete with forests and underground cities. One, named Topeka after the ruins of the city it lies beneath, is fashioned in a surreal mockery of 1950s rural innocence. Vic is captured by a four-foot tank robot with claws called "The Sentry" (a 6'4", brawny, grinning, middle-aged looking cyborg named "Michael" in the film) built by the ruling council, the Better Business Bureau who ordered the robot to bring Vic to them. They confess that Quilla June was sent to the surface in order to lure a man to Downunder. The population of Topeka is becoming sterile, and the babies that are born are usually female. They feel that Vic, despite his crudeness and savage behavior, will be able to reinvigorate that male population. Vic is first elated to learn that he is to impregnate the female population, but after a week he grows jaded of his surroundings and plots his escape.

He asks to impregnate Quilla June first with the intention of retaliating against her for abandoning him, but when they are reunited, their feelings take hold and they plan to escape together. Vic uses the fact that Quilla June's father secretly lusts after her as a distraction, incapacitating him and the other elders so they can escape. A shootout ensues on the street, with Vic narrowly refraining a frenzied Quilla June from shooting her mother.

On the surface, Vic and Quilla June discover that Blood is starving and near death, having been attacked by radioactive insects and other "things", and Vic and him now being labeled "undesirables" due to the roverpack they killed at the gym. Quilla June tries to convince Vic to leave Blood and take off with her. Knowing he will never survive without Blood's guidance and, more importantly, that Blood will not survive without care and food, Vic faces a difficult situation. It is implied that he kills his new love and cooks her flesh to save Blood's life. The novella ends with Vic haunted by her question as he and Blood resume traveling the next day: "Do you know what love is?" and he concludes, "Sure I know. A boy loves his dog."

=== Reception ===
The novella won the Nebula Award for Best Novella upon its release in 1969 and was also nominated for the 1970 Hugo Award for Best Novella.

=== Film adaptation ===
The 1975 science fiction film directed by L.Q. Jones was controversial for alleged misogyny. The script included lines that were not in Ellison's original stories and that authors such as Joanna Russ found to be objectionable. The film's final line is from Blood: "Well, I'd say she certainly had marvelous judgement, Albert, if not particularly good taste." Ellison disavowed this addition as a "moronic, hateful chauvinist last line, which I despise."

Ellison accepted that the ending remained popular with fans, saying: "I would have kept the original last line from the original story, which I think is much more human and beguiling than the sort of punchline that L.Q. Jones used. But L.Q. knew what he was doing in terms of the market, I suppose."

Harlan loved the movie, as stated in an interview conversation with L.Q. Jones on the Shout Factory Blu Ray. After Jones screened it to him, he said it was exactly what the story was supposed to be on screen. It was a few days after he brought up his problems, mostly concerning the way Blood talked about the girl during the locker room scene when they first meet.

== Run, Spot, Run ==
=== Plot ===
An almost catatonic Vic and a guilt-ridden Blood continue traveling west, with Vic having hallucinations of a ghostly Quilla June, which Blood shares through their telepathic link. Not daring to bring up the matter of food to Vic, Blood eats a poisonous lizard which along with the hallucinations causes him physical harm. They stumble into an encounter with a roving gang of child slaves led by the adult "Fellini", and Vic badly breaks his ankle while attempting to escape.

At Blood's suggestion, Vic climbs into a hollow tree stump to hide. Blood covers him with leaves and dirt before going to hide himself. Hours later, with the gang gone, Blood returns to find the stump surrounded by giant spiders. Driving them off, Blood finds Vic in a hopeless, unresponsive state, and despite Blood's appeals, Vic allows himself to be cocooned by one of the spiders. Blood runs off as the spider finishes and begins to look for new prey. He continues west, now haunted by the ghost of Vic rather than Quilla June.

=== Production ===
The reasons given by Ellison for this abrupt ending have differed over the years. One relates to his anger over the L.Q. Jones ending of the film, as detailed above. The other is, according to Ellison, essentially a desire to stop his fans from requesting more stories about the two characters. Ellison claimed at the time of the film's release that he had said all he wanted to say about Vic and Blood, and that there would be no more sequels.

== Blood's a Rover ==
Blood's a Rover, a fix-up combining the short stories, novella, and an adaptation of the unproduced 1977 pilot teleplay, was announced by Ace Books in the early 1980s, but was not published. In the introduction to Vic and Blood, in March 2003, Ellison referred to "the final, longest section is in screenplay form—and they're bidding here in Hollywood, once again, for the feature film and TV rights—and one of these days before I go through that final door, I'll translate it into elegant prose, and the full novel will appear".

In 2013, Ellison resumed working on the book, subtitled "The Complete Adventures of a Boy and His Dog". It was published by Subterranean Press on June 30, 2018, two days after Ellison's death. The book consists of the previously published stories Eggsucker, This is a Conversation That Took Place on a Wednesday Night, A Boy and His Dog, Run, Spot, Run, the 1977 script for Blood's a Rover, and includes The Wit and Wisdom of Blood.

=== Plot ===
Alone and hungry, Blood comes to the aid of Spike, a young female solo. He telepathically helps her target and shoot a member of a stalking roverpack, and assists her in escaping from them. They meet in person in a cave by the seashore and agree to work together after getting to know each other.

The next day, they encounter a dilapidated farmhouse guarded by a crazed old man armed with a laser rifle. Against Blood's advice, Spike climbs up the farmhouse and drops in through a hole in the roof. She keeps the laser rifle, finds canned food, and it is ambiguously implied that she killed the old man and cooked his flesh on a rotisserie spit outside the farmhouse. At night, a child minstrel named Poke comes to their campfire and tells them of a Walmart Food Center warehouse surrounded by several roverpacks in exchange for a piece of meat. Blood decides that he and Spike should go see for themselves if the warehouse is real or not.

At dawn the following day, Spike and Blood leave Poke sleeping at the campsite and try to find the Walmart. That night they come to the ridge of a giant crater bowl, and can see the Walmart half-buried in the ground. The campfires of roughly seventeen roverpacks, and about as many solos surround the building's entrance. Blood understands that the situation is a standoff, and matters are further complicated when Vic arrives on the scene alive and well, having escaped the giant spiders depicted in Run, Spot, Run, but offering no explanation as to how he accomplished such a feat.

After arguing and physically fighting, Vic grabs Spike's rifle and holds her at gunpoint. Explaining that he is out of ammo, Vic intends to sneak past the roverpaks and break into the warehouse. Spike and Blood follow, rescuing Vic from attacking rovers and carrying him back to camp. Blood convinces Vic that the three of them have the best chance of survival if they join forces, to which Vic reluctantly agrees. Blood infiltrates the rover camps, speaking individually with various dogs, instructing them to notify their masters of a parley to resolve the standoff. When Vic and Blood arrive at the parley, their mortal enemy Fellini is present, attended by two muscular litter bearers named Ratch and Victory. Negotiations initially seem productive until Fellini threatens to instigate a full-scale shootout unless his two terms are met; his terms being that he would be allowed to keep all the pudding cans in the warehouse, and that Vic is to be turned over to him. The majority agree to his terms, and Vic demands one-on-one trial by combat to the death for his freedom. Fellini accepts, but names his litter bearer Victory as his champion against Vic.

Vic is on the verge of defeat by Fellini's litter bearer when Blood pounces on Fellini, causing a ruckus among the assembled rovers and solos. The two are subdued, and Fellini demands that Vic tell him what (apart from supplies) is in the warehouse. Vic refuses, and Victory beats him for the information. He does not yield until Fellini threatens Blood at gunpoint; Vic tells Fellini (from Blood's instructions) that there are Screamers in the warehouse. Fellini orders Vic and Blood to be lowered into the warehouse to flush out and fight any Screamers inside. Meanwhile, Spike has burned a hole in the side of the building with the laser rifle, and has been loading sacks with food, water, and ammunition as part of Blood's overall plan. Vic is upset to learn his part in the plan was a diversion, but Blood calms him down. Spike climbs a rope out of the building, but before Vic and Blood climb out, three Screamers appear in the doorway. Vic throws a torch at them, igniting one and spreading flames which catch on to dried wooden crates. Vic climbs up with Blood in tow as the rope catches fire, but begins to succumb to the heat and smoke just as Spike reaches in and helps pull him and Blood through the hole. Vic later saves Spike from pursuing rovers, and the three escape into the night.

The story concludes with Vic, Blood, and Spike camped out by the seashore, where Blood suggests they head east to try and find safe haven. Vic rejects the idea as more of Blood's delusional talk of the mythical "over the hill." He storms off, refusing to work with Spike or Blood ever again; Spike's meanness, and Blood's deception in the plan to enter the Walmart are his reasons for leaving. Spike and Blood share a knowing smile, and follow Vic along the beach. Blood describes the events of the Watergate scandal to Vic and Spike as the trio continue traveling along the beach.

== Legacy ==
The film adaptation was an influence on Love and Monsters (2020) by Michael Matthews.

The story and its film adaptation have also been mentioned to be influential in the creation of both George Miller's Mad Max film franchise and the Fallout video game series by Black Isle Studios.
