= Miss Caroline =

Miss Caroline: The Little Girl in the Big White House was a comic strip about a fictionalized version of Caroline Kennedy, the daughter of John F. Kennedy, who at the time was five years old. Editor & Publisher noted that the heads of Caroline's parents were never shown on panel.

Written by Gerald Gardner and drawn by Frank B. Johnson, the strip was published in newspapers beginning on November 4, 1963, and was abruptly cancelled following the assassination of Caroline's father on November 22. (Note: Although most newspapers published their last installment of Miss Caroline on November 22, 1963, comic strip historian Allan Holtz found one newspaper that published the November 23 installment as well.)

The strip was launched to capitalize on the commercial success of Gardner and Johnson's book of cartoons Miss Caroline, which was published in January 1963 by Gold Medal Books, and sold 250,000 copies by July of that year.

== Collections ==
In 2012, About Comics announced that they would be reprinting the complete Miss Caroline.
