= Sean Martin (cartoonist) =

American-Canadian cartoonist (1950–2020)

- Born: December 29, 1950
- Died: August 3, 2020 (aged 69)
- Area: Cartoonist
- Notable works: Doc and Raider

Sean Stephane Martin (December 29, 1950 – August 3, 2020) was an American-Canadian cartoonist, illustrator, and graphic designer, best known for creating the long-running Doc and Raider comic strip which appeared in LGBT publications in the 1980s and 1990s, and online in the 2000 and 2010s.

== Early life ==
Martin was adopted as a child. His adoptive mother, Elsie Martin, who died in 2017, estimated his birth date as 29 December 1960 based on the date he was taken from a Catholic-run orphanage in Montreal. She also believed that he was born in Canada. He was raised in Texas, and lived in New York City and San Francisco before moving to Canada in 1986 and gaining Canadian citizenship in 1989.

== Career ==
Martin produced the first Doc and Raider strips for a Vancouver gay publication in 1987. The titular characters' namesakes come from western novels written by J.D. Hardin Although the issue featuring Doc and Raider turned out to be the final issue of that publication, the strip was quickly picked up by other LGBT publications, including the Xtra! newspapers in Canada. Martin's fee for the strip was turned over to charities and organizations, going to causes that included AIDS hospices in New Zealand, and an arts festival in Scotland, with total donations estimated to be close to a quarter million dollars (US) (Exact figures are unknown because of variances in the number of currencies and irregularity of reporting involved, but it is a reliable estimate). The characters have also been used to promote safer-sex practices and AIDS education, as well as rodeos, country dance conventions, and film festivals. His works have often alluded to other queer comics artists of the past such as Tom of Finland by dressing up his characters as authority figures and highlighting their sexuality. He has also written about domestic relationships, as can be seen in Gay Comix #16, through the bickering between Doc and Raider. Martin was an avid lover of cats and they often were woven into his narratives.

He published two books collecting strips: Doc and Raider: Caught on Tape (1994) and Doc and Raider: Incredibly Lifelike (1996). He retired the regular strip in 1997, but drew two five-page stories for the Little Sister's Defence Fund anthologies What's Right and What's Wrong in 2002. The strip's archive is housed at the National Archives of Canada and the Pride Archives at the University of Western Ontario. Martin later revived the strip online, using digitally-rendered art from 3D models, and has published a number of anthologies, including "Canadian: Hope That's Okay", "Tastefully Canadian", and "Frankly Canadian". This transition to a new medium of art came about from an undisclosed injury to Martin's drawing hand. Martin would use this new outlet to provide modern political commentary and has responded to tragedies such as the Pulse nightclub shooting. Some of this artwork draws from Eastern art influences as evidenced by the large eyes given to some of his figures, reminiscent of manga.

Martin wrote a manual for theatre designers, Big Show Tiny Budget, based on his years as a scenic and costume designer, a novella Triptych, and adaptations of classic theatre scripts, including The Prince of Pilsen, The Pink Lady, and The Black Crook. He has also issued a volume of standalone illustrations of life in Montréal, under the title of "Les citains", as well as publications of Candide, Gilgamesh, The Little Prince, and Aesop's Fables. While living in Calgary, Martin worked with the Alberta Rockies Gay Rodeo, providing graphic design for the organization's posters and brochures. His work was honoured in 2001 with a Lifetime Achievement Award from the International Gay Rodeo Association. Martin's illustration work for Candide is part of the permanent Voltaire collection at the University of Wittenberg.

== Death ==
Martin ended the digital version of Doc and Raider on July 13, 2020, with its 5600th installment. He died of complications of pancreatic cancer following hospice care on August 3, 2020.

== Legacy ==
Martin was one of the first to work with theater designers remotely. He was a pioneer in his field when he transitioned to 3-D art and many of his drawings can still be found on his Coroflot page Doc and Raider now stands as one of the longest running LGBTQ comic strips in history as well as the second longest Canadian one, after For Better or For Worse. Martin continues to hold an online presence through the support of family and friends.

== Archives ==
There is a collection of drawings by Sean Martin at Library and Archives Canada. The collection consists of 22 original cartoons focusing on issues relating to the gay lifestyle and gay politics with references to broader social and political events. The drawings were published worldwide in various gay magazines and papers on a freelance basis. The archival reference number is 1991-311 DAP. The drawings date from 1989-1991.
