= Our Story: A Memoir of Love and Life in China =

2013 memoir by Rao Pingru

- First edition
- Author: Rao Pingru
- Translator: Nicky Harman
- Language: Chinese
- Publisher: Guangxi Normal University Press
- Publication date: 2018
- Publication place: China

Our Story: A Memoir of Love and Life in China is a memoir written by Rao Pingru and originally published in Chinese by Guangxi Normal University Press. It was translated into English by Nicky Harman and published in 2018 by Pantheon. The book comprises eighteen volumes of text and colored drawings, with about half of the book using each type, in 350 pages. Most of the drawings show wide angles while some are close-ups. The text includes letters written by Mao Meitang, Rao Pingru's wife. Porter Shreve of the San Francisco Chronicle describes them as "quotidian treasures" that "serve as a coda to the book".

== Content ==
The beginning of the memoir has the childhood of Rao Pingru in the 1930s, when he lived in Nancheng. He served as a soldier for the Kuomintang (KMT) in the Second Sino-Japanese War and the Chinese Civil War in the following decade; he headed a platoon while in the service of the KMT. He fought Japanese forces but never encountered Communist ones. In Spring 1946, he decides to marry Meitang, who he knew since childhood. He married her in 1948 while on leave.

After the war, Rao Pingru initially was a free man even though his side did not win the war, as he had destroyed photographs of himself wearing KMT military clothing. In 1958 Rao Pingru went to a labor camp, in Anhui, due to his previous KMT allegiance. At the camp he performed difficult manual labor. He left the camp in 1980. He and his family moved to Shanghai. Meitang, who had diabetes, died in 2008, prompting Rao Pingru to begin making creative works to celebrate their union. The memoir's content ends in the 2000s. By 2018, Rao Pingru, 95 at the time, was still in Shanghai.

== Reception ==
Publishers Weekly stated that the book is an "exquisite, visually dazzling memoir".
