= Den (comics) =

- Cover to Neverwhere trade paperback (1978), featuring Den, Kath, and Uhluhtc.

Publication information
- Publisher: Last Gasp Ltd. Ariel Books; Catalan Communications; Métal Hurlant; Heavy Metal; Fantagor Press; Penthouse Comix
- First appearance: In animation: Neverwhere (animated short, 1968); In print: Grim Wit #2 (September 1973)
- Created by: Richard Corben
- Voiced by: John Candy

In-story information
- Alter ego: David Ellis Norman
- Place of origin: Earth, Neverwhere
- Partnerships: Kath, the Red Queen
- Abilities: Peak human strength, speed, durability, agility, reflexes and senses; Great martial artist and hand-to-hand combatant; Prodigiously sexually endowed

Den is the name of two identical sword and planet fictional characters created by Richard Corben. The first appeared in the 1968 animated short film Neverwhere. The second has been appearing in comics since 1973, and in short stories that have been collected for the most part in trade paperbacks.

The second Den also appeared in the animated film Heavy Metal voiced by John Candy.

== Publication history ==
Corben created Den as the protagonist of a film short titled Neverwhere while working at Calvin Studios, an animation company in Kansas City. The film is animated, with framing sequences filmed in live-action. Corben's boss at Calvin played the title character in the movie. He drew the whole animated sequence by hand in his spare time. His employers, impressed by his work, helped him to finish it by editing it and adding a new professional soundtrack with actors' voices. It was submitted to film festivals and won several awards, including the CINE Golden Eagle Award. The story continued in comic form from then on. Den made his comic debut in a short comic book story that appeared in Grim Wit No.2 in September 1973. Corben expanded this short story to two parts for publication in Métal Hurlant (1975–1976). He continued the story, turning it into a 12-part serial called "Den", for the first twelve issues of Heavy Metal magazine (1977–1978). He added an epilogue, "Den's Farewell", which was printed in issue No.13 (April 1978). The original story, without the epilogue, was published in the trade paperback Neverwhere (Ariel: Feb. 1978). All 13 chapters featured in the trade paperback Den: Neverwhere (Catalan: 1984).

Corben returned to Heavy Metal with a 13-part Den sequel, which ran in issues No.54 through No.72 (1981–1983). These stories were collected in the trade paperback Den 2: Muvovum (Catalan: 1984), which appeared around the same time as the complete first edition, Den: Neverwhere.

Corben began self-publishing Den through his company Fantagor Press in the 1980s, beginning with Children of Fire (1987) which was later revealed to be the prequel to the Heavy Metal-era Den adventures. Corben followed this with an ongoing Den series, which did not have the full frontal nudity that was the hallmark of the original Heavy Metal strips. Corben went back to the adult content with Den Saga, which filled in some of the details between Children of Fire and Neverwhere and Muvovum.

== Appearances ==
The short film Neverwhere (1968) was followed by short stories in the following publications:

- Fantagor No.4 (1972) – "For the Love of a Daemon"
- Grim Wit No.2 (1973) – "Den"
- Heavy Metal No.1-13 (April 1977 thru April 1978) – collected in Den 1: Neverwhere
- Heavy Metal No.54-72 (1981–1983) – collected in Den 2: Muvovum
- Children of Fire No.1-3 (1987–1988) - collected in Den 3: Children of Fire,
- Den ("Fantastic Adventures!") No.1-10 (1988–1989) – collected in Den 3: Children of Fire, Den 4: Dreams and Den 5: Elements
- DenSaga No.1-4 (1992–1994) (not collected in English)
- Penthouse Comix No.15-20 (1996–1997) – "Denz" (not collected)

They have been collected in the following Den trade paperbacks:

- Neverwhere (1978, 1985, 1991)
- Muvovum (1984, 1991)
- Children of Fire (1992)
- Dreams (1992)
- Elements (1992)

== Fictional character biography ==
Grim Wit #2 (1973), featuring the first appearance in print of Den.

"Den" is the name of two characters: the hero featured in the short film Neverwhere; and the identical hero featured in all the subsequent comics.

=== First version ===
The first Den story, as told in the short film Neverwhere, is clearly inspired by the Edgar Rice Burroughs John Carter of Mars novels. In the beginning of the film, an office worker is shown reading the 1963 reprint of A Princess of Mars, before he is turned down for a date by a coworker and quits his job. He then builds a machine that opens a portal where a "deposed queen" beckons him to enter another world. Turning into a muscleman he fights several monsters, including four armed monsters reminiscent of Burroughs’ Green Martians. Den is then sent on a mission by the Queen to retrieve the Locnar and, after succeeding, returns home to his mundane life.

=== Second version ===
In its comic-book sequel, Den is a young man named David Ellis Norman. Following directions left for him on a note and a diagram from his missing uncle Dan, David builds another electronic apparatus. The apparatus opens a gateway to a fantasy world named "Neverwhere", where he was transformed into a hairless, nude, muscular, and prodigiously endowed adventurer. Confused by his strange trip, he can only remember the acronym of his real name (DEN), and begins calling himself "Den". In his Earth incarnation, David had found a letter in one of the fantasy novels by Edgar Rice Burroughs left to him by his uncle Dan. Some images from the Neverwhere film are recreated in the first volume of Den as flashbacks.

Shortly after his arrival he meets an evil nude masked woman, known as the Red Queen who seems to know Den and is about to sacrifice her doppelgänger Kath to the powerful non-human entity Uhluhtc. After being rescued by Den, Kath reveals to him that, on Earth, she is a frail novelist called Katherine Wells (a reference to H. G. Wells, whose second wife was named Catherine). Kath is a native of London who, in 1892, was drawn to Neverwhere when she found another doorway after following the will o' the wisp while wandering through some marshes. Like Den, she was transformed when she arrived to Neverwhere, in her case into a voluptuous, large breasted nude woman who was immediately captured by the Red Queen (who had created the portal to bring her to Neverwhere). Kath has a much better recollection of her former life than Den, but doesn't wish to return because she feels she is not only healthier but "more of a woman" in the new land. Like Den, she is completely nude and hairless except for her blond bob hairstyle.

According to Jan Strnad's introduction to Denz, "The saga of Den's exploits... lusty and brawling, brimming with magic, intrigue, horror and betrayal... spanned generations and filled many exotic volumes. Now in his declining years, Den lives in a NeverWhere far different from the one he entered. Thanks to his magical Locnar, Den has brought peace and prosperity to his adoptive world. Meanwhile, on Earth, Denzel Easton Norman seeks to follow in his brother's footsteps...."

== Characters ==
Fantagor #4 (1972), featuring the first appearance in print of what will become the Neverwhere world, Vermian (an exact double for the series villain Zeg) and Zomuk.

The identification of the main characters of the series is complicated because they often change their name, drastically change morphologies, have identical doubles (also both Dens have the same name), and either forget, or do not acknowledge, previous encounters. Most problematically they also radically change personalities and relationships between the chapters in the story. An extreme case is Kil, who is consecutively portrayed as a noble sexless warrior, a maternal caretaker of an embryo, a lustful lover, a deposed queen with magical powers, an evil witch who engages in human sacrifice, a ruthless tyrant who burns down a city, a fraudulent heroic adventurer, etc. According to Corben, this is due to Kil's psychotic schizophrenia.

The protagonists are basically two identical men — Den (the first) and Den (the second) — and two identical women — Kil and Kath. They are all known by several other aliases:

- Den (first) also known as Mal, Uncle Dan, Daniel Norman. First appeared in Neverwhere the Movie.
- Den (second) also known as David Ellis Norman, Dav. First appeared in Grim Wit No.2.
- Kil also known as the Queen, the Red Queen. First appeared (as the Queen) in Neverwhere the Movie.
- Kath also known as Katherine Wells. First appeared in Heavy Metal No.4.

The main secondary recurring characters are:

- Zeg, an evil wizard/warlord. Father of Scon. First appeared in Heavy Metal No.13.
- Zomuk, Zeg's demon slave. First appeared in Fantagor No.4.
- Pucca, Zeg's slave cook. Mate of Mal. First appeared in Children of Fire No.2.
- Gel, the simian humanoid leader of a revolt against the Red Queen. First appeared in Neverwhere the Movie.
- Scon, son of Zeg, also a wizard/warlord. First appeared in Heavy Metal No.55.
- Sienna, an Indian girl with mental powers. She has a giant lizard named Pthalo. First appeared in Grim Wit No.2.
- Zandor and Wyn, blue humanoid father and daughter. First appeared in Heavy Metal No.65.
- Queen Ryllia, the human/fish hybrid queen of Ichthya, an underwater city. First appeared in Den No.5.

== Chronology of the stories ==
Den No.1 (1988)

Den's adventures follow a complex and sometimes contradictory course of events. Some of the chapters of the story have been told in extended flashbacks, dreams, and visions. This is the order of the stories so far. There are three large gaps between the stories with adventures that have yet to be told.

- Den 3: Children of Fire (1989). The planet Zomere is inhabited by an eusocial species similar to humans but oviparous. A breeding queen rules them. Females are non-sexual muscular warriors called Kils or workers called Works, and males are called Mals. After an attack by giant spiders the dying queen sends a Kil, a pre-queen simply named "Kil", to found a new colony in Dremurth (Neverwhere) bringing with her Mals, Works, and eggs to seek the "Magic Scepter" (the Locnar). The ship crashes and only Kil and a skeletal Mal (named "Mal", who will become the first Den) survive. Their only remaining egg produces a human baby, the second Den. Once they land they meet Zeg, a Vermian lookalike, Zomuk and his slave cook Pucca who live in Vermian's castle from the prequel. At the end of the story, Zeg kidnaps a pregnant Pucca and the second Den, and Mal kills Zomuk.
- DenSaga No.2-4 (1992–1993). Three or four years later, the second Den is now an infant called David, and the first Den has fully transformed into a hyper-muscular body and now calls himself Daniel, Dan, or Uncle Dan. The second Den lives in a floating island called Heaven, ruled by Zeg, with Pucca, who is raising him. Pucca is also raising a daughter she had with the first Den, named Elinorma. Kil returns also, fully transformed into a leaner body with a very large bosom. According to Corben, the radiation from her spaceship transformed Kil into a hybrid of breeding queen and warrior. By the end of the story, the first Den (Mal) leaves with Kil in pursuit of Zeg, who has kidnapped the second Den, and Pucca flees with Elinorma.
- Neverwhere the Movie (1968). The first Den is now a thin, bespectacled man living on Earth. He builds a machine that opens a portal to Neverwhere. There he meets the Queen (they do not seem to know each other from when they were Kil and Mal). The Queen tells him that she is deposed and sends him on a mission to retrieve the Locnar, a magical scepter, from Gel, a humanoid monster, who declares that Den is the latest of several champions sent by the Queen. After he succeeds, the Queen returns Den to Earth in his thin form.
- Den 1: Neverwhere (1978). The second Den appears in Neverwhere without any previous memories of his childhood there. He believes his uncle, the first Den, left him directions on how to recreate the machine that opens the portal to this world. There he meets the Red Queen, with whom he has sex after being captured by her; Kath (brought to Neverwhere to be sacrificed to Uhluhtc, like Merya in the prequel), whom he rescues and with whom he falls in love, having a brief idyll with her; and Gel, whom he eventually kills. He also receives a visit from the first Den, who materializes and then disappears. At the end of the story, the second Den saves Zeg (called Zek in the comic) from certain death at the hands of the Red Queen, although Den is himself captured. The Red Queen orally rapes Den, but he is ultimately rescued by Kath. During his rescue, Den fatefully chooses to save the Red Queen from falling to her death. Four years will pass until the return of the Red Queen in Den 2.

Penthouse Comix No.15 (1996). The latest chapter in the Den saga is a satirical series written by Jan Strnad. Cover art by creator Richard Corben.

- Den 2: Muvovum (1983). The second Den and Kath are now living on another floating island, Zegium, ruled by Zeg. Kath and the second Den return to Earth. The Red Queen appears and kills Zeg. The second Den then comes back to Neverwhere. He eventually is rejoined with a woman whom he believes to be Kath.
- Den 4: Dreams (1992). Four or five years later, the woman whom Den believes to be Kath has left him and, depressed, he has become obese and feeble. By the end of the story, he begins to transform back into his former, muscular self.
- Den 5: Elements (1992). Back in top, strapping shape, the second Den is reunited with a woman whom he believes to be Kath, who actually talks like she is Kil. Eventually, she is revealed to indeed be Kil, the Red Queen. She has brought Kath back to Neverwhere and when asked to choose between them, Den chooses the Red Queen. After a great explosion at the end of the story, Den is alone and unconscious and is rescued by his friends Zandor and Wyn.
- "The Price of Memories" (DenSaga No.1, 1992), "Bog's Deal" (Heavy Metal No.141, 1992), "Mola the Mole" (Heavy Metal No.145, 1993), "The Light at the End of the Tunnel" (Heavy Metal No.149, 1994). Amnesiac, the second Den runs into Sienna, whom he met before in the opening of Grim Wit No.4. She takes care of him and helps him begin to remember his history, from the moment of birth from the egg brought to Neverwhere by Kil and Mal. Eventually, Sienna claims she has no more tales to tell him, and they part ways.
- Denz (Penthouse Comix No.15-20, 1996–1997). Years later, the second Den is now the ruler of Neverwhere and is visited by his brother Denzel Easton Norman, incarnated into the third "almost" Den, who is called "Denz". This last part varies in tone from the rest of the story; it is a comedy and the characters are drawn more like caricatures than in any of the previous chapters. Den's and Sienna's faces are now grotesquely old.

== Influences ==
The stories of Den are shaped by several works of fiction. Sometimes the references are featured within the story itself.

- A Princess of Mars by Edgar Rice Burroughs. The screen story of Corben's short film Neverwhere, as well as the whole concept behind its Den character, is based on the novel and its sequels, the first in Burrough's Barsoom series. The 1963 Ace Books edition of A Princess of Mars is featured in the film, and the novels are mentioned in the first Den comics story. Den gets a new body that is perfect and, like the characters in the Barsoom novels, everyone, including himself, remains naked for the entire adventure. This aspect of the story was retained in the subsequent comic versions, unlike the Burroughs’ comics adaptations. Furthermore, with the relaxed social mores for depicting sexuality arising at the time of the Den series' inception, the erotic possibilities of Neverwhere are eagerly indulged by the characters. Kil and both Dens come from a planet whose inhabitants resemble Homo sapiens in most respects, except for being oviparous, like all Barsoomian races.
- The Wizard of Oz. As pointed out by Philip José Farmer Den, like Dorothy Gale, travels to a strange world and is sent on a mission, eventually returning to his former existence on Earth. Like Dorothy, Den is from Kansas.
- The stories of Robert E. Howard. Before completing the first Den collection, Corben adapted a short story by Howard, "Bloodstar", where the muscular hero fought an amorphous, demonic creature, similar to Uhluhtc.
- The tales of H. P. Lovecraft. Particularly in the first volume of Den, the presence of Uhluhtc (Cthulhu spelled backwards) is a constant theme throughout the story. Uhluhtc is also mentioned in "For the Love of a Daemon" and Children of Fire.
- The Lord of the Rings by J.R.R. Tolkien. As pointed out by SidSid Keränen, the Nar stones and the scepter made from them, the Locnar, are similar to the One Ring and its corrupting power.

== Critical response ==
Most critics have commented on the rather uneven and clichéd plot of the story and its visual power. Scholar Maurice Horn remarked that Den 1 "sounds like a lot of hokum ... but it is saved by Corben's astonishing graphic mastery and the sweep of his composition". Román Gubern considers that, "Den's brilliant experimentalism appeared tinted by a Neo-expressionist influence". Tim Pilcher calls Den "Conan on Viagra". Historian Paul Gravett thinks that "Corben's plotting may be erratic and prone to charges of sexism and cliché, but his total conviction and self-absorption in imagining this sensual dreamscape captivate and transport us there".

After analyzing all of Corben's major works, Alberto García Marcos wrote, "Den's stories seem to wander aimlessly, with a minimal plot that weaves scenes of heroism, sex and action while giving unlimited power to the imagination of the author in the design of scenes and characters and the graphic experimentation. And graphically they do have great impact, but taken as a whole ... they are more or less ... mental masturbation". Author Samuel R. Delany agrees with the importance of the visuals in Den and its basic lack of plot.

D. Aviva Rothschild wrote about the first volume, "Although coherent and interesting, the story takes second place to Corben's lush, magnificent, fully painted, animation-quality art". Rothschild believes that the only problem with the book is "the ludicrously large breasts of the two women..." but considers that Neverwhere "belongs in all adult collections...." Artist Bob Fingerman writes that, "Neverwhere is a timeless adult fantasy epic". According to the Lambiek online comiclopedia, "With 'Den', Corben had found his ideal fantasy world. Corben returned again and again to it, and an end of 'Den' is not to be foreseen".

Antonio Sánchez Rodríguez pondered Corben's comments of the character Den being his imagined alter ego, interpreting him as being conceived to oppose sexual repression through desinhibition and deliberate hypersexualization. He also commented on women's portrayal in Den, noting that although they weren't classical, strong heroines or warrior women, they are independent and capable of employing their intelligence and sexuality to triumph. They act to fulfill their own sexual desire, just like Den.

== Film adaptation ==
The film Heavy Metal features a segment titled "Den" that adapts the first Den collection, Den 1: Neverwhere (not to be confused with the animated short of the same title). The film eliminates the Uncle Dan part of the story and incorporates a green meteorite as a portal to Neverwhere. Small details are changed (Kath is now from Gibraltar), some concessions to appease the MPAA from giving the film an "X" rating such as the main characters wearing small loin garments (which playfully disappear for the female leads in long shots and when they are not depicted frontally, leaving them fully nude), some characters and subplots are eliminated, but the segment follows the plot of the comic story fairly closely. The biggest difference is the tone: the animated segment is told in a self-referential, humorous style, with Den as an innocent teenage science enthusiast reveling in living a wild sexual fantasy with an idealized body, different from the straight forward adventure tone of the comic. In fact, the segment is similar in tone to "Denz", which makes fun of many of the absurdities of the Neverwhere premise. Den is voiced by comedic actor John Candy. To highlight the segment's humorous tone, the script has Den speaking directly to both characters and also in contrasting voice-overs. In one, he is dead serious and strong willed, matching his epic existence on Neverwhere; in the other he sounds adolescent, reflecting on his life on Earth. The rest of the voice cast consists of Jackie Burroughs as Katherine Wells, Martin Lavut as Ard, Marilyn Lightstone as the Queen, and August Schellenberg as Norl. This adaptation has been compared in its idea to The Wizard of Oz by critic Chris Hicks, who says the story is, "about two children changed into fantasy adults with a 'bring-me-the-broomstick-of-the-wicked-witch'-style mission, etc". Jack Stokes, the veteran animator of the film Yellow Submarine, was put in charge of the production.

A studio was set up in London because, according to Stokes "many animators are not good artists", meaning they are not skilled in drawing the human figure realistically, and art students were recruited to pitch in on the production. This accounts for the lack of consistency in the characters' likenesses. Corben painted the poster for the film and was asked to contribute to the production. He drew three character sheet turnarounds for Den and Kath, but these were not usable due to "inconsistencies in the construction". Still, the animators tried to recreate the look of the comic by developing several techniques to reproduce the unusual colors of Corben's artwork.

The segment was well received, even by critics who did not think much of the film. Critic Janet Maslin gave the film a positive review in The New York Times. She said, "The other highly memorable story is about a bookworm from earth who winds up on another planet, where his spindly body is transformed into that of an extraterrestrial Hercules". She also complimented John Candy's vocal performance as Den. Corben wrote about the film, "I was pleased with the Den segment of the Heavy Metal Movie. The drawings and movement seemed stiff, rough and unpolished, but the thrust and characters were right. I thought that John Candy did a great job with Den's voice."

== Sources ==
- Balfour, Brad (June 1981). "The Richard Corben Interview, Part 1". Heavy Metal (51): 6–11.
- Balfour, Brad (July 1981). "The Richard Corben Interview, Part 2". Heavy Metal (52): 8–14.
- Bharucha, Feshid (1981). Richard Corben: Flights Into Fantasy. Thumb Tack Books. ISBN 84-499-1949-5.
- Bissette, Stephen R.; Stanley Wiater (1993). Comic Book Rebels: Conversations with the Creators of New Comics. Donald I. Fine, Inc. ISBN 1-55611-354-4.
- Garriock, P. R. (1978). Masters of Comic Book Art. Aurum Press, Ltd. ISBN 0-905664-05-1.
- Oliver, Agustín (2004). Richard Corben (Un rebelde tranquilo). Sinsentido. ISBN 84-95634-51-1.
- Richardson, John Adkins (1977). The Complete Book of Cartooning. Prentice-Hall, Inc. ISBN 0-13-157594-5.
- Van Hise, James (1989). How to Draw Art for Comic Books: Lessons from the Masters. Pioneer Books, Inc. ISBN 1-55698-254-2.
