= Bloodstar =

1976 graphic novel

- Cover of the first edition of Bloodstar by Richard Corben
- Date: 1976
- Main characters: Bloodstar
- Page count: 104 pages
- Publisher: The Morning Star Press

Creative team
- Writers: Robert E. Howard
- Artists: Richard Corben
- Creators: Robert E. Howard, John Jakes, Richard Corben
- Editors: Armand Eisen, Gil Kane

Original publication
- Published in: "The Valley of the Worm," Weird Tales (February 1934)
- Language: English
- ISBN: 9781135830595

Bloodstar is an American fantasy comic book published in 1976. Possibly the first graphic novel to call itself a “graphic novel” in print (in its introduction and dust jacket), it was based on a short story by Robert E. Howard, the creator of Conan the Barbarian, and illustrated by fantasy artist Richard Corben. The book was published by The Morning Star Press in a limited signed and numbered edition.

== Status as first self-described graphic novel ==
The front flap of its dust jacket reads: "BLOODSTAR is a new, revolutionary concept – a graphic novel, which combines all the imagination and visual power of comic strip art with the richness of the traditional novel."

Two other books published the same year (1976) also called themselves graphic novels, but one is a reprint collection of a serialized underground comic (George Metzger's Beyond Time and Again) and the other is really an illustrated novel (Jim Steranko's Chandler: Red Tide)

Unlike Beyond Time and Again, Bloodstar is a long story that had not been previously published episodically. It was first printed as a luxury hardcover edition and subsequently reprinted in several trade paperback editions.

== Background and creation ==
The story is an adaptation of Robert E. Howard's original short story "The Valley of the Worm", which appeared for the first time in Weird Tales (February 1934 issue). This story had been previously adapted to comics in a version written by Roy Thomas and Gerry Conway, pencilled by Gil Kane and inked by Ernie Chan for Supernatural Thrillers #3 (1973). This version gave the name "Helga" to the unnamed character of a "naked tousle-headed girl" described by Howard. In Bloodstar she became "Helva" and is the romantic interest of the protagonist. Since he pencilled this first comics version, it may have been Gil Kane's idea to turn "The Valley of the Worm" into a longer format sequential adaptation. Originally Bloodstar was going to be titled "King of the Northern Abyss". The first chapter of Bloodstar appears to be inspired by H. G. Wells' short story, The Star. According to an interview with Corben in Heavy Metal magazine, Armand Eisen and Gil Kane contacted Corben and asked him if he wanted to work on the book. Gil Kane changed the hero's name from "Niord" to "Bloodstar" and then created the design for a star mark on his forehead. Kane edited the book with Armand Eisen. Originally The Morning Star Press was going to publish adaptations of two other Robert E. Howard stories: Skull-Face and Swords of the Red Brotherhood. John Jakes expanded the story adding much material to it and then Richard Corben revised, rewrote it and added further content. A latter edition (1979) was rewritten by John Pocsik.

Although Corben stated in 1981 that Bloodstar was his favorite story up to that point, he initially hesitated to take the assignment, finding the characters in "The Valley of the Worm" lacking in depth. Corben's adaptation of the story adds humanity and romance to Howard's brutal fights and action sequences.

Bloodstar is a post-apocalyptic sword and sorcery tale of the life of a mythical hero and his heritage. It is illustrated in black and white in mixed media in startlingly three-dimensional looking images rendered in airbrush, markers and colored pencils and features some ground breaking narrative sequences. The artwork took about nine months to complete, and according to Berni Wrightson, Corben painted the cover in less than 24 hours, while Wrightson and Bruce Jones were visiting him in Kansas City. Corben was later commissioned to color the story, but had assistants do it following his method, probably Herb and Diana Arnold. This color version appeared serialized in Heavy Metal 45–52, but was never collected in English.

== The influence of film on Richard Corben's comic art ==
The introduction from the original 1976 hardcover edition of Bloodstar discusses the influence of the visual arts and especially filmmaking on Richard Corben's work in Bloodstar.

"Bloodstar marks a great leap forward for the art of the comic strip through its revolutionary synthesis of ideas and art forms. In this book, the imagination and visual power of comic art are wedded to the complexity and depth of the traditional novel, producing an enthralling hybrid which might best be labeled – the graphic novel." The introduction continues, "The dazzling illustrations of artist-adaptor Richard Corben imbue the hero, Bloodstar, with the throbbing, tormented life force of a Rodin sculpture and animate each panel with the visual intensity of an Orson Welles film." The introduction goes on, "Just like a cinematographer, the cartoonist pans, tilts, and zooms from angles which best accomplishes his dramatic purpose ... Corben employs "camera movement" to give his narrative a rhythmic flow and a tension. Conversely, the influence of animated film can be seen most strongly in Corben stories which contain a great deal of violent, physical movement. His drawings leap, run, and fight with an extraordinary feeling of authenticity which, undoubtedly, arises from his study of the principles of movement in film animation."

== Critical reception ==
Some writers have commented that Bloodstar is the most successful adaptation of a Robert E. Howard story. James Van Hise wrote, "...I believe that it is the only time someone has rewritten Howard and retained the atmosphere and the subtext while also transforming it in to something as good as the original, however different it is in substantial ways." D. Aviva Rothschild agrees, calling Bloodstar "pulp adventure fiction brought to life by a master illustrator... much more interesting, both textually and artistically, than the insipid Conan adaptations by Marvel." Comics historian Maurice Horn believes that Bloodstar is "A bizarre commingling of Greek and Norse mythologies, with a light admixture of science fiction, it embodies the sum of Corben's fantasies and nightmares in its fantastic array of repulsive-looking monsters, incredibly muscled heroes and impossibly big-busted maidens. Bloodstar also embodies Corben's peculiar vision of heroic sex and heroic death as the twin saviors of mankind." In contrast, critic Agustín Oliver comments regarding Bloodstar that "sexual activity is infrequent in Corben's work; when it appears it is usually depicted as delicate and tender." Alberto García Marcos, who wrote a long analysis of Corben's career, considers Bloodstar his masterpiece.

== Editions in English ==
- First edition: 1976. The Morning Star Press, Leawood, Kansas. Hardcover. Story by Robert E. Howard. Adaptation by Richard Corben and John Jakes. Art by Richard Corben. Edited by Armand Eisen and Gil Kane. Design by Richard Corben. The Morning Star Press Ltd. broke up shortly after this edition was published.
- Second edition: ISBN 0-671-25209-7 Sept. 1979. Ariel Books, New York. Paperback. Same credits as the first edition, except new lettering: James Warhola, associate editor:Joe Kelly and design: Bruce Jones. This edition is rewritten by John Pocsik. This second edition features a more contrasted reproduction inferior to the first one, but it contains a new double page spread in the title page featuring the main characters that was not present in the first edition.

== Sources ==
- Balfour, Brad (June 1981). "The Richard Corben Interview, Part 1". Heavy Metal (51): 6–11.
- Balfour, Brad (July 1981). "The Richard Corben Interview, Part 2". Heavy Metal (52): 8–14.
- Bharucha, Feshid (1981). Richard Corben: Flights into Fantasy. Thumb Tack Books. ISBN 84-499-1949-5.
- Bissette, Stephen R.; Wiater, Stanley (1993). Comic Book Rebels: Conversations with the Creators of New Comics. Donald I. Fine, Inc. ISBN 1-55611-354-4.
- Corben, Richard; Howard, Robert E.; Jakes, John (1976). Bloodstar. The Morning Star Press Ltd.
- Corben, Richard; Howard, Robert E.; Jakes, John; Pocsik, John (1979). Bloodstar. Ariel Books. ISBN 0-671-25209-7.
- Garriock, P. R. (1978). Masters of Comic Book Art. Aurum Press, Ltd. ISBN 0-905664-05-1.
- Horn, Maurice (1985). Sex in the Comics. Chelsea House Publishers. ISBN 0-87754-850-1.
- Richardson, John Adkins (1977). The Complete Book of Cartooning. Prentice-Hall, Inc. ISBN 0-13-157594-5.
- Roark, Byron L. (1975). "Interview: Glenn Lord". REH: Lone Star Fictioneer. 1 (1): 36.
- Rothschild, D. Aviva (1995). Graphic Novels: A Bibliographic Guide to Book-Length Comics. Libraries Unlimited. ISBN 1-56308-086-9.
- Sackmann, Eckart (1987). Great Masters of Fantasy Art. Parkwest Pubns. ISBN 3-89268-008-6.
- Seuling, Phil (1975). "The Fantasy Epic: Creating the Graphic Novel". Mediascene (16): 8–9.
- Oliver, Agustín (2004). Richard Corben (Un rebelde tranquilo). Sinsentido. ISBN 84-95634-51-1.
- Van Hise, James (1989). How to Draw Art for Comic Books: Lessons from the Masters. Pioneer Books, Inc. ISBN 1-55698-254-2.
- Van Hise, James (1997). The Fantastic Worlds of Robert E. Howard. James Van Hise.
