= Rao Pingru =

Chinese comic book author (1922–2020)

- 饒平如
- Born: November 1922; Nanchang, Republic of China
- Died: 4 April 2020 (aged 97)
- Occupation: Comic book author

Rao Pingru (Chinese: 饒平如; November 1922 – 4 April 2020) was a Chinese comic book author who wrote the autobiographical love memoir Our Story.

== Biography ==
Rao was born in 1922 in Nanchang. In 1940, he joined the army and was admitted into the Republic of China Military Academy in Chengdu. In 1945, he became a Lieutenant of the 83rd Division of the 100th Infantry of the National Revolutionary Army. In 1948, he married Mao Meitang. That same year, he was appointed Captain. From 1958 to 1979, he served time in a re-education camp in Anhui for his role in the nationalist army. He then worked for awhile as an editor and kept a medical journal. After the death of his wife in 2008, he wrote a book in her memory, learning to draw from the works of Jean-Jacques Sempé. The book, Our Story, was published in China in 2013. In 2017, at the age of 95, he was a guest of honor at the Angoulême International Comics Festival.

== Our Story ==
- 《我俩的故事》(Guilin, 2014)
- 우리는 60년을 연애했습니다 (Korean translation by Hye-sŏn Nam, 2016)
- Notre histoire. Pingru et Meitang (French translation by François Dubois, 2017)
- Our Story. A Memoir of Love and Life in China (English translation by Nicky Harman, 2018)
- La Historia de Pingru y Meitang (Spanish translation by José Antonio Soriano, 2018)
- La nostra storia (Italian translation by Filippo Bernardini, 2018)
- 《平如美棠 : 我倆的故事》 (Taipei, 2018)
