= Comica =

London International Comics Festival

- Status: Defunct
- Genre: Comics
- Frequency: Annual
- Venue: Institute of Contemporary Arts (2003–2009)
- Location: London
- Country: U.K.
- Inaugurated: June 2003; 23 years ago
- Founder: Paul Gravett and John Harris Dunning
- Most recent: 2014; 12 years ago
- Filing status: Nonprofit
- People: "Team Comica": Gravett, Megan Donnolley, Peter Stanbury
- Website: www.comicafestival.com

Comica, the London International Comics Festival, was a comics festival held in London. Organized by Paul Gravett, the festival generally took place over a number of weeks. In the beginning, the festival's main venue was London's Institute of Contemporary Arts (ICA); thus the name, "ComICA".

Comica was held in the spirit of European conventions like the Angoulême International Comics Festival. As such, it was focused on the art and literature of the comics form, and only minimally on related pop-culture expression and merchandising. Comica featured panel discussions, graphic novel release signings, workshops, art exhibits, and film screenings, as well as a one-day small press fair (called Comica Comiket). British and North American comics were the main focus, but each festival highlighted work from other countries, including France, Japan, Korea, Italy, and comics from Eastern Europe.

Another recurring feature of Comica was the awarding of the Comica Graphic Short Story Prize, sponsored by The Observer newspaper, initially in association with publisher Jonathan Cape.

In addition to the festival itself, Comica occasionally produced other comics-related events during the year.

== History ==
As described in the comics news site The Beat, "Comica debuted in 2003 as a collaboration between comics expert Paul Gravett, and curator, co-conspirator, and comics-writer John Harris Dunning for the Institute of Contemporary Arts." The first Comica Festival was held in late June and early July 2003, taking place over a period of ten days.

The theme of the 2004 festival was "Confessions & Convictions," "highlighting the trend towards autobiography and political commentary prevalent in the comics medium." The festival also took place in June over a period of nine days.

There was no festival held in 2005, with the only Comica event being an October panel at the ICA on emerging international graphic novelists, with Jessica Abel, Matt Madden, Igort, Paul Wright, Killoffer, and Junko Mizuno participating.

The Comica Festival returned in 2006, moving to October and taking place over a period of three weeks. (From that point forward, the Comica festival always took place in the fall, usually in October or November.)

2007 saw the introduction of the Comica Comiket Small Press Fair and the Comica Graphic Short Story Prize (which continued to be awarded after Comica's demise).

The 2009 Comica partnered with Ctrl.Alt.Shift, and produced Ctrl.Alt.Shift Unmasks Corruption, a comics anthology edited by Gravett, featuring short stories looking at examples of corruption in the real world. It included contributions by comics creators like Pat Mills, Bryan Talbot, Dave McKean, Woodrow Phoenix, Peter Kuper, Dylan Horrocks, and Dan Goldman. An exhibition was held at London's Lazarides Gallery to mark the launch; the exhibition included examples of misguided previous attempts to produce worthy comic books.

In 2010, Comica became independent, disassociating from the ICA and registering as a nonprofit organization. That same, year Gravett established the Comica Social Club Meet-Up, "a monthly meetup for people interested in comics, manga and graphic novels."

Gravett produced the 2012 Comica with Megan Donnolley and Peter Stanbury.

The 2013 Comica Festival took place October 23–November 16, but prior Comica events that year attracted such guests as Jaime Hernandez, Rutu Modan, Brian Bolland, and Frazer Irving.

The final Comica Festival took place from mid-October to mid-November 2014. Earlier in the year 2014, in August, Comica produced a weekend series of events at the British Library that featured a Comiket as well as "Comica Conversations" with guests like Emmanuel Guibert, Alys Jones, Ian Williams, Jade Sarson, and the CBLDF's Charles Brownstein." These were centered around the exhibition (on view 2 May – 19 August) "Comics Unmasked: Art and Anarchy in the UK" at the British Library. Curated by John Harris Dunning and Gravett, exhibition events included Bryan and Mary Talbot; Neil Gaiman with Tori Amos; Woodrow Phoenix; Dave McKean, Grant Morrison and Warren Ellis on superheroes; Melinda Gebbie; Alejandro Jodorowsky; Pat Mills, Dave Gibbons and Frazer Irving on 2000 AD; Robert Crumb and Gilbert Shelton plus those involved in the ‘Oz Trial’; Posy Simmonds and Steve Bell; and Bryan Lee O’Malley.

Although no Comica Festival was held in 2015, Comica co-sponsored an event at the Institut Français on April 15, 2015: Julie Birmant and Clément Oubrerie in conversation with Paul Gravett. Similarly, in mid-May 2016, Gravett put on a "Comica London Weekender" at London's House of Illustration. This event included a Comica Comiket.

After Comica went defunct, the Comica Social Club Meet-Up became affiliated with the London Comic Mart.

In March 2023, the Comica brand was revived as a monthlong series of creator discussions at London's Century Club. Participating cartoonists included Posy Simmonds, Dave McKean, Brian Bolland, and Dave Gibbons.

== Graphic Short Story Prize ==
The Comica Graphic Short Story Prize was created in 2007 "with the aim of celebrating the art of the graphic novel and to offer a platform for the graphic novelists of the future to emerge." The prize comes with a £1,000 award. The winner is determined by a panel of judges; along with the winner, a runner-up is also announced. A number of prize winners have gone on to have graphic novels published by Jonathan Cape.

The award came to be known as the Observer/Cape/Comica Graphic Short Story Prize; it is currently called the Observer/Faber Graphic Short Story Prize.

=== List of winners ===
- 2007 Catherine Brighton, "Away In A Manger"
- 2008 Julian Hanshaw, "Sand Dunes and Sonic Booms"
- 2009 Vivien McDermid, "Paint"
- 2010 Stephen Collins, "In Room 208"
- 2011 Isabel Greenberg, "Love in a Very Cold Climate"
- 2012 Corban Wilkin, "But I Can't"
- 2013 Emily Haworth-Booth, "Colonic"
- 2014 Alexis Deacon, "The River"
- 2015 Richard Woods, "The Giants of Football"
- 2016 Matthew Dooley, "Colin Turnbull: A Tall Story"
- 2017 Tor Freeman, "If You’re So Wise, How Come You’re Dead"
- 2018 Edith Pritchett, "An Artistic Odyssey"
- 2019 Edo Brenes, "Memories of Limón"
- 2020 Paul Rainey, "Similar to But Not Here"
- 2021 Astrid Goldsmith, "A Funeral in Freiburg"
- 2022 Rebecca K. Jones, "Midnight Feast"
- 2023 Anna Readman, "Dancing Queen"

== Comica Comiket ==
Comica Comiket was a one-day marketplace convention held during the Comica festival, highlighting British small-press comics and minicomics. (Early in his career, Gravett had run the Fast Fiction booth at the bimonthly Westminster Comics Mart in London. This may have been an inspiration for Comica Comiket, as may have been the long-running Comiket doujinshi convention in Tokyo, Japan.)

The first Comica Comiket: Small Press Fair was held at the Institute of Contemporary Arts on 4 Nov 2007. The 2008 Comica Comiket was co-sponsored by London Underground Comics. The 2009 event was co-sponsored by Alternative Press, We Are Words+Pictures, and Nobrow Press.

The 2010 Comica Comiket was held in conjunction with the National Collectors Marketplace at the Royal National Hotel, Russell Square. The 2010 event saw the introduction of the "Drawing Parade," organized by Peter Stanbury, in which cartoonists made original drawings projected on a large screen. This became a regular feature of Comica Comiket.

In 2013, two Comica Comikets were held, once in the spring and then in the fall during the festival itself. (Although the plan was for future Comikets to be held twice a year, this plan never came to fruition.)

In 2014, a mid-August Comica Comiket was held at the British Library. Exhibitors included Jade Sarson, Gareth Brookes, Hannah Berry, Amber Hsu, Cristian Ortiz, Knockabout Comics, Soaring Penguin, and The Dessinators. The scheduled festival Comica Comiket for November 1, 2014 — to be held at Central Saint Martins — was postponed at a late date and rescheduled for Spring 2015. Instead, a "CanalCon/Comica Comiket" was held September 20, 2015, on the Floating Cinema barge, Granary Square, Central Saint Martin’s College of Art and Design — exhibitors included Rebellion Publishing, SelfMadeHero, Knockabout Comics, First Second Books, Soaring Penguin, Centrala Books, Escape Books; guests included Dave Gibbons. (By this time, the Comica festival itself had gone defunct.)

In 2016, two final Comica Comikets were held: one in the spring and one in the fall. The spring 2016 event — "Comica Comiket: The Independent Comics Market" — was held in London's House of Illustration as part of the "Comica London Weekender"; the Drawing Parade was touted as the "Cavalcade of Celebrity Cartoonists". The fall — and final — Comica Comiket was for the first time held outside of London, in Surrey, at The Lightbox in Woking. Exhibitors included Nick Hayes, Jessica Martin, and Gary Northfield.

=== Comiket dates and locations ===
| Date | Venue | Drawing Parade participants |
|---|---|---|
| Nov 4, 2007 | Institute of Contemporary Arts; London | N/A |
| Nov 22, 2008 | Institute of Contemporary Arts; London | N/A |
| Nov 8, 2009 | ICA Theatre; London | N/A |
| Nov 7, 2010 | Royal National Hotel, Russell Square; London | Charlie Adlard, Darryl Cunningham, Paul Duffield, Hunt Emerson, Garen Ewing, Paul Grist, Roger Langridge, Ellen Lindner, Woodrow Phoenix |
| Nov 12, 2011 | Great Hall, Bishopsgate Institute; London | Brecht Evens, Posy Simmonds, Luke Pearson, Sarah McIntyre, Warren Pleece, and Roger Langridge. |
| Nov 10, 2012 | Great Hall, Bishopsgate Institute; London | Alison Bechdel, Ellen Lindner, Bryan Talbot, Nye Wright, Zarina Liew, Kripa Joshi, Jaromir 99, Steven Appleby, Glyn Dillon, Line Hoven, Kyle Platts, Doctor Simpo, Rian Hughes, Tobias Tak, Hunt Emerson, Emma Vieceli |
| Apr 20, 2013 | Central Saint Martins, University of the Arts London; London | Stephen Collins, Terry Wiley, S. J. Harris Eustace, Vivane Schwarz, Gary Northfield, Oliver East, Hannah Eaton, Dan Berry, Warren & Gary Pleece, Frazer Irving, Chie Kutsuwada, Darryl Cunningham, Mark Stafford, Inko Ketsueki, Neill Cameron |
| Nov 2, 2013 | Central Saint Martins, University of the Arts London; London | Tamayo Akiyama, Gareth Brookes, Katie Green, Isabel Greenberg, ILYA, Metaphrog, David O'Connell, Ginny & Penelope Skinner, Oscar Zarate |
| Aug 16, 2014 | British Library; London | Willem Samuel, Andrew Rae, Asia Alfasi, Al Davison, Mark Buckingham, Francesca Dare, Jan Cleijne, Warren Pleece, Jade Sarson, Emmanuel Guibert, Ian Williams |
| Sep 20, 2015 | Central Saint Martins, University of the Arts London; London | John Allison, Darryl Cunningham, Tom Gauld, Simone Lia, Maarten Vande Wiele, Andi Watson |
| May 14, 2016 | House of Illustration; London | Rachael Ball, Roger Langridge, Owen D. Pomery, Sean Azzopardi, Jessica Martin, Paul B. Rainey, Rozi Hathaway |
| Oct 8, 2016 | The Lightbox; Woking, Surrey | Brigid Deacon, Kripa Joshi, Nick Hayes, Jessica Martin, Shane Melisse, Sarjan Rai, Junior Tomlin, Gareth Brookes, Jamie Huxtable, Gary Northfield, Anthi Chrysanthou, Alexandre Szolnoky |

== Comica festival dates ==
| Dates | Primary Venue | Featured Guest(s) |
|---|---|---|
| June 27–July 6, 2003 | Institute of Contemporary Arts; London | Chris Ware, Charles Burns, Joe Sacco, Warren Ellis, Mike Carey, Posy Simmonds, Frédéric Boilet, Sophie Crumb, David Lloyd, Melinda Gebbie, Peter Hogan, Garry Leach, Gary Spencer Millidge |
| June 5–13, 2004 | Institute of Contemporary Arts, French Institute; London | Chris Ware, Seth, Posy Simmonds, David Beauchard, Craig Thompson, Quentin Blake, Joann Sfar, Frank Margerin, José Villarrubia, Al Davison, ILYA, Glenn Dakin, Carol Swain, Woodrow Phoenix, Chris Reynolds, Sylvia Farago, Simone Lia, Neal Fox, Aleksandar Zograf, Dupuy and Berberian, Joann Sfar, Lewis Trondheim, Andrzel Klimowski, Benoît Peeters |
| Oct. 6–28, 2006 | Institute of Contemporary Arts, UCL Institute of Education; London | Scott McCloud, Marjane Satrapi, Alison Bechdel, Alan Moore, Melinda Gebbie, Guy Delisle, Michel Faber, Sonia Leong, ILYA, Steven Appleby, David Quantick, Stewart Lee, Ben Katchor, Peter Blegvad, Lea DeLaria, Lisa Gornick, Peter Stanbury, Tara McPherson |
| Oct. 19–Nov. 6, 2007 | Institute of Contemporary Arts; London | Sarnath Banerjee, Igort, Gipi, Clément Oubrerie, Jeffrey Lewis, Everett True, Jamie Delano, David Hine, Posy Simmonds, Lisa Appignanesi, Nick Abadzis, Marguerite Abouet, Misako Rocks!, Sean Michael Wilson, Lee O'Connor, Anthony Lappé, Dan Goldman |
| Nov. 14–30, 2008 | Institute of Contemporary Arts | Art Spiegelman, Spain Rodriguez, Gilbert Shelton, Steven L. Holland, Alan Moore, Melinda Gebbie, Pat Mills, Posy Simmonds, Daniel Merlin Goodbrey, Lise Myhre, Asia Alfasi, Emma Rendel, Dave McKean, Ian Rankin, Alex Maleev, Paul Gambaccini, Ian Rakoff, Ted Benoit, Jean Van Hamme, Emmanuel Guibert, Joann Sfar, Kevin Jackson, Doug Braithwaite, Richard Reynolds, Eric Fernie, Hannah Berry, Paul Duffield, Oliver East, Marcia Williams, Richard Appignanesi, Ian Edginton, Ian Culbard, John M. Burns, Mike Collins, David Leach, David Roach, Gary Northfield, Sarah McIntyre, Erich von Götha, Garry Leach, Frederic Mullally, Mike Lake, Greg Theakston, James Romberger |
| Nov. 5–26, 2009 | Institute of Contemporary Arts; London | Apostolos Doxiadis, Marcus de Sautoy, Ben Templesmith, Philip Ridley, Sarah McIntyre, Cameron Stewart, Gerry Finley-Day, Brian Bolland, Dave Gibbons, Phil Clarke, Derek "Bram" Stokes, Eddie Campbell, James Jean, Tara McPherson, Reinhard Kleist, Charles Shaar Murray, Willy Linthout, Michael Rosen |
| Nov. 5–Dec. 1, 2010 | London Print Studio; London | Charlie Adlard, Ho Che Anderson, Bryan Talbot, Darryl Cunningham, Paul Duffield, Hunt Emerson, Garen Ewing, Paul Grist, Roger Langridge, Ellen Lindner, Woodrow Phoenix |
| Nov. 3–25, 2011 | Various venues London | Hannah Berry, Warren Ellis, Lenny Henry, Richard McGuire, Kent Worcester, Daniel Merlin Goodbrey, Frederik Peeters, Robert Sellers, Savage Pencil, Steve Aylett |
| Nov. 2–30, 2012 | Various venues London | Aline Kominsky-Crumb, Robert Crumb, Bryan Talbot, Glyn Dillon, Jaromir 99, Alison Bechdel, Kevin O'Neill, Posy Simmonds, Oliver Frey, Joann Sfar, Karrie Fransman, Simone Lia, Sarah McIntyre, Dave McKean, Rachel Cooke, Othon Mataragas, Doo-Ho Lee, Hyung Min-woo, Jeong-Taek Chae, Jung-hyun Suk, ILYA, David Hine, Anke Feuchtenberger, Line Hoven, Christina Plaka, Andreas Knigge, Andrzej Klimowski, Emma Vieceli |
| Oct. 23–Nov. 16, 2013 | Various venues London | Joe Sacco, Eddie Campbell, Dave McKean, Oscar Zárate, ILYA, Simon Spurrier, Kieron Gillen, Will Brooker, Richard Reynolds, Gareth Brookes, Daniel Merlin Goodbrey, Woodrow Phoenix, Hunt Emerson, Sean Michael Wilson |
| Oct. 20–Nov. 19, 2014 | Various venues London | Jacques Tardi, Junko Mizuno, Carol Swain, Darryl Cunningham, E. M. Carroll, Jason Atomic, Pat Mills, Danny Dorling, Isabel Greenberg, ILYA, Rob Davis, Paul Rainey |

== See also ==
- Angoulême International Comics Festival
- Comiket
- International Comic Arts Forum
- The Lakes International Comic Art Festival
