= United Kingdom Comic Art Convention =

British comic book convention

- Status: Defunct
- Genre: Comic books
- Venue: UCL Institute of Education
- Locations: London (1985–1997); Manchester (1998)
- Country: United Kingdom
- Inaugurated: 1985
- Most recent: 1998
- Attendance: 5,000 (1990)
- Organizer: Rusty Staples (1989–1998)
- Filing status: Originally nonprofit; for-profit beginning in 1989

The United Kingdom Comic Art Convention (UKCAC) was a British comic book convention which was held between 1985 and 1998. As a complement to UKCAC, from 1990 to 1995 the organizers put on the Glasgow-based Glasgow Comic Art Convention (GlasCAC), generally held in the spring.

The largest convention of its kind in the country during the period, the UKCAC and GlasCAC were the sites of annual comics award ceremonies from 1987 to 1998. The UKCAC was the site of the Eagle Awards presentation from 1987 to 1990; the UK Comic Art Awards were presented at one of the conventions — often GlasCAC — from 1991 to 1997; and the National Comics Awards were presented at the UKCAC in 1997–1998.

Most editions of the UKCAC took place in September, over two days, usually on a Saturday and Sunday. The convention featured floorspace for exhibitors, including comic book dealers and collectibles merchants. Along with panels, seminars, and workshops with comic book professionals, one of the annual highlights (until 1989) was the Saturday all-night film show, as well as regular events like quizzes, a fancy dress contest, and a charity auction. The show included an autograph area, as well as a so-called "Artists' Alley" where comics artists signed autographs and sold or did free sketches.

== History ==
UKCAC was a successor to the British Comic Art Convention (commonly known as "Comicon,") which ran, mostly in London, from 1968 to 1981. UKCAC was organised as a nonprofit convention "by the fans for the fans" starting in 1984. The original organizers were Frank Plowright, Hassan Yussuf, and Chris Savva (who actually organized the first convention). Many others contributed either for a few years or on the convention days themselves (most prominent was Richard Barker, between 1986 and 1990). The initial show, in September 1985, attracted more than 500 attendees.

The 1988 convention featured more than 30 comics professionals, and had panels on Harvey Kurtzman (in attendance), comic book printing, politics in comics, violence in comics, and technology. After four conventions, the annual UKCAC charity auction had raised over £15,000.

In 1989 organizers Plowright, Yusuf, and Barker converted the UKCAC to an event generating a salary (mostly as a way to keep the show running and fairly compensate them for the work of organizing it) under the name Rusty Staples. The 1989 UKCAC was co-sponsored by Marvel Comics, Neptune Comic Distributors, and 2000 AD Comics Group. It featured an exhibit on the work of the late Frank Bellamy (an exhibit which had originated in The Basement Gallery in Brixton).

The first Glasgow Comic Art Convention was held in Spring 1990 at Glasgow City Chambers and featured the first presentation of the UK Comic Art Awards, a comics award voted on by British creators, editors, and retailers. The award was created by Rusty Staples and sponsored by Penguin Books UK.

The 1990 London show was co-sponsored by DC Comics among others; attendance was around 5,000 people.

As the years went by, Plowright and Yusuf became the main organizers. London became an increasingly expensive location to host the convention, and they had difficulty keeping costs down and attracting top-level guests. As a result, attendance declined. The UKCAC was held in London until 1997, and in Manchester in its final iteration in 1998.

=== Legacy ===
UKCAC was succeeded by Comic Festival, run in Bristol from 1999 to 2004; and then by Comic Expo, also in Bristol, which ran from 2004 to 2014.

=== Locations and dates ===
Dates	Location	Official guests	Programme booklet contributors	Notes
21–22 Sept. 1985	University of London Union, London	Steve Bissette, Bill Sienkiewicz, Dave Sim, Marv Wolfman, Brian Bolland, John Bolton, Eddie Campbell, Alan Davis, Hunt Emerson, Brett Ewins, Dave Gibbons, Ian Gibson, Denis Gifford, Alan Grant, Garry Leach, David Lloyd, Mike McMahon, Alan Moore, Steve Moore, Paul Neary, Kevin O'Neill, Ron Smith, Dez Skinn, Bryan Talbot, and John Wagner	Cover by Alan Davis and Paul Neary; interior art by Bryan Talbot, Ian Gibson, John Ridgway, Dave Gibbons, Kevin O'Neill, Hunt Emerson, Eddie Campbell, Garry Leach, Alan Davis, Paul Neary, John Wagner, Alan Grant, Robin Smith, Tom Frame, John Bolton, Dicky Howett, Bob Wakelin, John Higgins, Leigh Baulch, Brian Bolland, Phil Elliott, and Glenn Fabry	Admission price for both days: £7.50
20-21 Sept. 1986	University of London Union	Bill Marks, Seth, Dean Motter, David Lloyd, Frank Miller, Lynn Varley, Steve Leialoha, Lew Stringer, Glen Fabry, Gil Kane, John Bolton, Karen Berger, Alan Moore, Neil Gaiman, Jenette Kahn, Dave Gibbons, Kevin O'Neill, Brett Ewins, Carl Potts, Alan Grant, Barry Windsor-Smith, Bryan Talbot, Bill Sienkiewicz, and Chris Claremont	Cover by Alan Davis & Dave Gibbons; interior art by Bryan Talbot, Greg Theakston, Alan Davis, Paul Neary, Ron Smith, Angus McKie, Ian Gibson, Phil Elliott, Kevin O’Neill, Leigh Baulch, Lew Stringer, Mike Collins, Mark Farmer, Dicky Howett, John Bolton, Barry Windsor-Smith, Kev Hopgood, John Higgins, Brian Bolland, Brendan McCarthy, John Ridgway, Hunt Emerson, Graham Higgins, Cam Kennedy, Eddie Campbell, David Pugh, and Mike Matthews	
5–6 Sept. 1987	UCL Institute of Education	Will Eisner, Gil Kane, John Byrne, John Totleben, Steve Bissette, Wendy Pini, Richard Pini, Ron Smith, John Totleben, Steve Bissette, Alan Grant, Dave Gibbons, Bill Sienkiewicz, Dave Sim, Paul Duncan, Martin Crocknell, Carlos Ezquerra, Alan Moore, Neil Gaiman, Grant Morrison	Cover by Jim Baikie; interior work by John Wagner, Alan Grant, Brian Bolland, Bryan Talbot, Kevin O'Neill, Eddie Campbell, Chris Donald, Simon Thorp, and Graham Dury	£10 admission in advance; Presentation of the Eagle Awards
24-25 Sept. 1988	Logan Hall, UCL Institute of Education, London	Cam Kennedy, Los Bros Hernandez, David Lloyd, Lovern Kinzierski, Richard Bruning, Garry Leach, Trina Robbins, Debbie Delano, Harvey Kurtzman, Gary Groth, Carl Potts, Melinda Gebbie, Jenette Kahn, John Byrne, Jerry Ordway, Dave Gibbons, Matt Wagner, Dave McKean, Ann Nocenti	Cover by Jerry Ordway; interior art by Phil Elliott, Lew Stringer, Graham Higgins, Glenn Fabry, Kev Hopgood, John Ridgway, John Higgins, Mike Collins, Ian Gibson, Dicky Howett, John Bolton, Hunt Emerson, Bryan Talbot, Alan Davis, Mark Farmer, Garry Leach, Cam Kennedy, Kevin O'Neill, Brian Bolland, and Dave Gibbons	Admission price for both days: £10; 2,500 attendees; presentation of the Eagle Awards
8–10 Sept. 1989	University of London	Jim Baikie, Grant Morrison, Jamie Delano, Kev F. Sutherland, John Ridgway, Dickie Howitt, Cam Kennedy, Guy Lawley, Will Simpson, Tim Perkins, Warren Pleece, Gary Pleece, Trina Robbins, Steve Yeowell, Steve Leialoha, Mark Farmer, Karen Berger, John Byrne, Jenette Kahn, Jaime Hernandez, Howard Chaykin, Woodrow Phoenix, Lew Stringer, Richard Bruning, David Lloyd, Susan Catherine, Barry Kitson, Mike Grell, Mark Buckingham, Tom Veitch, Gerhard, Gilbert Hernandez, Garry Leach, Steve Yeowell, Dave Gibbons, Phil Elliott, Myra Hancock, Paul Gravett, Eddie Campbell, Georgiou Bambos, Ed Pinsent, Glenn Dakin, Don Lawrence, Liam Sharp, Bill Marks, Archie Goodwin, Al Davison, Kevin O'Neill, Howard Chaykin, Dennis O'Neil, and Bryan Talbot	Program cover featuring Batman; interior pages by Doug Braithwaite, Jamie Hewlett, Bryan Talbot, Simon Bisley, Mark Farmer, Kevin O'Neill, Philip Bond, David Lloyd, Mark Buckingham, Steve Whitaker, and David Hine	
22–24 Sept. 1990	UCL Institute of Education, London	Norm Breyfogle, John Higgins, Charles Vess	Cover by Garry Leach featuring Captain America; interior art by Mark Buckingham, Caspar Williams, Nick Abadzis, Mike McMahon, John Higgins, Mark Farmer, Norm Breyfogle, Mike Collins, David Pugh, Lee Sullivan, Colin MacNeil, Kevin O'Neill, Brian Bolland, Nigel Kitching, Paul Johnson, Charles Vess, Alan Davis, Dave Gibbons	Presentation of the Eagle Awards by Paul Gambaccini and Dave Gibbons
[Early] Sept. 1991	London	Murphy Anderson and Dan Jurgens	Cover by Simon Bisley; interior work by Paul Johnson, David Pugh, Philip Bond, Martin Hand, Mark Buckingham, Paul Grist, Craig Dixon, Mike Gibas, Arthur Ranson, Woodrow Phoenix, Mike Collins, Sean Phillips, Hunt Emerson, Lew Stringer, Phil Elliott, Leigh Baulch, Barry Kitson, Duncan Fegredo, Angus McKie, Murphy Anderson, Peter Doherty, Kevin O'Neill, Bob Lynch, Davey Jones, Darryl Cunningham, John Higgins, Simon Harrison, John McCrea, Rian Hughes, Kev F. Sutherland, Gary Erskine, Martin Griffith, Art Wetherell, Davy Francis, Ed McHenry, Shane Oakley, Alan Davis, Martin Nodell, and Lee Sullivan	
19–20 Sept. 1992	UCL Institute of Education, London	John Romita, Jr., Chris Claremont, David Mazzucchelli, Steve Bissette, Mike Mignola, Tom Veitch, Evan Dorkin, Paul Kupperberg, Dave Gibbons, Alan Grant, Peter Milligan, Mike Collins, John McCrea, Lew Stringer, John Beeston, Stephen Sampson, Jamie Hewlett, Doug Braithwaite, Arthur Ranson, Andrew Wildman, Paul Johnson, Richmond Lewis, Sean Phillips, Charlie Adlard, Mark Buckingham, and Kev Walker		
18–19 Sept. 1993	London	Grant Morrison, Garth Ennis, Rian Hughes, Steve Yeowell, Jill Thompson, Matt Wagner, Alan Grant, and Carlos Ezquerra		Featured a "2000 AD Creators Love-in"
Sept. 1994	London	Guest of honour John Buscema.	Cover by Glenn Fabry.	
30 Sept. – 1 Oct. 1995	UCL Institute of Education / Royal National Hotel, London	Stan Lee, John Buscema, Richard Elson, Nigel Kitching, Lew Stringer, Steve White		
Sept. 1996	London	Scott Lobdell, Jim Woodring, Richard Elson, Nigel Kitching, Lew Stringer, Steve White	Cover by Bryan Talbot featuring Doctor Strange; interior art by James Hodgkins, Craig Dixon, James Murphy, Lee Townsend, Richard Elson, Jon Haward, John Erasmus, Peter Doherty, Al Davison, Scott Lobdell, Jim Woodring, Mike Perkins, Robert Corona, Alan Davis/Mark Farmer, Nigel Kitching, and John McCrea	
15-16 Mar. 1997	UCL Institute of Education, London	Joe Kubert, Dan Clowes		Presentation of the inaugural National Comics Awards by Paul Gambaccini and Jonathan Ross on March 15; presentation of the UK Comic Art Awards on March 16
21–22 Mar. 1998	Manchester	Joe Sacco, Alex Ross, Eddie Campbell, Colleen Doran, Woodrow Phoenix, William Messner-Loebs, Alan Grant, and Dave Taylor	Cover by Alex Ross; interior work by Ed Hillyer, Martin Hand, Woodrow Phoenix, Roger Langridge, Paul Johnson, Henry Flint, Adrian Salmon, Ashley Sanders, David Pugh, Craig Dixon, Dave Windett, Ian Peterson, Rik Rawling, Dom Morris, Lee Townsend, Phil Elliott, Will Kane, Staz Johnson, Lew Stringer, Jake Carney, Dave Taylor, Jon Haward, Colin MacNeil, Phil Gascoine, John Higgins, Colleen Doran, Charlie Adlard, Paul Marshall, Jim Hodgkins, James Murphy, Mark Buckingham, Dave King, Art Wetherell, Mike Perkins, Duncan Fegredo, Sean Phillips, Paul Staples, Glenn Dakin, Stephen Baskerville, and Bryan Talbot	Presentation of the National Comics Awards; final edition of UKCAC

=== Glasgow Comic Art Convention locations and dates ===
Dates	Location	Official guests	Programme booklet contributors	Notes
April 1990	Glasgow City Chambers, Glasgow, Scotland			First annual GlasCAC; presentation of the Speakeasy Awards
Spring 1991	Glasgow	Steve Gerber, Alan Davis	Cover by Colin MacNeil featuring Judge Dredd; interior art by Matt Broker, David Pugh, Mike Collins, Charles Vess, Bryan Hitch, Gerry Dolan, Caspar Williams, Alan Davis, Davy Francis, Alan Moore	Presentation of the UK Comic Art Awards
14–15 Mar. 1992	Glasgow City Halls, Candleriggs, Glasgow	Peter David and Peter Bagge, as well as participants in the "Deadline Mini-Tour": Nick Abadzis, Rachel Ball, Philip Bond, Glyn Dillon, D'Israeli, Evan Dorkin, Jamie Hewlett, Alan Martin, Shaky 2000, and Si Spencer	Cover by Jamie Hewlett featuring Fireball; interior art by Evan Dorkin, Colin MacNeil, Peter Bagge, Darick Robertson, Dan Brereton, Angus McKie, Hunt Emerson, David Pugh, Jon Beeston, Paul Johnson, Cam Kennedy, Davy Francis, Paul Grist, Woodrow Phoenix, Philip Bond, John McCrea, Gary Erskine, Tony O'Donnell, Sean Phillips, Dave Alexander, Gerry Dolan, Kev F. Sutherland, Charlie Adlard, Rian Hughes, Padam Singh, Guy Lawley, Paul Peart, Craig Dixon, Bryan Talbot	
24–25 Mar. 1993	Glasgow City Halls, Glasgow	Jim Shooter, David Pugh, John Ostrander, Colin MacNeil, Cam Kennedy, Dave Alexander, John Beeston	Cover by Steve Pugh featuring Animal Man; interior art by Tim Perkins, Davy Francis, Mark Buckingham, Bryan Talbot, Philip Bond, John McCrea, Sean Phillips, Phil Elliott, Bob Lynch, Duncan Fegredo, Hunt Emerson, David Pugh, Jim Baikie, Kev F. Sutherland, Charlie Adlard, D'Israeli, Rian Hughes, Stu Jennett, David Lloyd, Frank Quitely, Brett Ewins, Doug Braithwaite, Kevin O'Neill, Tony O'Donnell, Cam Kennedy, John Ostrander, Woodrow Phoenix, Angus McKie, Carl Critchlow, Colin MacNeil, Dave Alexander, Simon Jacob, Paul Johnson	Admission price for both days: £15; presentation of the UK Comic Art Awards
19–20 Mar. 1994	Glasgow City Halls, Glasgow			Presentation of the fifth annual UK Comic Art Awards
Spring 1995	Glasgow			Final edition of the GlasCAC
