= British small press comics =

Self-published comic books in the United Kingdom

British small press comics, once known as stripzines, are comic books self-published by amateur cartoonists and comic book creators, usually in short print runs, in the UK. They're comparable to similar movements internationally, such as American minicomics and Japanese doujinshi. A "small press comic" is essentially a zine composed predominantly of comic strips. The term emerged in the early 1980s to distinguish them from zines about comics. Notable artists who have had their start in British small press comics include Eddie Campbell, Paul Grist, Rian Hughes, Jamie Hewlett, Alan Martin, Philip Bond and Andi Watson.

Small press comics are traditionally sold by mail, using reviews and classified adverts, websites, email lists and word of mouth to reach an audience. There are usually one or more mail order services, commonly known as "distros", operating in the UK. These will hold a wide range of titles and take a cut of the cover price. They are also sold at conventions and festivals, with small groups of like-minded creators often sharing a table at a reduced rate. Specialist small press events included CAPTION in Oxford (produced from 1992 to 2017), and the UK Web & Mini Comix Thing in London (produced from 2004 to 2010). Creators will often make international links to these forms of distribution in other countries and vice versa.

The traditional format has been a photocopied and stapled booklet, usually at A5 size. This is similar to American minicomics, although other sizes are known. Some creators continue to produce publications in this style, emphasizing the hand-made aspect and often decorating each copy by hand. In recent years the increasing availability of digital printing has made professional printing affordable for short-run publications. Some of the spirit of small press comics can now also be found in webcomics.

== History ==
=== Background ===
Traditionally, a small press publisher was simply a publisher who operated on a small scale, often with a manual printing press in-house. They produced limited print-runs of publications that larger, more commercially inclined publishers would reject.

The history of British small press comics is tied up with the underground press of the 1960s, with publications such as Oz and International Times. The British underground comix scene was led by Nasty Tales and Knockabout Comics of the 1970s, as well as the popularization of Punk zines in the late 1970s. The latter had a larger audience from cheap and accessible photocopying. This dramatic lowering of technological barriers to entry meant anyone could produce a publication with a print run, regardless of its commercial potential.

Within the British comics fandom of the 1970s and early 1980s there were many zines about comics, mainly concentrating on American superhero titles. Since high-street retailers of comics were scarce, these zines ran mail order services and relied on the postal service for distribution. The first and most famous of these was Fantasy Advertiser. There were also regular markets or "marts" which served as a social meeting place for artists and fans. This was the backbone of small press comics.

=== The 1970s ===
Among the earliest British small press comics was The Tale of Beem Gotelump. It told the story of an aging jazz musician who was tasked by the Archangel Gabriel with playing the last trumpet at the end of the world. It was created and published by Eddie Campbell under the pseudonym "Roland Bunn" in 1975.

Kevin O'Neill and co-writer Jack Adrian published Mek Memoirs in 1976. It was a 12-page "stripzine" about a robot war, which can be seen as a precursor to O'Neill's later work on 2000 AD.

Near Myths was an underground comics anthology published in Edinburgh from 1978 to 1980. It ran for five issues and featured the first professionally published work of Grant Morrison, Graham Manley, and Tony O'Donnell. It also featured the start of Bryan Talbot's seminal graphic novel The Adventures of Luther Arkwright. Teenager Grant Morrison's contribution, Gideon Stargrave, later found his way into Morrison's Vertigo series The Invisibles.

Perhaps the most successful of all British small press comics is the adult humour comic Viz, first published in Newcastle in 1979. It grew out of the punk fanzine scene, and went on to successful newsstand publication, continuing to the present day.

=== The 1980s ===
The first flowering of British small press comics centered on Fast Fiction, which began as a stall run by Paul Gravett at the bi-monthly Westminster Comic Mart in London in 1981. It later developed into an anthology, a mail order service, and a news sheet, lasting in various forms until 1990. Artists associated with this scene included Eddie Campbell, Phil Elliott, Glenn Dakin, Paul Grist, Ed Hillyer, Woodrow Phoenix, Rian Hughes, Bob Lynch, Ed Pinsent, and the teenage Warren Ellis. Campbell claims he persuaded his fellow artists to call their publications "small press comics" rather than "fanzines", after seeing the term "small press" used for similar publications at a poetry festival. Gravett and Peter Stanbury published many of the Fast Fiction artists in Escape Magazine from 1983 to 1989.

Between 1983 and 1995 Zine Zone (later Zine Zone International), a Bristol-based company specialising in mail order, comic mart service and publications, focused international attention on UK small pressers and helped a number go on to mainstream comics, including D'Israeli and Duncan Fegredo.

In 1987 Jamie Hewlett, Philip Bond and Alan Martin (then students at from Northbrook College, Worthing) produced two issues of a small press comic called Atomtan. This caught the attention of Brett Ewins, who invited them to contribute to his new comics magazine, Deadline, which began in 1988. Hewlett and Martin created the magazine's flagship character, Tank Girl, and Hewlett went on to work in animation, most notably creating the cartoon rock group Gorillaz.

=== The 1990s ===
After Ed Pinsent finished with the last incarnation of Fast Fiction, cartoonist Luke Walsh (later known as Luke Temple Walsh) and reader Mike Kidson took over their mailing list with Zum! their new review zine. The first issue appeared in August 1991. Zum! distributed copies of comics submitted to a panel of reviewers, often cartoonists themselves, who were encouraged to write critical reviews of significant length. It also featured reproductions of the comics under review. Zum! continues as a website run by Paul Schroeder. Caption, a zine-cum-APA devoted to small press comics edited by Jenni Scott, ran from 1992 to 1998, and spawned the long-running Caption small press comics convention, held annually in Oxford from 1992 to 2017.

The 1990s saw the reemergence of fanzines about comics in the Fantasy Advertiser mold. Battleground, edited by Andy Brewer, was at first mainly concerned with American superhero comics, although it also featured reviews and articles on small press comics, and interviews with the cartoonists. Vicious, edited by Pete Ashton, was more free-form, and promised to print all material submitted. Ashton also created TRS (The Review Sheet), collecting capsule reviews and contact details for small press comics, in 1995. In 1996 he set up the BugPowder distribution service, which sold any British small press comics that cared to be listed as well as importing selected books from the US and Europe. TRS was discontinued in 1998, before being revived as TRS2 by Andrew Luke. BugPowder closed as a distributor in 2000, but the BugPowder blog continued to spotlight British small press activity, including the now-online TRS2.

Slab-O-Concrete was a mail-order distributor and publisher set up by Australian pavement artist Peter Pavement and also Dave Hanna in the early 1990s. Its first title was Pavement's own Pavement Pizza, and it soon began selling British small press comics (including such titles as Time Warp: The End of the Century Club, by Ed Hillyer; Sugar Buzz by Woodrow Phoenix, and Witch by Lorna Miller) and zines on marts in Brighton and Hove, and importing books from the US, Australia, and Europe. Slab-O-Concrete developed into a full-scale publisher, repackaging small press comics for the bookshop market and originating new work. It avoided the direct market of comic shops and made connections with underground publishers, zinesters, indie record labels, and other subcultural scenes. Slab-O-Concrete ended due to cash flow issues in 2001.

Other groups included Dachshund, run by Andy, aka Andy Konky Kru, which published Graphic Reviews, a review zine featuring reviews in comic strip form by Lee Kennedy and others, and an A8-sized anthology, Itsy Bitsy. Andrew Moreton set up Massive, a small press distributor, in 1992, and also published a zine, The Comics Cut Quarterly. Psychopia, was a zine and distributor set up by cartoonist B. Patson in 1994, which still exists online. Other cartoonists sold their work through classified ads in Comics International magazine.

Notable self-published comics of the 90s included Paul Grist's Kane, Gary Spencer Millidge's Strangehaven, Sleaze Castle by Dave McKinnon and Terry Wiley, and Strange Weather Lately by Metaphrog, all of which received widespread distribution through Diamond Comic Distributors.

=== The 2000s ===
From 2000 until 2011 Metaphrog went on to produce the full-colour Louis series of graphic novels which received mainstream media attention and book shop distribution.

Recent creators to have launched through the small press include Gary Northfield, whose Derek the Sheep has gained a recurring slot in the Beano. Writer Jason Cobley, who has been self-publishing his Bulldog comics since the mid-90s, and former Bulldog Empire artist Neill Cameron, now work for The DFC and Classical Comics. Garen Ewing, who worked in small press comics in the 1990s, moved onto the web with The Rainbow Orchid, soon to be published in print by Egmont UK, and also contributes to The DFC. The Etherington Brothers (Robin and Lorenzo), creators of the small press comic Malcolm Magic, have gone on to create "Monkey Nuts" for The DFC, "Yore" for the Dandy and "Baggage" for Random House. PJ Holden, Al Ewing, Arthur Wyatt and David Baillie (comics) emerged from the small press to work for 2000 AD.

One of the current leading distros is SmallZone, founded in 1999 by Shane Chebsey, which also provides a printing service for small press creators. Chebsey and Andrew Richmond also publish comics under the Scar Comics banner. In 2006 the first Scar Comics graphic novel, Falling Sky by Ben Dickson, won "Best Indie Surprise" on Ain't It Cool News.

Another activist for British independent comics is writer/artist Barry Renshaw. Founding the Engine Comics imprint in 2000, Renshaw wrote and published the Rough Guide to Self Publishing, which is now in its fourth edition (2007) and was described as 'essential purchase for budding self-publishers' by industry paper Comics International. In 2004, Engine Comics launched Redeye Magazine, a news/reviews magazine specifically created to educate and promote small press and self-published comics to the wider public. It has been described as a 'vital read' by SFX magazine and "a must-have" by Ain't It Cool News. Other titles include Seven Sentinels and the Fusion anthology.

Accent UK, a collective headed by Dave West (Deva Comics) and Colin Mathieson (M56 Comics), was formed in 2002 and produced themed US-format anthologies featuring contributions from dozens of UK independent creators. In addition to the founding members, regular contributors to Accent UK publications include Andy Bloor, Jon H. Ayre, David Hitchcock, John Reppion and Leah Moore (daughter of Alan Moore), Bridgeen Gillespie (Mr Maximo & Rabbit), Garry Brown, and David Baillie. The 2007 anthology Zombies, included a cover by American artist Steve Bissette.

The Judge Dredd Megazine featured a regular small press spotlight section between the years of 2007 and 2009, featuring columns by Matt Badham and David Baillie and a selection of strips by creators from the small press scene.

FutureQuake Publishing was originally set up to publish the anthology comic FutureQuake. By a combination of launching new titles and taking over existing ones whose owners retire from the scene, they have built up a stable including MangaQuake, Something Wicked and Lost Property, as well as 2000AD fanzines Zarjaz and Dogbreath. Solar Wind has won numerous awards for its long-running series of parodic comics, which pastiche the style of children's comics of the 1970s. The group publishes Solar Wind, Sunny for Girls, Big War Comic, Omnivistascope and is connected to The End Is Nigh (through Solar Wind editor/writer Paul Scott and other creators).

London Underground Comics is both a weekly market stall in Camden Lock Market and a loose collective of U.K. based small press creators whose work is sold and displayed on the weekly stall. London Underground Comics was founded in November 2007 by Camden-based creator Oli Smith who co-ran the stall with the help of a variety of small press creators until 2009. LUC also ran larger one-day events that took up an additional 1,000 square feet (93 m^{2}) of Camden Lock Market such as No Barcodes in April 2008 and Low Energy Day in August 2008. LUC promoted their stall and events via YouTube videos.

The UK Web & Mini Comix Thing was a yearly event in London run by Patrick Findlay that brings the British small press and webcomics communities together to sell and promote their work.

Radio 4 broadcast a series on small press publishing, aired late 2009. One of the episodes focussed on small press comics, reviewing titles from both The UK and from the USA/Canada. One of the titles featured was the cult London small press comic "Eat, Drink & Be Buried."

Recent years have seen the rise of the small press both online and in print, with conventions held around the UK and review platforms like Broken Frontier and Slings and Arrows supporting creators’ work.

== See also ==
- Fanzine
