= Dave Thorpe =

British writer (born 1954)

- Born: 1954 (age 71–72); United Kingdom
- Occupations: Comic book writer, novelist
- Writing career
- Period: 1981 -
- Genres: Science fiction, superhero
- Notable works: Captain Britain; Hybrids
- Website: davidthorpe.info

Dave Thorpe (born 1954, died April 2024) was a British writer who is best known for his work on Captain Britain.

== Biography ==
David Thorpe's career began when he joined Marvel UK in 1980 as an assistant editor and art assistant. He soon started writing Captain Britain, helping to revamp the character with Paul Neary and Alan Davis in Marvel Superheroes issue #377. He created many of the characters later used by Alan Moore and wrote the character till issue #386 (Moore took over the writing duties from issue #387). Thorpe and Davis (both doing some of their earliest professional comics work) created Mad Jim Jaspers and wrote the story that would lead into the Jaspers' Warp storyline. The political commentaries in Thorpe's stories ignited conflicts with his editors, leading to his being taken off the series; Davis later commented, "Dave's departure was the result of months of petty politics and very unpleasant." Thorpe's material was reprinted in 1995, in the X-Men archives: Captain Britain limited series, and later trade paperbacks.

Davis credits Thorpe with coming up with the term Earth-616, the designation for the main universe in the Marvel Multiverse. He says it was based on 616, a variation on the Number of the Beast, because "Dave Thorpe, who wasn't a fan of the modern superhero genre, was responsible for most of the more madcap or satirical elements — such as recording his opinion of the Marvel Universe with the designation 616." Thorpe himself argues that he was always a confirmed fan of superheroes.

Thorpe's next work of note was Doc Chaos (1985–1990). Doc Chaos was a commissioned TV series, two comics series, and a novella. Limehouse Productions commissioned scripts, which were co-written by Thorpe with Lawrence Gray. A comics version achieved a cult following. The first series was serialised by Rob Sharp's AntiMatter Comics, then collected into books by Paul Gravett's Escape. In North America it was published by Vortex Comics, with cover designs by Rian Hughes. The scripts were adapted into comics by artists Phil Elliott, Duncan Fegredo, and Steve Sampson.

A novella, Doc Chaos: The Chernobyl Effect, was published in 1988 by Hooligan Press, with illustrations by comics artists Simon Bisley, Brian Bolland, Brett Ewins, Duncan Fegredo, Rian Hughes, Lin Jammett, Pete Mastin, Dave McKean, Savage Pencil, Ed Pinsent and Bryan Talbot. An e-book version, with an added story: Doc Chaos: The Last Laugh, was published in 2012 by Cambria Books.

He was a co-founder of the London Screenwriters Workshop in 1983, pursuing a freelance script writing career, and a co-founder of the successor to The Leveller magazine, Monochrome Newspaper, a free, left-wing/anarchist street newspaper which he co-edited and for which he wrote from 1983–1988. During the 1980s he also worked as a comics writer or editor with Marvel Comics, Titan Books, Vortex Comics, Eclipse Comics (writing The Rise and Fall of the Soviet Union trading cards), Escape (magazine), Spiderbaby Grafix and Alan Moore's Mad Love comics, also with MacdonaldFutura, HarperCollins, Oxfam (How the World Works) and Greenpeace. Various cartoon strips in journals have also been published. Thorpe conceived, commissioned, and edited a series of titles on behalf of Macdonald-Futura matching best-selling literary authors with notable comics artists, a project forced to be abandoned upon the suicide of that publisher's owner, Kevin Maxwell. One title in the series was taken up by another publisher: Doris Lessing's Playing the Game, published by HarperCollins.

In the 1990s, until 1999, Thorpe founded and managed the Publications arm of the Centre for Alternative Technology, which commissioned and published approximately 90 titles under his supervision. The most well-known of these is The Whole House Book, written by Cindy Harris and Pat Borer.

Thorpe was the winner of the 2006 HarperCollins/Saga Magazine contest to find the "new J.K. Rowling" with his novel Hybrids, published by HarperCollins in May 2007. In it, a virus causes teenagers to merge with technology in a terror-filled near-future world. "Hybrids" is “a stunningly clever novel” - The Times.

Thorpe is now a consultant, speaker and author in the fields of carbon-free energy and sustainable development.

David Thorpe is a founding member of the One Planet Council (2014), Special Consultant on Sustainable Cities Collective, and was from 2000–2013 the (part-time) News Editor of Energy and Environmental Management magazine, on which website he also had a weekly op-ed column. He is the author of several books and hundreds of articles on related subjects.

David Thorpe died in April 2024.

== Bibliography ==
=== Non-fiction ===
- The One Planet Life
- Energy Management in Buildings
- Energy Management in Industry
- Solar Technology
- Sustainable Transport Fuels
- Solar Photovoltaics
- Sustainable Home Refurbishment
- How The World Works
- The Rise and Fall of the Soviet Union

=== Comics ===
- Captain Britain (with Alan Davis, in Marvel Superheroes #377-386, 1981)
- "I Was a Teenage Target" (with Lin Jammet, in AARGH!, 1988)
- "After Life" (with Aidan Potts, in Taboo #7, 9, 1992, 1995)

=== Novels ===
- Hybrids (HarperCollins in May 2007)
