= Caption (comics convention) =

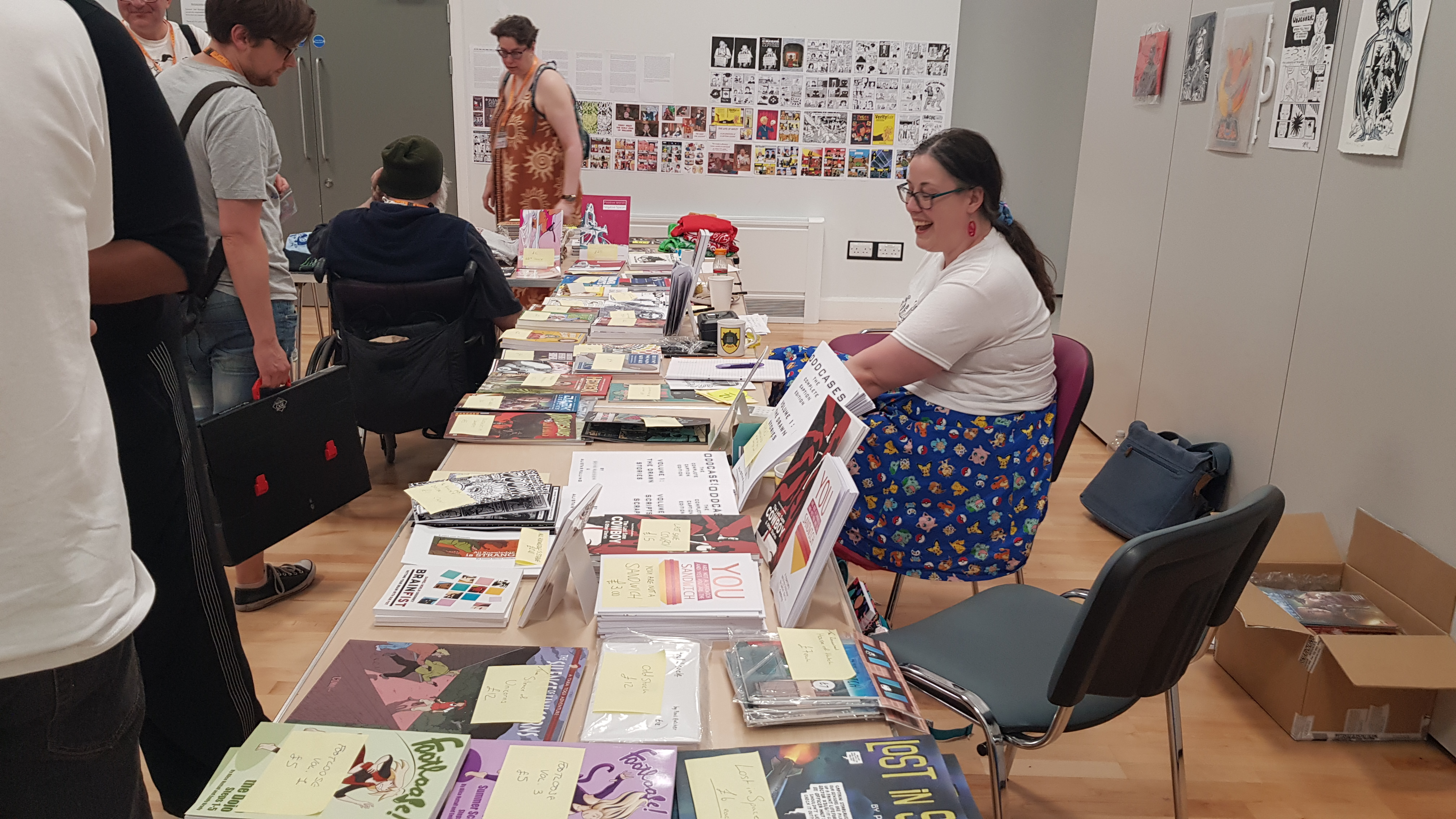
- Caption 2025 "Rebirth" - showing the community comics stall
- Status: Active
- Genre: Comics
- Venue: Oxford Union Society (1992–2003); Wolfson College (2004–2005); East Oxford Community Centre (2006–2013); Coventry (2015); The Phoenix, Brighton (2017); Seacourt Hall, Oxford (2025)
- Locations: Oxford (1992–2013); Coventry (2015); Brighton (2017)
- Country: United Kingdom
- Inaugurated: 1992
- Most recent: 2025
- Organizer: Adrian Cox, Damian Cugley, Jeremy Dennis, and Jenni Scott
- Website: caption.org

CAPTION is an annual comics convention specialising in British small press comics. It was first held in Oxford in January 1992, subsequently being held in summer each year. Loosely based on a theme, each year's event offers panels and workshops related to small press comics along with the opportunity to buy and sell them. CAPTION was last held in 2025, and is expected to return in 2026.

CAPTION differs from other conventions by breaking down the distinction between named guests and other attendees, avoiding segregation or special treatment of guests. In addition, it prioritizes the social interaction of attendees by encouraging comics creators to place their publications on the CAPTION stall, managed by a rota of volunteers.

== History ==
CAPTION was founded in 1992 by Adrian Cox, Damian Cugley, Jeremy Dennis, and Jenni Scott. Between 1992 and 2003 CAPTION took place in the Oxford Union Society.

Ed Pinsent was an early star of CAPTION conventions, selling his Fast Fiction on his stall.

In 1993 Andy Roberts moved to Oxford, and was able to lend his considerable experience in art and design to the convention.

In 1994 Peter Pavement started selling zines from around the world as well as repackaging other small press comics, and his zine Pavement Pizza became Ground Level.

CAPTION moved venues to Wolfson College for 2004 and 2005. From 2006 to 2013 it was held at the East Oxford Community Centre.

CAPTION skipped a year in 2014. It had been planned to be held in Brighton, but a scheduling conflict with the University of Brighton forced the show to be canceled. At that point, the show announced its intention to mount future shows in a different British city each year.

CAPTION also skipped a year in 2016 before returning in December 2017 for the convention's 25th-anniversary show.

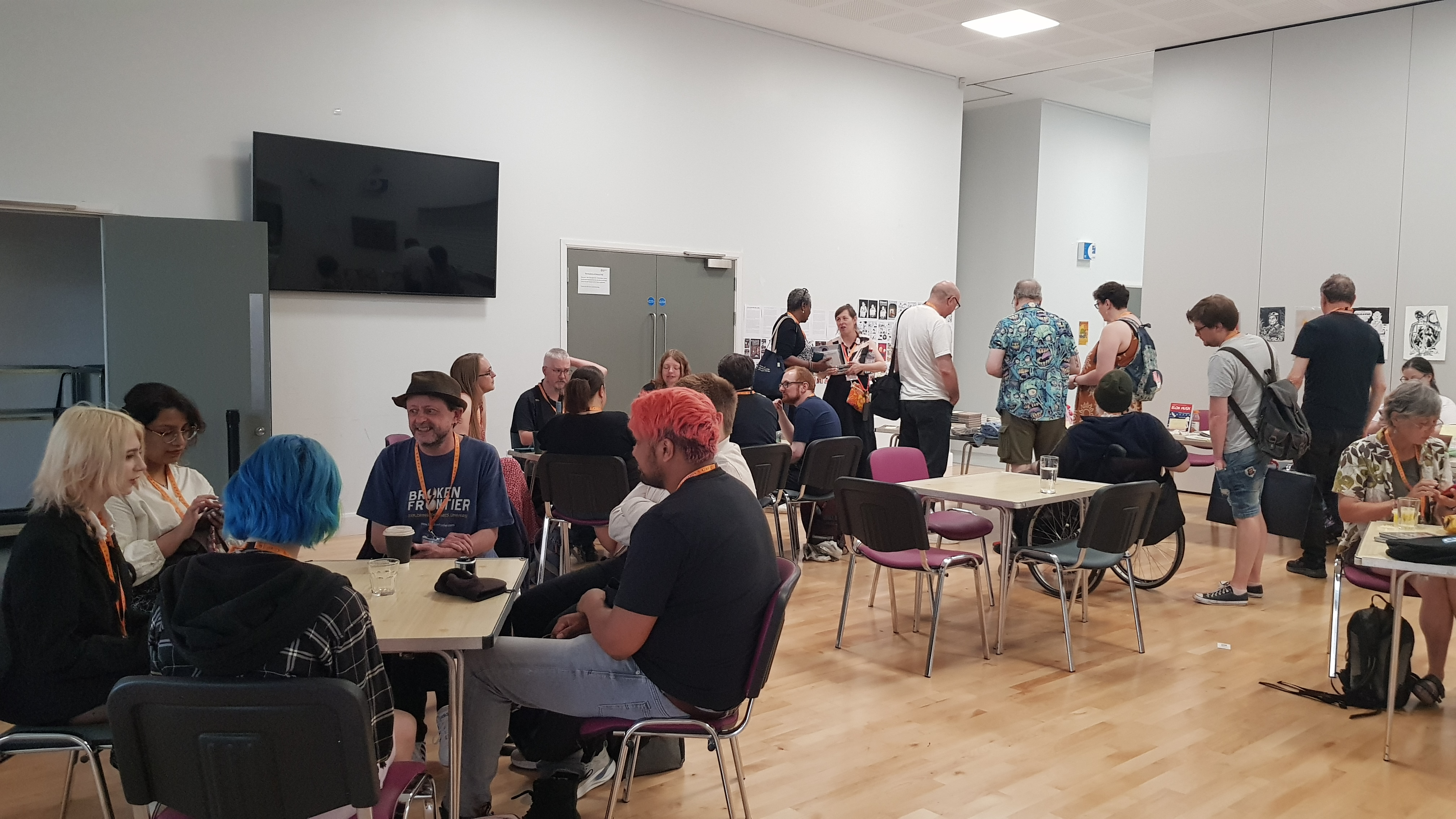
Caption 2025 (theme: Rebirth) communal area at Seacourt Hall

The event returned to Oxford in 2025 with speakers including Darryl Cunningham, Andy Oliver, Bobby Joseph and others.

=== Dates, themes, and special guests ===
- January 1992: no specific theme
- 17–18 July 1993: Comics: Art or Trash? — debating the status of comics within culture
- Summer 1994: Sex & Drugs & Rock'n'Roll — guests include Hunt Emerson, Pete Loveday, and Bryan Talbot
- Summer 1995:
- Summer 1996: Lazy CAPTION
- 19–20 July 1997: EuroCAPTION — guests include France's David B, Spain's Max, and the Netherlands' Maaike Hartjes
- 25–26 July 1998: The Death of CAPTION
- Summer 1999: SpaceCAPTION1999 — guests include Bryan Talbot
- 12–13 August 2000: You cannot kill that which is already dead
- 18–19 August 2001: Love is ... CAPTION 2001
- 17–18 August 2002: CAPTION Noir
- August 2003: CyberCAPTION — guests include Carla Speed McNeil
- 14–15 August 2004: CAPTION is History — guests include Al Davison and Pat Mills
- 30–31 July 2005: Bargain Basement CAPTION
- 5–6 August 2006: CAPTION Remix
- 11–12 August 2007: Dreams and Nightmares
- 9–10 August 2008: Timewarp CAPTION
- 15–16 August 2009: CAPTION is away with the fairies
- 31 July to 1 August 2010: Mad Science
- 6–7 August 2011: Austerity
- 18–19 August 2012: CAPTION Summer Special
- 24–25 August 2013
- 10–11 October 2015
- 1–2 December 2017: 25th anniversary show
- 16–17 August 2025: Caption REBIRTH
- 8–9 August 2026: PIRATE Caption
