= Escape (magazine) =

British comic strip magazine

- The cover to Escape magazine #3. Art by Chris Long

Publication information
- Publisher: Escape Publishing (issues 1–9); Titan Books (issues 10–19)
- Format: Ongoing series
- Publication date: 1983 – 1989
- No. of issues: 19

Creative team
- Created by: Paul Gravett and Peter Stanbury
- Artist(s): Eddie Campbell; Glenn Dakin; Phil Elliott
- Editor(s): Paul Gravett; Peter Stanbury

Escape magazine was a British comic strip magazine founded and edited by Paul Gravett and Peter Stanbury. Nineteen issues were published between 1983 and 1989. Eddie Campbell, Phil Elliott and Glenn Dakin were amongst the many cartoonists published within its pages. Escape Publishing also released a limited number of graphic novels in the period 1984–1989, some co-published with Titan Books.

== Origins ==
Escape has its origins in the explosion of small press or minicomics that occurred in the UK in the early 1980s. Paul Gravett was running a stall at the Westminster Comic Mart in London called Fast Fiction where he would sell other people's self-published comics for a small cut. These would generally be short-run publications, usually photocopied and assembled by hand, by creators who couldn't find a professional outlet for their work with many coming from an art school background with unique approaches to comic art.

At the same time awareness was growing of international developments in the medium. Art Spiegelman and Françoise Mouly's RAW magazine had started pushing the boundaries in the USA while European anthologies such as Métal Hurlant, Charlie Mensuel and PLG showed not only radically different styles of comic art to the usual UK/US variety but a more mature and analytical approach to the medium.

Gravett with his partner Peter Stanbury, employed at the time at Harpers & Queen, decided to publish a magazine featuring comics both from the UK and from around the world.

=== The importance of BD ===
Short for bande dessinée, BD became the ideological anchor for Escape. Gravett wanted to apply the values of and respect attributed to French comics to his new breed of British artists. Visually this was reflected in the work of Phil Elliott and Rian Hughes, but it also infused the whole attitude of the magazine, that some comics at least deserved to be taken seriously. By identifying with the relatively exotic and beautifully produced volumes from Europe, Escape distanced itself from the action-adventure style of 2000AD and the American superheroes of Marvel and DC and established itself not only as something new but also important.

=== Pssst! ===
In 1981, having passed the Fast Fiction stall and distribution to Phil Elliott and before starting Escape, Gravett was employed as promotions manager for Pssst!, an attempt to publish a British equivalent of the lavish French bande dessinée magazines. While disillusioned with the direction, or lack of, Pssst! was taking, his job brought him into contact with many more new and innovative cartoonists around the UK. To some of these, such as Glenn Dakin in Manchester, he introduced the concept of self-publishing small press comics and sending them out to like-minded souls, thus widening the net for Fast Fiction. Pssst! was forced to close after 10 issues, leaving Gravett with a good idea of how not to run a magazine and a pool of talent.

== The A5 years ==
The first seven issues of Escape were published between 1983 and 1985 as A5, or digest-sized, booklets of between 56 and 84 pages in length with black and white interiors and colour covers. The covers were wrap-around and, for the first five issues, hand-separated by Stanbury until full-process colour became viable. The smaller size was chosen to physically differentiate it from other comics around at the time with a nod to the photocopied small press comics that usually came in this format. It was also easy to put in your pocket. The first issue had a print run of 2000 and had a disproportionate reaction from the music and style media bringing in subscribers and advertising, notably the NME and Time Out.

While the contents of each issue followed a pattern of featuring homegrown talent alongside comics from around the world, with an emphasis on European BD and American "art comics", the roster of artists changed regularly, with new creators appearing in each issue. Despite, or perhaps because of, the wide range of styles and approaches featured in the magazine, Escape maintained a distinct identity and a loyal, if diverse, readership. As the comics industry evolved throughout the 1980s, Escape documented these changes and sought to influence the direction of the medium.

== The Titan years ==
Example of the typography used for the Escape logo and interior headline text from issue eight. Designed by Peter Stanbury.

In 1986 Escape changed to the larger industry standard American magazine format (8.25"x11") enabling them to reprint work by the international creators they'd previously only written about. Jacques Tardi and Gary Panter appear in issue eight and George Herriman's Krazy Kat became a regular feature. The logo also changed to a bold new design with extra prongs for the E and A and the magazine took on a more professional feel. Of the twelve issues published in this format eight had covers by non-British illustrators as Escape moved away from its small press origins and fully embraced a more international, Art-based ideology.

A year later, and after protracted negotiations, Escape became the first periodical to be published by Titan Books, a graphic novel repackaging house responsible for collections of Judge Dredd and American titles such as Swamp Thing. Gravett and Stanbury retained complete editorial control over the contents and direction of the magazine (despite some pressure from Titan). Despite a 60% sell-through on predominantly London-based newsstands, Titan were reluctant to push for wider national distribution and after two years and ten issues, they parted company. A third, more ambitious, incarnation was planned but failed to find a backer, and Escape folded in 1989.

== Partial return ==
In a late 2009 interview Gravett described his plans for 2010 which involve launching Escape Books followed, eventually, by a return of the magazine:

Peter Stanbury and I are reviving Escape as an independent publishing house early next year. We're envisaging presenting both some of the former Escape artists from the original incarnation, and new artists who have emerged since or are emerging now. A number of projects are hatching including the first in a line of Comica reference books about comics and a range of graphic novels and graphic short story compendiums, and related events and exhibitions. Further ahead, the magazine itself will be relaunched.

To this date, although Escape magazine has not yet returned to publication, Escape Books has released two hardcover graphic novels, The Great Unwashed by Warren and Gary Pleece in 2012 and There's No Time Like The Present by Paul B. Rainey in 2015.

== Escape Publishing ==
Alongside the magazine itself, Escape Publishing served as an imprint for self-contained graphic novels. These included the following:

- Alec by Eddie Campbell (1984)
- Alec: Love and Beerglasses by Eddie Campbell (1985)
- Alec: Doggie in the Window by Eddie Campbell (1986)
- Doc Chaos 1 by Phil Elliott, Lawrence Gray and Dave Thorpe (1985)
- London's Dark by James Robinson and Paul Johnson (1989, co-published with Titan Books)
- The Night Of The Busted Nose by Phil Laskey (1986)
- Violent Cases by Neil Gaiman and Dave McKean (1987, co-published with Titan Books)

Two exhibition booklets were also produced under the Escape banner:

- Comic Iconoclasm for the "Swiped! Comics in Art" exhibition at the ICA in London. This was also printed in Escape issue eleven (1987).
- The Black Island for the "Britain in Bande Dessinées" exhibition at the French Institute in London.

== Reviews ==
- Imagine #8
- Imagine #9
- Imagine #277

== Legacy ==
The influence of Escape on subsequent publications and movements is not in doubt, but somewhat hard to pin down.

Publications such as Deadline and Heartbreak Hotel shared the combination of comic strips by relative newcomers and lifestyle articles designed to reach a non-comics audience.

There are notable influences too on Fleetway's experiments with comics for more mature audiences. Later issues of Crisis featured Paul Grist and reprinted European work while the short-lived Revolver employed Escape regulars Rian Hughes and Julie Hollings amongst others.

While, with the exception of Eddie Campbell, the core group of artists associated with Escape did not necessarily go on to great riches, the magazine did publish early work by notable creators including Neil Gaiman, Dave McKean, Paul Johnson, James Robinson and Rian Hughes.

For the British small press scene Escape, along with Fast Fiction, had been an important focal point both artistically and socially. This continued into the 1990s with the magazine holding a pivotal place in the history of the scene.

International distribution brought Escape artists American exposure, most notably to the cartoonists informally known as the Highwater Books scene. Highwater publisher Tom Devlin and cartoonist Tom Hart both cite Escape, and Glenn Dakin in particular, as influential in forming their attitudes towards comic art. Canadian cartoonist Seth wrote about the influence Chris Reynolds had on him.

It should, however, be remembered that Escape was part of a wider and at the time quite vibrant environment in British comics and that artists did move freely from publication to publication. While the magazine did carve out an important niche and break new ground, the work of Knockabout Books and Warrior and aspects of the Harrier Comics line should be taken into account.

The Comics Journal wrote of Escape that it "...remains one of the most sorely missed comics of all time, not simply because of its tremendous track record of translating European comics but simply because it was always good in so many ways."

== The Escape artists ==
The core group of artists featured in Escape came mainly from the British small press and underground comix scenes of the late 1970s and early '80s.

- John Bagnall
- Eddie Campbell
- Glenn Dakin
- Phil Elliott
- Hunt Emerson
- Paul Grist
- Myra Hancock
- Rian Hughes
- Shaky Kane
- Bob Lynch
- Woodrow Phoenix (aka Trevs Phoenix)
- Ed Pinsent
- Warren and Gary Pleece
- Chris Reynolds
- Savage Pencil
- Carol Swain

== See also ==
- Fast Fiction
