= Phil Elliott =

British comic book creator

- Born: 1960 (age 65–66)
- Areas: Writer, Penciller, Inker, Letterer, Colourist
- Notable works: Tales From Gimbley

Phil Elliott (born 1960) is a British comic book creator who was published in Escape Magazine. He was part of the British small press comics scene in the 1980s.

== Career ==
After contributing spot illustrations to comic fanzines such as Bemusing and The Panelologist in the mid 70's, Elliott decided to try his hand at publishing his own fanzine and, with the help of Ian Wieczorek and Paul Chester released Blitzine, followed by Delapsus Resurgam. In 1977 Elliott, with co-editors Paul Chester and Ian Wieczorek, published the comics fanzine Elipse. Elipse ran for three issues and printed early strips by Kev F Sutherland, Mike Matthews, and Dave Hine as well as Elliott himself. Elipse was a unique fanzine at the time, featuring solely comic strips.

In the early 1980s Elliott became re-acquainted with an old comic collecting friend, Paul Gravett, who was working on Pssst! magazine. Unable to get his work published in Pssst!, Elliott decided to return to self-publishing and, with Ian Wieczorek again, released the Fast Fiction comic, which took its name from the Fast Fiction comics distribution service.

One of the artists Phil chose to publish in Fast Fiction was Eddie Campbell. Elliott collaborated with Campbell between 1984 and 1986 on various comic strips that ran in the music paper Sounds and drew the first issue of Campbell's Lucifer. Elliott was also responsible for colouring many of the covers of Campbell's comics for Harrier Comics.

Elliott also formed a strong creative partnership with Glenn Dakin, which resulted in comics such as Greenhouse Warriors, Mr Night and The Man from Cancer.

Elliott was a regular contributor to the influential UK comic magazine Escape, and in 1985 Escape published his Doc Chaos comic. Doc Chaos was written by Dave Thorpe and Lawrence Gray.

In 1985 Elliott began drawing The Suttons for his local newspaper, The Maidstone Star. This comic strip ran for three years. A collection of all The Suttons strips was published in 2020.

After handing over the editorship of Fast Fiction to Ed Pinsent, Elliott began editing !GAG! for Harrier Comics. Harrier Comics also published Elliott and Paul Duncan's four-issue Second City comic as well as two collections of Elliott's A Tale from Gimbley stories — Some Tales From Gimbley and More Tales From Gimbley.

Elliott has worked in some capacity for most of the major comic publishers in the US and UK. His comic Blite was published by Fantagraphics. He was an artist on The Real Ghostbusters comic for Marvel UK and was the colourist on the first seven issues of Paul Grist's superhero comic book, Jack Staff. Other work has appeared in Punch, Knockabout, Fox Comics and Power Rangers. Elliott coloured Paul Grist's series Demon Nic which was published in the Judge Dredd Megazine. He has also coloured various Doctor Who comics for IDW Publishing.

=== Recent work ===
Other comic work includes MAN FROM ZODIAC for Shift Comics,TUPELO, Absent Friends and Rockpool Files for Slave Labor Graphics and Illegal Alien for Dark Horse Comics. A 184-page collection of Elliott's Tales From Gimbley, titled In His Cups - collected Tales From Gimbley was published in August 2014.

== Influences ==
Elliott's early influences were mainly US comic book artists, including Bernie Wrightson, Barry Smith and Jeff Jones. Elliott was later influenced by the European ligne claire, or Clear Line, artists such as Hergé and Joost Swarte. Eddie Campbell, along with Glenn Dakin and Ed Pinsent have also had a major influence on Elliott's work and outlook.

== Bibliography ==
Comics work includes:

- Illegal Alien with writer James Robinson, 80 page graphic novel, Kitchen Sink Press, softcover, 1994, ISBN 0-87816-297-6; reprinted in 2003, Dark Horse Comics, softcover, ISBN 1-56971-824-5, Titan Books, hardcover, ISBN 1-84023-580-2;
- The Rockpool Files with writer Glenn Dakin, SLG Publishing, softcover, 2009, ISBN 978-1-59362-101-8;
- In His Cups - collected Tales from Gimbley, 184 page comic, softcover, 2014, ISBN 978-1-291-95524-8
