= Julian Hanshaw =

British cartoonist

- Born: January 1971 (age 55) Hemel Hempstead, Hertfordshire, U.K.
- Areas: Cartoonist, Animator
- Notable works: The Art Of Pho; I'm Never Coming Back; Tim Ginger

Julian Hanshaw (born January 1971) is a British cartoonist best known for his graphic novels The Art Of Pho, I'm Never Coming Back, and Tim Ginger.

== Early years ==
Hanshaw attended The National Film and Television School where he studied animation for three years. His graduation animated film, The Church of High Weirdness, featuring the voice of Matt Lucas, won a Golden Reel Award — the Verna Fields Award for Best Sound Editing in a Student Film — in Los Angeles for its sound design.

After graduation, Hanshaw worked in the UK animation industry directing/designing/storyboarding on a number of projects for companies including Arte, Channel 4, Disney UK, and the BBC. Hanshaw then worked as a senior animator on such BAFTA-winning children's series as Yoko! Jakamoko! Toto!, The Secret Show, and Charlie and Lola.

== Work in comics ==
Hanshaw won The Observer/Comica Graphic Short Story Prize in 2008, a national competition run in conjunction with the UK national Sunday newspaper The Observer and Comica, the London International Comics Festival. The judging panel included head of Jonathan Cape, Dan Franklin; graphic novelist Rutu Modan; and journalist Rachel Cooke — they picked Hanshaw's piece "Sand Dunes and Sonic Booms" as the overall winner.

- The Art Of Pho (Jonathan Cape, 2010) — Hanshaw's first graphic novel. A work that Academy Award-winning author/illustrator Shaun Tan described as, "Part travelogue, part dream, part cookbook all wrapped in an intriguingly designed rice paper roll: the Art Of Pho is deliciously surreal." After favorable reviews the book was picked up by Dutch-based media company The Submarine Channel in 2011 who began to make the book into an online interactive motion comic. Directed by Lois van Baarle with Hanshaw taking on a designer role, the project won the 2012 Prix Europa award in Berlin and three Lovie Awards at a 2012 ceremony in London.
- I'm Never Coming Back (Jonathan Cape, 2012) — Hanshaw's second book is a collection of short stories including his Observer/Comica award winner, "Sand Dunes and Sonic Booms." The stories intertwine on themes and geographical locations. Rutu Modan (Exit Wounds) said of the book, "I was captured by the subtle humour and the imaginative way Julian Hanshaw tells his stories. This was followed by a deep longing for home, which we share."
- Hoax: Psychosis Blues (2014) — Ravi Thornton gathered together ten UK illustrators and graphic novelists including, Hanshaw, Bryan Talbot, Hannah Berry, and Karrie Fransman, to illustrate sections of the book which dealt with the suicide of the author's brother. The project was also made into a stage production that premiered at the Royal Exchange, Manchester.
- Tim Ginger (Top Shelf Productions, July 2015) — a tale of a man in his later years coming to terms with his life choices. A tale that takes in cricket, conspiracy theories, and being childless by choice. Dave McKean described the book as, "Ginger is an understated, wryly observed and welcome addition to this gathering of new voices." Tim Ginger was nominated for Best Book at the 2015 British Comic Awards and Best Graphic Novel by the Los Angeles Times.
- Not Everyone Rises (2015) — Commissioned by the National Heritage, Hanshaw completed five site-specific comics that were positioned on or near to historical events that occurred between Hastings and Rye on the South Coast of the UK. The comic panels used written and oral history to illustrate key local events, one being the RNLB Mary Stanford disaster, 1928, in which the 17-man crew drowned.
- Cloud Hotel (Top Shelf Productions, June 2018) — a science fiction autobiography based on the events in Hertfordshire 1971 when the author had an encounter with an Unidentified Flying Object. Shaun Tan has described the book as, "Crisp of line and hypnotically peculiar, Hanshaw deftly suspends us between dream and reality, as good comics do. As in life, the harder we look the more we see, and the stranger things invariably become."
- I Feel Machine (Self Made Hero, September 2018) — I Feel Machine is an anthology edited by Hanshaw and fellow UK comic artist Krent Able. Based on the theme of technology, Hanshaw and Able invited prominent creators from around the world to contribute to the book. These are: Eisner Award-winner Tillie Walden, Academy Award-winner Shaun Tan, Ignatz Awards-winner Box Brown, and Erik Svetoft. Each artist, including Hanshaw and Able, contributed a 22-page story to the anthology. Jeff Lemire described the book as: "I Feel Machine is a truly glorious thing. Some of my favourite cartoonists in the world between two covers, exploring one of my favourite themes. The ultimate comics machine!" Shaun Tan's story from the anthology, "Here I Am", was nominated for Best Short Story at the 2019 Eisner Awards.
- I Feel Love (Self Made Hero April 1, 2021; delayed from the original release date of September 2020 due to COVID-19) — I Feel Love is the second anthology edited by Hanshaw and Krent Able. Contributing alongside Hanshaw and Able are the comic creators Benjamin Marra, Anya Davidson, Kelsey Wroten, and Cat Simms. Each creator contributed a "dark and twisted" love story. Paul G. Tremblay states, "I Feel Love is by turns hilarious, disquieting, sexy, icky and all sorts of messed up in the best way."

== Exhibitions ==
In 2014 Hanshaw took part in "When Will The Creeps Meet" at London's Orbital comic shop alongside artists such as Krent Able and Shaky Kane. A book was published in conjunction with Your Days Are Numbered magazine. Alongside Your Days Are Numbered magazine founder Steve Turner, Hanshaw organized a group exhibition that took place in Paris and also Europe's oldest comic shop, Lambiek, in Amsterdam in May/June 2015.

Since 2010 Hanshaw has worked closely with the UK-based Vietnamese restaurant chain Pho as an illustrator. Hanshaw has designed posters/cards/wallpapers and bespoke in-house designs for the restaurants.
