= Manga: The Complete Guide =

Book by Jason Thompson

- Cover of Manga: The Complete Guide, featuring artwork from Negima!: Magister Negi Magi, Fullmetal Alchemist, Fruits Basket, and Naruto.
- Author: Jason Thompson
- Language: English
- Subject: Manga
- Genre: Encyclopedia
- Publisher: Del Rey
- Publication date: October 9, 2007
- Publication place: United States
- Media type: Print (Paperback)
- Pages: 592 pp (first edition)
- ISBN: 978-0-345-48590-8
- OCLC: 85833345
- Dewey Decimal: 741.5/952 22
- LC Class: PN6790.J3 T56 2007

Manga: The Complete Guide is a 2007 encyclopedia written by Jason Thompson and published by Del Rey which provides basic details and short reviews of over 1000 Japanese manga titles that have been translated and released in English in North America. Though Thompson is listed as the author on the cover, some titles' entries were initially written by other reviewers, which Thompson later edited.

== Development ==
Jason Thompson was a manga editor for Viz Media in 2000 when he first began wanting to craft a manga encyclopedia. At the time, there was little interest in publishing it, so Thompson remained at Viz. Thompson became the first editor in chief of the company's newly launched Shonen Jump manga anthology. The magazine was highly successful, but Thompson wanted to work on his own projects and stepped down after six issues when Viz declined his request to switch to part-time work. In 2005, Del Rey approached Thompson about his idea for a manga encyclopedia, reviving the project. It took two years to compile the book, and Thompson resigned from Viz to do so. The main difference between Thompson's original concept and the published version is that he originally intended the work to be organized by artist rather than title, and wanted to place more emphasis on manga's relationship to the more popular anime medium.

While Thompson is listed as the book's author, a group of twenty-four other writers helped craft some of the entries, brought in when Thompson "started to stress from all the workload". Thompson then read and corrected the entries if he felt they were inaccurate. The other writers included Patrick Macias, Patricia Duffield, Julie Davis, Derek Guder, Carl Gustav Horn, Hannah Santiago, Leia Weathington, Shaenon Garrity, and Mark Simmons, a Gundam expert.

== Synopsis ==
Each title has at least a one paragraph description that includes the demographic (shōjo, shōnen, seinen, or josei), a rating out of four stars, and an age advisory, including a description of any objectionable content. Boys' love and "adult" manga each have their own section at the back of the book. In addition to covering individual titles, Manga: The Complete Guide includes information on the basics of the Japanese language and a glossary containing information on numerous anime and manga related terms, concepts of manga culture like magical girl and dōjinshi, and Japanese pastimes seen in many of the translated manga.

== Reception ==
Mania.com criticized the paperback packaging as being "flimsy" and felt it overrated strange manga and was impatient with longer series, but that it compensated for these shortcomings by its "sheer usefulness". The Library Journal noted that there are only "a few minor instances of incomplete information" in the volume, and found it "highly useful for reference, readers' advisory, and collection development" of libraries.

Anime News Network described it as "highly addicting" and said it provided something for readers at all levels of knowledge of manga. While Comic Book Bin described it as an indispensable reference for writing about manga, Ain't It Cool News noted that it had "less personality" than Helen McCarthy and Jonathan Clements' The Anime Encyclopedia: A Guide to Japanese Animation Since 1917. Manga: The Complete Guide was nominated for an Eisner Award in 2008, under the category "Best Comics-Related Book", but lost to Douglas Wolk's Reading Comics: How Graphic Novels Work and What They Mean.

== 365 Days of Manga ==
In June 2007, Thompson noted that he is contracted to update the book, but the format the update would take had not been decided. In September 2009, Thompson announced that the reviews he had compiled since the publication of the first edition would be released online as part of his "365 Days of Manga" project. In conjunction with the new reviews, Thompson announced he was giving away most of his manga in a competition. As of September 21, 2010, Thompson had given away approximately 2,850 manga volumes.

== See also ==
- Manga: Sixty Years of Japanese Comics
- The Mammoth Book of Best New Manga
