= Earth-616 =

Universe in Marvel Comics

- First appearance: Motion Picture Funnies Weekly #1 (uncirculated, created in 1939, retroactive continuity); Fantastic Four #1 (Nov. 1961)
- Created by: Alan Moore; Alan Davis; Dave Thorpe

In-universe information
- Type: Marvel Comics multiverse
- Publisher: Marvel Comics

In the Marvel Comics multiverse, Earth-616 is the primary continuity in which most Marvel Comics titles take place.

== Origins of the term ==
The designation "Earth-616" has its origins in Captain Britain comics from the early 1980s and can be attributed to both Dave Thorpe and Alan Moore. The term was first used in "Rough Justice", a story credited to both Alan Moore and Alan Davis published in July 1983 by Marvel UK in the seventh issue of the anthology comic The Daredevils. Due to this, it is often credited to Moore, though Davis said in 2007 that the term had been internally established earlier by Thorpe, who was the previous writer for Captain Britain, as part of the "Captain Britain folklore". He said that it came from a variation on the number of the beast, picked because Thorpe disliked the modern superhero genre and expressed this in various ways in his stories, including recording his opinion of the Marvel Universe with the 616 designation. As a coincidence, 616 was discovered as a variant of 666 both with the Codex Ephraemi Rescriptus and Papyrus 115 in 2005.

In a 2019 interview with Rich Johnston, Thorpe confirmed that the number was derived from subtracting 50 from 666, but that the reference to the number of the beast was because the designation was intended for the "Crooked World" of the Jaspers' Warp storyline. However, when Moore wrote the story for The Daredevils, the Crooked World was designated Earth 238, and Earth 616 was used by Saturnyne to differentiate Brian Braddock, the Captain Britain of the regular Marvel Comics universe, from the other members of the Captain Britain Corps, each of which inhabit different universes.

After its use in The Daredevils, the designation was later used by the American branch of Marvel Comics in the Excalibur title, which frequently referred to Captain Britain's early UK-published adventures. This comic was written by Chris Claremont, who had created Captain Britain, and pencilled by Alan Davis, the artist on the UK-published series. Davis later had a run as both writer and artist on the book.

== References to Earth-616 ==
Any Marvel comic book since Motion Picture Funnies Weekly #1 that is not explicitly designated an alternate universe or timeline is assumed to take place within the Earth-616 continuity. It is the "status quo" that all other universes diverge from and iterate on. Earth-616 is referred to by name numerous times over the decades, primarily in Marvel UK titles, in Excalibur, or in Marvel reference texts such as the guide to Alternate Universes (2005). In addition, there are a number of other references to Earth-616:

- In Marvel 1602 #6 (March 2004), Uatu refers to the universe as Earth-616.
- In Marvel Knights 4 #15 (April 2005), Earth-616 is mentioned.
- In Uncanny X-Men #462 (September 2005), an alteration in reality of Earth-616 causes trans-temporal devastation, and Saturnyne attempts to destroy that particular temporal continuity to "cauterize the wound".
- In all the issues of Deadpool Kills Deadpool (July 2013), the story centers around the timeline of the Earth-616 Deadpool rather that any of the alternate universe versions.
- In Secret Wars, the universe where the main story line takes place is referred to as Earth-616.

The term has also appeared in Exiles (in, among others, the House of M tie-in issues) and is in regular use by the writers of Marvel's Official Handbooks for the simplicity of the term.

There has been at least one attempt within Marvel canon to change the designation of Earth-616. In the final story arc of X-Man (issues #71–74), writer Steven Grant began to refer to the planet as "Earth-611" due to the destruction of several other Earths (which were all apparently "higher on the list" of the Multiverse than the Marvel Earth) by a godlike entity. This change, an allusion to the events of DC's Crisis on Infinite Earths, was not adopted by other writers.

== In other media ==
=== Marvel Cinematic Universe ===
- In Agents of S.H.I.E.L.D. S1E3, agent Melinda May refers to the “Bus” as “Shield-616”.
- Earth-616 is referenced in Thor: The Dark World (2013), where the term is seen on Erik Selvig's blackboard.
- In the Iron Fist episode "Heart of the Dragon" (2018), "code 616" is referred to as a police code for superpowered targets.
- In Avengers: Endgame (2019), Ant-Man's van is held in a storage area labeled "616".
- In Spider-Man: Far From Home (2019), Mysterio claims that the main Marvel Cinematic Universe continuity exists on Earth-616.
- In Doctor Strange in the Multiverse of Madness (2022), Christine Palmer of Earth-838 informs Doctor Strange that the Illuminati named his universe Earth-616.
- In Deadpool & Wolverine (2024), Wade Wilson of Earth-10005 travels to Earth-616 and attempts to join the Avengers, but is turned away by Happy Hogan.

=== Other films ===
- In Spider-Man: Into the Spider-Verse (2018), Earth-616 is seen in a monitor along with other Earths, while Peter B. Parker arrives on Earth-1610 (the home universe of Miles Morales) when the interdimensional machine starts malfunctioning.
- The sequel Spider-Man: Across the Spider-Verse (2023) designates Peter B. Parker as from "Earth-616B".

== Editorial reaction ==
Former Marvel editor-in-chief Joe Quesada and executive editor Tom Brevoort have each stated their dislike for the term Earth-616.

I can tell you for sure that those of us actually working on the books virtually never use the term–and I kind of wince inside whenever I hear somebody use it. It just sounds so stupid to my ear, and so counter to the kind of mindset we try to foster in regards to the stories we create and the thinking we try to employ.

— Marvel Executive Editor Tom Brevoort

I never use it, I hate the term pure and simple and agree with Tom's assessment of it. I can't remember ever hearing it in the office and only really see it used online for the most part. I think the term really came into vogue when the Ultimate Universe came into prominence, but in my world, the language and distinctions are simple, there is the Marvel Universe and the Ultimate Universe. Anything other than that reeks of all that DC Earth 1, Earth 2, Earth Prime stuff which I've never really taken to, but then again, I got into DC when they got rid of all that stuff so it was from and for a different era than my own.

— Marvel Editor-in-Chief Joe Quesada, 2007
