= Ctrl.Alt.Shift =

Activist project

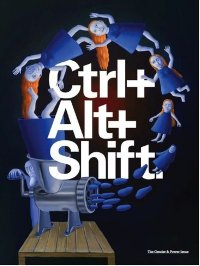
- 'The Gender & Power Issue'
- Editor: Chantelle Fiddy
- Categories: Activism
- Frequency: Quarterly
- Country: United Kingdom
- Language: English
- Website: http://www.ctrlaltshift.co.uk

Ctrl.Alt.Shift was an initiative politicising a new generation of activists for social justice and global change. It was a project of UK aid and development charity Christian Aid.

== Magazine and website ==
Ctrl.Alt.Shift was founded by Katrin Owusu and published the first issue of its magazine in June 2008. The magazines continued until 2010 and the website until mid-2011. It has published issues focusing on 'HIV & Stigma' and 'Gender & Power'. The magazine was edited by blogger and columnist Chantelle Fiddy who also helped edit the website. The website featured regular columnists and staff writers such as Dwain Lucktung, Eva Baker, Russell Myrie and Bibi van der Zee alongside user-generated content.

== Direct action ==
In November 2008, Ctrl.Alt.Shift launched the 'Nothing to Declare' project – a series of demonstrations with the intention of exposing the stigma created by HIV travel bans. The project was co-organised by activist pressure group Plane Stupid, with grime star Tinchy Stryder lending his support outside the Russian embassy. The protests targeted the London embassies of Russia, South Korea and Saudi Arabia, and were covered by CNN. On 8 March 2009, International Women's Day, Ctrl.Alt.Shift marched through Guildhall in London to raise awareness of the 50 million women missing in India due to female foeticide.

== Cultural interventions ==
Ctrl.Alt.Shift garnered widespread media attention for its involvement in a number of arts-based cultural interventions, each of which has focused on a different area of social injustice in developing countries.

=== Sadler's Wells 'HIV/Aids and Stigma' Dance Event ===
In November 2008, it held a showcase of dance, film and music based on the stigma surrounding HIV/Aids at Sadler's Wells, London. Nitin Sawhney and Carlos Acosta were mentors and there was a performance by JME of Boy Better Know.

=== VICE 'Gender, Poverty and Power' Photo Competition ===
In early 2009 a photo competition run in conjunction with VICE magazine focused on Gender, Poverty and Power. Nan Goldin acted as an ambassador and Alexa Chung, Alex Sturrock, Ben Rayner, and Andy Capper were mentors. The winners were exhibited in February at the Association of Photographers in London.

=== BALTIC 'Conflict: War & Peace' Art Exhibition ===
In March 2009, Ctrl.Alt.Shift launched an art exhibition at BALTIC which focused on war and conflict in Colombia and Latin America as a whole. The exhibition took place over two floors of the building and featured work produced by 12 students and recent graduates from Newcastle University's LifeWorkArt programme. It also featured specially commissioned works from south London photo-artist Matthew Stone and installation artist Graham Hudson, who acted as project mentors. Urban sculptor and photographer T-Magic, street artist Benjamin Wachenje and BALTIC freelance artists, Alison Unsworth and Paul Merrick also featured, and David Shrigley was Creative Ambassador.

=== Short Film Project ===
On 14 May 2009, Ctrl.Alt.Shift premiered five short films: "1000 Voices", "HIV: The Musical", "Man Made", "No Way Through" and "War School". The films were directed by 7 young, talented, up and coming film makers; Tim Travers Hawkins, Joe Patrick & Tim Woodall, Fern Berresford, Ben Newman and Shelia Menon & Alex Monro who were helped out by established directors Aoife McArdle, Chris Harding from Shynola, Kinga Burza, Paul Andrew Williams and Jim Threapleton. The films were scored by the likes of Young Knives, The Thirst, Chipmunk, Shy Child, Metronomy, Denis Jones, and Jesca Hoop, and featured performances from Adam Buxton, Julian Barratt, and Martin Freeman. The poster art for the films was featured in Creative Review.

=== Ctrl.Alt.Shift Unmasks Corruption ===
Ctrl.Alt.Shift Unmasks Corruption is a 2009 comics anthology edited by Paul Gravett which features short graphical stories looking at examples of corruption in the real world. It includes contributions by such creators as Pat Mills, Bryan Talbot, Dave McKean, Woodrow Phoenix, Peter Kuper, Dylan Horrocks, and Dan Goldman. An exhibition was held at the Lazarides Gallery in London in 2009 — in conjunction with Gravett's Comica festival — to mark the launch; the exhibition included examples of misguided previous attempts to produce worthy comic books.
