= Strange Weather Lately =

1996-99 comic series by Metaphrog

Strange Weather Lately comics and graphic novels
- Date: 1996 to 1999
- Main characters: Martin Nitram
- Series: Strange Weather Lately
- Publisher: Metaphrog

Creative team
- Writers: metaphrog, John Chalmers
- Artists: metaphrog, Sandra Marrs

Original publication
- Published in: 1996 to 1999
- Language: English

Strange Weather Lately is the title of a series of comics created and released between 1996 and 1999 by the Glasgow-based Franco-Scottish duo Metaphrog.

The very first issue was entitled Strange Weather Lately - Martin Nitram #1 and comprised a series of short comic stories along with a hand-numbered print, released in 1996. It was followed by a longer story, beginning in Strange Weather Lately #2 and continuing in a series of ten cult comics published bimonthly until 1999 when the collected story was released in two graphic novels. Metaphrog used creative marketing to promote the releases of their books and comics, creating Strange Weather Lately cans of beans and tea bags as well as posters, bookmarks and flyers.

The Sunday Herald in Glasgow described Strange Weather Lately as "the existential adventures of Martin Nitram, an unpaid theatre worker engaged in an attempt to mount a cursed play, The Crimes Of Tarquin J Swaffe."

Strange Weather Lately was the first ever graphic novel to appear at the Edinburgh International Book Festival.

Metaphrog have gone on to produce the popular and critically acclaimed Louis (graphic novel) series.

Cover for Strange Weather Lately - Martin Nitram #1 comic book by metaphrog. Published in 1996.

Cover for Strange Weather Lately #2 comic book by metaphrog. Published in 1998.

Cover for Strange Weather Lately Volume Two graphic novel by metaphrog. Published in 1999.

== Sources ==
- Long interview with Metaphrog by Gavin Lees for The Comics Journal: https://www.tcj.com/the-metaphrog-interview/
- The 20th anniversary of Strange Weather Lately: http://papercutz.com/metaphrog-celebrates-comics-anniversary
- Sequential Tart interview by Jennifer M. Contino, "Lies, Letters, and the Strange Weather": http://www.sequentialtart.com/archive/nov01/metaphrog.shtml
