= Emma Rendel =

Swedish cartoonist

Emma Rendel (born c. 1976 in Uppsala) is a Swedish graphic novel author, artist and illustrator who lives and works in Stockholm.

Emma Rendel studied Illustration at Central St Martins and Communication Arts and Design at the Royal College of Art in London. Her graphic stories have been published in magazines such as Galago, Icon magazine, Le Gun and Art Review, and her illustrations have been used by: Time Out, Form and Battersea Arts Centre. Rendel has participated in various exhibitions including COMICA at the Institute of Contemporary Arts, London, 2008 and Cut my legs off and call me shorty! at Tensta Konsthall, 2009. She is currently teaching illustration in a Visual Communications course at Konstfack.

Rendel is credited with coining the term "awkwardist" in an article by Paul Gravett, originally published in Art Review, London. This term coincides with the theme of "social awkwardness leading to sinister repercussion" that she achieves throughout all of her short graphic novels.

== Books ==
- The Vicar Woman (Published by Jonathan Cape, London, 2012) (ISBN 978-0-224-09139-8)
- Allt Är Allrajt (Published by Kartago Förlag, Stockholm, 2009) (in Swedish) (ISBN 978-91-86003-25-8)
- Pentti and Deathgirl (Published by Jonathan Cape, London, 2009) (ISBN 978-0-224-08506-9)
- The Awkwardists (Self-published, London, 2006)
- Deathgirls Birthday (Self-published, London, 2005)
- Deathgirls Diary 2 (Self-published, London, 2005)
- Deathgirls Diary 1 (Self-published, London, 2005)
