= Pssst! =

British comics magazine

- The cover of pssst! #1 by Angus McKie and John Higgins.

Publication information
- Publisher: Never–Artpool
- Schedule: Monthly
- Format: Ongoing series
- Publication date: Jan. – Oct. 1982
- No. of issues: 10

Creative team
- Artist(s): Bryan Talbot, Glenn Dakin, Shaky Kane, Ed Pinsent, John Watkiss, John Bolton, John Higgins Angus McKie, Paul Johnson
- Editor(s): Mal Burns

Pssst! (styled as pssst!) was a short-lived British comics magazine published by Never–Artpool in 1982. Pssst!, which lasted ten monthly issues, was an attempt to publish a British equivalent of the lavish French bande dessinée magazines.

Bryan Talbot, Glenn Dakin, Shaky Kane, Paul Johnson, Stephen Baskerville, Ed Pinsent, John Watkiss, John Bolton, John Higgins, and Angus McKie were amongst the many cartoonists published within the pages of pssst!. Early parts of Talbot's The Adventures of Luther Arkwright were published in the comic.

Talbot feels that pssst! "...was the precursor of Escape and Deadline and the rest of the cascade of British adult comic mags that came out in the Eighties and Nineties." Critic Russell Willis, on the other hand, wrote of the publication, "It tended towards Heavy Metal tits, ass and girls-with-butterfly-wings style over any lasting substance."

== Overview ==
Early in his career, British comics expert Paul Gravett worked for pssst!; he described his experiences on his website:

Pssst! ... was the misguided dream of a delightfully wacky and wealthy French couple, Serge and Henriette Boissevain, who were convinced that a British attempt at the sort of luxurious 'adult' bande dessinée magazine that sold in France would make a fortune here; instead, it nearly lost them theirs.

I had started at pssst! late in 1981 as their promotions man, touring England in the middle of winter ... on a double-decker London bus. Outside, its side windows were covered and painted with wild cartoon graphics, while inside, the seats downstairs had been removed to make a shop, and the seats upstairs were kept to form a cinema screening a back-projected, sound-and-light comics slideshow, for adults only.

On the road, one of my duties was to seek out new artists and we found more than we could imagine. One discovery when we hit Manchester's art college was curly-haired student Glenn Dakin, whose devilish cartooning on Temptation quickly made it into pssst! magazine.

In the end, after being hounded out of town by irate council officials and scraping ice off the inside of the windows (thankfully we never had to sleep on the bus), it was a relief to be taken off the road for good.

I got an ideal job back at the offices as traffic manager, coordinating artwork and interviewing potential contributors. There was a buzz to opening each day's submissions and presenting them to the weekly editorial meetings. I got to see loads of art and artists and I learnt a lot about magazines, both what to do and what not.

== Publication history ==
Pssst! was produced by a division of Never Limited called Artpool Limited, owned by Serge Boissevain and Henriette Bentinck Boissevain. The company was based in London, at 38 Mount Pleasant in Clerkenwell. Psssst was distributed by Seymour Press Ltd. In late 1981, Paul Gravett left his role as manager of Fast Fiction — a stall at the bimonthly Westminster Comics Mart which sold bande dessinée — to work as promotions manager for pssst!.

According to Talbot, each issue was about "fifty pages, printed on top quality glossy paper and with the highest production values."

Early parts of Talbot's The Adventures of Luther Arkwright were published in pssst! (the first parts having been published in the British underground comic Near Myths in 1978–1980). Talbot "reworked the chapters that [he'd] already done for Near Myths but by around issue five or six [he] was drawing new ones."

Grant Morrison and Tony O'Donnell went to London for a meeting with pssst!'s publishers, who said they wanted to publish Morrison's Gideon Stargrave stories as well as some of their other work. Morrison said, "I'd done a new Gideon Stargrave story... it's my favourite one I've ever done in my life and it's never been seen anywhere." Pssst!, however, was canceled before it was published, leading Morrison to "feel that [he] was some kind of albatross".

Talbot's Arkwright storyline, less than half complete, was interrupted again when pssst! was canceled in 1982.

As Gravett writes, "Put together by committee, pssst! was a camel of a magazine, which was forced to close after ten issues.

== Legacy ==
In 1983, Gravett and Peter Stanbury formed Escape magazine, with a mandate similar to that of pssst!, and which lasted until the end of the 1980s.

As he shut down pssst!, publisher Serge Boissevain collected all of Talbot's Luther Arkwright stories — including the material from Near Myths — in the trade paperback (TPB) The Adventures of Luther Arkwright Book 1: Rat Trap. Thanks to Valkyrie Press, between 1987 and 1989 Talbot completed the story, which was published as a series of nine standard comic books. In 1987, Boissevain paid for the printing of the Valkyrie Press TPB, The Adventures of Luther Arkwright Book 2: Transfiguration. And then, in 1989, under the publisher name Proutt, Boissevain published the final Luther Arkwright TPB, Book 3: Götterdämmerung.
