= Shaky Kane =

British writer and psychedelic artist

- Born: Michael Coulthard
- Areas: Writer, Penciller, Inker, Letterer
- Pseudonyms: Shaky Kane; Shaky 2000; Michael Waspman
- Notable works: A-Men; The Bulletproof Coffin

Michael Coulthard is a British writer and psychedelic artist who best known for his work as a comic and graphic artist under the pseudonym Shaky Kane, as well as Shaky 2000.

== Biography ==
After working for independent comics and magazines like Pssst!, Escape, and Deadline in the 1980s, Shaky moved to the mainstream with work on 2000 AD and its sister title, the Judge Dredd Megazine in the 1990s. With editor David Bishop, he created the Soul Sisters, and he also contributed to the Judge Dredd strip, among others.

Shaky's style is heavily influenced by Silver Age American comic books (especially the style of Jack Kirby), with a psychedelic twist.

He also provided the art for The Bulletproof Coffin with writer David Hine for Image Comics, which is where he has published his recent projects.

== Bibliography ==
Comics work includes:

- "The Reet Petite Postcard Set" (in Escape Magazine #1, 1983)
- "Johnny Tomorrow" (in Escape Magazine #2, 1983)
- "Andy" (in Escape Magazine #6, 1985)
- "King of Rock and Roll" (in Escape Magazine #7, 1985)
- A-Men (in Deadline)
- Space Boss (in Deadline)
- Pinhead Nation (Revolver #1-6, 1990)
- "The Contact" (script and art, with additional pencils by Brett Ewins, in A1 #5, 1991, ISBN 1-871878-39-X)
- Judge Dredd:
  - "Judge Planet" (with Peter Milligan and co-artist Jo Flatters, in Judge Dredd Mega Special 1991)
  - "Judge Planet II" (with Si Spencer, in Judge Dredd Mega Special 1995)
- Soul Sisters:
  - "Soul Sisters" (with David Bishop and Dave Stone, in Judge Dredd Megazine (vol. 2) #2-9, 1992)
  - "Untitled" (with Dave Stone, in Judge Dredd Yearbook 1993, 1992)
- Mytek the Mighty: "Mytek Lives!" (with Si Spencer, in 2000AD Action Special, 1992)
- Tharg's Terror Tales: "Uncanny Dr Doctor" (with Mark Millar, in 2000 AD #860, 1993)
- Soul Gun Warrior (with Alan McKenzie):
  - "Soul Gun Warrior" (in 2000 AD #867-872, 1993–1994)
  - "Soul Gun Assassin" (in 2000 AD #920-925, 1994–1995)
- Tharg's Future Shocks: "Nightmare Patrol!" (with Kek-W, in 2000 AD #948, 1995)
- Vector 13 (writing):
  - "Case One: Who Was the Mothman?" (with John Ridgway, in 2000 AD #951, 1995)
  - "Case Three: The Blackwater Incident" (with David Bircham, in 2000 AD #1026, 1997)
- Black Star Fiction Library #1-2 (Black Star Fiction Library, 2002)
- The Bulletproof Coffin #1-6 (with writer David Hine, Image Comics, 2010)
- Elephantmen #33: The Beautiful Bones (with writer Richard Starkings, Image Comics, 2011)
- Monster Truck graphic novel (Image Comics, 2012)
- The Bulletproof Coffin: Disinterred #1-6 (with writer David Hine, Image Comics, 2012)
- Elephantmen #46: Sleeping Partners: Part Five (with writer Richard Starkings, Image Comics, 2013)
- Satanic Mojo Comix #1: Jesus Is A Lie SAMOCO, 2013)
- That's because you're a robot one-shot (with David Quantick, Image Comics, 2014)
- Cap'n Dinosaur one-shot (with writer Kek-W, Image Comics, 2014)
- Last Driver (with writer C.S. Baker, Dead Canary comics, 2016)
- "The 1000 Yard Stare (A Bulletproof Coffin One-Shot!) (with writer David Hine, Image Comics, 2017)
- Beef #1-6 (with writer Tyler Shainline, Image Comics, 2018)
- Kane & Able (with Krent Able, Image Comics, 2021)
- Crime Destroyer True Til Death (with Jason T. Miles, Floating World Comics, 2021)
- Weird Work (with Jordan Thomas Image Comics, 2023)
- Monster Fan Club (with Jason T. Miles, Floating World Comics, 2024)
