= Manga: Sixty Years of Japanese Comics =

2004 book by Paul Gravett

- Author: Paul Gravett
- Language: English
- Subject: Manga
- Genre: Encyclopaedia
- Publisher: Laurence King; Harper Design
- Publication date: July 19, 2004
- Publication place: United States; United Kingdom
- Media type: Print (Paperback)
- Pages: 176 pp (first edition)
- ISBN: 978-1-85669-391-2

Manga: Sixty Years of Japanese Comics is a 2004 encyclopaedia written by Paul Gravett. It was published in 2004 by Laurence King in the United Kingdom and by Harper Design in United States. It gives an overview of most of the famous manga works and historical evolution since 1945. Osamu Tezuka had the privilege to have a whole chapter about his works in the encyclopaedia.

== Controversy ==
Manga: Sixty Years of Japanese Comics were pulled from the shelves of all San Bernardino County, California, libraries because Bill Postmus, Chairman of the county's Board of Supervisors, said, "that book is absolutely inappropriate for a public library and as soon as I was made aware of it yesterday, I ordered it to be removed immediately". To circumvent Postmus' ban on the book, Barstow Community College allowed the book to be displayed but not to be checked out.

== Reception ==
David Welsh from Comic News Flipped commends Paul Gravett's "journalist's fluidity" when writing his book. The Times praised the book by saying, "Gravett’s solidly researched study ... includ[es] in its 176 pages bountiful full-colour illustrations that do not shirk the erotic and horror sides of adult manga".
