= Glenn Dakin =

British cartoonist and children's author

- Born: 1960 (age 65–66) UK
- Areas: Cartoonist, Writer, Artist
- Notable works: Temptation; Abe

Glenn Dakin (born 1960) is a British cartoonist and author of children's books. He is the author of the Candle Man book series, and he contributed to a number of British comics magazines including Escape and Deadline, and was part of the British small press comics scene in the 1980s. His main creations are Temptation and the semi-autobiographical strip Abe.

== Career ==
While at college in Manchester Dakin was drawing Abe for his college magazine when he met Paul Gravett, who introduced him to the concept of self-publishing comics in zine form and distributing them via the mail and Gravett's Fast Fiction service. While initially dismissive, he soon became interested, corresponding with Eddie Campbell and Phil Elliott amongst others. Dakin has cited Tove Jansson's Moomin strip cartoons and novels as an influence for Abe and the optimistic melancholy present in his work.

Dakin had work published in pssst! in 1982, and when Gravett launched Escape Magazine Dakin became a regular contributor. He also had strips in the Australian anthology Fox Comics. By the late '80s he was publishing comics through the Harrier Comics' New Wave imprint including Paris, The Man of Plaster (with Steve Way) and the anthology Gag! He also co-edited, wrote and drew Sinister Romance with Woodrow Phoenix. Temptation, "which was visually inspired by George Herriman's Krazy Kat and Johnny Hart's B.C.," had a run in Escape, and found a home in Deadline magazine. It was later published as a collection by Penguin Books in 1991. Dakin collaborated with Phil Elliott on numerous strips including Mr Day and Mr Night, Greenhouse Warriors and The Man From Cancer.

Dakin was employed by Marvel UK for a period where he wrote the comics ClanDestine and The Real Ghostbusters amongst others.

His Abe strips were collected by Top Shelf Productions in 2001 under the title Abe: Wrong For All The Right Reasons. Temptation was reissued by Active Images in 2004. Both have introductions by Eddie Campbell.

Dakin currently writes children's books, develops and writes children's television shows for the BBC and has a regular strip, Robot Crusoe, in The Sunday Times.

== Influence ==
Dakin has been cited by a number of American cartoonists, especially those connected to the publisher Highwater Books, as a major influence on their attitudes towards comics.
