= Metaphrog =

Graphic novelist duo

John Chalmers
- Born: 25 August 1965 (age 61) Scotland
- Areas: Writer, Graphic Novelist
- Pseudonym: Metaphrog
- Notable works: Louis (comic)

Sandra Marrs
- Born: 23 November 1973 (age 52) France
- Areas: Artist, Writer, Graphic Novelist
- Pseudonym: Metaphrog
- Notable works: Louis (comic)

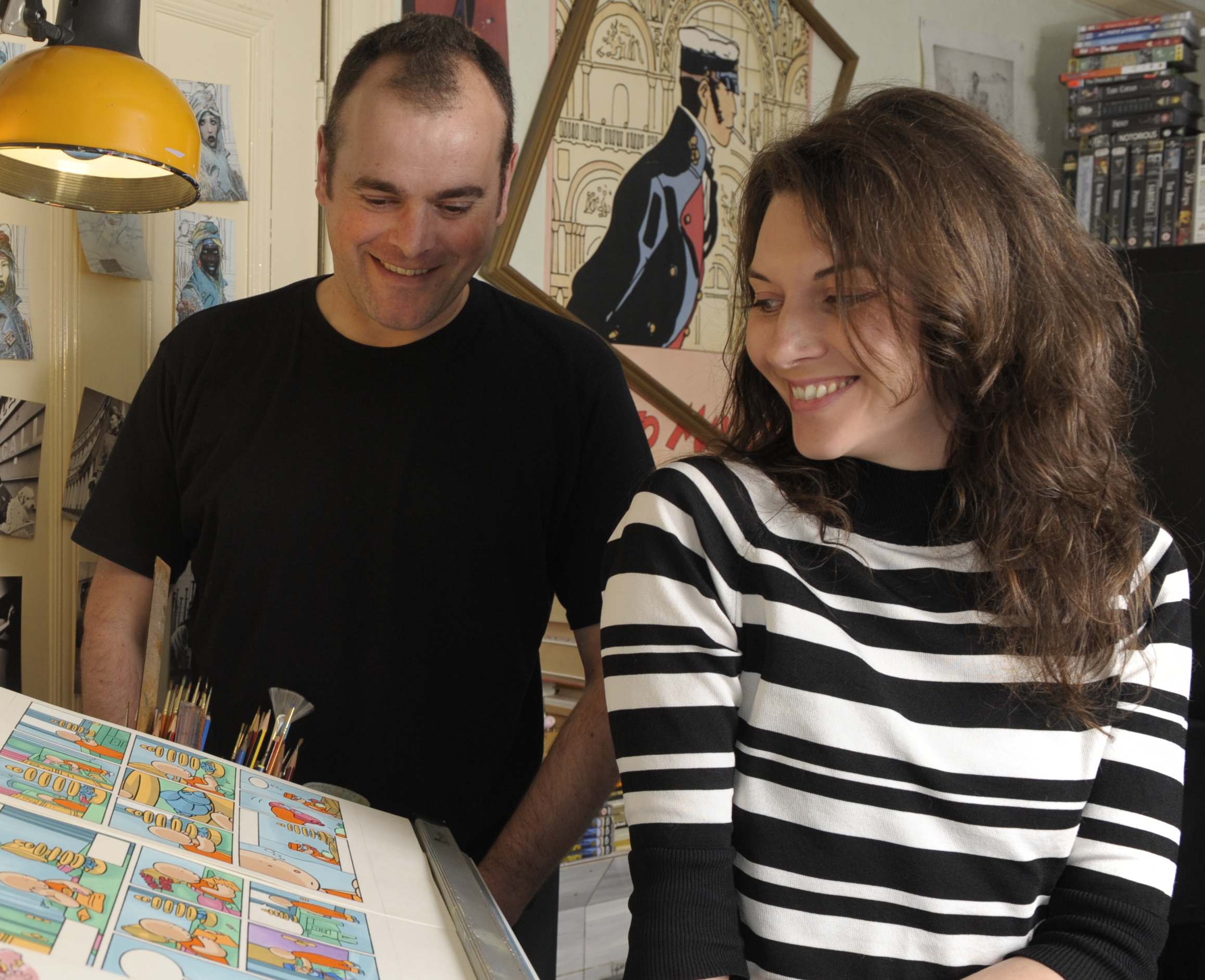
John Chalmers and Sandra Marrs are Metaphrog. They are graphic novelists who created 'Louis' and The Red Shoes and Other Tales. Photographed at their home.

Metaphrog are graphic novelists Sandra Marrs and John Chalmers, best known for making the Louis series of comics.

== History ==
Marrs is originally from France, where she studied Arts and Letters. Chalmers is from the west of Scotland and has a scientific background with a PhD in Electronic and Electrical Engineering in Micromachining. Together they live in Glasgow.

In general, Marrs draws the comics while Chalmers writes the scripts. They started their first comic together, Strange Weather Lately, in 1995. The Sunday Herald in Glasgow described Strange Weather Lately as "the existential adventures of Martin Nitram, an unpaid theatre worker engaged in an attempt to mount a cursed play, The Crimes of Tarquin J Swaffe."

The Strange Weather Lately comics ran for 10 issues until 1999, and were then collected into two graphic novels.

They then moved on to the Louis (graphic novel) series, which includes Louis - Red Letter Day, Louis - Lying To Clive, Louis - The Clown's Last Words, Louis - Dreams Never Die and Louis - Night Salad. In 2011, they redrew and repainted Louis - Red Letter Day and this new version was published in hardback.

Louis - Red Letter Day and Louis - Lying to Clive were also each published as a webcomic on serializer.

Metaphrog were part of a collection of 80 artists from three continents to express their "visions and thoughts on the oft-forgotten aspects War" for the book Warburger published by Stripburger in 2003.

Metaphrog teamed up with the UK-based record label Fat Cat Records in 2004 to create Louis - Dreams Never Die. For this, musicians hey (from Berlin) and múm (from Iceland) reworked a music track inspired by the Louis books, and Metaphrog made a short animation. The result was a multimedia project with a graphic novel and cd/blue vinyl 7".

They have been commissioned to work on several projects, including an adaptation of the poem "The First Men on Mercury" by Edwin Morgan (poet) in comic form. On National Poetry Day 2009, 35,000 copies of the pamphlet published by the Association for Scottish Literary Studies were distributed to all Glasgow Secondary Schools. Other commissioned works include: Skint! for the Scottish Book Trust in 2010 and, in revised form, in 2014; The Photographs for Glasgow Life and Time to Shine: Graphic Novel for Creative Scotland in 2013.

Their work has been exhibited at The British Library, The London Print Studio, The Lakes International Comic Art Festival, The National Library of Scotland, Scotland House in Brussels and Dundee University. The duo travel extensively across the country to promote the medium of comics, visiting schools, libraries, museums, festivals, sharing their experience of making comics. They have given talks at Gordonstoun school, Glasgow School of Art, and visited international school in Europe.

In 2015 Papercutz published The Red Shoes and Other Tales, a collection of graphic fairy tales adapted from Hans Christian Andersen along with "The Glass Case," an original short story. This collection was followed by an adaptation of The Little Mermaid in 2017.

Metaphrog are Patrons of Reading 2013–2017 at Northfield Academy in Aberdeen and were Writers in Residence at the Edinburgh International Book Festival 2015. They are the winners of The Sunday Herald Scottish Culture Awards Best Visual Artist 2016.

From January to April of 2022, Metaphrog's comic work was exhibited at The Park Gallery, Callendar House as part of Scotland’s Year of Stories 2022. It included pages from their graphic novels as well as their adaptation of the poem The First Men on Mercury. Parts of the exhibition went on to tour at The Mitchell Library, Carnegie Library, and Moat Brae.

== Bibliography ==
=== Graphic novels ===
- Strange Weather Lately:
  - Vol. One (1998)
  - Vol. Two (1999)
- Louis:
  - Red Letter Day (2000)
  - Lying to Clive (2001)
  - The Clown's Last Words (2002)
  - Dreams Never Die (Fat Cat Records, 2004)
  - Night Salad (2010)
  - Red Letter Day new edition (2011)
- The Red Shoes and Other Tales (Papercutz, 2015)
- The Little Mermaid (Papercutz, 2017)
- Bluebeard (Papercutz, 2020)
- Harris and Grace (Collins Big Cat, 2023)
- Freya (Collins Big Cat, 2023)

=== Comic books ===
- Strange Weather Lately #1 - #10 (1996–1999)
- The Maze Part One and Part Two (1997)
- Vermin (1999)

=== Short stories ===
- 9/11 Emergency Relief, Alternative Press (US - 2002)
- Alan Moore: Portrait of an Extraordinary Gentleman, Abiogenesis Press (UK - 2003)
- Warburger, Stripburger (Slovenia - 2003)
- SPX Anthology (US - 2003)
- Autobiographix, Dark Horse (US - 2003), Ediciones Glenat (Spain - 2005) and Kappa Edizioni (Italy - 2005)
- Variant (Winter 2004)
- The Big Issue in Scotland (Xmas Special 2005)
- Variant cover art + illustrated story (Winter 2006)
- New Writing Scotland 30 (2012)

=== Webcomics ===
- Louis: Red Letter Day, on serializer (2003–2004)
- Louis: Lying to Clive, on serializer (2006–2007)

=== Animation ===
- Louis - Dreams Never Die (2004)

== Awards ==
- 2000: Eisner Award nominations, "Best Title for a Younger Audience", "Best Graphic Album - New", Louis - Red Letter Day
- 2001: Ignatz Award nomination, "Promising New Talent", Louis - Red Letter Day
- 2011: Eisner Award nomination, "Best Coloring", Louis - Night Salad
- 2011: Highly Commended for the Scottish Children's Book Awards
- 2011: Shortlisted for the Leeds Graphic Novel Awards
- 2011: Longlisted for the YALSA Great Graphic Novels for Teens
- 2016: Winners of The Sunday Herald Scottish Culture Awards Best Visual Artist
- 2018: Winner of the Excelsior Award Junior
- 2018: Winners of the SICBA Comic Book Awards: Outstanding Achievement to Comics

== See also ==
- List of magazines published in Scotland

== Sources ==
- "Favourite book festival moments: Metaphrog". The Guardian. 28 August 2011.
- "Metaphrog on graphic novels and the creative process". Creative Scotland. 12 November 2014.
- "Catching up with Metaphrog". Creative Scotland. 28 October 2015.
- Burchill, Julie (23 August 2003). "THE GRAPHIC TRUTH". The Guardian.
- Gravett, Paul (2005). Graphic Novels: Stories to Change Your Life. Aurum Press. ISBN 978-1845130688.
- Jamieson, Teddy (16 April 2017). "Stories will be our salvation: Glasgwegian cartoonists Metaphrog on the art of story and the story of their art". The Sunday Herald.
- Lees, Gavin (28 September 2011). "The Metaphrog Interview". The Comics Journal.
- Mann, Natasha (20 November 1999). "Who to Watch: Sandra Marrs and John Chalmers". The Scotsman. Archived from the original on 2018-11-20 – via HighBeam Research.
- Szadkowski, Joseph (17 August 2002). "Books that give color to mankind's darker side". The Washington Times.
- Wild, Abigail (18 September 2004). "Punks of publishing; Their comic books have become cult hits". The Herald. p. 3.
- Withrow, Steven; Danner, Alexander (2007). Character Design for Graphic Novels. Focal Press/Rotovision. ISBN 0240809025.
- Jamieson, Teddy (28 January 2022). "Metaphrog, Mark E Smith and Callendar House". The Herald.
