= Louis (comics) =

Graphic novel series by Metaphrog

Louis Graphic Novel
- Cover to Louis - Dreams Never Die.
- Date: 2000 - present
- Main characters: Louis, FC, Clean & Jerk
- Publisher: Metaphrog / Fat Cat Records

Creative team
- Writers: metaphrog, John Chalmers
- Artists: metaphrog, Sandra Marrs

Louis is a graphic novel series created by metaphrog, the Franco-Scottish duo Sandra Marrs and John Chalmers.

== Series overview ==
Louis is an unasumming worker who lives in Hamlet with his companion FC (short for Formulaic Companion), his pet mechanical bird. He spends his days filling bottles with air, making fruit, and writing to imaginary aunts. His neighbours Clean and Jerk often try to get him into trouble.

In The Guardian, Julie Burchill has said of Louis that he is the "most adorable character", while The Comics Journal wrote: "Louis himself is cut from the same cloth as Charlie Brown and Jimmy Corrigan".

Louis - Red Letter Day was published on Serializer.net. i-D described Louis - Red Letter Day thus: "With squibs for eyes and delicately inked circles for nose and mouth, Louis' reduced features magically express a life spent daydreaming, writing letters to possibly fictional aunts and reading signs that say 'you look like a potato'. Infused with shadowless light and written in precisely elusive balloons Louis - Red Letter Day is a seriously spaced enigma from Metaphrog aka Glaswegian cult artists John Chalmers and Sandra Marrs. Like nothing else around."

Six graphic novels have been released so far. Their fourth, Louis - Dreams Never Die, was released in 2004 in association with the UK based label Fat Cat Records. For this, Hey (from Berlin) and múm (from Iceland) wrote two music tracks inspired by the Louis books, and metaphrog made a special short animation. The result was a multimedia project with a graphic novel and cd/blue vinyl 7".

In 2011, they redrew and repainted Louis - Red Letter Day and this new version was published in hardback.

== Publication history ==
- Louis - Red Letter Day (2000) ISBN 0-9534932-5-3
- Louis - Lying to Clive (2001) ISBN 0-9534932-7-X
- Louis - The Clown's Last Words (2002) ISBN 0-9534932-9-6
- Louis - Dreams Never Die (2004) ISBN 0-9545984-0-7
- Louis - Night Salad (2010) ISBN 978-0-9545984-1-9
- Louis - Red Letter Day New Edition (2011) ISBN 97809545984-2-6

== Awards and recognition ==
Louis is a multiple Eisner Award and Ignatz Award nominee.
Louis - Red Letter Day:
Eisner Award nominations for "Best Title for a Younger Audience" and "Best Graphic Album - New, 2000
Ignatz Award nomination, "Promising New Talent", 2001
Louis - Night Salad
Eisner Award nomination for "Best Coloring", 2011

Highly Commended for the Scottish Children's Book Awards, 2011
Leeds Graphic Novel Awards shortlist, 2011
YALSA Great Graphic Novels for Teens longlist, 2011

== Sources ==
- Review of Louis - Night Salad in The Comics Journal: http://classic.tcj.com/alternative/louis-night-salad-by-metaphrog/
- Burchill, Julie (August 23, 2003). "Weekend: THE GRAPHIC TRUTH". The Guardian https://www.theguardian.com/lifeandstyle/2003/aug/23/weekend.julieburchill
- Review of Louis - Dreams Never Die in Publishers Weekly: https://www.publishersweekly.com/978-0-9545984-0-2
