= Ed Pinsent =

British cartoonist, artist, and writer

- Born: Edward Pinsent; 1960 (age 65–66) Liverpool, England
- Areas: Cartoonist, artist, writer

Edward Pinsent (born 1960) is a British cartoonist, artist, and writer.

== Biography ==
Ed Pinsent is the son of the classical scholar John Pinsent and was brought up in the city of Liverpool.

Pinsent has written and drawn his own small press comics since 1982, including characters such as Primitif, Henrietta and Windy Wilberforce. Around 1987 he took over Fast Fiction, the market stall, magazine, mail order distributor and news sheet that played a key role in the history of British small press comics. It existed in its various forms from 1981 through to 1990 under the stewardship of Paul Gravett, Phil Elliott and Ed Pinsent. The name was taken from a Classics Illustrated knock-off spotted in the Overstreet Comic Book Price Guide. Pinsent, who had been aware of the cassette culture music trading scene, subsequently took over from Elliott and continued to run things until 1990. Fast Fiction #30 in 1991 was the last issue of the flagship magazine which Pinsent edited. Following the closure of Fast Fiction the mailing list was passed on to Luke Walsh and Mike Kidson, who used it to launch the small press comics review zine Zum!.

Pinsent's comic strip work has also appeared in the pages of pssst!, Escape Magazine, Knockabout Comics, and Fox Comics in Australia. Between 1990 and 1996 he produced a handful of comics, including The Staring Eye, a collaboration with the Cumbria-based artist / painter / poet Denny Derbyshire, which ran four issues. Pinsent also maintained some contact with the small press through Zum! and Caption.

In 1996, Pinsent published the first issue of The Sound Projector Music Magazine, devoted to reviews of experimental music. In November 2009, the self-published small-run magazine published its 18th issue. In 2004, Pinsent began making regular weekly broadcasts of The Sound Projector Radio Show for Resonance FM, the London-based art radio station.

== Bibliography ==
Published work includes:

- Illegal Batman, self-published, 1989.
- Desperate Failure Comics, self-published, 1992.
- Henrietta La Folle, self-published, 1992.
- Windy Wilberforce in The Saga of the Scroll, Slab-O-Concrete Publications, 1995. ISBN 1-899866-00-0.
- Windy Wilberforce in Voice of The Wilberforce, Kingly Books, 2003. ISBN 0-9531639-3-8.
- Primitif in Sting of the Arrow / Land of the Dead, Kingly Books, 2006. ISBN 0-9531639-7-0.

== See also ==
- Escape Magazine
- British small press comics
- Davy Francis
