= Savage Pencil =

English comics artist, musician and journalist

- Born: Edwin Pouncey; June 1951 (age 75) Leeds, West Riding of Yorkshire, England
- Area: Artist
- Pseudonym: Savage Pencil

Edwin Pouncey (born June 1951), also known by the nom de plume Savage Pencil, is an English comics artist, musician, and music journalist.

== Biography ==
As Savage Pencil and otherwise, Pouncey has contributed to magazines such as Sounds ("Rock'n'Roll Zoo", etc.), Forced Exposure and The Wire. He has illustrated record sleeves for bands such as The Fall, Big Black, Sonic Youth and Rocket From The Crypt amongst others. Savage Pencil was also a member of The Art Attacks, a band who released two 7"s; "I'm A Dalek" b/w "Neutron Bomb" (released on the Albatross label in 1977) and "First & Last" / "Punk Rock Stars" / "Rat City" (released on the Fresh label in 1979).

He is currently a member of the "improvising drone-rock noise band" Pestrepeller, along with Peter Hope-Evans (ex-Medicine Head), Ed Pinsent, Harley Richardson, Nick Neocleous and Rob Brown. They released an album in May 2006 on Important Records, entitled Isle of Dark Magick, described in the press release as "a gem of free-improvised-found-sound-collage enriched with dark pagan folky vibes and supernatural horror noise dedicated to H. P. Lovecraft, Clark Ashton Smith and Austin Osman Spare." AllMusic described them stating "There's a kind of loopy charm to the oddball British band Pestrepeller".

== Other sources ==
- Savage Pencil at Lambiek's Comiclopedia
