= Fast Fiction =

1980s UK small press comics distributor

Fast Fiction was a market stall, magazine, mail order distributor, and news sheet that played a key role in the history of British small press comics (featuring work by rising stars such as Warren Ellis, SMS, Glenn Dakin, Phil Elliott, and Rian Hughes). It existed in its various forms from 1981 through to 1990 under the stewardship of Paul Gravett, Phil Elliott and Ed Pinsent.

The name "Fast Fiction" was taken from a Classics Illustrated knock-off spotted in the Overstreet Comic Book Price Guide.

== History ==
Paul Gravett started the Fast Fiction stall at the bimonthly Westminster Comics Mart in London, England, in 1981, selling imported European comics, or bande dessinée. Having discovered that interesting new British comics were being published in short-run photocopy form, he contacted the creators and offered to sell their comics on his stall and through mail order. Initially, this was done for free, with a small percentage cut being introduced later. The Fast Fiction stall became the de facto social centre for small press publishers, along with the adjoining pub, The Westminster Arms.

Cartoonist Phil Elliott and Ian Wieczorek took over Fast Fiction in late 1981 when Gravett started working for Pssst!, magazine (leading to him launching Escape Magazine). The bimonthly stall and mail-order distributor continued, along with a regular information sheet listing titles available to order, and a new anthology featuring cartoonists they sold. This was also called Fast Fiction, debuting in 1982 with a print run of 100 copies, and lasting until 1991 (with issues #29 and #30 reviewed in Zum! #1).

Ed Pinsent, another cartoonist who had been involved in the cassette culture music trading scene, subsequently took over from Elliott and continued to run things until 1990.

Following the closure of Fast Fiction, its mailing list was passed on to Luke Walsh (later known as Luke Temple Walsh) and Mike Kidson, who used it to launch the small press comics review zine Zum!.

== See also ==
- British small press comics
- Escape (magazine)
