= Paul Johnson (comics) =

British comic book artist (born 1958)

- Born: 13 October 1958 (age 68) Dulwich, London
- Areas: Penciler, Inker, Painter
- Notable works: The Books of Magic, Mercy, Aliens

Paul Johnson (born 13 October 1958) is a British comic book artist.

== Biography ==
Paul Johnson orbited the peripheries of the British comic book industry in the early 1980s, self-publishing and appearing in short-lived publications such as Pssst! and Escape. His first major comics work was the graphic novel London's Dark but he came to international attention when he painted the art on The Road to Nowhere, the fourth and final chapter of The Books of Magic mini-series, written by Neil Gaiman and released by DC/Vertigo in 1993.

Johnson worked abroad for Marvel Comics (Interface, Hellraiser, Children of the Voyager), DC Comics (Mercy, Invisibles, Legends of the Dark Knight) and Dark Horse Comics (Aliens) before working in Britain's home-grown industry for Crisis, 2000 AD, and the Eaglemoss publication Spinechillers.

In 2000 Johnson was awarded a grant by the Arts Council of Great Britain to run a series of comic book workshops with Ed Hillyer (also known as Ilya) at Great Ormond Street Hospital, resulting in the publication of Hospitales, which was distributed free of charge in hospitals across the UK.

In addition to his interest in comics, Johnson wrote regularly for the IPC music magazine Uncut from 1999 to 2004.

Influenced by the work of European comics artists such as Moebius (Jean Giraud), Hugo Pratt, Alberto Breccia and Lorenzo Mattotti, Johnson struggled to find work that interested him as most commercial publishers failed to make the jump from producing superhero comics to the more esoteric genres of their continental counterparts.

Disillusioned with the opportunities available to him, Johnson retrained as an acupuncturist and herbalist. He is now in private practice and lectures regularly at LCTA, England's largest college dedicated to teaching Traditional Chinese Medicine. He is the chief presenter on How To Locate Acupuncture Points - The Definitive DVD, released in 2008.

== Bibliography ==
Comics work includes:

=== Escape Publishing ===
- London's Dark (with James Dale Robinson, 50 pages, graphic novel, Titan Books, 1989, ISBN 1-85286-157-6)
- "Bomber's Tears" (with James Dale Robinson, in Escape Magazine #19, Autumn 1989)

=== Marvel Comics ===
- Interface #1-#6 (with James D. Hudnall, Epic, December 1989 – October 1990, tpb collects the 6 issue mini-series as Espers/ Interface, Image Comics, 1998 ISBN 1-58240-050-4)
- Jihad #1-#2 (with D. G. Chichester, 48 pages per issue, Epic, December 1991)
- End paper illustrations in Clive Barker's Hellraiser #13, Epic 1992
- "Death, Where is Thy Sting?" (with Malcolm Smith, in Clive Barker's Hellraiser #19, Epic 1992)
- Children of the Voyager #1-#4 (with Nick Abadzis, September 1993 – December 1993)
- "Children of the Voyager: Epilog" in Marvel Frontier Comics Special #1 (with Nick Abadzis, January 1994)
- Behold, The Man Thing Parts 1-4 (with Simon Jowett, in Marvel Comics Presents #164-#167, October–November 1994)
- The Birth of Him illustration in Marvel Comics Portraits of a Universe Book 2, April 1995
- Death of Electra illustration in Marvel Comics Portraits of a Universe Book 3, May 1995

=== DC Comics ===
- The Books of Magic: "The Road to Nowhere" (with Neil Gaiman, 1990, tpb collects the 4 issue mini-series, DC, 1993 ISBN 1-56389-082-8)
- Mercy (with J. M. DeMatteis, 62-page one shot, Vertigo, 1993)
- The Invisibles #16: "London" (with Grant Morrison, Vertigo, January 1996, tpb The Invisibles: Apocalipstick collects Vol. I issues #9-#16, DC, 2001 ISBN 1-56389-702-4)
- The Invisibles #21: "Liverpool" (with Grant Morrison, Vertigo, June 1996, tpb The Invisibles: Entropy in the UK collects Vol. I issues #17-#25, DC, 2001 ISBN 1-56389-728-8)
- Batman: Legends of the Dark Knight #102: "Spook: Part I" (with James Dale Robinson, January 1998)
- Batman: Legends of the Dark Knight #103: "Spook: Part II" (with James Dale Robinson, February 1998)
- Batman: Legends of the Dark Knight #104: "Spook: Part III" (with James Dale Robinson, March 1998)
- Batman Cover to Cover hardback includes the cover to Batman: Legends of the Dark Knight #104: "Spook: Part III", 2005 ISBN 1-4012-0659-X)

=== Dark Horse Comics ===
- Aliens: Sacrifice (with Peter Milligan, May 1993, collected in tpb Dark Horse Comics Aliens: Salvation/ Sacrifice, 2001, ISBN 1-56971-561-0)

=== Fleetway ===
- Tharg's Future Shocks: "Red Giant" (with Peter Hogan, in 2000 AD #892, 1994)
- Tharg's Terror Tales:
  - "The Succubus" (with Alan McKenzie, in 2000 AD #894, 1994)
  - "The Operatives" (with Nick Abadzis, in 2000 AD Winter Special, 1994)
  - "The Devil you know" (with Nick Abadzis, in 2000 AD #936, 1995)
- Judge Dredd:
  - "Flashback 2099: The Return of Rico" (with Pat Mills, in 2000 AD #950-952, 1995)
  - "Family Feud" (with Chris Standley, in Judge Dredd Megazine #3.01, 1995)
- Janus: Psi Division:
  - "House of Sighs" (with Grant Morrison, in 2000 AD #953, 1995)
  - "A New Star" (with Mark Millar, in 2000 AD #980-984, 1996)
  - "Faustus" (with Grant Morrison and Mark Millar, in 2000 AD #1024-1031, 1997)
- Vector 13:
  - "Case One: Extraction Point" (with Simon Jowett, in 2000 AD #988, 1996)
  - "Case Eleven: Imaginary Friend" (with Nick Abadzis, in 2000 AD #998-999, 1996)
  - "Case Eight: Midnight Rambler" (with Gordon Rennie, in 2000 AD #1069, 1997)
- Witch World: "Wolfshead" (with Gordon Rennie, in 2000 AD #1053-1054, 1997)
- Sinister Dexter (with Dan Abnett):
  - "Luck of the Irish" (in 2000 AD #1062, 1997)
  - "60 Seconds" (in 2000 AD #1064, 1997)
  - "Long to rain over us" (in 2000 AD #1072, 1997)
  - "Tan Lines" (in 2000 AD #1097, 1998)
  - "Slay Per View" (in 2000 AD # 1102, 1998)
  - "Death is a Lonely Donegan" (in 2000 AD #1111, 1998)
  - "Observations" (in 2000 AD #1181, 2000)
  - "Fear and Clothing" (in 2000 AD #1265, 2001)
- Downlode Tales: "The Ass Kickers" (with Dan Abnett, in 2000 AD #1145-1148, 1999)
- Tales of Telguuth (with Steve Moore):
  - "Talking Heads" (in 2000 AD #1192, 2000)
  - "To Become a God" (in 2000 AD #1195, 2000)
  - "The Conqueror Wummb" (in 2000 AD #1199, 2000)
- 2000 AD covers
  - Finn #927
  - Brigand Doom #932, 1995
  - Judge Dredd #939, 1995
  - Rico Dredd #951, 1995
  - Janus: Psi Division #984, 1996
  - Black Light #1005, 1996
  - Vector 13 #1023, 1997
  - Janus Psi Division #1027, 1997
  - Witchworld #1060, 1997
  - Character Montage Wraparound Winter Special, 1994

=== Eaglemoss Publications ===
- The Spinechiller Collection #1 (illustrations to Horror in the Centre Ring, 7 pages)
- The Spinechiller Collection #2 (spot illustration to Glowing Ghost)
- The Spinechiller Collection #3 (illustrations to The Cave Dwellers, 7 pages)
- The Spinechiller Collection #5 (illustrations to A Dead Man’s Chest, 7 pages)
- The Spinechiller Collection #7 (spot illustration to Spooky Submarine)
- The Spinechiller Collection #8 (illustration to Circus Puzzle, 3 pages)
- The Spinechiller Collection #10 (illustrations to Bugged!, 7 pages)
- The Spinechiller Collection #12 (illustrations to Nature’s Way, 7 pages)
- The Spinechiller Collection #15 (spot illustration to Tunnel Spooks Taxis; illustration to Ley Lines, 2 pages)
- The Spinechiller Collection #16 (illustrations to What’s The Matter With Martin?, 7 pages)
- The Spinechiller Collection #18 (spot illustration to The Booya Stones)
- The Spinechiller Collection #20 (illustration to Nazca Lines, 2 pages)
- The Spinechiller Collection #21 (illustrations to The House on Sparrow Lane, 7 pages; The Roswell Incident, 2 pages)
- The Spinechiller Collection #23 (illustrations to The Storm, 7 pages)
- The Spinechiller Collection #24 (illustration to Sitting Bull, 2 pages)
- The Spinechiller Collection #26 (illustration to Atlantis, 2 pages)
- The Spinechiller Collection #27 (illustrations to All The Time in the World, 7 pages)
- The Spinechiller Collection #31 (illustrations to Spiderbites, 7 pages)
- The Spinechiller Collection #35 (illustrations to Bungalow 14, 7 pages; spot illustration to Spectral Samurai)
- The Spinechiller Collection #46 (illustrations to Grim Reaper, 7 pages)
- The Spinechiller Collection #49 (spot illustration to Things That Go Bump; The Money Pit, 2 pages)
- The Spinechiller Collection #50 (illustrations to Night Cries, 7 pages)
- The Spinechiller Collection #51 (illustration to Dreamtime, 2 pages)
- The Spinechiller Collection #53 (spot illustration to The Death’s Head/ Hill of Demons)
- The Spinechiller Collection #54 (illustration to Face on Mars, 2 pages)
- The Spinechiller Collection #55 (illustrations to Monster Bait, 7 pages; Amelia Earhart, 2 pages)
- The Spinechiller Collection #57 (illustrations to Night of the Wolf, 7 pages)
- The Spinechiller Collection #59 (illustrations to In The Flesh, 7 pages)
- The Spinechiller Collection #60 (spot illustration to Herne The Hunter)

== Card games ==
Paul Johnson was one of the contributing artists for Dredd: The Card Game, a collectible card game released by Round Table Productions back in 1999. He created the art for the following cards:

- Fellow Judge
- I Know My Duty
- Judge Egmont
- Judge Souster
- Kevin O'Neill
- Ricochet Rounds
- Shuggy Hall
- Spot Check
- Umpty Bagging

Other trading card sets by Johnson include:

- Aliens (Dark Horse Comics, 1994; card 10)
- Vertigo (DC/Vertigo; Skybox; Mercy card)
