= Paul Gravett =

British journalist, curator, writer, and broadcaster in the comics industry

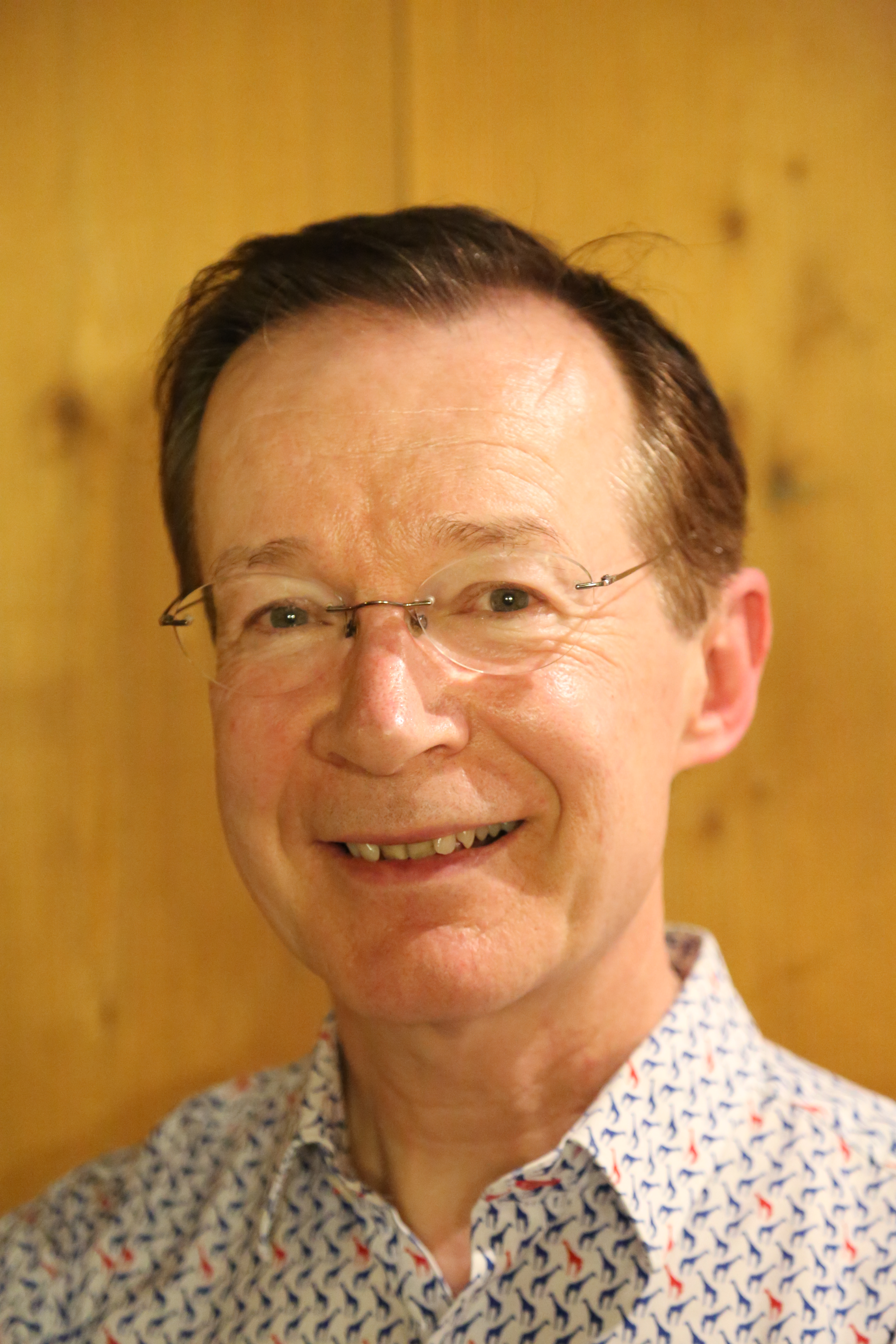
- Paul Gravett, May 2017
- Occupations: Journalist and author
- Partner: Peter Stanbury
- Writing career
- Years active: 1981–present
- Subjects: Comics, Manga
- Notable works: Escape magazine; Manga: Sixty Years of Japanese Comics; Graphic Novels: Stories to Change Your Life; Great British Comics; 1001 Comics You Must Read Before You Die; Comica
- Notable awards: UK Comic Art Award for Best Auxiliary Contributor (1990)
- Website: www.paulgravett.com

Paul Gravett is a London-based journalist, curator, writer, and broadcaster who has worked in comics publishing since 1981.

He is the founder of Escape magazine, and for many years wrote a monthly article on comics appearing in the UK magazine Comics International, together with a monthly column for ArtReview. He has written for various periodicals including The Guardian, The Comics Journal, Comic Art, Comics International, Time Out, Blueprint, Neo, The Bookseller, The Daily Telegraph, and Dazed & Confused.

== Biography ==
Gravett's career began in 1981, as he and his "longtime partner" Peter Stanbury managed the Fast Fiction table at bi-monthly Comic Marts held in Westminster Hall. Gravett invited artists to send him their homemade comics, which he would sell from the Fast Fiction table with all proceeds going to the creator. His role in the British indie comics scene is depicted in Eddie Campbell's Alec comics, in which Gravett is called "The Man at the Crossroads."

Later in 1981, Gravett was employed as promotions manager for Pssst!, an attempt to publish a British equivalent of the lavish French bande dessinée magazines.

In 1983, Gravett and Stanbury launched Escape magazine in an attempt to showcase the cream of the alternative cartoonists of the day. Under the Escape Publishing imprint, they co-published Violent Cases by Neil Gaiman and Dave McKean, three volumes of Eddie Campbell's Alec between 1984 and 1986 and London's Dark in 1988 by James Robinson and Paul Johnson. Titan Publishing Group took over the publication of Escape in 1987, with Gravett also coming on board as an editor at Titan Books. Escape lasted for 19 issues before closing its doors in 1989 (when Gravett also left Titan). The Comics Journal is quoted as saying of Escape, "This ... anthology remains one of the most sorely missed comics of all time not simply because of its tremendous track record of translating European comics but simply because it was always good in so many ways."

From 1992 to 2001, Gravett was the director of the UK charity the Cartoon Art Trust, dedicated to preserving and promoting the best of British cartoon art and caricature, and to establish a museum of cartoon art with gallery, archives, and reference library.

In 2003, Gravett founded Comica, the London International Comics Festival, which he helped run until its demise in 2014. Gravett coordinated several events surrounding Comica, like Comica Comiket and the Graphic Short Story Prize contest, run in conjunction with The Observer.

Gravett has written several books on comics. He also co-edited Ctrl.Alt.Shift Unmasks Corruption, a political anthology comic produced in 2009. Gravett and Stanbury's Great British Comics: Celebrating a Century of Ripping Yarns and Wizard Wheezes was nominated for a 2007 Eagle Award for Favourite Comics-related Book.

== Bibliography ==
Gravett is the author, co-author, or editor of several non-fiction books on the topic of comics and sequential art, including:

- — (2004). Manga: Sixty Years of Japanese Comics. Harper Design. ISBN 1-85669-391-0.
- — (October 2005). Graphic Novels: Stories to Change Your Life. Aurum Press. ISBN 1-84513-068-5.
  - US edition: — (November 2005). Graphic Novels: Everything You Need to Know. Collins Design. ISBN 0-06-082425-5.)
- —; Stanbury, Peter (October 2006). Great British Comics: Celebrating a Century of Ripping Yarns and Wizard Wheezes. Aurum Press. ISBN 1-84513-170-3.
- —; Stanbury, Peter (September 2008). The Leather Nun and Other Incredibly Strange Comics. Aurum Press. ISBN 978-1845133207.
  - US edition: — (February 2009). Holy Sh*t! The World's Weirdest Comic Books. St Martin's Press. ISBN 978-0-312-53395-3.
- —, ed. (October 2011). 1001 Comics You Must Read Before You Die: The Ultimate Guide to Comic Books, Graphic Novels and Manga. Universe Publishing. ISBN 978-0-7893-2271-5.
  - 2014 edition: —, ed. (2014). 1001 Comics You Must Read Before You Die. Cassell. ISBN 978-1-84403-698-1.
- — (October 2013). Comics Art. Tate Publishing Ltd. ISBN 978-1-84976-056-0.
  - US edition: — (27 April 2024). Comics Art. Yale University Press. ISBN 978-0-3002-040-18.
- —; Dunning, John Harris (May 2014). Comics Unmasked. The British Library. ISBN 978-0-7123-5735-7.
