= Liberature =

Intellectual approach to literature

Liberature is literature in which the material form is considered an important part of the whole and essential to understanding the work.

== Description of liberature ==
Liberature refers to a new kind of literature, a trans-genre, in which the text and the material form of a book constitute an inseparable whole. The term itself is derived from the word 'literature', but draws from the Latin liber, meaning "a book" and "the free one", as well as liber meaning "measurement" or "writing as a measurement of words." In a work of liberature, text does not serve as the sole source of meaning; the shape and the construction of the book, its format, the number of pages, its typographical layout, the size and type of the font applied, pictures and photographs integrated with the text, and type of paper or other material used in the process of creation of the book are all taken into consideration. The reader confronts a work of liberature as a total package, which often assumes a non-traditional shape, the quality of which, in practice, sometimes involves a radical separation from the traditional design of the book. Its textual message dictates the physical shape that the work finally assumes. All of this lends a level of intent and control to the creator of liberature that surpasses that of other genres.

The demands posed by liberature shape a new kind of reader. In traditional texts, the reader empirically processes the text of a work in order to attain a desired level of understanding; one follows the steps of a model reader, whose purpose is to bring oneself closer to one's virtual model. Certain works diverge from this concept of linear, textual reading such as those by Umberto Eco or Roland Barthes. Such works introduce uncertainty into these structured expectations and programs of behavior. Neither the works of Eco nor Barthes constitute liberature, but they exemplify a difference in the quality of the programming of the reader's experience.

The printed works of liberature, although diverse in their application, share the following variables of the traversal function:

Dynamics:	Static
Determinability:	Determinate
Transience:	Intransient
Perspective:	Impersonal
Access:	Random
Linking:	Without links
User function:	Interpretative and explorative

Only in several instances the work may breach the above-mentioned scheme of characteristic variables of liberature. In all other cases, readers are responsible for configuring their reading of the text. Texts of liberature that generate multiple statements are not limited to literary works, and definitely not to electronic texts – the category embraces computer games and other forms of both ergodic and non‐ergodic literature. The former requires a non‐trivial effort to traverse the text. In a classical, non-ergodic literary work, such as The Odyssey, the reader is required only to turn the pages and to interpret the text. In permutative works – those in which the order of text is inconsequential - instead of static function defining the dynamics, something else occurs. An intratextonic dynamic, one that guides the reader throughout the text, occurs. The text is also not determinate, meaning that it lacks a specificity which would hinder interpretation and different readings. The ergodic character of the work is usually determined by the exploratory function of the reader. The parallel character of the works is written into the very core of liberature; the order in which the reader perceives the text governs the way the work is rendered. The interactive capacity of the work becomes, if not an aesthetic category, a way of the reader's behavior that is written into the text. The work of liberature disrupts the structure of expectations based on a syntagmatic order as well as the strategies characteristic of a linear text. The works of liberature refer to the experience of simultaneousness. Furthermore, liberature as a hybrid genre incorporating the features of numerous media at the same time, including the arts, assumes a quality of simultaneousness as a dominating one.

== Creation of the concept. Liberature avant la lettre ==
In 1999, Zenon Fajfer postulated the genre of liberature to describe the yet-undefinable work Oka-leczenie that he and Katarzyna Bazarnik had been working on. In a translated explanation of the concept, Fajfer describes liberature as "a type or genre of literature in which the text is integrated with the physical space of the book into a meaningful whole and in which all elements (from the graphic ones to the kinds of paper (or other material) and the physical shape of the book) may contribute to its meaning". Fajfer specifically cites the necessity of creating the genre because he too often sees non-traditional literary works judged only as works of art, but not as literature. After conception, the idea was developed by Katarzyna Bazarnik who, basing her reflections on the analysis of the works by James Joyce, demonstrated that the similarity of the text and the form creates iconicity. By exploring and dynamically developing the study of iconicity, a common feature of liberature, Bazarnik contributed to the consideration of liberature in the literary community at large.

Fajfer's 'liberature' is in no immediate denotational relation with various earlier uses of the word, including the English legal synonym for “livery”, the name of a program of Czech Radio, and the term coined by Julián Ríos for the novel Larva (1983).

Considering liberature anachronistically, it is noteworthy that writers began experimenting with literary forms as early as in the Baroque period. The unusual structure of the works forces the readers to focus their attention, to choose the beginning and the end of the text, and – most importantly – form another level of signification. It is an invitation to play, act, and interact with the text; this enables the text to transcend the boundaries of a given work. Its form "does not only consider a literary text a symbolic expression of a person’s subjectivity but also considered a text as determined by the level of programming and processing of signs".

In the 17th and 18th centuries, word‐games (such as rebuses, palindromes, and anagrams), all of which date back to antiquity, were employed. There were also text‐machines, texts that after being programmed were able to generate new texts. The similarity of various literary works from this period was a result of fashion, but also of using the same Latin books on poetry and rhetoric in which creating elaborate poetry, and later, prose, was one of the practice exercises.

The works that may be considered liberature avant la lettre were penned by such writers as William Blake, Blaise Cendrars, B.S. Johnson, James Joyce, Stéphane Mallarmé, Raymond Queneau, Laurence Sterne, or Stanisław Wyspiański. In the case of American postmodernist writers, Raymond Federman, Robert Gass and Ronald Sukenick come to the fore of what can be called liberature.

In Poland, some of Radosław Nowakowski's works predated the coinage of the term. Owing to discussions with Fajfer, Nowakowski found the term useful and started considering himself a writer of liberature.

One of Nowakowski's most prominent works is Ulica Sienkiewicza w Kielcach (Sienkiewicz Street in Kielce) published in 2002. Another of Nowakowski's books, Nieposkładana teoria sztuki (Noncompleted Theory of Art), first published in 1994, is composed of a pile of separate pages placed in a box which, according to the author, mirrors the "theory of puzzle[...] [w]ith the exception that not all of the elements fit[...]”. In the works where Nowakowski provides the reader with three versions of the text – Polish, English and Esperanto – one could observe certain differences in the rendition of the same topic, the technique which contributes to the further differentiation of the book's meaning.

== Development of liberature in Poland ==
In an organized manner, liberature in Poland, including both Polish texts and translated works, has been presented in the Liberatura series published by Korporacja Ha!art seated in Kraków. The first publications are:

(1) Katarzyna Bazarnik and Zenon Fajfer. (O)patrzenie. 2003.

(2) Zenon Fajfer. Spoglądając przez ozonową dziurę. 2004. Followed by its English translation, But Eyeing Like Ozone Whole. by Krzysztof Bartnicki. 2004.

(3) Stéphane Mallarmé. Rzut kośćmi nie zniesie przypadku. Polish translation of Un coup de des jamais n'abolira le hasard by Tomasz Różycki. 2005.

(4) Stanisław Czycz. Arw. 2007.

(5) B. S. Johnson. Nieszczęśni. Polish translation of The Unfortunates by Katarzyna Bazarnik. 2009.

(6) Raymond Queneau. Sto tysięcy miliardów wierszy. Polish translation of Cent mille milliards de poèmes by Jan Gondowicz. 2009.

(7) Georges Perec. Życie instrukcja obsługi. Polish translation of La Vie mode d'emploi by Wawrzyniec Brzozowski. 2009.

(8) Katarzyna Bazarnik and Zenon Fajfer. Oka-leczenie. 2009.

(9) Perec instrukcja obsługi. Various authors. 2010.

(10) Zenon Fajfer. dwadzieścia jeden liter. 2010.

(11) Zenon Fajfer. ten letters. English translation of (10) by Katarzyna Bazarnik. 2010.

(12) Zenon Fajfer. Liberatura czyli literatura totalna. Teksty zebrane z lat 1999–2009. With English translation Liberature or Total Literature. Collected Essays 1999-2009 by Katarzyna Bazarnik. Bilingual edition. 2010.

(13) Paweł Dunajko. untitled text. 2010.

(14) Krzysztof Bartnicki. Prospekt emisyjny. 2010.

(15) Herta Müller. Strażnik bierze swój grzebień. Polish translation of The Guard Takes His Comb by Artur Kożuch. Bilingual edition. 2010.

(16) Raymond Federman. Podwójna wygrana jak nic. Polish translation of Double or Nothing by Jerzy Kutnik. 2010.

(17) B. S. Johnson. Przełożona w normie. Polish translation of House Mother Normal by Katarzyna Bazarnik. 2011.

(18) Sonnet of Sonnets. Various authors. 2012.

(19) James Joyce. Finneganów tren. Polish translation of Finnegans Wake by Krzysztof Bartnicki. 2012.

== Jonathan Safran Foer ==
Liberature in the Anglo-Saxon countries is represented by Jonathan Safran Foer. Foer's hybrid, postmodern novel Tree of Codes (2010) is an example of visual writing, utilizing typesetting, images, spaces and blank pages to give the book a visual dimension beyond the prose narrative. Foer has taken his favorite book, The Street of Crocodiles by Bruno Schulz, and used it as a canvas, cutting into and out of the pages, to arrive at an original new story. In one interview the author emphasises that, although the originality of the story brought to life in such an innovative way is a very compelling feature, it was the form of the book that captivated him the most: “[…] I was more interested in subtracting than adding, and also in creating a book with a three-dimensional life. On the brink of the end of paper, I was attracted to the idea of a book that can’t forget it has a body".

== Liberature in other media ==
Although the authors creating liberature frequently apply the traditional ways of publication (chiefly paper books), they also appreciate other possibilities. Liberatic texts whose primary medium is the Internet are representative of 'e-liberature'.

Other examples include Radosław Nowakowski's works, such as the transformation of the hypertext model of the book by Nowakowski into Hala 1000 Ton, set in the old Norblin's factory (Warsaw) (2005). The project called Libro 2N, was defined as a "journey into BLIN concept", which was enacted inside a book represented by the old workshop.
