= Tom Mallin =

British writer and artist (1927–1977)

- Born: Tom Mather Mallin; 14 June 1927; West Bromwich, Staffordshire, England
- Died: 21 December 1977 (aged 50); Clare, Suffolk, England
- Education: Birmingham School of Art; Anglo-French Art Centre
- Occupations: Playwright, novelist, artist
- Spouse(s): Muriel Grace George, m. 1949
- Children: 2 sons
- Awards: Giles Cooper Award
- Website: tmallin.blogspot.com

Tom Mallin (14 June 1927 – 21 December 1977) was a British writer of novels and plays, and also an artist. Beginning his working life in the art world, as a picture restorer as well as a practising painter, illustrator, and sculptor, Mallin at the age of 43 became a full-time writer, with five novels published and several plays produced on stage and for BBC Radio before his death from cancer at the age of 50.

== Biography ==
=== Early years, family and education ===
Tom Mather Mallin was born at West Bromwich, Staffordshire, England, to Clifford Vincent Mallin (1887–1932) and his wife Olive May née Mather (1895–1978).

From 1943 to 1945 Mallin studied at Birmingham School of Art, going on to win a scholarship to the Royal Academy Schools. However, but after doing National Service he decided to study at the international Anglo-French Art Centre in London, where he met his future wife Muriel Grace George (1925–2002). He earned a living by finding employment as a Bond Street picture restorer, mainly of 17th- and 18th-century paintings, while also creating his own paintings, drawings, illustrations, prints and sculptures. Mallin and Muriel George married in 1949, moved to Clare, Suffolk, in 1955, and had two sons, Simon and Rupert.

=== Writing ===
Mallin had his first play, Curtains, produced in 1968, and went on to write many more, for both stage and radio, having a six plays broadcast on BBC Radio before his death in 1977 and others posthumously.

Turning to full-time writing in 1970, at the age of 43, he also had five novels published by Allison and Busby, the book covers featuring his own artwork.

In a 1971 article in The Guardian, Michael McNay described Mallin's first novel, Dodecahedron (1970), as "shocking", and said: "Tom Mallin's prose bleeds. His plays and novels are the flayed flesh of English language. If there had to be a visual comparison (and why not? Mallin used to be a realist painter) it would be with a crucifixion by Grunewald or a film by Bunuel." The novel was also published in the US, by Outerbridge and Lazard in 1972, to mixed reviews, with Kirkus Reviews noting that Dodecahedron owes a great deal to the playwriting genre.

Mallin's last novel, Bedrok, published in 1978, was described by Hermione Lee in The Observer as "a stylish as well as a very troubling novel". Two of Mallin's novels have been reprinted: Knut ("a darkly comic take on the gothic novel") and Erowina ("A dark, ambitious, stimulating, and challenging novel ... Tom Mallin's masterpiece, and a work that remains surprising, fresh and vital").

== Awards and recognition ==
In 1979, alongside John Arden, Richard Harris, Don Haworth, Jill Hyem, Jennifer Phillips and Fay Weldon, Mallin won a Giles Cooper Award, with his posthumous winning work being included in Best Radio Plays of 1978.

Mallin was included in The Imagination on Trial: British and American writers discuss their working methods (Allison & Busby, 1982), co-edited by Alan Burns and Charles Sugnet, which contained interviews with 10 other authors as well as Burns himself: J. G. Ballard, Eva Figes, John Gardner, Wilson Harris, John Hawkes, B. S. Johnson, Michael Moorcock, Grace Paley, Ishmael Reed, and Alan Sillitoe.

Mallin is mentioned in Dennis O'Driscoll's poem "Siblings Revisited":

"Only a few years ago, it was Jennings schoolboy stories
that I brought you. Now, I pack avant-garde books:
Tom Mallin, Alan Burns, Beckett's Shorter Plays."

== Bibliography ==
=== Novels ===
- Dodecahedron, Allison & Busby, 1970, ISBN 085031030X.
- Knut, Allison & Busby, 1971, ISBN 0850310369; new edition, with an introduction by Rupert Mallin, Verbivoracious Press, 2014, ISBN 978-9810921651.
- Erowina, Allison & Busby, 1972, ISBN 0850311314; new edition, with an introduction by Nate Dorr, Verbivoracious Press, 2015, ISBN 978-9810944704.
- Lobe, Allison & Busby, 1977, ISBN 0850312027.
- Bedrok, Allison & Busby, 1978, ISBN 0850311314.

=== Selected plays ===
- Curtains, 1968 – Edinburgh Festival's Traverse Theatre, directed by Michael Rudman; Canonbury Theatre, London, 1970; produced for radio by Guy Vaeson; published by Calder & Boyars, Playscript 57, 1971, ISBN 978-0714507927
- As Is Proper, 1971, King's Head Theatre, London
- Cot, 1971, Edinburgh Fringe Festival
- Downpour – broadcast 1971
- The Novelist, 1971, Traverse Theatre, Edinburgh; Hampstead Theatre Club
- Mrs Argent, 1972, Soho Poly, London; BBC Radio 3, 1980
- Rooms – broadcast 1973
- Birds of Prey – (not produced), 1973
- Two Gentlemen of Hadleigh Heath – broadcast 1973
- The Lodger – broadcast 1974
- Vicar Martin – broadcast 1974 (BBC Radio 3, 1976)
- Whispers (not produced), 1974
- Rowland, BBC Radio 4: The Monday Play, 4 July 1977, and BBC Radio 4: Afternoon Theatre, 27 August 1978
- Spanish Fly – broadcast BBC Radio 3, 18 September 1977
- Halt! Who Goes There?, 1977, broadcast posthumously, with Clive Swift, Rosemary Leach, 26 March 1978; winner of a 1978 Giles Cooper Award and published in Best Radio Plays of 1978 by Methuen, 1979
