= London Consequences =

1972 group novel

- First edition
- Language: English
- Genre: Collaborative fiction
- Publisher: Greater London Arts Association for the Festivals of London 1972
- Publication date: 1 May 1972
- Publication place: United Kingdom
- Media type: Print (Trade paperback)
- Pages: 157
- ISBN: 0950244708
- OCLC: 571259

London Consequences is a 1972 group novel written by twenty writers published for the Festivals of London that year.

Margaret Drabble and B. S. Johnson conceived and edited the novel. The editors wrote the first and last chapters together, gave the other novelists a brief outline of the two main characters. Each author would write his or her chapter, then pass the accumulating manuscript onto the next author.

The interior chapters are by Rayner Heppenstall, Eva Figes, Gillian Freeman, Jane Gaskell, Wilson Harris, Olivia Manning, Adrian Mitchell, Paul Ableman, John Bowen, Melvyn Bragg, Vincent Brome, Peter Buckman, Alan Burns, Barry Cole, Julian Mitchell, Andrea Newman, Piers Paul Read and Stefan Themerson.

The book did not identify authors' individual contributions. The G.L.A.A. (Greater London Arts Association) offered a prize of £100 to anyone who correctly identified each chapter's author. Entry forms appeared at the back of the book. Readers had until 11 August 1972 to enter.

John Moynihan writing in The Sunday Telegraph, thought it a "harmless giggle". John Whitley writing in The Sunday Times said the novel had little merit, citing the poorly drawn characters whom he described as "cloudy menaces" and the book's numerous continuity errors. Jim Hunter in The Listener complained that the chapters seem very alike, and little of the prose distinct but felt that "the book has its moments" and that "the amicable co-operation of even three, let alone 20 novelists has rarity value." Valerie Grosvenor Myer writing for the Tribune complained that "ultimately such eccentricity and wilfulness break up the book. It also seems mean of the editors not to tell us what did happen to the character called Twomey, except that Anthony did not fulfil his vow to kill him."
