= Ergodic literature =

Literary genre

B. S. Johnson's novel The Unfortunates was printed in 27 separate unbound sections: the opening chapter called "First", the final chapter called "Last", and the other 25 to be read in any order.

Ergodic literature (/ərˈɡɑːdɪk/ ər-GOD-ick) is a mode of textual organization in which nontrivial effort is required for the reader to traverse the text, beyond ordinary eye movement or turning pages. Espen J. Aarseth appropriated the term from physics, deriving it from the Greek ergon (“work”) and hodos (“path”). He introduced the term within his broader concept of cybertext, which he presents not as a literary genre but as a perspective on textual machines that compute or permute outputs. In Aarseth’s framing, the cybertextual process includes a semiotic sequence produced through the user’s material actions, which conventional notions of “reading” do not fully capture. Although frequently compared to “nonlinearity” in physics, Aarseth treats such nonlinearity in hypertext as a topological, graph-theoretic property of nodes and links rather than a concept imported from physics.

== Concept ==
Aarseth's book contains the most commonly cited definition of ergodic literature:

In ergodic literature, nontrivial effort is required to allow the reader to traverse the text. If ergodic literature is to make sense as a concept, there must also be nonergodic literature, where the effort to traverse the text is trivial, with no extranoematic responsibilities placed on the reader except (for example) eye movement and the periodic or arbitrary turning of pages.

His aim in providing this definition is to offer a radical break from earlier theories of hypertext, which he says fall trap to 'an essentialist idea of "the computer medium" as a singular structure of well-defined properties,' and thus remain blind both to the plurality of types of media that a computer can support, and of the forms that text can take outside of a digital medium. Additionally, without free text search, many hypertext works end not less, but more linear than the conventional codex, in stark contrast with the technoutopist visions of hypertext and its capabilities. To this end, he aims to develop a model of literature organised not around the medium in which the work is contained, but instead around the manner in which the text itself functions and interacts with its reader.

Aarseth divides the text into three core constituent elements: the medium itself, the human operator, and the strings of signs which make up the text itself. The last of these he divides into two distinct categories: textons – strings of signs as they appear (or are encoded) in the text itself – and scriptons – strings of signs as they appear to the reader or user of the text. From there, Aarseth develops a typology of possible media positions for texts, organised around seven axes:

- Dynamics: Whether scriptons are constant and unchanging (Static), or variable: in which case scriptons may vary in content or number, whilst textons remain fixed (Intratextonic Dynamics, or IDT), or both scriptons and textons may vary (Textonic Dynamics, or TDT). As an example, he gives Michael Joyce's afternoon, a story, which is a hypertext, but its scriptons and textons both remain fixed, and contrasts it with Multi-User Dungeons, where neither the number, nor amount of scriptons and textons can be known
- Determinability: Whether a scripton's adjacent scriptons are always the same (Determinable), or whether they may change (Indeterminable). As an example, he gives adventure games, where sometimes the same action will always produce the same result, making it predictable, or it may involve some degree of randomness, such as a dice throw, making it unpredictable
- Transiency: Whether the text requires direct input from the reader for the text to change (Intransient), or if it may change on its own (Transient). As an example, he gives William Gibson's Agrippa (A Book of the Dead), where the text scrolls past the screen at its own pace, regardless of user input.
- Perspective: Whether the text requires its reader to play a strategic, intradiegetic role within the text (Personal), or not (Impersonal). (Note: These also later appear as Permanent and Impermanent) As an example, he gives Italo Calvino's If on a winter's night a traveler, where he says there is little for the reader to actually, strategically, do, in contrast with Multi-User Dungeons, where the player is (at least partially) responsible for their character
- Access: Whether scriptons are readily available to the user (Random) or not (Controlled). As an example, he gives the typical codex, which may be opened to any page, at any time, in contrast with hypertexts such as Stuart Moulthrop's Victory Garden, where accessing a specific passage may require from the reader to follow a specific path through other passages.
- Linking: Whether the text is organised by links that are available to the reader at any point (Explicit), or only under certain circumstances (Conditional), or whether there are no links in the text whatsoever (None). As an example, he again gives Michael Joyce's afternoon, where certain parts of the text are accessible only once the reader has visited specific other passages.
- User functions: Whether the reader only interprets the text (Interpretative) - a function present in all texts - or if they also decide what paths to take (Explorative), chooses or creates scriptons during a specific reading session (Configurative), or adds permanently to the body of the text (Textonic). As an example of a text that the reader explores he gives Julio Cortázar's Rayuela, for a text that the reader configures he gives Raymond Queneau's A Hundred Thousand Billion Poems, and for a text the reader permanently alters, he gives Allen S. Firstenberg's Unending Addventure.

Variable	Possible value
Dynamics	Static, Intratextonic Dynamics, Textonic Dynamics
Determinability	Determinable, Indeterminable
Transiency	Transient, Intransient
Perspective	Personal, Impersonal
Access	Random, Controlled
Linking	Explicit, Conditional, None
User function	Interpretative, Explorative, Configurative, Textonic

These seven variables are capable of producing a total of 576 unique media positions (3 x 2 x 2 x 2 x 2 x 3 x 4), of which conventional hypertext and literature represent only a small part. Among these, Aarseth defines an 'ergodic text' as any one which requires at least one of the three other user functions beyond mere interpretation. Thus, both paper-based and electronic texts can be ergodic: "The ergodic work of art is one that in a material sense includes the rules for its own use, a work that has certain requirements built in that automatically distinguishes between successful and unsuccessful users."

== Cybertext ==
Cybertext is Aarseth’s perspective on dynamic textual machines; he proposes reserving ‘cybertext’ for texts where ‘calculation’ produces scriptons. Thus, works of hypertext fiction of the simple node and link variety may be ergodic literature but not cybertext: it is the presence of conditional links and computation that shift them toward being cybertext. A chat bot such as ELIZA is considered a cybertext because when the reader types in a sentence, the text-machine actually calculates directly based on the user's input to generate a textual response. Likewise, the I Ching is cited as an example of cybertext: though it is the reader that carries out the calculation, the rules to generate responses are clearly embedded in the text itself.

It has been argued that these distinctions are not entirely clear and scholars still debate the fine points of the definitions. The concepts of cybertext and ergodic literature were of seminal importance to new media studies, in particular literary approaches to digital texts and to game studies.

Cybertext has also been suggested as a tool to enhance learner engagement and motivation in language education.

== Examples ==
Aarseth gives two major lists of examples of ergodic literature throughout the work – first in the opening chapter, then in the third, where a possible typology is discussed. The major examples listed throughout the work include:

Examples given by Espen Aarseth
Title	Creator	Format or Description
(No specific example or location identified)	Ancient Egyptians	Stone wall inscriptions of the temples in ancient Egypt that are connected two-dimensionally (on one wall) or three dimensionally (from wall to wall or room to room).
afternoon: a story	Michael Joyce	Published by Eastgate Systems, it is one of the earliest examples of hypertext literature, along with Victory Garden.
Agrippa	William Gibson	A 300-line semi-autobiographical novel. It exists in two forms, either on a 3.5" floppy disk, where the text scrolls by automatically, and encrypts itself once it has passed, or as an artist's book, of which the pages have been treated with photosensitive chemicals, such that the first exposure to light would effect gradual fading.
Book Unbound	John Cayley	A "holographic sentence generator that merges and mutates other texts, inviting readers to feed their favorite results back into the system."
Calligrammes	Guillaume Apollinaire	A collection of poems, which "fork out on the page" – the "words and sentences on [the] page are spread out in many directions," and invite "linking/jumping.", with no clear right sequence. It can be considered alternatively an example of concrete or visual poetry.
Cent mille milliards de poèmes	Raymond Queneau	A set of ten poems, printed on card with each line on a separate strip. As all ten sonnets have not just the same rhyme scheme but the same rhyme sounds, any lines from a sonnet can be combined with any from the nine others, allowing for 10^{14} (= 100,000,000,000,000) different poems.
Colossal Cave Adventure	William Crowther & Don Woods	A text-based adventure game, where the player interacts with locations and objects via simple word prompts, interpreted by the game's natural language input system.
Composition No. 1, Roman	Marc Saporta	The historically first "book in a box," consisting of a bundle of pages that can be shuffled and read in any order. Conceptually similar to B. S. Johnson's (1969) The Unfortunates, which consists of 27 unbound "sections" of varying lengths, with only the first and last specified as such.
ELIZA	Joseph Weizenbaum	An early natural language processing computer program created from 1964 to 1966 at MIT.
Falcon 5: The Dying Sun	Mark Smith & Jamie Thomson	A game book, similar to The Money Spider. Differs from it in that it adds dice-rolling as a mechanic, and thus a degree of indeterminacy.
Hopscotch	Julio Cortázar	A stream-of-consciousness novel which can be read either linearly, or according to an alternative chapter order listed at the start.
I Am Awake in the Place Where Women Die	Jenny Holzer	A temporary LED installation, wherein a "linear electronic text [...] endlessly repeats its short, painful messages."
The I Ching	China, as old as 900 BCE	A divination text in which bundles of yarrow stalks are arranged to form numbers.
The Money Spider	Robin Waterfield & Wilfred Davies	A "typical gamebook in which the reader must solve a puzzle by choosing the right path through the many fragments of the text."
MUD1	Richard Bartle & Roy Trubshaw	The first multi-user dungeon, a text-based multiplayer real-time virtual world.
Night of January 16th	Ayn Rand	A play about a trial, where "members of the audience are picked to be the jury," with two possible endings depending on their verdict.
Norisbo	Randi Strand	An artist's book, which "folds from all four sides, so the reader reads a unique sequence folded by the last reader and then folds the pages to leave a unique combination for the next reader."
Pale Fire	Vladimir Nabokov	A novel consisting of a 999-line unfinished poem in four cantos, written by John Shade, and a pseudo-academic analysis by his neighbour and university colleague Charles Kinbote, where the majority of the book's "plot" is situated, and an index. Aarseth notes that it "can be read either unicursally, straight through, or multicursally, jumping between the comments and the poem."
Racter	William Chamberlain and Thomas Etter	An artificial intelligence program that generates English language prose at random.
Tale-spin	James Meehan	A program which generates "simple animal fables of the Æsop type," with varying success.
TinyMUD	James Aspnes	A further example of a multi-user dungeon. Builds upon MUD1's model in that it allows for user-generated dungeons.
Twin Kingdom Valley	Trevor Hall	An example of a "more flexible adventure game," building upon Colossal Cave Adventure's model.
Unending Addventure	Allen S. Firstenberg	An example of hypertext collaborative fiction, wherein users can add notes at the ends of the branches.
Victory Garden	Stuart Moulthrop	One of the earliest examples of hypertext literature, along with Michael Joyce's Afternoon.

There are still further examples worth considering, however, especially ones that came out after Cybertext's release, or were simply too obscure or glanced over at the time of release. Such include:

Further examples of ergodic fiction
Title	Creator	Format or description
999: Nine Hours, Nine Persons, Nine Doors	Kotaru Uchikoshi	A Japanese adventure game on the Nintendo DS which is told through two simultaneous perspectives, each displayed on a separate screen.
Avalovara	Osman Lins	A stream-of-consciousness novel containing riddles, puzzles, anagrams, palindromes, and a considerable amount of word play.
Bottom's Dream	Arno Schmidt	A novel, published in folio format with 1,334 pages, told mostly in three shifting columns, presenting the text in the form of notes, collages, and typewritten pages.
Building Stories	Chris Ware	A graphic novel presented as fourteen separate works packaged within a box. Each component work has a distinct presentation—including a mock Little Golden Book, newspaper, broadsheet and flip book—and can be read in any order.
Choose Your Own Adventure	Edward Packard	A set of children's novels written in the second person in which the reader makes choices throughout, leading to a number of different possible endings.
Dictionary of the Khazars	Milorad Pavić	Three cross-referenced mini-encyclopedias, sometimes contradicting each other, each compiled from the sources of one of the major Abrahamic religions. Additionally, a ballet adaptation was staged at Madlenianum Opera and Theatre.
Landscape Painted with Tea	Milorad Pavić	Described as "A novel for crossword fans."
House of Leaves	Mark Z. Danielewski	A novel with a very unusual layout, containing an abundance of footnotes, faux quotes, rotated, flipped, and mirrored text, read in either direction, along with an extensive section of only loosely related Addenda. Presented as a story about a manuscript about a movie about a house that is larger on the inside than the outside.
Life: A User's Manual	Georges Perec	A “series of novels” that can be read both linearly and non-linearly by navigating through an index of characters and stories, which Perec thought of as hypertext links.
Six Sex Scenes	Adrienne Eisen	Hypertext fiction that allows the reader to choose storylines throughout.
S.	J. J. Abrams and Doug Dorst	Composed of the novel Ship of Theseus (by the fictional V. M. Straka), hand-written notes filling the book's margins, and supplementary material loosely inserted between the pages.
The Griffin and Sabine Trilogy	Nick Bantock	Three stories, told through a series of letters and postcards between the two main characters. Every page features a postcard or a letter enclosed in an envelope.
XX	Rian Hughes	A science fiction novel told in part through ephemera such as declassified documents, artworks, graphics, and a novel within the novel.

== See also ==
- Aleatoric art
- Cybertext
- Digital poetry
- Electronic literature
- Fighting Fantasy
- Interactive fiction
- Rhizome
- Encyclopedic novel
