= Debut novel =

First full-length work of fiction by an author

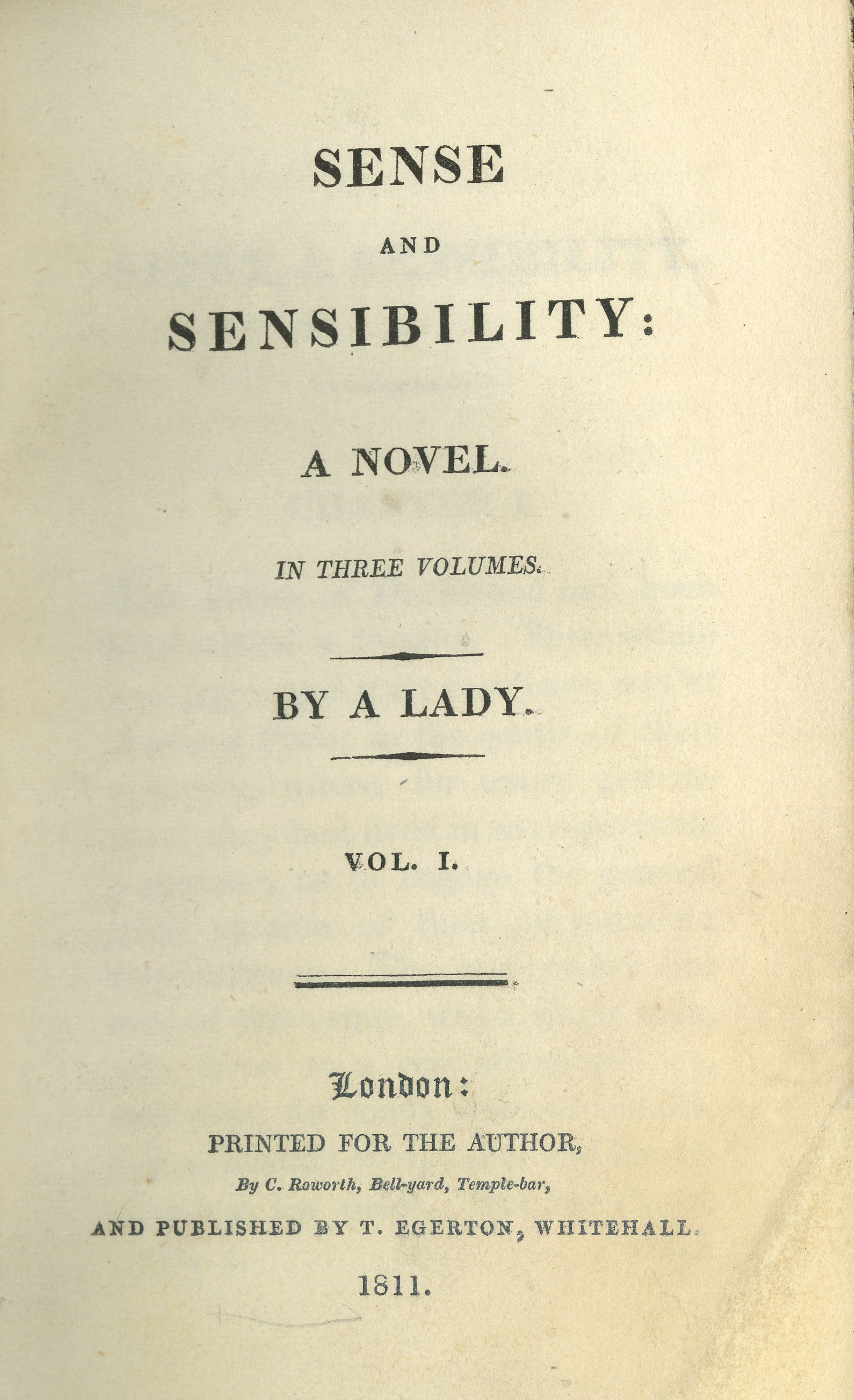
The title page of Sense and Sensibility, Jane Austen's debut novel published in 1811

A debut novel is the first novel a novelist publishes. Debut novels are often the author's first opportunity to make an impact on the publishing industry, and thus the success or failure of a debut novel can affect the ability of the author to publish in the future. First-time novelists without a previous published reputation, such as publication in nonfiction, magazines, or literary journals, typically struggle to find a publisher.

Sometimes new novelists will self-publish their debut novels, because publishing houses will not risk the capital needed to market books by an unknown author to the public. Most publishers purchase rights to novels, especially debut novels, through literary agents, who screen client work before sending it to publishers. These hurdles to publishing reflect both publishers' limits in resources for reviewing and publishing unknown works, and that readers typically buy more books from established authors with a reputation than from first-time writers. For this reason, literary communities have created awards that help acknowledge exceptional debut novels.

== Publishing and recognition ==
In contemporary British and American publishing markets, most authors receive only a small monetary advance before publication of their debut novel; in the rare exceptions when a large print run and high volume of sales are anticipated, the advance can be larger. For an example of an unusually high advance: in 2013, the highly anticipated City on Fire by Garth Risk Hallberg captured the attention of ten publishers who started a bidding war that ended with Knopf buying the rights to the book for $2 million. The book's film production rights were purchased soon after by producer Scott Rudin.

For similar reasons that advances are frequently not very large—novels frequently do not sell well until the author gains a literary reputation. There are exceptions, however; YouTuber Zoella published her debut novel Girl Online in November 2014, and the book sold 78,109 copies in Britain in its first week. The novel saw huge sales because she already had an established audience, and publishers were willing to run a large print run. By comparison, bestselling Fifty Shades of Grey sold 14,814 copies in its first week, or later popular novels, like Harry Potter and the Philosopher's Stone, only receive small initial print runs. Debut novels that do well will be reprinted as sales increase due to word of mouth popularity of the novels—publishers do not often run large marketing campaigns for debut novelists.

There are numerous literary prizes for debut novels often associated with genre or nationality. These prizes are in recognition of the difficulties faced by debut novelists and bring attention to deserving works and authors. Some of the more prestigious awards around the world include the American Hemingway Foundation/PEN Award, the French Prix Goncourt du Premier Roman, the British Guardian First Book Award, the German Aspekte-Literaturpreis and the Japanese Noma Literary Prize. The New York Times commentator Leslie Jamison described the big, and often very public, "to do" about debut novels and novelists created by these book awards, as associated with the excitement of finding authors and writers without established legacies. In the same piece for the Times, Ayana Mathis describes the debut novel as "a piece of the writer's soul in a way that subsequent books can't ever be", because the novel is necessarily a work of passion and a product of all of their life before that moment.

== Literary characteristics ==
Often an author's first novel will not be as complex stylistically or thematically as subsequent works and often will not feature the author's typical literary characteristics. Huffington Post's Dave Astor attributes these to two forces: first that authors are still learning their own unique style and audiences are more willing to read works from unknown authors if they resemble more conventional styles of literature. As examples, Astor points to J. R. R. Tolkien's The Hobbit (1937), Margaret Atwood's The Edible Woman (1969) and Charles Dickens' The Posthumous Papers of the Pickwick Club (1837), all of which lack the complexity or stylistic characteristics which audiences praise in the authors' later work. There are however some debut novels that are regarded as the author's masterpiece, for example Gustave Flaubert's Madame Bovary, Joseph Heller's Catch 22, Günter Grass' The Tin Drum and Chinua Achebe's Things Fall Apart. Conversely, there are other novelists who came to hate their debut novels. For example, B. S. Johnson came to hate his debut Travelling People (1963) so much that he demanded it to be withdrawn from sale, which it was, and thus Travelling People remains out of print.

Sometimes, instead of writing novels to begin their career, some authors will start with short stories, which can be easier to publish and allow authors to get started in writing fiction.

== Etymology ==
According to the Oxford English Dictionary, the earliest attested usage of "first novel" is from 1876. However, the term is much older, with instances going back to at least 1800. The Oxford English Dictionary does not have an entry for "debut novel". The earliest usage of "debut novel" in the Google Books database is 1930 (as of 2011). The term appears in newspapers as early as 1922, in a review of Marjorie L.C. Pickthall's novel The Bridge. The Google Books Ngram Viewer shows the term becoming more widely used after about 1980, gaining in popularity since.

== See also ==
- Debut (disambiguation)
- List of first novels by language
