= Katarzyna Bazarnik =

Polish academic, writer and translator (born 1970)

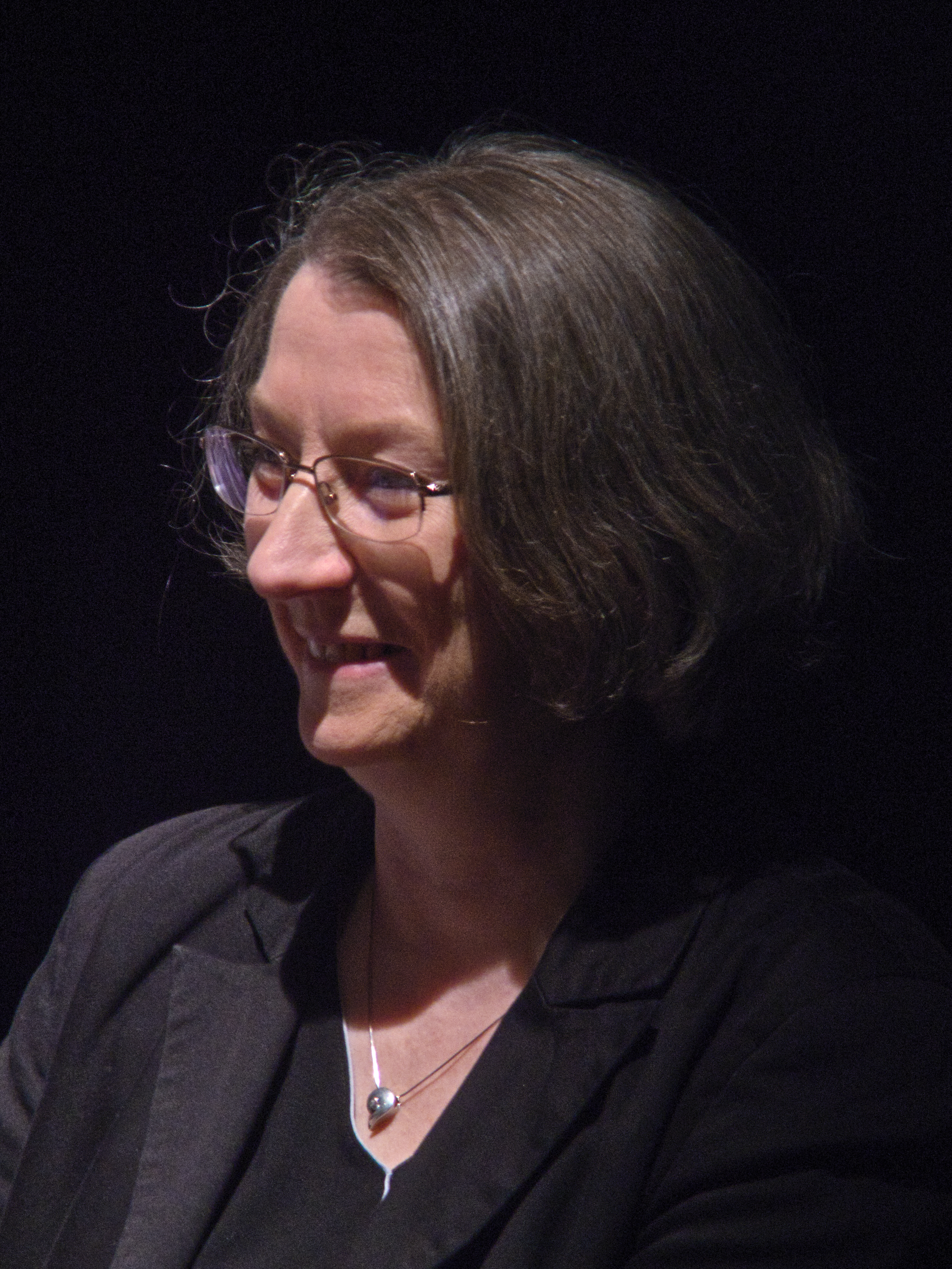
- Born: 1970 (age 55–56); Poland
- Education: Jagiellonian University
- Occupations: University lecturer and literature historian
- Known for: Studies of the works of James Joyce

Katarzyna Bazarnik (born 1970) is a Polish historian of English literature, a translator, a university lecturer, and the co-creator of the theory of liberature, which closely relates the text and the material form of a publication.

== Education ==
Bazarnik completed an MA at the Institute of English Philology (IFA), Jagiellonian University, Kraków and in 2007 she obtained a PhD from the same university, with a thesis entitled Some Aspects of Spatiality of the Literary Work as Exemplified by James Joyce's Giacomo Joyce, Ulysses and Finnegans Wake (with a reference to L. Sterne, Mallarmé, B. S. Johnson and R. Federman).

== Career ==
Bazarnik obtained a habilitation degree from the Jagiellonian University in 2017 with a thesis entitled Liberature: A Book-bound Genre. She became an assistant professor at the Department of Comparative Literary and Cultural Studies at the Institute of English Philology (IFA) of the university in 1995, lecturing on the history of British literature, on multimodal literature, on translation studies and the methodology of literary studies. She also runs translation workshops as part of the UNESCO Chair in Translation Studies and Intercultural Communication. She has been a guest lecturer at foreign universities, including the University of Tokyo and the School of the Art Institute of Chicago. Her interests include the work of James Joyce, iconicity in literature, and avant-garde and experimental literature.

Together with Zenon Fajfer, Bazarnik created the concept of liberature, and is the co-editor of the Liberatura series of the Korporacja Ha!art publishing house, which has published over 20 titles, including by Mallarmé, Joyce, Perec and Queneau. In 2002, she edited the first literary criticism publication on the subject of liberature, entitled From Joyce to Liberature. She has also edited or co-edited other monographs and issues of journals, including issues of Literatura na Świecie (Literature in the World) devoted to Joyce and Johnson. She initiated and then organized six editions of the Bloomsday in Kraków conference (1997–2008), the title being a reference to Leopald Bloom, a character in Joyce's Ulysses. Bazarnik also translates from Polish into English and from English into Polish, and has translated the novels Nieczęścini (The Unfortunates - 2008) and Przeżona w normie (House Mother Normal - 2010) by B.S. Johnson, and the poetry and essays of Zenon Fajfer.

Bazarnik is the author of Liberature. A Book-bound Genre (Monograph - Kraków, 2016) and Joyce and Liberature (Monograph - Prague, 2012). She has published in James Joyce Quarterly, Spanish Joyce Papers, Teksty Drugie, and Przekładaniec, which is published by the UNESCO Chair in Translation Studies. She is a member of the editorial board of the publishing series Topographies of (post) modernity and European Joyce Studies. She is a member of the International James Joyce Foundation, the Polish Aesthetic Society, and the European Association of Modernist Studies. Among other activities she writes articles for the magazine Tygodnik Powszechny.

== Recognition ==
In 2014–2015, one hundred of the benches in Planty Park in Kraków had a name plate added to them of an author who either came from or in some cases was closely connected with Kraków, such as Thomas Keneally, author of Schindler's Ark. This was one of the activities associated with the Kraków UNESCO City of Literature celebrations of 2014. Bazarnik was one of those recognised.
