= Albert Angelo =

1964 novel

- First edition (UK)
- Author: B. S. Johnson
- Language: English
- Publisher: Constable (UK)
- Publication date: 1964
- Publication place: United Kingdom
- Media type: Print
- Pages: 180
- ISBN: 0-8112-1002-2
- OCLC: 14214230
- Dewey Decimal: 823/.914 19
- LC Class: PR6060.O3 A79 1987
- Preceded by: Travelling People
- Followed by: Trawl

Albert Angelo may also refer to the former mayor of Vancouver, Washington.

Albert Angelo is the second novel written by the experimental novelist B. S. Johnson (1933–1973). Published in 1964 by Constable (and reissued in 1987 by New Directions), the book achieved fame for having holes cut in several pages as a narrative technique. It is written in an unusual and pioneering style, frequently changing from first-person narrative to third-person commentary, and often descending into stream-of-consciousness interior monologue. Like many of Johnson's novels it is an autobiographical work.

== Plot ==
Albert Angelo tells the story of Albert Angelo, a substitute teacher who longs to be a professional architect. He has had to resort to teaching to make ends meet, as he is not an accomplished enough architect to make a living from it. Living in a flat in Angel in London, he finds himself teaching in increasingly tougher schools, and part of the story concerns his struggle with difficult pupils in class, mirroring Albert's struggle with life in general. Through the reproduction of some of their essays, we also learn the pupils' opinions of Albert and their attitudes towards him, which are often hilarious.

Albert devotes much thought to his ex-girlfriend Jenny, with whom he is still very much in love and who he feels betrayed him. He reminisces about her frequently. His friend Terry, whom he accompanies to late-night cafes, was also 'betrayed' by a woman, and their friendship is built upon this common experience.

The story is at times humorous and at others incredibly serious. As is usual in a Johnson novel sexuality is openly and frankly discussed. Johnson's writing technique allows us to view Albert's character from many angles.

== Style ==
As mentioned, the book is written in an unorthodox style. This is typical of Johnson, though it is not uniform throughout his books. Albert Angelo is divided into several parts, ending with a coda, normally used in musical score. Two of the pages have holes cut into them, allowing the reader to glimpse events further ahead in the story. The book closes with an intervention by the author, explaining what he was trying to achieve in writing it. In this section is Johnson's unshakeable belief recorded - Telling stories is telling lies.

== References in other works ==
Johnson referenced Albert Angelo in his later novel House Mother Normal, with the character Ivy Nicholls reading a section of Albert Angelo, before putting the book down and saying it is boring.

In Brian Castro's 1994 novel Drift, the character B.S. (Byron Shelly) Johnson, has his copy of Albert Angelo confiscated by the Australian Customs authorities because, "there were holes cut in the pages and they wanted to view the excisions".

== Reception ==
Reviews for Albert Angelo were mixed. Val Mulkerns wrote in The Irish Times that the book was a masterpiece, while Adrian Mitchell in The Sunday Times said of Johnson in his review: "Value this man. His writing sings. He walks like a fiery elephant." David Lodge gave a mixed review in The Spectator, commenting that the moment Johnson's breaks away from the novel to comment on lying was a pyrrhic victory, because it diminished the imagined life of the book. Negative reviews focused on the novel's experimental nature including the pages holes, with the Daily Mail calling it a, "pretentious kaleidoscope", and The Times saying the experiments were not radical at first appearance.
