= Rayner Heppenstall =

British novelist, poet, diarist, and a BBC radio producer

John Rayner Heppenstall (27 July 1911 in Lockwood, Huddersfield, Yorkshire, England – 23 May 1981 in Deal, Kent, England) was a British novelist, poet, diarist, and a BBC radio producer.

== Early life ==
Heppenstall was a student at the University of Leeds, where he read English and Modern Languages, graduating in 1932. He had a brief teaching career, in Dagenham.

Coming to London in 1934, he rapidly made initial contacts in the literary world. A short study, Middleton Murry: A Study in Excellent Normality (1934) brought him for a time into John Middleton Murry's Adelphi commune at "The Oaks", where in 1935 he worked as a cook. Also in 1935 he met Dylan Thomas, sent to meet him by Sir Richard Rees of the Adelphi magazine. In short order he became a Catholic convert, and married Margaret Edwards in 1937 (with whom he later had two children: Adam Heppenstall and Lindy Heppenstall, later Foord). In the mid-1930s he was influenced by Eric Gill.

He was a friend of George Orwell, whom he first encountered in 1935 through Thomas and Rees, and later wrote about him in his memoir Four Absentees. Heppenstall, Orwell and the Irish poet Michael Sayers shared a flat in Lawford Road, Camden. Heppenstall once came home drunk and noisy, and when Orwell emerged from his bedroom and asked him to pipe down, Heppenstall took a swing at him. Orwell then beat him up with a shooting-stick, and the following morning told him to move out. Friendship was restored, but after Orwell's death, Heppenstall wrote an account of the incident called The Shooting-Stick.

During World War II he was in the British Army, but with a Pay Corps posting at Reading, close enough to remain in touch with literary Fitzrovia. He was also posted to Northern Ireland.

In an interview for the book World Authors, Heppenstall stated he had once been a left-winger, but since the 1960s had become politically more conservative. Heppenstall also said he was especially opposed to "Progressivism" and World Government. He listed Jorge Luis Borges, Samuel Beckett, and Vladimir Nabokov as the writers he most admired.

== Novelist ==
Heppenstall's first novel, The Blaze of Noon (1939), was critically acclaimed. Much later, in 1967, it received an Arts Council award. He was Francophile in literary terms, and his non-fiction writing reflects his tastes.

Critical attention has linked him to the French nouveau roman, in fact as an anticipator, or as a writer of the "anti-novel". Several critics (including, according to his diaries, Hélène Cixous) have named Heppenstall in this connection. He is sometimes therefore grouped with Alain Robbe-Grillet, or associated with other British experimentalists: Anthony Burgess, Alan Burns, Angela Carter, B. S. Johnson, Ann Quin, Stefan Themerson and Eva Figes. The Connecting Door (1962) is singled out as being influenced by the nouveau roman.

He was certainly influenced by Raymond Roussel, whose Impressions of Africa he translated. Later novels include The Shearers, Two Moons and The Pier. He also wrote a short study of the French Catholic writer Léon Bloy (Cambridge: Bowes & Bowes, 1953).

Heppenstall's book The Fourfold Tradition was praised by V. S. Pritchett, who expressed admiration for "its pleasure in literature".

== Radio work ==
From 1945 to 1965, he worked for the British Broadcasting Corporation on radio as a feature writer and producer, and then for two further years as a drama producer. His contemporaries in the department included the fellow poets Louis MacNeice, W R Rodgers and Terence Tiller. One of his early adaptations was of Orwell's Animal Farm in 1947.

In his journals, Heppenstall mentions problems he had with Evelyn Waugh regarding a radio broadcast in the 1940s. Waugh apparently felt that Heppenstall purposely insulted him when he was sent to take him to the broadcast.

== Later life ==
Later in life Heppenstall moved to the town of Deal. During this time he took a strong dislike to his working-class neighbours and began deliberately lighting bonfires in order to antagonise them. Heppenstall's final novel, The Pier, depicts a writer resembling himself murdering a similar family living next door to him.

After his death, Heppenstall's journals were published: they caused some controversy by revealing his hostility to fellow writers such as Alan Sillitoe, and also expressing prejudices against black people, Irish people, Arabs and lesbians.

== Works ==
Criticism

- Middleton Murry: A Study in Excellent Normality (Jonathan Cape, 1934)
- Apology for Dancing (Faber & Faber, 1936)
- The Double Image: Mutations of Christian Mythology in the Work of Four French Catholic Writers of To-Day and Yesterday (Secker & Warburg 1947)
- Léon Bloy (Bowes & Bowes, Cambridge, 1954)
- Architecture of Truth: The Cistercian Abbey of Le Thoronnet in Provence (Thames, 1957)
- The Fourfold Tradition: Notes on the French and English Literatures, with Some Ethnological and Historical Asides (Barrie & Rockliff, 1962)
- Raymond Roussel: A Critical Study (Calder & Boyars, 1966)

Crime History

- A Little Pattern of French Crime (Hamish Hamilton, 1969)
- French Crime in the Romantic Age (Hamish Hamilton, 1970)
- Bluebeard and After: Three Decades of Murder in France (Peter Owen,1972)
- The Sex War and Others: Survey of Recent Murder, Principally in France (Peter Owen, 1973)
- Reflections on the Newgate Calendar (W.H. Allen, 1975)
- Tales from the Newgate Calendar (Constable, 1981)

Novels

- The Blaze of Noon (Secker & Warburg, 1939)
- Saturnine (Secker & Warburg, 1943), revised as The Greater Infortune (Peter Owen, 1960)
- The Lesser Infortune (Jonathan Cape, 1953)
- The Woodshed (Barrie & Rockliff, 1962)
- The Connecting Door (Barrie & Rockliff, 1962)
- The Shearers (Hamish Hamilton, 1969)
- London Consequences (The Greater London Arts Association, 1972) with Margaret Drabble, B. S. Johnson, Eva Figes, Gillian Freeman, Jane Gaskell, Wilson Harris, Olivia Manning, Adrian Mitchell, Paul Ableman, John Bowen, Melvyn Bragg, Vincent Brome, Peter Buckman, Alan Burns, Barry Cole, Julian Mitchell, Andrea Newman, Piers Paul Read and Stefan Themerson.
- Two Moons (Allison & Busby, 1977)
- The Pier (Allison & Busby, 1986)

Poetry

- Patina (Literary Guild, 1932)
- First Poems (Heinemann, 1935)
- Sebastian: New Poetry (Dent, 1937)
- Proems (The Fortune Press, 1938) with Lawrence Durrell, Ruthven Todd, Patrick Evans, Edgar Foxall, and Oswell Blakeston
- Blind Men's Flowers Are Green (Secker & Warburg, 1940)
- Poems, 1933–1945 (Secker & Warburg, 1946)

Memoirs

- My Bit of Dylan Thomas (1957)
- Four Absentees: Dylan Thomas, George Orwell, Eric Gill, J. Middleton Murry (Barrie & Rockliff, 1960)
- The Intellectual Part: An Autobiography (Barrie & Rockliff, 1963)
- Portrait of the Artist as a Professional Man (Peter Owen, 1969)

Miscellaneous

- Imaginary Conversations: Eight Radio Scripts (as editor) (Secker & Warburg, 1948)
- Three Tales of Hamlet (Gollancz, 1950) with Michael Innes
- The Master Eccentric: The Journals of Rayner Heppenstall, 1969–1981, ed. Jonathan Goodman (Allison & Busby, 1986)

Translations from the French

- Atala and Rene (François-René de Chateaubriand, Oxford University Press, 1963).
- Impressions of Africa (with Lindy Foord) (Raymond Roussel, Calder & Boyars, 1969).
- A Harlot High and Low (Honoré de Balzac, Penguin, 1970).
- When Justice Falters (René Floriot, Harrap, 1972).

== Critical studies ==
- Buckell, G. J. (2007). Heppenstall – A Critical Study (DAP). ISBN 1-56478-471-1 : ISBN 978-1-56478-471-1
- Mack, Maynard & Ian Gregor ed. (1968). Imagined Worlds: Essays on Some English Novels and Novelists in Honour of John Butt.
