= Cybertext =

Type of interactive fiction

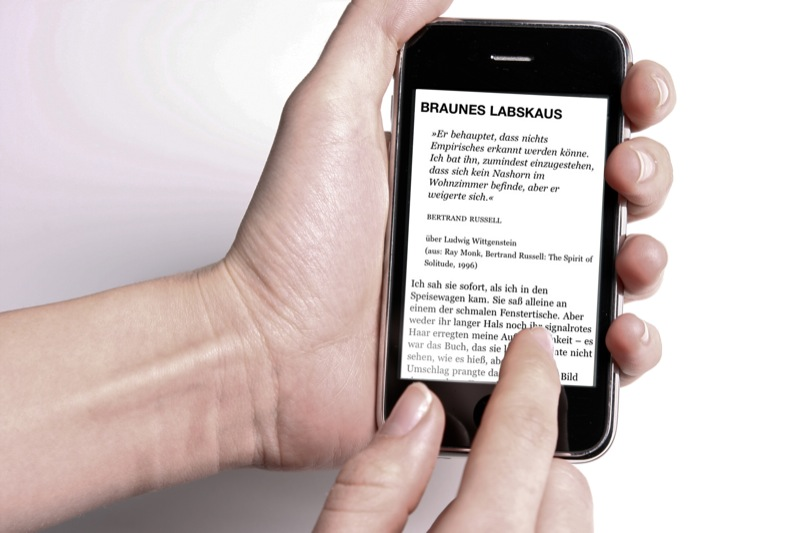
- Stylistic origins: Cybernetics, Post-structuralist literary theory
- Formats: Digital

Related topics
- Hypertext, interactive fiction, ergodic literature, electronic literature

Cybertext as defined by Espen Aarseth in 1997 is a type of ergodic literature where the user traverses the text by doing nontrivial work.

== Definition ==
Cybertexts are pieces of literature where the medium matters. Each user obtains a different outcome based on the choices they make. According to Aarseth, "information is here understood as a string of signs, which may (but does not have to) make sense to a given observer." Cybertexts may be equated to the transition between a linear piece of literature, such as a novel, and a game. In a novel, the reader has no choice, the plot and the characters are all chosen by the author: there is no 'user', just a 'reader'. This is important because it entails that the person working their way through the novel is not an active participant.

Cybertext is based on the idea that getting to the message is just as important as the message itself. In order to obtain the message, work on the part of the user is required. This may also be referred to as nontrivial work on the part of the user. This means that the reader does not merely interpret the text but performs actions such as active choice and decision-making through navigation options. There is also a feedback loop between the reader and the text.

== Application ==
The concept of cybertext offers a way to expand the reach of literary studies to include phenomena that are perceived today as foreign or marginal. In Aarseth's work, cybertext denotes the general set of text machines which, operated by readers, yield different texts for reading. For example, in Raymond Queneau's book Hundred Thousand Billion Poems, each reader will encounter not just poems arranged in a different order, but different poems depending on the precise way in which they turn the sections of page.

Cybertext can also be used as a broader alternative for hypertext, particularly as it critiques the critical responses to the latter. Aarseth, together with literary scholars such as N. Katherine Hayles, maintains that cybertext cannot be applied according to the conventional author-text-message paradigms since it is a computational engine.

== Background ==
The term cybertext is derived from cyber- in the word cybernetics, which was coined by Norbert Wiener in his book Cybernetics, or Control and Communication in the Animal and the Machine (1948), which in turn comes from the Greek word kybernetes – helmsman. The prefix is then merged with the word "text", which is identified as a distinctive structure for producing and consuming verbal meaning in post-structuralist literary theory.

Although Aarseth's use of the term has been the most influential, he was not the first to use it. The neologism cybertext appeared several times in the late 1980s and early 1990s. It was the name of a software company in the mid-1980s, and was used by speculative fiction poetry author Bruce Boston as the title of a book he published in 1992, which contained science-fictional poetry.

Cybertext is part of what scholars called generational shifts involving literature on digital media. The first phase was hypertext, which transitioned to hypermedia during the mid-1990s. These developments coincided with the invention of the first graphic browser called Mosaic and the popularization of the world wide web. Cybertext came after hypermedia amid the move toward the focus on software code, particularly its considerable ability to control the reception process without reducing interactivity.

The fundamental idea in the development of the theory of cybernetics is the concept of feedback: a portion of information produced by the system that is taken, total or partially, as input. Cybernetics is the science that studies control and regulation in systems in which there exists flow and feedback of information. Though first used by science fiction poet Bruce Boston, the term cybertext was brought to the literary world's attention by Espen Aarseth in 1997.

Aarseth's concept of cybertext focuses on the organization of the text in order to analyze the influence of the medium as an integral part of the literary dynamic. According to Aarseth, cybertext is not a genre in itself; in order to classify traditions, literary genres and aesthetic value, we should inspect texts at a much more local level. He also maintained that traditional literary theory and interpretation are not main features in cybertext since it focuses on the textual medium (textonomy) and the study of textual meaning (textology).

== Examples ==
An example of a cybertext is Twelve Blue by Michael Joyce. It is a web-based text that includes navigation modes characterized by fluid and multiple sense of structures of electronic textuality such as colored threads that play different "bars" and blue-script text that returns to images of rivers and water. Depending on what link you choose or what portion of the diagram on the side you pick you will be transferred to a different portion of the text. So in the end, you do not really finish reading the entire story or 'novel' you go through random pages and try piecing the story together yourself. You may never really 'finish' the story. But, because it is a cybertext the 'finishing' of the story is not as important as its impact on the reader, or on the conveyance.

Another example is Stir Fry Texts, by Jim Andrews, which is a cybertext where there are many layers of text, and as you move your mouse over the words, the layers beneath them are 'dug' through. Mary Flanagan's The House is another example of a cybertext where one might assume a description of the piece as follows: It is an unruly text, the words don't listen, you are not supreme. You are guided through the piece. This is a cybertext with minimal control. You watch as something unfolds before you, "a crumbling mania", you must be able to go with the flow, to read texts upside down, to piece together a reflection of words, to be okay with texts half read disappearing or moving so far away so continuously that you can not make out those very important words.

== See also ==
- Digital rhetoric
- Electronic literature
- Gamebook
- Hypermedia
- Hypertext
- Interactive fiction
- New media
- Video games as an art form
