= XX (novel) =

2020 novel by Rian Hughes

- Author: Rian Hughes
- Language: English
- Genre: Science fiction
- Publisher: The Overlook Press
- Publication date: 2020

XX is a 2020 science fiction novel by writer Rian Hughes.

== Design and publication ==
Hughes created a new typeface for the novel. Adapting the novel for e-readers was difficult, and Hughes considers the printed book to be the way the novel "should be read". Due to its use of graphic elements, artwork, a novel within the novel, asemic writing, and epistolary techniques, it can be considered a work of ergodic literature.

== Reception ==
Neville Hawcock, writing for The Financial Times, praised the graphic elements of the book as an "enjoyable variation" from typical novels. Lydia Fletcher, in a review published by The Library Journal, criticized the novel as occasionally "difficult to follow" in part due to the "mixed-media" portions.
