= Christie Malry's Own Double-Entry =

1973 novel by B. S. Johnson

- First edition
- Author: B. S. Johnson
- Language: English
- Genre: Dystopian metafiction
- Publisher: Collins
- Publication date: 1973
- Publication place: United Kingdom
- Media type: Print
- Pages: 188
- ISBN: 0-00-221131-9
- Preceded by: House Mother Normal
- Followed by: See the Old Lady Decently

Christie Malry's Own Double-Entry (1973) is the penultimate novel by the late British avant-garde novelist B. S. Johnson and the last to be published in his lifetime, Johnson committing suicide in the year of the book's release. It is the metafictional account of a disaffected young man, Christie Malry, who applies the principles of double-entry bookkeeping to his own life, "crediting" himself against society in an increasingly violent manner for perceived "debits", with his methods ranging from acts of vandalism to terrorist attacks leading to the deaths of thousands of innocent people.

Considered to be the most accessible of Johnson's works, the novel received praise at the time of publication from writers such as Auberon Waugh, with critics commenting positively on the humour in the work, although some attacked the experimental nature of the novel. In 2000, the novel was adaptated into a film of the same name.

== Plot summary ==
Christie Malry, being a "simple man", above all longs for sex and money. In order to understand how money works, he takes a job in a London bank. This leads him to enroll in a bookkeeping course, where he learns the double-entry system. Bored by his bank job, he quits and starts work at Tapper's, a sweet factory.

One day, he has the idea to apply the double-entry system to his life. Every aggravation Malry suffers from society he reclaims in revenge to balance his life. For example, when he is forced to walk along a particular stretch of pavement due to a office block's placement, he scratches a line down the building's facing using a coin. Having established this system, and growing progressively angrier at society, Malry graduates from minor acts of personal revenge to large-scale terrorism: bombing hoaxes, an actual bombing, and poisoning West London's drinking water resulting in the deaths of 20,000 people. Shortly before he manages to bomb the House of Commons, he dies of cancer.

== Development and style ==
The book is partly inspired by Johnson's own time as an accounts clerk, working in a factory in 1952, aged 19. The novel was written in a short period of time, much of it on 31 January 1972, and finished it on 30 March the same year, a day before the publisher's deadline.

The book used multiple stylistic techniques. At various points, Johnson quotes from Summa de arithmetica by Luca Pacioli, the first work to discuss the system of double-entry bookkeeping. There are also multiple "reckonings", in which are printed the records of Christie's debits and credits in the form of pages written up from an account book, with the final page of the novel having the words: "Account Closed" scrawled on the bottom.

Johnson scatters many metafictional elements throughout the novel, often for comedic effect. Characters frequently mention in passing that they know that they are works of fiction, such as when Malry's mother says to him that she has been his mother for the purposes of the novel, or when Christie complains that the novel contains too many exclamation marks. Johnson also frequently emphasizes the written, and thereby invented, nature of the text. Johnson introduces himself as a character near the novel's end, apologising to Christie that he won't be able to continue the book much further—to which Christie replies that people don't equate length with importance, and that readers no longer want long novels, with the novel being just over 20,000 words long.

== Reception ==
Reviews of the novel were mainly positive. Reviewing the novel for The Spectator, Auberon Waugh called it a masterpiece and said: "if I had any say in the matter it would probably win the Nobel Prize for Literature." Several reviews praised the humour in the work, including Robert Nye, who also like the fact that Christie Malry's Own Double-Entry was less experimental than Johnson's previous works. However, Anthony Thwaite's review said Johnson had not much imagination and call the experimentation, "stylistic tomfoolery".

== Publication history ==
Christie Malry's Own Double-Entry was first published in 1973 by William Collins, Sons and Co. Ltd. It has since then been reprinted twice by New Directions, in 1985 and 2009 respectively. A 2001 edition with a foreword by John Lanchester was published by Picador.

== Adaptations ==
In January 1973, the book was adapted for radio and broadcast on BBC Radio London. This version was read by the author with dramatised sections. In 2000, a film adaptation was produced. It was directed by Paul Tickell, written by Simon Bent and starred Nick Moran as Christie.
