= The Unfortunates =

1969 book by B. S. Johnson

- First UK edition
- Author: B. S. Johnson
- Language: English
- Genre: Ergodic
- Publisher: Panther Books (UK); Secker & Warburg (US)
- Publication date: 1969
- Publication place: United Kingdom
- Media type: Paperback (27 unbound sections in laminated box)
- Pages: 244 pages
- OCLC: 40588291
- Preceded by: Trawl
- Followed by: House Mother Normal

The Unfortunates is the fourth novel by English author B. S. Johnson. An experimental "book in a box", it was published in 1969 by Panther Books, then reissued in 1999 by Picador and in 2008 by New Directions. It features 27 unbound sections, with a first and last chapter specified, but the 25 sections between them, ranging from a single paragraph to 12 pages in length, being designed to be read in any order, giving a total of 15.5 septillion possible combinations that the story can be read in. Christopher Fowler described it as "a fairly straightforward meditation on death and friendship, told through memories." Jonathan Coe described it as "one of the lost masterpieces of the sixties".

BBC producer Lorna Pegram employed Johnson to talk about this creation for the TV series Release after she was lobbied by Carmen Callil of Panther Books. With barely any negotiation the interview was ready months before the book was ready for publication. The film included Johnson holding a mock-up of the book that was not at all similar to the final publication.

Johnson said of the book "I did not think then, and do not think now, that this solved the problem completely… But I continue to believe that my solution was nearer; and even if it was only marginally nearer, then it was still a better solution to the problem of conveying the mind's randomness than the imposed order of a bound book."

== Plot ==
A football writer is sent to a city (identifiable through landmarks as Nottingham) on an assignment. Upon arrival by train, he is struck by the memory that this is where his deceased friend Tony, who had died of cancer, lived and worked. Over the course of the novel the narrator travels around the city, during which he reports on the match, but at the same time is haunted by past memories of Tony. The novel concludes with the narrator taking the train back home, contemplating both Tony's death and his own mortality.

== Development ==
In order to supplement his income, Johnson worked as a football writer for The Observer, and was tasked to write a report on a Nottingham Forest match. Nottingham is where Johnson's friend Tony Tillinghast had worked and lived, with Johnson's debut novel Travelling People being dedicated to him. Tillinghast was diagnosed with cancer in 1962, dying in 1964. The Unfortunates was an truthful attempt to recreate the randomness of memory, hence the move to publish the chapters loose and not to have a fixed order, arguing that the order of memory is not fixed.

Publisher Secker & Warburg originally reacted negatively to the idea of an unbound book, partly due to the expense. Johnson also made demands for a particular kind of paper to be used in the production of the chapters.

== Releases and adaptations ==
A 1999 re-release of The Unfortunates, displaying the separate chapters

Originally published in 1969 by Panther Books, The Unfortunates was re-released by Picador in 1999 with an introduction by Jonathan Coe. In 1969 and as part of the BBC Two arts magazine programme Release, Johnson presented and directed a feature segment about The Unfortunates, detailing the origins of the novel and how it came to be structured. This was later released on DVD as part of the BFI Flipside collection You're Human Like the Rest of Them.

When The Unfortunates was first published in Hungary, it was released as a normal paperback. To allow the reader to still read the book in a random order, symbols were printed above each of the twenty-five random sections, with the same symbols reprinted on the back page of the book. The reader was then instructed to cut out the symbols or trace them, put them into a receptacle, and draw them out to create a random order.

In 2010, The Unfortunates was adapted for BBC Radio 3, with Martin Freeman playing the role of the sportswriter who in the broadcast is named Bryan, this being Johnson's first name. This adaptation was recorded in 17 parts, which were randomised in a draw that took place on The Verb. The programme was then posted on the BBC website, where listeners could make their own random order to listen to.

The book was also the subject of an episode of BBC Radio 4 documentary series The Exploding Library in 2023, in which comedian Rob Auton presented the show in a random order similar to the novel.

== Reception ==
When The Unfortunates was originally published, reviews were negative. Fellow writer Christine Brooke-Rose was unimpressed, saying it was not as original as the cut-up works of William S. Burroughs, and Robert Nye thought that The Unfortunates was pointless, self-indulgent, and the Johnson was, "not boring enough to be 'real', yet he is too dull to be true." Other criticisms commented on the lack of solidity in the way that Johnson had reported his characters, while Stephen Wall of The Observer called The Unfortunates, "a modest, sincere, small-scale novel", and another critic described the boxed work as a "Kleenex novel". Some critics disliked the random ordering of the work, with one review in the Ottawa Citizen writing that the wrapper that held the loose chapters, "is ALL that holds this novel together."

More recent reviews have reevaluated The Unfortunates. Reviews of the 1999 Picador praised Johnson's writing, commenting that the emotion that he wrote with made the random nature of the story work, and also comparing him to other writers at the time, with one review in The Daily Telegraph suggesting that when Johnson wrote about misery, in comparison Philip Larkin and Samuel Beckett "seem wry and quipping." Following the 2008 New Directions version of the novel, some critics referenced Johnson's eventual suicide in 1973 at the age of 40, with a review in The New York Times suggesting it is hard to imagine a novel that is less solipsistic, although other reviews claim that in the context of Johnson's death, that reading The Unfortunates is akin to reading a diagram on his suicide.
