= Trawl =

1966 novel by B. S. Johnson

- First edition (UK)
- Author: B. S. Johnson
- Cover artist: John Holden
- Language: English
- Publisher: Secker & Warburg (UK)
- Publication date: 1966
- Publication place: United Kingdom
- Media type: Print
- Pages: 183
- Preceded by: Albert Angelo
- Followed by: The Unfortunates

Trawl is the third novel by the experimental British novelist B. S. Johnson. Published by Secker & Warburg in 1966, the book is an autobiographical novel based on a trip Johnson took on a fishing trawler to the Barents Sea. Although reviews of the novel were mixed, in 1967 Trawl was joint winner of the Somerset Maugham Award.

== Summary ==
Despite being a novel, Trawl has been described as containing no plot or invented characters. It follows an unnamed narrator who takes a three-week journey on a fishing trawler to the Barents Sea. As well as observing the activities carried out by the crew, the narrator also looks back at his life, metaphorically "trawling" through his past. This includes recounting past love interests and his childhood as a wartime evacuee.

== Style ==
Trawl was described by Johnson as: "all interior monologue". The book features an absence of paragraphs, while the length of lines in the book is shortened, thus the book is printed in a long, narrow format. In an interview with The Guardian, Johnson said that he did not want readers to know that the rhythms of the book's language imitated the rhythms of the sea. When Johnson presented the work to Fredric Warburg of publishers Secker & Warburg, Warburg believed the work to be an autobiography rather than a novel. Johnson denied this, saying in response: "It is a novel, I insisted and could prove; what it is not is fiction."

The novel is noted for differing from many of Johnson's other works in that it features a positive ending: when the trawler arrives home, the narrator finds his current love interest, Ginnie, at the dock waiting for him. Ginnie is based on his then-partner and future wife Virginia Kimpton.

== Reception ==
Reviews for Trawl were mixed. Positively, The Guardian said that Johnson had grown up as a writer, The Times found the book, "both entertaining and artistically satisfying", and the Evening Standard praised Johnson's courage as a narrator. However, Montague Haltrecht in The Sunday Times commented that Johnson was a sentimentalist, Hilary Corke complained about the symbolism of the narrator trawling through their memories, and Martin Seymour-Smith wrote of Trawl: "the effect is one of Dorothy Richardson writing about merchant seamen."

In 1967, Trawl was joint winner of the Somerset Maugham Award, given to writers to enrich their work through experience of foreign countries. He co-won with Andrew Sinclair's The Better Half. Johnson won £500, on condition that the money should be spent on foreign travel.
