= Kate Figes =

English author and journalist (1957–2019)

- Born: Catherine-Jane Figes; 6 November 1957; London, England
- Died: 7 December 2019 (aged 62); London, England
- Education: Polytechnic of Central London
- Occupations: Author and journalist
- Spouse: Christoph Wyld (m. 1988)
- Children: 2
- Mother: Eva Figes
- Relatives: Orlando Figes (brother)

Kate Figes (/ˈfɪdʒɪz/ born Catherine-Jane Figes; 6 November 1957 – 7 December 2019) was an English author and journalist.

== Early life and background ==
Kate Figes was born in London, England, on 6 November 1957, the daughter of the feminist writer Eva (née Unger) and John George Figes. Her younger brother is the historian Orlando Figes. Their mother's Jewish family fled from Nazi Germany in 1939. Figes's parents divorced when she was aged five, both relating different accounts as to what happened. She left home at 17 after a row with her mother; the relationship between the two women remained difficult for many years.

After graduating in Russian and Arabic from the Polytechnic of Central London (now the University of Westminster), Figes became a sales representative for Pandora Press, the feminist imprint of publishers Routledge Kegan Paul, and later worked as a publicist and editor for the same firm. Figes followed her mother's profession, although she only became a full-time writer in her thirties. "It's not easy to believe you can when your own mother is one too," she once said. Following a part-time job as fiction editor for Cosmopolitan magazine, leading to newspaper commissions and her appointment in 1996 as the books editor of You magazine (a supplement of The Mail on Sunday), a post she retained for the rest of her career. She wrote seven books of non-fiction and two novels.

== Books ==
According to Melissa Benn, Figes wrote "several books on women's most profound experiences". Her first book, Because of Her Sex: The Myth of Equality for Women in Britain, was published in 1994, and concerned sexism. Life after Birth (1998) drew on interviews with several hundred interviews with new mothers and was a best-seller in the UK. Rebecca Abrams wrote in The Independent on Sunday, "combines personal opinion, anecdote, medical information, social history and (a few) statistics." A decade later, Abrams described it as "taboo-busting" in laying "bare the secret ambivalence and confusion at the heart of many women's experience of motherhood."

Figes' non-fiction book on adolescence, The Terrible Teens (2002), was followed by two novels, What About Me? The diaries and emails of a menopausal mother and her teenage daughter and its sequel What About Me Too? The Big Fat Bitch Book For Girls (2008) is partly a self-help book for teenagers, while Our Cheating Hearts – Love and Loyalty, Lust and Lies (2013) considered infidelity.

For Couples: the Truth (2010), Figes interviewed 120 men and women in a relationship, both heterosexual and gay, about all aspects of their lives. Cassandra Jardine in The Daily Telegraph wrote that it is "a book that lingers in the mind, with a fundamentally upbeat message".

== Personal life ==
Figes married Christopher Wyld in 1988; Wyld was then a foreign news editor for the BBC. The couple had two daughters. Figes said in 2010 that her experience of her parents' divorce left its mark on the early years of her own marriage: "I still spent the first 10 years of our marriage wondering when my husband was going to leave me!" Following the birth of her first daughter, Figes suffered from postnatal depression for a few years; diagnosis was somewhat delayed.

With her brother, Figes received naturalisation papers from the German embassy in June 2017. Figes wrote: "We were holding out our hands in forgiveness to shake those of younger Germans, who also bore no responsibility for the past at a time of growing nationalism and suspicion of 'the other' in Europe. All of this had contributed to the making of the decision".

=== Terminal illness ===
Figes was diagnosed in September 2016 with triple negative breast cancer, which had metastasised. She wrote about her terminal illness in On Smaller Dogs and Larger Life Questions, published by Virago in 2018.

Figes died from cancer at home in London on 7 December 2019.
