= Dare (comic strip) =

British comic book story

- Dan Dare on the cover of Dare #2, April 1992; art by Rian Hughes.
- Publisher: Fleetway Publications
- Publication date: July 1990 – March 1991
- Genre: Political
- Title(s): Revolver #1-7; July 1990 to January 1991; Crisis #56; March 1991
- Main character(s): Dan Dare; Albert Digby; Gloria Munday; The Mekon

Creative team
- Writer: Grant Morrison
- Artist: Rian Hughes
- Letterer: Ellie De Ville
- Editor: Peter Hogan
- Dare: ISBN 9781853862113

"Dare", also known as Dare - The Controversial Memoir of Dan Dare, Pilot of the Future (Note: The title given on the cover of the 1992 Fantagraphics reprint, and often used in discourse to avoid confusion with other Dan Dare strips) is a British dystopian science fiction comic story, starring the character Dan Dare. Written by Grant Morrison and illustrated by Rian Hughes, the story originally began publication in the Fleetway Publications anthology Revolver in July 1990 before concluding in Crisis. The story is a revisionist take on Dare, using the character to satirise the government of Margaret Thatcher, and the treatment of the character's creator Frank Hampson.

== Creation ==
Dan Dare had been created by artist Frank Hampson as the lead character for Marcus Morris' boys comic Eagle in 1950 and been an instant success. Dare become a cultural icon in Britain, with the character's name even becoming cultural shorthand for derring-do in space. However, in 1959 financial problems saw the Eagle sold to Odhams Press, who fired Hampson and his acclaimed art studio to cut costs. By the time Odhams were absorbed into IPC Magazines in 1969 and Eagle was merged with Lion, the strip had been running reprints for two years. Since then the character - or more precisely a descendent thereof who had the same name, personality and plot function - had been resurrected with mixed results in 2000 AD before a more enduring revival in IPC's new version of Eagle from 1982. The latter was still running in 1990 (having returned to telling new adventures of the original version of the character the previous year) as the character's 40th anniversary approached; however, while moderately successful in the contracting British children's comics of the time, neither the new Eagle or its Dan Dare strip made the same cultural impact as their illustrious forebears.

Instead the industry's growth seemed to be in adult-orientated comics. IPC's successor Fleetway Publications attempted to gain a foothold in this market with the fortnightly anthology Crisis, which was enough of a success for editor Steve MacManus to be given the go ahead for a monthly companion title, Revolver. MacManus selected Peter Hogan as editor, and the pair began to search for stories. Grant Morrison approached them with an idea for a revisionist Dare story he had conceived in 1987; the promotional opportunity of both having a Dan Dare strip to tie into the 40th anniversary and having Morrison - who had recently broken through in the American market with Arkham Asylum and Animal Man for DC Comics - was not lost on the Revolver team.

Revolver designer Rian Hughes would provide art; at the time he had limited experience on comic strips, though his work on the 1989 one-shot The Science Service had received critical acclaim, and was suggested to Morrison by MacManus. Morrison was inspired to revisit the character due to the original Eagle strips having shown an optimistic "great imperial dream" of the 1990s and the contrast with reality. Hughes largely ignored the 2000 AD or new Eagle versions of the strip in his research, feeling they were only related to the original by "the name and the eyebrow".

Initially it might seems that what we're trying to do is take the piss out of that whole fifties ideal of the imperial strong-jawed hero, but in actual fact there is a core of that which is actually quite worthy and quite honourable, and we also want to show that as well, and to show how that can easily be perverted.

— Grant Morrison, interviewed by Nigel Curson, Daring Future, Speakeasy #109 (May 1990)

Morrison also drew parallels between the role of Dare in the story and the treatment of Hampson and other creators involved in work for hire in the comic industry. Hughes insisted that he had "complete respect" for the original and that the pair were not intending to "trash anything for cheap effect". Hughes felt imitating Hampson's style would be "almost impossible to pull off" and applied his own "less is more" approach to the character. Morrison would note that the story began as a parable about Thatcherism and it was only towards the end of the writing process that the realisation it could also function as a comment on the treatment of the likes of Hampson crystallised.

== Publishing history ==
"Dare" was originally printed in 9-page chapters in Revolver. However, the comic was cancelled after only seven issues saw print due to poor sales in January 1991. After a recap of the story in Crisis #55, the final episode was printed in #56. Hughes was forced to modify one panel in the final part when one of the implements protruding from the Mekon's chair was deemed too phallic; Hughes would comment "I think what actually goes on during that scene is still pretty obscure".

The complete story was collected later in 1991, carrying the brand of Fleetway's short-lived European comic label Xpresso. Despite Dare's relative obscurity in America, Morrison's standing saw the story reprinted for the American market as a four-issue limited series, published by Fantagraphics' Monster Comics imprint. The story has also been included in Yesterday's Tomorrows, a compendium of Hughes' comic work.

== Plot summary ==
Colonel Dan Dare has been prematurely retired from Space Force after sustaining a leg injury in the Threshold Conflict. Having to walk with a cane, he lives a solitary life making an unenthusiastic attempt at writing his memoirs. Dare is shaken out of his isolation when he receives news that his former colleague Professor Jocelyn Peabody has committed suicide. At her funeral, Dare approaches his one-time best friend Albert Digby, who dismisses him with curt anger. His former commander Sir Hubert Guest introduces Dare to Prime Minister Gloria Munday; her Unity Party have been in power in Britain for 10 years, during which the police have gained greater power. She wants to use him in her promotional material as she seeks another 5-year term and, wanting to feel useful and needing the money, he agrees. After donning his uniform and attending a photo call outside the Space Fleet Headquarters, decommissioned following the privatisation of Space Fleet.

He finds himself taken to Preston for a meeting with Digby; on the way Dan is shocked at the privation-ridden north, with lengthy food queues and drug-dealing Treens living in ghettos. Digby believes Peabody was murdered, as the scientist is one of several to have died while working in the new 'Pie in the Sky' Project, which is behind the miracle superfood marketed as Manna. Digby is running a subversive cell, and retains considerable personal enmity to Dare over the Threshold Conflict. This saw Space Force sent in after a Treen takeover of the Venus-orbiting Threshold space station. On arrival the Treens were found to be unarmed protestors, including children; Dan followed orders and opened fire where Digby didn't.

Dare returns to London and undertakes a second photoshoot, this time with his old ship Anastasia, taken out of mothballs from the Science Museum for the occasion. Afterwards, he and Digby visit Peabody's home, where they discover a video recording of her tearfully confessing to the true nature of Manna - Munday has been collaborating with the Treen regime on Venus, supplying humans in return for a solution to Earth's food shortages. The humans are then converted into biomass, from which the Treens have created what she describes as a self-replicating computer. Manna is the sexual secretions of the biomass, and takes over the body of anyone that consumes it. As a result, despite being pregnant Peabody resolves to kill herself before it can happen to her and her child. The house has been under police surveillance and is stormed by armed troops. Reasoning that Dan is more likely to be listened to, Digby sacrifices himself holding them off while Dare gets the tape to safety and heads to London. However, the BBC refuse to broadcast the tape, surreptitiously wiping it. Defeated, Dare returns home and burns his memoirs, leaving only his diary of recent events, and sends a codeword to Digby's allies in Preston. Guest arranges for him to be collected and taken before Munday - and her new ally, the Mekon.

The Mekon explains the true purpose of Manna - it is loaded with aphrodisiacs, and will drive humanity into a frenzy copulation to produce Manna addicted slaves he will control. Dare is aghast, but seemingly unable to do anything as he is humiliatingly violated by his old enemy, forced to thank the Mekon and turned out onto the streets as another Munday landslide is announced. Dare's diary has been recovered by the police; the Mekon and his allies pore over it - only to realise Dare had secreted a fission device on board the Anastasia earlier. Before they can react, the bomb detonates.

The page goes white before pulling out to reveal an empty drawing board surrounded by Eagle and Dan Dare paraphernalia, and a quote from Frank Hampson.

"Although I often wished he would, Dan Dare refuses to lie down and die. But that's just what I intend to do now."

— Frank Hampson, 1981.

== Collected editions ==
Title	ISBN	Publisher	Release date	Contents
Dare	9781853862113	Xpresso Books	1991	Material from Revolver #1-7 and Crisis #56
Yesterday's Tomorrows: Rian Hughes' Collected Comics	9780861661541	Knockabout Comics	12 July 2007	Material from Revolver #1-7 and Crisis #56
Yesterday's Tomorrows: Rian Hughes' Collected Comics	9781607063148	Image Comics	1 February 2011	Material from Revolver #1-7 and Crisis #56

== Reception ==
"Dare" has been called controversial and has received mixed reviews. Comics writer Garth Ennis, who wrote the 2007 Virgin Comics Dan Dare mini-series, would reflect "I thought what Grant did was a bit of a hatchet job", recalling Morrison's glee at writing the scene where Dare was "shagged by the Mekon". However, writing for Slings and Arrows, Graham Johnstone was positive about the story, feeling it was successful as "an individual take on [Dan Dare], but it's genuinely rooted in and respectful of the original. This is credibly Hampson's characters responding to a changed world around them – indeed a betrayal of their basic values." Analysing the story for Medium, Reed Beebe concluded that even though Thatcher's regime was in the past the story, "with its critique of political corruption and its commentary on creators' rights within the comics industry", remained relevant in the present day. D. Emerson Eddy of Comics Beat reviewed the story in a 2023 'Classic Comics Compendium' column, praising it as "a reinterpretation of a classic figure through a dystopian lens", particularly crediting Hughes' artwork and the lettering of Ellie De Ville. Screen Rant included it in a list of '10 Best Grant Morrison Comics You Haven't Read (But Need To)', noting the contrasting approach to the portrayal of an aging Batman in The Dark Knight Returns.

Tom Shapira of The Comics Journal was less positive in a 2020 overview of Dan Dare, calling it "quite bad", despite feeling the story's targets were worthy ones - noting "Morrison's raw anger at Conservative politics felt far stronger here than in any other thing he's ever written". Shapira criticised the implied anal rape of Dare by the Mekon, calling it "probably the most Mark Millar-esq thing Grant Morrison has ever written (and that includes the stuff he actually co-wrote with Millar)", and feeling "It keeps explaining why the old comics are bad, and you should feel bad for enjoying them. It's one-note and one-dimensional in both character and presentation."
