= See the Old Lady Decently =

1975 novel by B. S. Johnson

- First edition (UK)
- Author: B. S. Johnson
- Cover artist: Patrick McCreeth (jacket design); Mark Gerson (photographer)
- Language: English
- Publisher: Hutchinson (UK)
- Publication date: 1975
- Publication place: United Kingdom
- Media type: Print
- Pages: 139
- ISBN: 0-09-123730-0
- Preceded by: Christie Malry's Own Double-Entry

See the Old Lady Decently is the seventh and final novel by the experimental British novelist B. S. Johnson. The book was published posthumously by Hutchinson in 1975, Johnson having committed suicide in 1973. It was intended to be the first part of a trilogy of novels about his late mother, but the other two volumes were never written.

== Plot and planned trilogy ==
See the Old Lady Decently was planned to be the first part of The Matrix Trilogy, whose later volumes were to be entitled Buried Although and Amongst Those Left Are You. The titles were intended to read a full sentence on their spines: "See the old lady decently buried although amongst those left are you."

The novels were originally intended to be an observation of the life of Johnson's mother Emily. See the Old Lady Decently covers the period of Emily's birth in 1908 to Johnson own birth in 1933. Buried Although was to continue from this point to the end of the Second World War, and Amongst Those Left Are You would have covered Emily's death in 1971. Johnson later expanded the work to cover three interlinked themes: the death of his mother, the decay of the mother country, and the renewal aspect of motherhood.

== Style ==
The novel is split into multiple coded sections rather than chapters. These include poems and letters, including one letter printed in the book reporting on the death of Emily's father in the First World War. Aside from these are the following sections:"

- Year(Age): The first number is the year the book was currently at, and the second number in brackets is Emily's age at the time. For example, 16(8) is set in 1916, when Emily is aged eight.
- V: Virrels, a fictional, horrible chef whom Emily works for.
- GB: Sections written in the manner of a guided tour detailing the growth and decay of Britain. No names are mentioned in these sections to make the work feel more general.
- BB: Similar in style to GB, but covering "Broader Britain" and the British Empire.
- N: Quotes from and references to psychologist Erich Neumann, author of The Great Mother.
- H: References to Field Marshal Douglas Haig, head of the army in the First World War, and a man whom Johnson hated.
- O: Moments of birth, including Johnson describing his own birth from the point of conception onwards.

== Publication ==
See the Old Lady Decently was published by Hutchinson in 1975 exactly as it was delivered by Johnson, despite the company's reservations about the work in the form it was presented. An introduction to the book was written by Michael Bakewell, who had directed Johnson's TV film Fat Man on a Beach. The book has not been reprinted since it was first released.

== Reception ==
Reviews for See the Old Lady Decently were mixed, with several critics and writers complaining about the experimental nature of the work, including Peter Ackroyd, Janice Elliott, Robert Nye and Victoria Glendinning, with last of whom said that reading the book, "is like being hit, repeatedly and all over, by grape-shot." However Elliott did also express enjoyment of the humour and tenderness in the work.

Critics outside of Britain were more positive, with American and Australian critics praising the novel's cleverness and humour. Others however commented on the frustration that the trilogy would never be completed, and some said while the book was moving it was also at times exasperating.
