= Philip Tew =

British academic

Philip Tew (born Enfield, Middlesex, England) is the author of works on the contemporary British novel. His first novel Afterlives was published in February 2019. A second fiction book, Fragmentary Lives: Three Novellas, was published in October 2019.

== Books ==
- The Contemporary British Novel, London: Continuum, 2007. Second Revised Edition. (ISBN 978-0-8264-7349-3).
