= Travelling People =

1963 novel by B. S. Johnson

- First edition (UK)
- Author: B. S. Johnson
- Language: English
- Publisher: Constable (UK)
- Publication date: 1963
- Publication place: United Kingdom
- Media type: Print
- Pages: 285
- Followed by: Albert Angelo

Travelling People is the debut novel by the experimental British novelist B. S. Johnson. Published by Constable in 1963, the book follows a man who is given a job working at a country club in North Wales, and deals with his relationships between his employer and fellow members of staff. The book is told in various styles, including first-person narrative, diary entries, and a film script. The novel is also notable for being withdrawn from publication on Johnson's request, due to his belief that written works should always be truthful, whilst Travelling People told lies.

== Plot ==
Travelling People tells the story of Henry Henry, a university graduate who is hitchhiking from London to Dublin via North Wales. He is picked up by Trevor Tuckerson, who runs a country club called the Stromboli Club in the fictional town of Aberfyllin, near Pwllheli, and offers him a job. Henry accepts and takes up the post after finishing his trip. His work consists of various odd jobs, including working behind a bar, and killing chickens.

During his time at the club, Henry becomes locked into a conflict between two groups: Trevor and his love interest Mira who works as a piano player, and both of whom only want to attract upper class clientele; and the more realistic club owner Maurice "Maurie" Bunde, waitress Gwendy, and cook Kim, who is also Maurie's lover. Henry eventually sides with Maurie's group.

As the novel progresses, Kim becomes more attracted to Henry. Maurie dies of a heart attack, liberating them in terms of their relationship, but the increasing conflict with Trevor and Mira eventually leads to Henry being fired. Kim too is fired after arriving late for work, and also because she and Henry invite Welsh locals to the club. The rest of the staff eventually leave the club as well, and Henry hitchhikes his way back to London.

== Style ==
The novel is told in various different styles. In the book's prelude, Johnson wrote that he objected to novel being told in only one way and that: "The style of each chapter should spring naturally from its subject matter." Among the styles adopted in the book include a letter, a newspaper report, a film script, and one chapter narrated from the point-of-view of Maurie, which includes a page printed entirely in black as he dies. This motif is one Johnson took from The Life and Opinions of Tristram Shandy, Gentleman by Laurence Sterne. Also, between the chapters are "interludes" which feature asides by Johnson and quotes from old books.

== Reception ==
Reviews of Travelling People were mixed. While some reviews praised the humour in his book, others complained about the experimental nature of the work, with Simon Raven's saying that the blacked-out pages representing Maurie's death, "represents Mr. Johnson at his pretentious worst." Zulfikar Ghose attacked the critics who considered Johnson's experimentation as gimmicks, saying the product of his work was one of intelligence. Anthony Burgess wrote positively of Travelling People writing it was original in the same way both Tristram Shandy and Ulysses also were.

Johnson submitted Travelling People and his poetry collection Selected Poems for consideration for the Eric Gregory Award. He was ranked joint third and won £100.

== Withdrawal ==
Despite Travelling People being well received when it was written, Johnson himself came to hate the work, due to it mixing truth and fiction. Due to his belief that: "Telling stories is telling lies", he eventually demanded it would be withdrawn from sale. While a paperback version from Corgi was released in 1964, the book eventually fell out of print.
