= Rian Hughes =

British graphic designer, illustrator, type designer, comics artist, and novelist

- Education: London College of Printing
- Known for: Illustrator, comics artist, cover artist, typographer, type designer, graphic designer, writer
- Notable work: Logo-a-gogo: Branding Pop Culture, Korero Press, 2018; Cult-ure: Ideas can be Dangerous, Carlton Books, 2015; XX: A Novel, Graphic, Picador, 2020; The Black Locomotive, Picador, 2021; Rayguns and Rocketships: Vintage Science Fiction Book Cover Art, Korero, 2018
- Website: devicefonts.co.uk

Rian Hughes is a British graphic designer, illustrator, type designer, comics artist and novelist.

== Overview ==
Hughes has written and drawn comics for 2000 AD, Vertigo CMYK and Batman: Black and White, and designed for DC Comics and Marvel. His designs and illustrations are published widely across the UK and US publishing, music, and advertising industries. His recent novels are XX and The Black Locomotive.

== Biography ==
=== Early career ===
Hughes graduated from London College of Printing and was employed at various advertising agencies where he worked for ID magazine, Smash Hits and Condé Nast. At the same time he was drawing his own comics, and got involved with the British small press comics scene of the time.

=== Comics involvement ===
Hughes' first graphic novel was The Science Service for Belgian publisher Magic Strip. This was followed by "Dare" for Fleetway’s Revolver, an “iconoclastic revamp of the ’50s comic hero Dan Dare” written by Grant Morrison. His strips from the "Galaxy’s Greatest" have been collected in Yesterday’s Tomorrows ("Dare", "Really and Truly" plus others) and Tales from Beyond Science, written by Mark Millar, John Smith and Alan McKenzie. More recently he wrote and drew a Batman: Black and White tale for DC Comics, contributed to Vertigo: Magenta, and was reunited with Morrison for two stories in Heavy Metal. As part of Morrison's The Multiversity, he designed the definitive Map of the Multiverse, DC Comics' overview of all their alternate realities.

=== Design and illustration ===
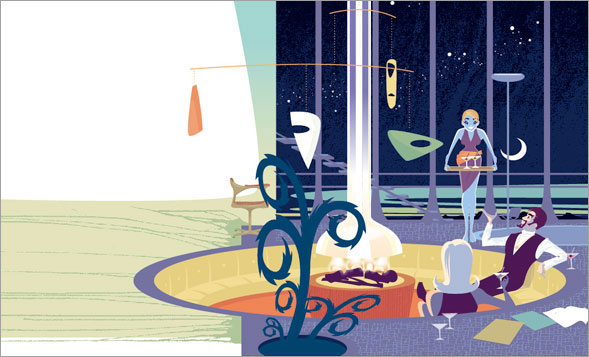
Example of Rian Hughes' illustration

Through the 1990s, aided by the introduction of the Macintosh, Hughes pushed his illustration work in a more stylised graphic direction. Adopting first Freehand than Adobe Illustrator, he used expanses of flat colour and texture in asymmetric and dynamic layouts, his characters became more elegant and exaggerated, and the type, generally custom designed for each illustration, became an integral part of his imagemaking process. This flat vector style has been dubbed "Sans Ligne" in reference to the European "Ligne Claire" school by artist Will Kane. Hughes considers his combination of design, illustration and typography to be a return to the working methods of the poster artists of the early 20th century, a period when artists like the Stenberg Brothers, Cassandre and Jean Carlu combined type, image and layout to achieve a dynamic, integrated whole.

Hughes' design for the music industry includes album artwork for Ultravox, The Madness by The Madness, and Oxford-based rock group The Winchell Riots. In 2007 he collaborated with ex Spice Girl Geri Halliwell on a series of six children's books, Ugenia Lavender. Further work included the animated on-board safety film for Virgin Airlines, a Eurostar poster campaign, and a collection for Swatch.

Roger Sabin, writing for Eye magazine, has called Hughes “one of the most successful and prolific designer/illustrators of the past 20 years”. A retrospective monograph collecting Hughes' early work, Art, Commercial, was published in 2001. His design work, including logos for Batman, the X-Men, Superman, The Avengers and James Bond, is collected in the Eisner-nominated book Logo-a-Gogo, published by Korero Press in 2018.

=== Type design ===
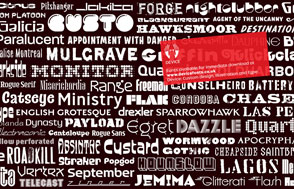
Selection of fonts designed by Hughes and released through his Device foundry

Hughes has described typography as "the particle physics of design". His early fonts were released as part of FontShop’s FontFont range. He set up his own foundry Device Fonts in 1993, through which he has released many designs including typefaces originally designed for clients as diverse as Mac User, 2000AD and The Teenage Mutant Ninja Turtles. Many of Hughes' fonts were created for specific design commissions, and their names reflect this. The chunky no-nonsense Judgement family was commissioned for 2000 AD, home of Judge Dredd. Metropol Noir, created specifically for the BDA Gold Award-winning 1996 MTV Europe Music Awards programme, is named after the Paris hotel Hughes was put up in for the event. One of his most widely-used fonts is Korolev, based on signs in a photograph of a 1937 Red Square Parade and named after Sergei Korolev, the lead Soviet rocket engineer throughout the Cold War.

Ten Year Itch, cataloguing the first ten years of Device Fonts, was published in 2005. Typodiscography covers all of Device Fonts' releases up to 2020.

=== Books and novels ===
Recent books by Hughes himself include Custom Lettering of the 20s and 30s (the third in a trilogy of Custom Lettering books), the wordless graphic novel I Am A Number (published by Top Shelf), Soho Dives, Soho Divas (Image Comics), his manifesto Cult-Ure: Ideas Can Be Dangerous (Fiell), and Rayguns and Rocketships: Vintage Science Fiction Book Cover Art (Korero, 2022).

In 2020, Hughes turned his hand to fiction and published XX, a graphic novel about a signal from space praised for its innovative use of fictitious articles, alphabets, a lost sci-fi novella, and other elements that draw on Hughes' experience as a designer and typographer. Hughes’ second novel, The Black Locomotive, contains similar graphic contrivances. Writing for The Times, Simon Ings named The Black Locomotive “one of the ten best sci-fi novels of 2021”.

== Bibliography ==
=== Comics ===
- The Inheritors (Modern Era Editions, 1988)
- The Science Service (script by John Freeman) (ACME/Eclipse, 1989, ISBN 0-913035-86-6)
- Dare (written by Grant Morrison, a revisionist sequel to Dan Dare)
  - "Dare" (Revolver #1–7, 1990)
  - "Dare" (in Crisis #55–56, 1991)
- Tales from Beyond Science (tpb, 88 pages, Image Comics, January 2012, ISBN 1-60706-471-5):
  - "The Men in Red" (with Mark Millar, in 2000 AD No. 774, 1992)
  - "The Music Man" (with Alan McKenzie, in 2000 AD No. 775, 1992)
  - "Long Distance Calls" (with Mark Millar, in 2000 AD No. 776, 1992)
  - "Agents of Mu-Mu" (with Alan McKenzie, in 2000 AD No. 777, 1992)
  - "The Eyes of Edwin Spendlove" (with John Smith, in 2000 AD No. 778, 1992)
  - "Secrets of the Organism" (with John Smith, in 2000 AD No. 779, 1992)
  - "The Secret Month Under the Stairs" (with Mark Millar, in 2000 AD Winter Special No. 4, 1992)
  - "The Man Who Created Space" (with Mark Millar, in 2000 AD Sci-Fi Special, 1994)
- "Really & Truly" (written by Grant Morrison, in 2000 AD #842–849, 1993)
- Robo-Hunter (with Peter Hogan):
  - "Slade Runner" (in 2000 AD 1994 Yearbook, 1993)
  - "Winnegan's Fake" (in 2000 AD #852–854, 1993)
  - "Metrobolis" (in 2000 AD #904–911, 1994)
  - "War of the Noses" (in 2000 AD #1023, 1996)

=== Collections ===
- Dare (a collection of the series scripted by Grant Morrison, published 1991)
- Yesterday's Tomorrows (a collection of work scripted by Grant Morrison, John Freeman, Tom De Haven and Chris Reynolds and consisting mainly of previously published work) (paperback, 280 pages, Image Comics, 2010)

=== Illustrations by ===
- Ugenia Lavender (written by Geri Halliwell), six volumes hardback/paperback, 68 pages, Macmillan, 2009)

=== Novels ===
- XX (Macmillan, 2020)
- The Black Locomotive (Pan Macmillan, 2021)

=== Nonfiction works written and/or edited by ===
- "Art, Commercial" (Die Gestalten Verlag, 2001)
- Ten Year Itch (Device, 2004)
- Really Good Logos, Explained (with Margo Chase, Ron Miriello, Alex White) (limpback, 250 pages, Rotovision, 2009)
- Lifestyle Illustration of the 60s (limpback, 520 pages, Fiell, 2010)
- Custom Lettering of the 40s and 50s (flexi, 580 pages, Fiell, 2010)
- Custom Lettering of the 60s and 70s (flexi, 580 pages, Fiell, 2010)
- On the Line (with Rick Wright) (hardback, 48 pages, Image Comics, 2010)
- Cult-ure: Ideas can be Dangerous (hardback, 320 pages, Fiell, 2010)
- Hardware: The Definitive SF Works of Chris Foss (hardback, 280 pages, Titan Books, 2011)
- Soho Dives, Soho Divas (Image Comics, 2013)
- Custom Lettering of the 20s and 30s (flexi, 576 pages, Korero Press, 2016)
- Logo-a-gogo: Branding Pop Culture (Korero Press, 2018)
- I Am a Number (Top Shelf, 2018)
- Typodiscography (Device Fonts type catalogue, 2019)
- Rayguns and Rocketships: Vintage Science Fiction Book Cover Art (Korero Press, 2022)
