= Alan Burns (author) =

English author (1929–2013)

- Born: Alan Burns; 29 December 1929; London
- Died: 23 December 2013 (aged 83); London, England
- Education: Merchant Taylors' School, Northwood; Middle Temple
- Occupations: Novelist, creative writing teacher, playwright
- Writing career
- Period: Late 1950s to mid-1980s
- Genre: Fiction
- Notable works: Europe After the Rain, Babel
- Movement: Modernism

Alan Burns (29 December 1929 – 23 December 2013) was an English author and one of the key figures in the short-lived group of experimental writers working in Britain in the 1960s and early 1970s, which included writers such as B. S. Johnson, Christine Brooke-Rose, Ann Quin and Giles Gordon. Burns wrote eight novels, a play and the script for two short films (one in collaboration with B. S. Johnson), as well as several short pieces, a book of interviews with writers, articles and edited an American report on pornography and censorship for publication in the UK. Burns was one of the earliest teachers of creative writing as an academic discipline in Britain, appointed as the first writer in residence on the University of East Anglia's Creative Writing Master's programme and later he went on to teach this discipline in both Australia and the USA. Burns also worked with Peter Whitehead, writing Jeanette Cochrane, a short experimental film in a montage style, which featured early music from Pink Floyd and an appearance by Nico.

== Biography and creative works ==
Alan Burns was born on 29 December 1929 to a middle-class family, the second of his parents' three sons. He attended Merchant Taylors' School, Northwood. Burns recounts his experiences at the school in fictionalised form in Buster, his first and most autobiographical novel. While at the school, Burns published an absurdist and satirical essay on Samuel Johnson in the school magazine, which he reuses in Buster. Burns subsequently did national service from 1949 to 1951 in the Royal Army Education Corps. He studied law at Middle Temple, and was called to the bar in 1956. He was assistant legal manager at Beaverbrook Newspapers from 1959 to 1962.

Buster, Burns's debut novel, was published by John Calder in 1961. Largely autobiographical, it recounts a middle-class childhood spent during the Second World War and an adolescence and young adulthood in its aftermath. Burns's brother and mother both died during the war, and the novel deals with the consequences of their deaths for the remaining family members. All of his subsequent works feature a protagonist who experiences the death of a parent or sibling, and the trauma this engenders.

With his second novel, Europe After the Rain, titled after the Max Ernst painting, Burns begins to use collage techniques and cut-ups. As a result, the writing becomes starker, more distanced, as the novel recounts the movements of an anonymous narrator moving through an unnamed but ruined country during a war that several, also anonymous, characters say has ended but whose violence persists so that the distinction between wartime and peacetime is blurred.

Celebrations transposes the techniques of Europe After the Rain into the workplace, where the violence persists, but is more concealed, occluded by family hierarchies and arcane legal structures. Burns's focus seems narrower, the narrative concentrating on a factory-owning family, particularly the patriarch, Williams and his son, Michael. After Williams's other son, Phillip, is killed in what might be an industrial accident but might also be at the hands of his brother, Williams and Michael compete for the attention of Phillip's widow, Jacqueline.

Following Celebrations, Burns published Babel, stylistically his most radical work, and the high point of his experimental phase, with no narrative, a huge cast of characters including politicians and celebrities of the time, and short sections of highly condensed, often grammatically difficult prose. Again, Burns's targets in the novel are the state, violence and power. The novel deals repeatedly with the Vietnam War, the effects of colonialism, religion, the amorality of the political class, the workplace, the violence inherent within the family, with the movement of money and state-sanctioned violence. But more than its explicit content, Burns's novel deals, on a structural level, with the increasing fragmentation of the society it depicts.

Babel received mixed reviews, even from those, like Robert Nye, whom Burns saw as supporters of his work, and sold relatively poorly. But Burns continued his commitment to its style in Dreamerika!, which traces a fictional history of the Kennedy family in America, seeing them as exemplars of the insidious movement of money and power, and of the relationship between politics and money. In the novel the Kennedys become mythical figures, but incredibly wealth and influence cannot shield them from an essentially tragic character, and as the various members die, it's possible to see Burns replicating his own family pattern.

Following the publication of Dreamerika!, Burns's style changes significantly. His next book, The Angry Brigade (Allison and Busby, 1973), presents a fictionalised account of several members of the short-lived British activist group known as The Angry Brigade. Burns presents their accounts in the form of transcripts from interviews, and in fact Burns did interview several people (including some left-wing activists) in preparing the novel. Though Burns is still working with found material, gone are the difficult to parse sentences, the bursts of incongruous images and non-sequiturs. Instead, the focus is on how a community performs its politics, and the way in which their personal interactions and day-to-day living conflict with their ideologies. The question of the efficacy and morality of using violence against the state in activist projects, as the real Angry Brigade did, and were imprisoned for, hangs heavy over the novel, and its protagonists endlessly discuss how they can avoid simply replicating the strategies of the state in their attempt to inspire political change.

Burns's drastic change in approach comes at a time when a great deal was changing in his personal life. In the early seventies his first marriage, to author and artist Carol Burns broke down, and Burns moved from being a full-time novelist to taking on teaching roles, where he became increasingly permanent as a member of staff. In 1974 this led to Burns moving to Australia to work as a senior tutor in creative writing at the Western Australia Institute of Technology (now Curtin University). Burns later taught creative writing at various educational institutions, including the University of East Anglia, Norwich, the City Literary Institute, London, the University of Minnesota, Minneapolis, and Lancaster University. Burns was the University of East Anglia's first writer-in-residence. Aspiring writers who came under his tutelage included Ian McEwan.

In his own accounts of the period, Burns suggests that the reasons for his change in writing style are political and theoretical, claiming to be inspired by Heinrich Böll's Nobel Prize acceptance speech, which extolled the virtues of writing plainly to achieve a political effect. Burns, in his interviews, seems uncomfortable with the associations that experimental writing has with elitism and, following Böll, sees the need for a plainly expressed writing which can speak to, and inform, a wide audience.

Alongside these personal and theoretical changes, the group of experimental writers that had formed in London in the mid sixties had lost much of its impetus following the suicides of Ann Quin and B.S. Johnson, both in 1973, less than three months apart, the first in August, the latter in early November. Burns had been close friends with Johnson. They wrote the short film Unfair together, and Burns considered writing a biography of Johnson, two short chapters of which appear in the 1997 Fall issue of the Review of Contemporary Fiction alongside another short piece by Burns and several critical essays.

In 1981, Burns published The Day Daddy Died, his most conventionally written novel. The novel traces the life of Norah, a working-class woman, whose life is made up of a series of encounters with institutions which exploit and oppress her, and with men who are representatives of those institutions. Toward the conclusion of the novel Norah and her large family (she has five children with five different partners) are confined to what Burns describes as "factory, hospital and work-camp [combined] into an all purpose institution to represent the power of the State", a particularly Thatcherite institution in which the workplace, the prison, the hospital and the school combine, and here in particular Burns seems to anticipate the sweatshops and maquiladoras that arrive with emerging globalisation. The novel is written in a very straightforward, vernacular style, and again Burns used interview material as his source for the novel.

In 1982 he co-edited (with Charles Sugnet) The Imagination on Trial: British and American writers discuss their working methods (published by Allison & Busby), which The Washington Post "Book World" called "diverting, iconoclastic, and compulsively readable". The book included interviews with 11 authors (as well as Burns himself): J. G. Ballard, Eva Figes, John Gardner, Wilson Harris, John Hawkes, B. S. Johnson, Tom Mallin, Michael Moorcock, Grace Paley, Ishmael Reed, and Alan Sillitoe.

Burns published his final novel in 1986. Revolutions of the Night was a return to a lighter prose style, and in places its short, gnomic utterances recall his work in Celebrations. Again the title is taken from a Max Ernst painting, and the focus is a wealthy, middle-class family in which one member, on this occasion the mother, dies early on, and the remainder of the novel is focussed on the fallout from her death. The novel consists of a series of set pieces, most of which concern the incestuous relationship between the two children of the family, Hazel and Max, a relationship which seems to shield them from the institutions of the state that they encounter. Midway through the novel a war, or revolution, appears to begin, Max is imprisoned and then released, and the novel ends, in scenes that are reminiscent of the ending of Europe After the Rain, the two siblings escape the country and live together.

Burns taught briefly at Lancaster University in the 1990s, before returning to London, where he moved in with his ex-wife, Carol Burns, as a lodger. This movement, back to his first wife, to his hometown, retraces the movement of the protagonist of Burns’s first novel, Buster, and is itself an instantiation of the traumatic encircling and repetition that takes place in his novels. He died in December 2013.

== Selected bibliography ==
=== As writer ===
- "Buster" inNew Writers 1 (Calder, 1961)
- Europe After the Rain (Calder, 1965)
- Celebrations (Calder and Boyars, 1967)
- Babel (Calder and Boyars, 1969)
- Dreamerika! A Surrealist Fantasy (Calder and Boyars, 1972)
- To Deprave and Corrupt: Pornography, Its Causes, Its Forms, Its Effects (Davis-Pointer, 1972)
- The Angry Brigade: A Documentary Novel (Allison & Busby, 1973)
- The Day Daddy Died (Allison & Busby, 1981, illus. Ian Breakwell)
- Revolutions of the Night (Allison & Busby, 1986)

=== As editor ===
- The Imagination on Trial: British and American Writers Discuss Their Working Wethods (co-edited with Charles Sugnet; Allison & Busby, 1982)
