= House Mother Normal =

1971 book by B.S. Johnson

- First edition
- Author: B. S. Johnson
- Language: English
- Publisher: Collins
- Publication date: 1971
- Publication place: United Kingdom
- Media type: Hardback and Paperback
- Pages: 201
- ISBN: 0-906427-62-2
- OCLC: 221859
- Dewey Decimal: 823/.9/14
- LC Class: PZ4.J668 Ho PR6060.O3
- Preceded by: The Unfortunates
- Followed by: Christie Malry's Own Double-Entry

House Mother Normal (subtitle – "A Geriatric Comedy") is a novel by the experimental writer B. S. Johnson. As is typical of Johnson's work the novel is written in an unorthodox style, with the story being mainly told through the perspectives of the residents of a nursing home, each going through progressively worse states of dementia.

== Plot summary ==
The novel is set in a nursing home. It follows part of a typical day for a group of elderly people, both male and female. Their thoughts, memories and opinions of each other and the abusive House Mother (head matron) are explored as they go about their activities, which include: dining, singing, making items for the House Mother to sell on the black market, playing pass-the-parcel in which the prize is faeces from the House Mother's dog Ralphie, exercising, participating in wheelchair jousts using dirty mops at the House Mother's instruction, forced to laugh at the House Mother's ageist jokes, and then being made to watch Ralphie perform cunnilingus on the House Mother.

The novel is told through first the perspective of eight residents of the nursing home, each of whom is given a "CQ count", a dementia test scored out of ten. It starts with the most-aware person, Sarah Lamson (CQ count: 10/10), followed by Charlie Edwards (10/10), Ivy Nicholls (10/10), Ron Lamson (8/10), Gloria Ridge (6/10), Sioned Bowen (8/10), George Hedbury (2/10) and Rosetta Stanton (0/10), who has the most advanced form of dementia. The final chapter is told from the perspective of the House Mother.

== Development ==
=== Title ===
House Mother Normal had several working titles, which included We all got it coming!, The Old Maids, A Most Efficient Almoner, St Joseph's Hospice for the Dying and Orphans in Reverse.

== Style ==
Each character in the book has their own section, 21 pages in length except for the final section narrated by the House Mother. Each of these sections starts at the same point in the day, and likewise each section ends at the same point at the end of the day. Therefore, the reader is given insight into each character's unique interpretation of the same string of events. This method of writing allows for the characters' actions and conversations to mingle and intertwine. Johnson provides each character with a mixture of dialogue and interior monologue to express their personalities during the course of their section. The thoughts of the final two residents demonstrate that they are almost completely senile, although rare moments of lucidity briefly shine through, to powerful dramatic effect.

At the beginning of each character's section is an explanatory table, providing us with information on the character, including age, condition and mental faculty. As the reader progresses through the sections each character is increasingly older and/or more senile than the characters in the preceding sections. Finally we get the House Mother's section, and we learn her opinions of those in her care.

Johnson frequently uses humour in this novel, though it is at times written with a serious tone.

== Reception ==
Reviewing the novel in The Observer, Stephen Wall commented positively on the use of white space in the pages. He also liked the sympathy treated towards the elderly characters, but described the tone of the novel as uneasy. Christopher Wordsworth's review in The Guardian praised the device of the elderly going through senility, but believed the ending with the House Mother and Ralphie having sex was a mistake. Gavin Ewart said in the Evening Standard that House Mother Normal was, "a remarkable book" as well as, "original and extremely well written."
