= Eva Figes =

English author and feminist (1932–2012)

- Born: Eva Unger; 15 April 1932; Berlin
- Died: 28 August 2012; Greater London
- Education: Queen Mary College
- Occupations: Writer, novelist, social critic
- Spouse: John George Figes
- Children: Kate Figes; Orlando Figes
- Awards: Guardian Fiction Prize (1967)

Eva Figes (/ˈfaɪdʒiːz/; née Unger; 15 April 1932 – 28 August 2012) was an English author and feminist. Figes wrote novels, literary criticism, studies of feminism, and vivid memoirs relating to her Berlin childhood and later experiences as a Jewish refugee from Hitler's Germany.

== Early life and education ==
Born Eva Unger in Berlin, Germany, in 1932 to an affluent, secular Jewish family, she arrived in Britain as a refugee in 1939 with her mother Irma Unger, and her younger brother, Ernst. During Kristallnacht in November 1938, her father Emil was arrested and sent to Dachau concentration camp. He was later released after his wife offered the Nazis a large bribe and managed to escape to England to join his family in London. At least three of Figes's grandparents on both sides of the family died in concentration camps. Towards the end of the World War II, Figes recalled in The Observer in 1979, "my mother gave me nine pence and sent me off to the local cinema ... I sat alone in the dark and watched the newsreel of Belsen". It gave her nightmares for many years.

She graduated with a B.A. with honours from Queen Mary College in London in 1953.

== Career ==
She married John George Figes on 10 July 1954. The couple had two children: the writer Kate Figes (1957–2019), and the historian Orlando Figes. The marriage was dissolved by divorce in 1962. She met the German author Günter Grass in London and the two had a short romantic affair that turned into a lifelong friendship.

In the 1960s, she was associated with an informal group of experimental British writers influenced by Rayner Heppenstall that included Stefan Themerson, Ann Quin, Alan Burns, and its informal leader, B. S. Johnson. Unger worked in publishing until 1967, when she became a full-time writer.

Figes's best known work is Patriarchal Attitudes, a feminist polemic written in 1970, published one month before Germaine Greer's The Female Eunuch. The book argued that nurture rather than nature has shaped all secondary sex characteristics and considered why prominent female figures of the nineteenth century were ambivalent or hostile towards the feminist movement.

Figes' novel Light (1983) is an impressionistic portrait of a single day in the life of Claude Monet from sunrise to sunset.

Figes' BBC 3 radio play, The True Tale of Margery Kempe (1985), dramatizes the life of the 15th-century English mystic and pilgrim Margery Kempe.

== Awards ==
Figes won the Guardian Fiction Prize for Winter Journey in 1967.

== Legacy ==
Figes' archive was acquired by the British Library in 2009 consisting of 186 files of drafts and working papers relating to her literary works, as well as correspondence and personal papers.

== Selected bibliography ==
=== Fiction ===
- Equinox (Secker & Warburg, 1966)
- Winter Journey (Faber & Faber, 1967)
- Konek Landing (Faber & Faber, 1969)
- B (Faber & Faber, 1972)
- Days (Faber & Faber, 1974)
- Nelly's Version (Hamish Hamilton, 1977; Dalkey Archive, 2002)
- Waking (Hamish Hamilton, 1981)
- Light (Hamish Hamilton, 1983)
- The Seven Ages (Hamish Hamilton, 1986)
- Ghosts (Hamish Hamilton, 1988)
- The Tree of Knowledge (Sinclair-Stevenson, 1990)
- The Tenancy (Sinclair-Stevenson, 1993)
- The Knot (Sinclair-Stevenson, 1996)

=== Literary and social criticism ===
- Patriarchal Attitudes: Women in Society (Stein & Day, 1970)
- Tragedy and Social Evolution (Calder, 1976)
- Sex and Subterfuge: Women Writers to 1850 (Macmillan, 1982)
- Women's Letters in Wartime, 1450-1945 (Pandora, 1993)

=== Memoirs ===
- Little Eden: A Child at War (Faber & Faber, 1978)
- Tales of Innocence and Experience: An Exploration (Bloomsbury, 2003)
- Journey to Nowhere (Granta, 2008)
