= A Hundred Thousand Billion Poems =

1961 book by Raymond Queneau

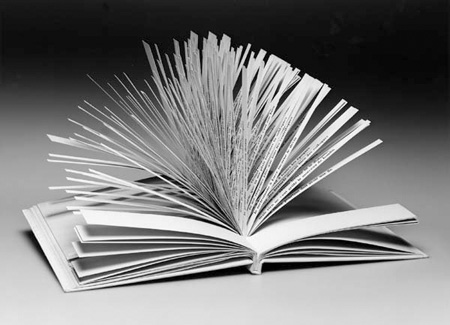
- Author: Raymond Queneau
- Original title: Cent mille milliards de poèmes
- Language: French
- Genre: Experimental literature, Poetry
- Published: 1961
- Publisher: Gallimard
- Publication place: France
- Media type: Print (paper)

A Hundred Thousand Billion Poems or One hundred million million poems (original French title: Cent mille milliards de poèmes) is a book by Raymond Queneau, published in 1961. The book is a set of ten sonnets printed on card with each line on a separate strip. As all ten sonnets have not just the same rhyme scheme but the same rhyme sounds, any lines from a sonnet can be combined with any from the nine others, allowing for 10^{14} (= 100,000,000,000,000) different poems. When Queneau ran into trouble creating the book, he solicited the help of mathematician Francois Le Lionnais, and in the process they initiated Oulipo.

The original French version of the book was designed by Robert Massin. Two full translations into English have been published, those by John Crombie and Stanley Chapman. Beverley Charles Rowe's translation, one that uses the same rhyme sounds, has been published online. In 1984, Edition Zweitausendeins in Frankfurt published a German translation by Ludwig Harig. In 2002, Moscow ГрантЪ published a Russian translation by Tatiana Bonch-Osmolovskaya.

In 1997, a French court decision outlawed the publication of the original poem on the Internet, citing the Queneau estate and Gallimard publishing house's exclusive moral right.

== See also ==
- Copyright law in France
- Cybertext
- Star Gauge
