= B. S. Johnson =

English novelist, poet and critic (1933–1973)

- B. S. Johnson as shown on the cover of his posthumous final novel See the Old Lady Decently.
- Born: Bryan Stanley William Johnson; 5 February 1933; Hammersmith, London, England
- Died: 13 November 1973 (aged 40); Islington, London, England
- Education: King's College London
- Occupations: Novelist, poet and director
- Writing career
- Period: Early 1960s to early 1970s
- Genre: Fictional prose
- Notable works: Albert Angelo (1964), Christie Malry's Own Double-Entry (1973)
- Movement: Modernism

Bryan Stanley William Johnson (5 February 1933 – 13 November 1973) was an English experimental novelist, poet and literary critic. He also produced television programmes and made films.

== Early life ==
Johnson was born into a working-class family, the only child of a bookseller's stock-keeper, Stanley Wilfred Johnson (1908–1973), and a waitress-cum-barmaid, Emily Jane (1908–1971, née Lambird), of Hammersmith, London. During the Second World War they moved to nearby Barnes.

Johnson was evacuated from London twice during the war. Having been educated at Flora Gardens Primary School, Hammersmith, he and his mother were moved to Chobham, Surrey in 1939 for two years, and he attended the village school. After a brief return to Hammersmith, he was sent alone in 1941 to High Wycombe, Buckinghamshire, where he attended a local school. Having failed the eleven plus examination, he was unable to enter Latymer School at Hammersmith and spent the last year of the war at Highfields Secondary Modern School. On his return home, he attended Barnes County Secondary Modern School, before "passing some sort of simple examination" allowing him to transfer to Kingston Day Commercial School, where "they taught me shorthand, typing, and bookkeeping. Useful."

Johnson left school when he was 16 years old to work variously as an accounting clerk for a building company and for a baker, as a bank junior and as a clerk at Standard Oil, but taught himself Latin in the evenings, attended a year's pre-university course at Birkbeck College, and with this preparation, managed to pass the university entrance exam for King's College London in 1956.

In later life he settled in Islington, north London, living in Claremont Square and Myddelton Square, after which he bought a house in Dagmar Terrace, Islington, where he lived until his death. On 31 March 1964 he married Virginia Ann Kimpton (b. 1938), a teaching machine programmer; she figures as Ginnie in his novel Trawl. They had two children.

== Career ==
Johnson's novel The Unfortunates was printed in 27 separate unbound sections: the opening chapter called "First", the final chapter called "Last", and the other 25 to be read in any order.

After graduating with a 2:2 degree in 1959, he worked as a private tutor and supply teacher in Surrey, while writing increasingly experimental and often acutely personal novels. In his early years he collaborated on several projects with a close friend and fellow writer, Zulfikar Ghose, with whom he produced a joint collection of stories, Statement Against Corpses. Like Johnson's early stories, at least superficially, his first two novels, Travelling People (1963) and Albert Angelo (1964) initially appear relatively conventional in plot terms. However, the first uses several innovative devices and includes a section set out as a film script. The second includes famously cut-through pages to enable the reader to skip forward. His work became progressively even more experimental. The Unfortunates (1969) was published in a box with no binding (readers could assemble the book any way they liked, apart from the chapters marked "First" and "Last", which indicated preferred terminal points. BBC producer Lorna Pegram employed him to talk about this creation for the TV series Release. With barely any negotiation, the interview was complete months before the book was ready for publication. House Mother Normal (1971) was written in purely chronological order such that various characters' thoughts and experiences would cross each other and intertwine, not just page by page, but sentence by sentence. He won the Eric Gregory Award in 1962 and the Somerset Maugham Award in 1967.

Johnson led and associated with a loose circle of experimental authors in 1960s Britain, who included Alan Burns, Eva Figes, Rayner Heppenstall, Ann Quin, Stefan Themerson, Wilson Harris and others. Many contributed to London Consequences, a novel consisting of a palimpsest of chapters passed between a range of participating authors, edited by Margaret Drabble and Johnson. Johnson also made numerous experimental films, published poetry, and wrote reviews, short stories and plays. For some years he was poetry editor of Transatlantic Review.

He is mentioned several times in Paul Theroux's account of his friendship with V. S. Naipaul, Sir Vidia's Shadow (1998).

== Death and legacy ==
Johnson became depressed by his failure to succeed commercially and by mounting family problems. On 13 November 1973, aged 40, he took his own life by slitting his wrists at 9, Dagmar Terrace, Islington, London N1. He left an estate valued at £9,621. The day before his death he had told his agent: "I shall be much more famous once I'm dead."

Johnson's following at the time of his death was small, but enthusiastic; he quickly acquired a posthumous cult following, helped by a critically acclaimed film adaptation in 2000 of the last novel of his to appear in his lifetime, Christie Malry's Own Double-Entry (1973). Singer-songwriter Joe Pernice paid tribute to Johnson on the 2006 Pernice Brothers album Live a Little. Jonathan Coe's 2004 biography Like a Fiery Elephant (winner of the 2005 Samuel Johnson Prize) again led to a renewal of interest in Johnson's work. Coe himself is now a president of the B. S. Johnson Society, which aims "to bring closer Johnson scholars, readers and aficionados alike in their various approaches to the author's life and work."

In April 2013, the British Film Institute released You're Human Like the Rest of Them, a collection of Johnson's films, as part of the BFI Flipside DVD series.

In 2015, the Nottingham Five Leaves Bookshop held an event called "But I Know This City!" focused on Johnson's novel The Unfortunates, which is set there. It took participants round the city to listen to live readings of the novel's sections in whatever order they chose.

Indie pop band Los Campesinos! has cited the literature of B. S. Johnson among their non-musical influences, praising Coe's biography, with Johnson's work inspiring titles and lyrics of their music.

There is a collection of B. S. Johnson's literary papers and correspondence in the British Library (Add MS 89001).

In 2020, Matthew Harle compiled a selection of proposals of Johnson's abandoned work, titled Can I Come In and Talk About These and Other Ideas? 13 Proposals from B.S. Johnson. Harle writes: "B.S. Johnson's proposals should provide consolation, encouragement, despair and disbelief for anyone who has ever tried to get an idea realised."

== Bibliography ==
=== Novels ===
- Travelling People (1963)
- Albert Angelo (1964)
- Trawl (1966)
- The Unfortunates (1969)
- House Mother Normal (1971)
- Christie Malry's Own Double-Entry (1973)
- See the Old Lady Decently (1975, posthumous publication)

=== Poetry and anthologies, including those edited by Johnson ===
- Poems (1964)
- The Evacuees (1968)
- Poems Two (1972)
- London Consequences: A Novel (1972). A novel with each chapter composed by a different author including Johnson, Margaret Drabble, Paul Ableman and others
- All Bull: The National Servicemen (1973)
- Aren't You Rather Young to be Writing Your Memoirs? (1973). A collection of Johnson's shorter prose written between 1960 and 1973
- You Always Remember the First Time (1975)
- Well Done God! Selected Prose and Drama of B.S.Johnson (2013). A collection edited by Jonathan Coe, Philip Tew and Julia Jordan.
- Can I Come In and Talk About These and Other Ideas? (2021). A collection of Johnson's previously unpublished proposals to commissioning editors, TV producers, and literary agents. Edited by Matthew Harle.

== Selected filmography ==
- You're Human Like the Rest of Them (1967)
- The Unfortunates (1969)
- The Smithsons on Housing (1970)
- Paradigm (1969)
- B. S. Johnson on Dr. Samuel Johnson (1971)
- Unfair! (1970)
- Fat Man On A Beach (1973)

=== Biography ===
- Jonathan Coe. (2004) Like A Fiery Elephant: The Story of B.S. Johnson. Picador

=== Academic studies ===
- Philip Tew (2001), B. S. Johnson: A Critical Reading. Manchester University Press, ISBN 978-0719056260
- Krystyna Stamirowska (2006), B. S. Johnson's Novels: A Paradigm of Truth. Kraków: Universitas, ISBN 8324207457
- Philip Tew and Glyn White (2007), Re-reading B. S. Johnson. Palgrave Macmillan, ISBN 978-0230524927
- Vanessa Guignery (2009), Ceci n'est pas une fiction. Les romans vrais de B.S. Johnson. Presses de l'Université Paris-Sorbonne, ISBN 978-2840506430
- Nicolas Tredell (2010), Fighting Fictions: The Novels of B. S. Johnson. Paupers' Press, ISBN 978-0946650996
- Vanessa Guignery, ed. (2015), The B.S. Johnson / Zulfikar Ghose Correspondence. Cambridge Scholars Publishing, ISBN 978-1443872669
- Sebastian Groes (2016), "English Anti-Novels", in: British Fictions of the Sixties. New York and London: Bloomsbury, ISBN 978-0826495570
