= Hex =

Hex usually refers to:

- Curse, a type of malicious wish
- Hexadecimal, a base-16 number system often used in computer nomenclature

Hex, HEX, or The Hex may also refer to:

== Magic ==
- Hex sign, a barn decoration originating in Pennsylvania Dutch regions of the United States
- Hex work, a Pennsylvania Dutch (German) folk magic system also known as pow-wow

== Engineering and technology ==
- Hex key, a tool also known as a hex wrench or Allen wrench, used to drive fasteners
- Hex key, a number sign (#) key on telephones (regional term used in Singapore and Malaysia)
- High-energy X-rays, sometimes abbreviated "HEX-rays"
- Hexcentric, an item of climbing protection equipment
- Heat exchanger, a device for heat transfer
- Hypersonic Flight Experiment, a planned mission of the Indian Space Research Organisation
- Intel HEX, a computer file format
- Uranium hexafluoride, a compound used in nuclear fuel refinement
- Hex color, a six-digit, three-byte hexadecimal number used in computing applications to represent colors

== Businesses and services ==
- Hex'Air, an airline based in southern France
- Heathrow Express, a train service in London
- Nasdaq Helsinki, formerly the Helsinki Stock Exchange

== Games and sport ==
- Hex, a hexagonal tile of a hex map, used in war and strategy board games
- Hex (board game), a mathematical strategy game played on a hexagonal grid or rhombus
- Hex (climbing), an item of rock climbing equipment used to arrest a fall
- Hex (video game), a 1985 computer game for the Amiga and Atari ST
- Hex: Shards of Fate, an MMO trading card game by Cryptozoic Entertainment
- Hex – The Legend of the Towers, a Vekoma Madhouse ride at the Alton Towers Resort, England
- The Hexagonal (CONCACAF), final round of FIFA World Cup qualifiers for North America, Central America, and the Caribbean
- Hex, pseudonym of the puzzle writers Emily Cox and Henry Rathvon
- The Hex (video game), a 2018 computer game by the creator of Pony Island

== Places ==
- Hex River, a tributary of the Breede River in South Africa
- Hex River, a tributary of the Elands River in South Africa
- Hexham railway station, Northumberland, England

== Arts and media ==
=== Books ===
- Hex (1998 novel), a dystopian novel for young adults by Rhiannon Lassiter
- Hex, a 2011 science fiction novel by Allen Steele
- HEX (2013 novel), a Dutch horror novel by Thomas Olde Heuvelt, published in English in 2016

=== Fictional characters ===
- Hex (Ben 10), a villain in the Ben 10 franchise
- Hex (Discworld), a computer in Terry Pratchett's Discworld novels
- Hex Schofield, a companion of the Seventh Doctor in a series of Doctor Who audio plays
- Hex, an illusionist and escapologist in the Marvel Comics series ClanDestine
- Hex, an undead elven sorceress in the Skylanders video game franchise, and its animated series adaptation, Skylanders Academy
- HEX, an evil organization in the novel InterWorld
- Jonah Hex, a DC Comics character
- The Hex Girls, a fictitious musical group in the Scooby-Doo franchise

=== Film, television and stage ===
- HEX, in WandaVision is a nickname for the city of Westview
- Hex (1973 film), a 1973 film starring Keith Carradine, Gary Busey, Dan Haggerty, and Hillarie Thompson
- Hex, a 1980 Hong Kong film directed by Kuei Chih-Hung
- Hex (2015 film), a 2015 film directed by Clarence Peters
- Hex, a 2018 film directed by Rudolf Buitendach
- Hex, an upcoming film directed by Dave Green
- Hex (musical), a 2021 musical based on the Charles Perrault version of Sleeping Beauty
- Hex (TV series), a 2004–2005 supernatural/horror drama on British television
- Jonah Hex (film), a 2010 film based on a DC Comics character
- Mr. Hex, a 1946 Bowery Boys comedy film
- Stephanie Bendixsen (born 1985), presenter for Australian TV show Good Game, known by the gamertag Hex

=== Music ===
==== Musical artists ====
- Hex, an indie rock duo formed in 1988 by Steve Kilbey and Donnette Thayer
- Hex (VJ group), a British-based multimedia group active in the 1990s which later became Hexstatic
- Hex Hector (born 1965), American dance remixer

==== Songs and albums ====
- Hex (Bark Psychosis album), 1994
- Hex (Hex album), 1989, by the indie rock duo Hex
- Hex (Jon McKiel album), 2024
- Hex (Poison Girls album), 1979
- Hex, a 2003 album by the Los Angeles-based rock band Bigelf
- Hex; Or Printing in the Infernal Method, a 2005 album by the band Earth
- "Hex" (song), by Rezz and 1788-L
- "Hex", a 2014 song co-written by Wax Motif and Tommy Trash

== See also ==
- Hex game (disambiguation)
- Hexes (disambiguation)
- Hexing (disambiguation)
- Hexed (disambiguation)
- Hexx: Heresy of the Wizard, a 1994 video game
- "The Hexx", a song by the band Pavement
- HHEX, hematopoietically expressed homeobox protein
