= Unleash =

Unleash may refer to:

- Unleash (EP), a Band-Maid EP
- "Unleash" (song), a Soulfly song
- Unleash Award, a Dutch literary award

== See also ==
- Unleashed (disambiguation)
