= Hex (comics) =

Hex, in comics, may refer to:

- Hex, a Marvel Comics character by the name of Dominic Destine, who is one of the ClanDestine
- Jonah Hex, who is also known as Hex in an alternate future

It may also refer to:

- Hexon, a Wildstorm character and member of the Warguard, who appeared in Stormwatch
- Hokum & Hex, a series from Marvel Comics' Razorline imprint created by Clive Barker
- Generation Hex, an Amalgam's comic book which also include the character Jono Hex
- Generation Hex, a team of mutants which appears in the comic book of the same name

== See also ==
- Hex (disambiguation)
