= Hex game =

Hex game may refer to:

- Hex (board game), a strategy board game played on a hexagonal grid
- Hex (video game), a turn-based strategy game for Atari ST and Amiga
- Hex: Shards of Fate, a massively multiplayer online trading card game
- Hex-based game or hex map, a game board design commonly used in wargames

== See also ==
- Hex (disambiguation)
