= The Day the World Turned Upside Down =

2013 short story by Thomas Olde Heuvelt

"The Day The World Turned Upside Down" is a magical realism story by Dutch writer Thomas Olde Heuvelt, first published in 2013 in Dutch as "De vis in de fles" (literally, "The Fish in the Bottle"); the English version (translated by Lia Belt) appeared on Lightspeed in 2014.

== Synopsis ==
Shortly after Sophie tells Toby that their relationship is over, the world is devastated by the direction of gravity being reversed, and so he sets out through the wreckage in an attempt to rescue her.

== Reception ==
"De Vis in de Fles" won the 2013 Paul Harland Prize.

"The Day the World Turned Upside Down" won the 2015 Hugo Award for Best Novelette, having been added to the ballot to replace John C. Wright's "Yes, Virginia, There is a Santa Claus", which had been ruled ineligible. Io9 noted that it was the only nominee that year whose presence on the ballot could not be attributed to the Sad Puppies, and emphasized that second place went to "No Award".

Tangent Online lauded the prose as "strange and haunting", but observed that Toby was "too selfish" for the story to be enjoyable, and that although the story was "definitely an interesting concept" (as a literalized metaphor, "Toby's physical world mirror(s) his mental world that is turned upside down by his breakup"), it also "dragged on a bit".
