= Tais Teng =

Dutch fiction author (born 1952)

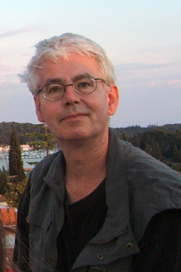
- Born: Thijs van Ebbenhorst Tengbergen; 1952 (age 73–74); The Hague, Netherlands
- Education: Studied biology in Utrecht University
- Occupations: Writer, sculptor, illustrator, writing coach
- Writing career
- Genres: fantasy fiction, detective, historical fiction, horror, middle grade fiction, Young Adult Fiction and science fiction
- Notable awards: Paul Harland Prize (x4) Archeon Oeuvre Prijs
- Website: taisteng.atspace.com

Tais Teng (born 1952 in The Hague) is one pen name of Thijs van Ebbenhorst Tengbergen, a Dutch writer of fantasy fiction, hardboiled detective, children's books, and science fiction. Teng also works as an illustrator, sculptor, and writing coach. Teng has additionally written under the names Eban Hourst and Ben Bergen.

Tais Teng has written more than a hundred novels both for adults and children in Dutch. He has won the Paul Harland Prize four times. His books have been translated into German, Finnish, French, and English, with Teng himself being a Dutch and English bilingual writer.

He has co-authored short stories and novels with Paul Harland, Eddy C. Bertin, Bies van Ede, Roderick Leeuwenhart, Roelof Goudriaan, and Jaap Boekestein.

== The Dutch ziltpunk movement ==
Tais Teng is one of the founders of ziltpunk, a literary movement that seeks to counter the apathetic dismay of many dystopian novels. The ziltpunk stories belong to climate fiction, which looks for solutions to the climate crisis. It is also the Dutch equivalent of solarpunk. The rising sea level is an urgent problem for the Dutch, with half their land below sea level.
Ziltpunk describes massive geoengineering projects which writers consider the only way to counter climate change. Sixty-meter-high dikes, mangrove islands planted in the sea to counter flood waves, or even raising the land itself by injecting the underlying chalk layers with hydrogen sulfide are some key examples in the text.
Several ziltpunk stories have been published in English, such as Any House in the Storm, Tidal Treasures or Growing Up Along the Mile-High Dyke, Buitendyks, and Where the Night-Gulls Yodel.

== Bibliography ==
(English works only, see the Dutch Wikipedia version for novels in that language)

=== Novels and collections ===
- The Emerald Boy (YA novel), Miyu Magic stones, ISBN 978-90-810858-2-3
- With Musket and Ducat (novella), XIII Stories of Transformation
- Embrace the Night (novella set in the Nightland of Willam Hope Hodgson), nightland.website
- Lovecraft, my love (collection)
- Embrace the night and other stories (collection)
- Phaedra: Alastor 824 (novel, in the Alastor Cluster series), Spatterlight Press
- When the Night-gaunt Knows your Name (Children's book)

=== Short stories ===
- "Slow as glaciers and their swords all aflame," Aurelia Lion
- "Praying to Thasaidon," Cirsova (set in Clark Ashton Smith's Zothique)
- "Riders on the storm," Dimension Six
- "Walking the thrice-blessed road," Stories for the Thoughtful Young
- "The shipwright's Lover," Longshot Island 9 (set in Clark Ashton Smith's Zothique)
- "True silk," Unreal 4
- "Make the second shot count," Low life Journal
- "Slow-boat inspector," Daily science fiction
- "Playing stalker in the night," Itty Bitty writing space
- "Ice words and fire fonts," Mad scientist Journal
- "A perfect day with the dead men shrieking and the sky filled with northern light," Red Sun magazine (Cthulhu Mythos)
- "Why we are standing on a broken wall, clutching swords too rusty to take an edge," Battling in all her finery
- "You should have seen their faces," Daily Science Fiction
- "The story of Mynheer Reynaerde and the purloined tails," The Worlds of Science Fiction, Fantasy and Horror
- "Assassin's Scroll," Black cat magazine
- "In her fingerless hands she holds the ice and all the oceans," Unfit Magazine
- "Tidal Treasure, or Growing up along the Mile-high Dyke," Future science fiction digest
- "Watching the Space-stations Rise," Write Ahead, volume 2
- "The Magician's Left Hand," Switchblade #6
- "Doch das Messer sieht man nicht," Switchblade #4
- "The cowboy who loved lady Liberty," Albedo One #47
- "America first," More Alternative truths
- "Dancing for Azathoth," The Worlds of Science Fiction, Fantasy and Horror (Cthulhu Mythos)
- "For the greater good of all," Singular Irregularity
- "Growing up with your dead sister," Pulp Literature #8
- "Tokyo Nights," Tokyo Yakuza: Issues #1 - #24
- "Any house in the storm," Crossed Genres
- "An Overview of the Infernal Regions," Hell II: Citizens
- "Al-Adrian and the magic lamp," Faery wicked tales
- "The art of losing wars gracefully," The end is the beginning
- "The further adventures of Jesus: The First seal: Conquest"
- "And the sky is filled with eyes," nightland.website (set in William Hope Hodgson's Night Land)
- "Respect of Headwaiters," Perihelion Science Fiction (12-AUG-2014)
- "Expiating ancestral sins," Albedo One #31 (2006)
- "Crowned by Lightning," Albedo One #18 (1998)
- "A Girl Like Tiadi," Pandora #21 (1988)
- "Green-ache," Amazing (Nov. 1989)
- "Worthy enemy," Hardboiled #10
- "What Avails a Psalm in the Cinders of Gehenna?," SF International #2 (1987)
- "Palimpsests," Dragon
- "Disslish the Aquamancer," Terra sf

=== Essays ===
- "The joy of very long titles and why publishers hate them," Mythaxis
- "Channeling Jack Vance, shared worlds and writing in another man's universe"
- "Better not call your dark lord Bill Smith," Mythaxis
- "Five steps closer to the ending of your novel," Mythaxis
- "Artist interview with Michael Swanwick," Mythaxis
- "First lines or how to seduce your editor," Mythaxis
- "Make Your Own Book of Spells: How to Use Grimoires and Unholy Scrolls from Ancient Tombs," Mythaxis

== Art ==
Teng uses computer-generated fractals and kaleidoscopic mandalas to construct his landscapes. For his black and white illustrations, he often uses scraperboard or digital etchings. He also paints murals and background decors for plays, for which he had trained as a decor painter at the art academy Artibus in Utrecht.

== Pulp Literature Press ==
- Pulp Literature, Issue 3, 2014
- Pulp Literature, Issue 6, 2015
- Pulp Literature, Issue 9, 2016
- Pulp Literature, Issue 19, 2018

== Further reading and sources ==
- Van Duin, John, Ziltpunk: zeker geen zure bedoening, HSF (2019/1) Ziltpunk: zeker geen zure bedoening – HSF (2019/1) – NCSF
- de Valk, Arnold, Abstracte kunst heeft meestal geen verhaal, Amersfoorts Dagblad, 28 June 2017

Tais Teng

- Bruinsma Robin, Als de dood voor kleine foutjes, Algemeen Dagblad, 9 May 2007
- Verschuren, Herman, Lezen over Tais Teng, ISBN 9054832665
- Nielsch, Astrid (interview with tais Teng about his art Asni's Art Blog: Interview with Tais Teng
- Barkel, Theo, De ideeënmachine Tais Teng SF Terra - De ideeënmachine Tais Teng
- Lindeboom, Martijn, De 5 w's van Tais Teng De 5 w's van Tais Teng
- Lodder, Arie, The Dutch are coming 2: Tais Teng The Dutch are coming 2: Tais Teng | Europa SF - The European Speculative Fiction portal
- Lodder, Arie, review Lovecraft, my love
- Interview about Tais Teng's love of long titles in Mad Scientist journal An Interview with Tais Teng
- Q-magazine-edition 5, Schrijver van eigen bodem Schrijver van eigen bodem • Tais Teng
- Kaptein, Peter, Fantastische kunstenaars: Tais Teng Fantastische Kunstenaars: Tais Teng
- In de ban van de fantasy, Meer met media, September 2008
- Adelmund, Martijn, De wilde werkelijkheid van Gran Terre, Warp, 2009, ISSN 1385-1616
