= Paul Harland Prize =

Dutch literary award

The Harland Prize is the oldest annual award for original Dutch short science fiction, fantasy or horror stories. It was originally called the King Kong Award, than the Millennium Award, than it was renamed after Dutch science fiction author Paul Harland, who died in 2003, and later on it was renamed again to Harland Award.

This award is for short stories and novelettes, but the word count changed sometimes.

== History ==
The award was presented for the first time in 1976 by SF fan and critic Rob Vooren, on the occasion of a short story contest which had been organised that same year. Initially, Vooren called it the King Kong Award, and also published an irregular fanzine with the same name.

Over the next ten years, the contest was mostly organised by Rob Vooren, who not only assembled the jury, but also ensured availability of the prize money (usually 1000 guilders), and later enlisted the help of a publisher. In 1984 this finally resulted in professional publication for the award winners.

In 1987 Rob Vooren handed over the organisation for the last time, to a rotating committee. For reasons of credibility, and with a view to attracting more sponsors, it was decided in 1996 to change the name to Millennium Prize. Following the death of Paul Harland, who had not only won the award several times, but had also organised it, in addition to being on the jury more often than almost anyone else, the prize was given his name in 2003.

In 2011 the Prize was organized by author Martijn Lindeboom, who in 2013 collaborated on it with author Thomas Olde Heuvelt. In 2016, authors Floris Kleijne and Esther Scherpenisse organized the award. In 2017, the Harland Awards were organized for the first time by a four-headed organization consisting of Mariska Reniers, Freya Sixma, Jorrit de Klerk and Yarrid Dhooghe.

In 2013, there was a record number of entries, 206 stories (totaling some 1.3 million words), in the following years the number of entries stabilized around 200. In 2015, the writing competition was renamed Harland Awards and the novel prize was briefly added. The first Harland Awards Novel Prize was won by Auke Hulst with his science fiction novel Sleep Softly, Johnny Idaho. In 2023, the prize was again renamed and is now called the 'Harland Prize'.

== Winning authors ==
Edition	First	Second	Third	Fourth	Fifth
1976	Bert Vos				
1977	Peter Cuijpers	Guido Eekhaut	Annemarie van Ewijck	Eddy C. Bertin	Martin Berkelaar
1978	Wim Burkunk	Wim Burkunk	Peter Cuijpers	Eddy C. Bertin	Kathinka Lannoy
1979	Tais Teng	Robert Smets	Frank Frankhuizen	Luuk Simonis	Eddy C. Bertin
1980	Bert Vos	Peter Cuijpers	Rob Zaagman	Sophie van der Waaij	Eddy C. Bertin / Frank Visser
1981	<not granted>	Sophie van der Waaij	Jan Bee Landman		
1983	Gert and Jan J.B. Kuipers	Peter Cuijpers	Paul Harland / Tais Teng		Reinold Widemann
1984	Paul Harland and Tais Teng / Peter Cuijpers		Paul Harland	Jan J.B. Kuipers	Gerben Hellinga jr
1985	Gerben Hellinga, Jr. / Tais Teng		Tais Teng	Gerben Hellinga, Jr.	Jan J.B. Kuipers
1986	Thomas Wintner	Jan Bee Landman	Jan J.B. Kuipers	Guido Eekhaut	Jan J.B. Kuipers
1987	Jan J.B. Kuipers	Jannelies Smit & Paul Harland	Eddy C. Bertin	Antony den Ridder	Guido Eekhaut / Jan Bee Landman
1988	Paul Evenblij	Thomas Cool	Gerben Hellinga Jr	Peter Cuijpers	Rijna Elijzen
1989	Tais Teng	Julien C. Raasveld	Jan Bee Landman and Paul Harland	Peter Cuijpers	Jan J.B. Kuipers
1990	Paul Harland	Jan Bee Landman	Thomas Wintner	Gerben Hellinga Jr	Jan J. B. Kuipers
1991	Peter Cuijpers	Jan J. B. Kuipers	Martin Berkelaar	Gerben Hellinga Jr	Peter Cuijpers
1992	Mike Jansen and Paul Harland	Paul van Leeuwenkamp	Jaap Boekestein	Nico Stikker	Geeske M. Kruseman / Paul van Leeuwenkamp
1994	Nico Stikker	Peter Cuijpers	Vincent Hoberg	Jan J.B. Kuipers	Tony de Haan
1995	Paul Harland and Vincent Hoberg	Jan J. B. Kuipers	Paul van Leeuwenkamp	Martijn Kregting	Dirk Bontes
1996	Dirk Bontes	Jan J.B. Kuipers	Mark J. Ruyffelaert	Frank van Dongen	Martijn Kregting
1997	Jan J.B. Kuipers	Bart van Geldrop	Paul Evenblij	Gerben Hellinga Jr	Nico Stikker
1998	Henri Achten	Richard Meijer	Marcel Orie	Henri Achten	Jay Hill
1999	Sophia Drenth	Mirjam Gielen	Sophia Drenth	Cor Oosting	Diana van der Pluijm
2000	Anne-Claire Verham	Chris Braga / Jan J.B. Kuipers		Anne-Claire Verham	Mirjam Gielen
2001	Paul Evenblij	Dirk Bontes	Chris Braga	Mirjam Gielen	Chris Braga
2002	Dirk Bontes	Peter Kaptein	Robert Tetteroo	Jurgen Appelo / Marco Knauff	
2003	Jaap Boekestein	Martijn Kregting	Jaap Boekestein	Marco Knauff	Auke Pols
2004	Christien Boomsma	Chris Braga	Katrien Rutten	Sarah de Waard	Thomas Olde Heuvelt
2005	Auke Pols	Esther Scherpenisse	Thomas Olde Heuvelt	Sarah de Waard	Mark Bartels
2006	Christien Boomsma	Fred Rabouw	Jan J.B. Kuipers	Claudia van Arkel	Jenny Hoogeboom
2007	Wim Stolk	Anne Witberg	Martijn Lindeboom	Jaap Boekestein	Esther Scherpenisse
2008	Boukje Balder	Fred Rabouw	Rianne Lampers	Anne Witberg	Fred Rabouw
2009	Thomas Olde Heuvelt	Django Mathijsen	Fred van der Meulen	Jos Lexmond	Fred Rabouw
2010	Kurt Forel	Martijn Kregting	Patrick Brannigan	Boukje Balder / Frank Norbert Rieter	
2011	Boukje Balder	Freek de Bruin	Patrick Brannigan	Pieter Van de Walle	Anaïd Haen
2012	Thomas Olde Heuvelt	Linda Mulders	Jürgen Snoeren	Ben Adriaanse	Auke Pols
2013	Esther Scherpenisse	Saskia van Oostenrijk	Peter Kaptein	Olga Ponjee	Fred Rabouw and Johan Zonnenberg
2021	Gerthein Boersma	Jan van Gorkum	Marius van Bruggen		

== See also ==
- Unleash Award
