= Mark Farmer (comics) =

British comic book artist

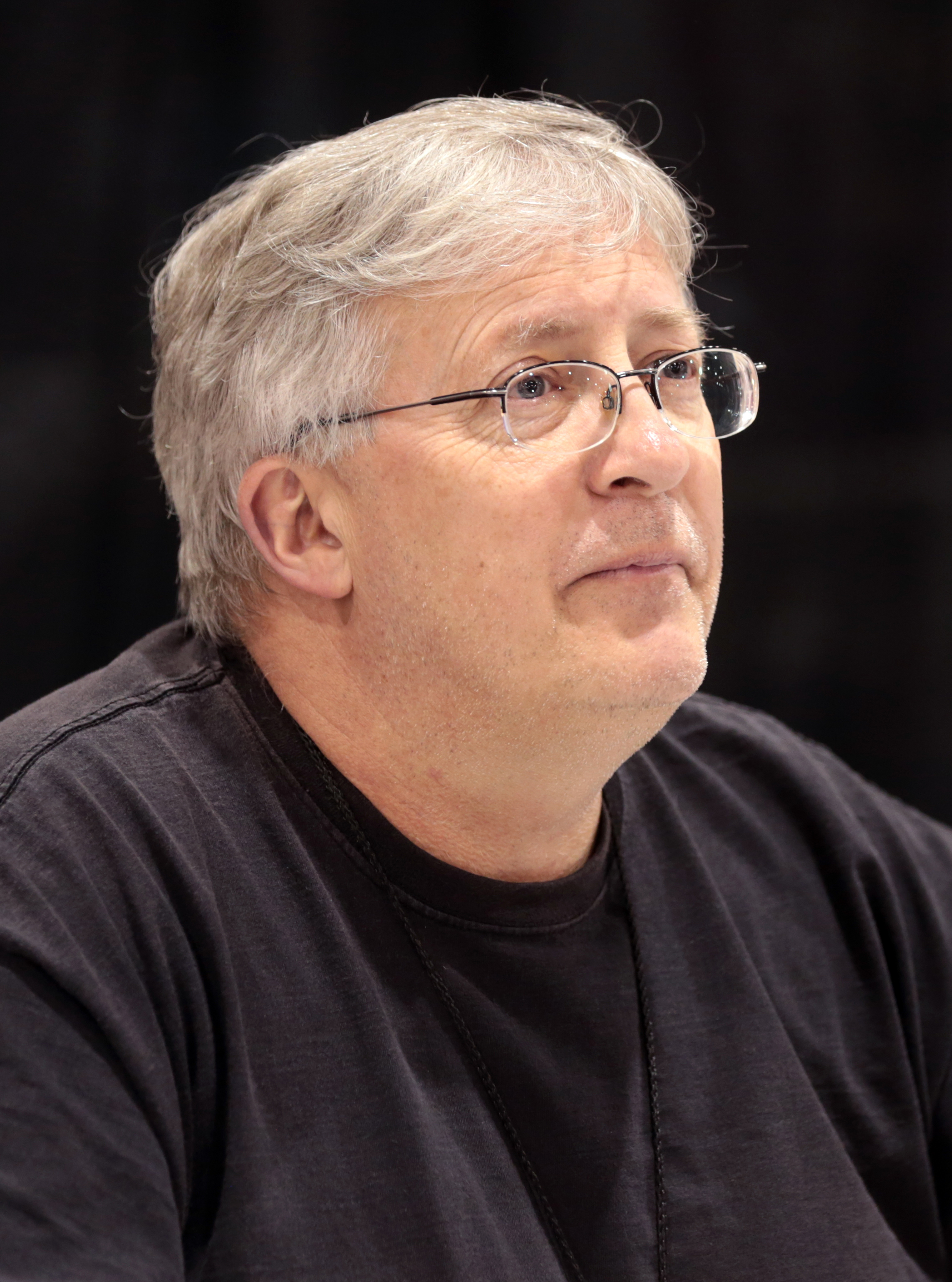
- Farmer at the 2018 Phoenix Comic Fest
- Born: 1957 (age 68–69) Birmingham, England, United Kingdom
- Areas: Penciller, Inker
- Notable works: JLA
- Awards: Eagle Award for Favourite Comic Book Artist (inks) (2000); Inkwell Award for Favorite Inker (2012)

Mark Farmer (born 1957 in Birmingham) is a British comic book artist. He is best known as an inker, often working with Alan Davis.

== Career ==
Farmer got his start in the UK comics industry before becoming part of the British Invasion, the wave of UK creators that were an integral part of the DC Comics "new look" of the 1980s

He is primarily known these days as an inker, although he has done some pencilling as well (for instance, collaborating with writer Len Wein on an early 1980s run on Green Lantern). Like nearly all those involved in the British Invasion, Farmer got his start at the British weekly comic 2000 AD, where he pencilled such series as Judge Dredd and Anderson: Psi Division.

Farmer usually forms a team with writer/penciler Alan Davis. The pair, who first teamed on 1987's D.R. and Quinch for 2000 AD, have worked together on such titles as Marvel Comics' Excalibur, Avengers, Fantastic Four and Uncanny X-Men. For DC their work includes Superman and JLA as well as cover work on Green Lantern. He also helped co-write Gen^{13}: Bootleg.

In 2004, Farmer inked John Byrne's pencils on Superman: True Brit a graphic novel written by former Monty Python member John Cleese and Kim Johnson. It reimagines the origin of Superman, by considering how Clark Kent's upbringing would be different if his spaceship had crashed in England instead of the fictional town of Smallville.

Farmer has also inked other pencillers, such as Dale Keown and Brandon Peterson.

In 2012 Farmer was awarded the Inkwell Award for Favorite Inker.

== Bibliography ==
- Tharg's Future Shocks:
  - "Uncommon Sense" (with Alan Hebden and Mike Collins, in 2000 AD No. 372, 1984)
  - "Letter to Ernie" (with Win Wiacek, in 2000 AD No. 544, 1987)
  - "Bliss" (with Alan McKenzie, in 2000 AD No. 571, 1988)
- Rogue Trooper: "Killothon" (inks, with Pat Mills and pencils by Mike Collins, in Dice Man No. 3, 1986)
- Slaine (with Pat Mills and Mike Collins):
  - "Spoils of Annwn" (in 2000 AD #493–499, 1986)
  - "The Ring of Danu" (in Dice Man No. 4, 1986)
- Judge Dredd:
  - "The Taxidermist" (inks, with John Wagner/Alan Grant and pencils by Cam Kennedy, in 2000 AD #507–510, 1987)
  - "Heatwave" (with John Wagner/Alan Grant and Mike Collins, in 2000 AD Sci-Fi Special 1987)
  - "The Horsemen of the Apocalypse" (with John Wagner/Alan Grant and Mike Collins, in 2000 AD Sci-Fi Special 1987)
  - "The Stunning Stunts Club" (with Alan Grant, in Judge Dredd Annual 1990, 1989)
- D.R. and Quinch: "DR & Quinch's Agony Page" (inks and colours, with Jamie Delano and co-author and pencils by Alan Davis, in 2000 AD #525–534, 1987)
- Action Force: "Old Scores" (with Grant Morrison, in Action Force Monthly, Marvel UK, 1988)
- Anderson: Psi Division (with Alan Grant, in 2000 AD #607–609, 1989)
- Doctor Who (inks, with pencils by Lee Sullivan):
  - "Darkness Falling/Distractions/The Mark of Mandragora" (with Dan Abnett, in Doctor Who Magazine #167–172, 1989)
  - "The Chameleon Factor" (with Paul Cornell, in Doctor Who Magazine No. 174, 1989)
- Excalibur
- Animal Man: Origin of the Species (with Grant Morrison, tpb collects Animal Man #10–17 and Secret Origins No. 39, Vertigo, 2002 ISBN 1-56389-890-X)
- JLA:
  - The Nail (with script and pencils by Alan Davis, 3-issue mini-series, DC Comics, 1998)
  - JLA: Another Nail (with script and pencils by Alan Davis, 3-issue mini-series, DC Comics, 2004)
  - Classified
  - Crisis of Conscience
- The Avengers
- Batman: Year Two: Fear The Reaper
- Nightwing: On the Razor's Edge
- Gen^{13}: Bootleg
- Superboy's Legion (inker and writer; pencils by Alan Davis, 2-issue mini-series, DC Comics, 2001)
- The Legion (2003)
- Superman: True Brit (inks, with John Cleese and Kim Johnson, and pencils by John Byrne, DC Comics Elseworlds, 2004)
- Fantastic Four: The End (inks, written and drawn by Alan Davis, Marvel Comics, 2007)
- ClanDestine #1–5 (inks, written and drawn by Alan Davis, Marvel Comics, 2008, tpb, ClanDestine: Blood Relative Premiere, hardcover, 120 pages, October 2008, ISBN 0-7851-2740-2)

== Awards ==
- 2001 Eagle Award (comics) for Favourite Comic Book Artist (inks)
- 2012 Eagle Award for Favorite Inker
- 2012 Inkwell Award for Favorite Inker

=== Nominations ===
- 1992 Eisner Award for Best Inker, for The Incredible Hulk
- 2000 Eagle Award for Favourite Comic Book Artist: Inks
- 2006 Eagle Award for Favourite Comic Book Artist: Inks
- 2007 Eagle Award for Favourite Comic Book Artist: Inks
