= Alan Davis =

English artist and writer

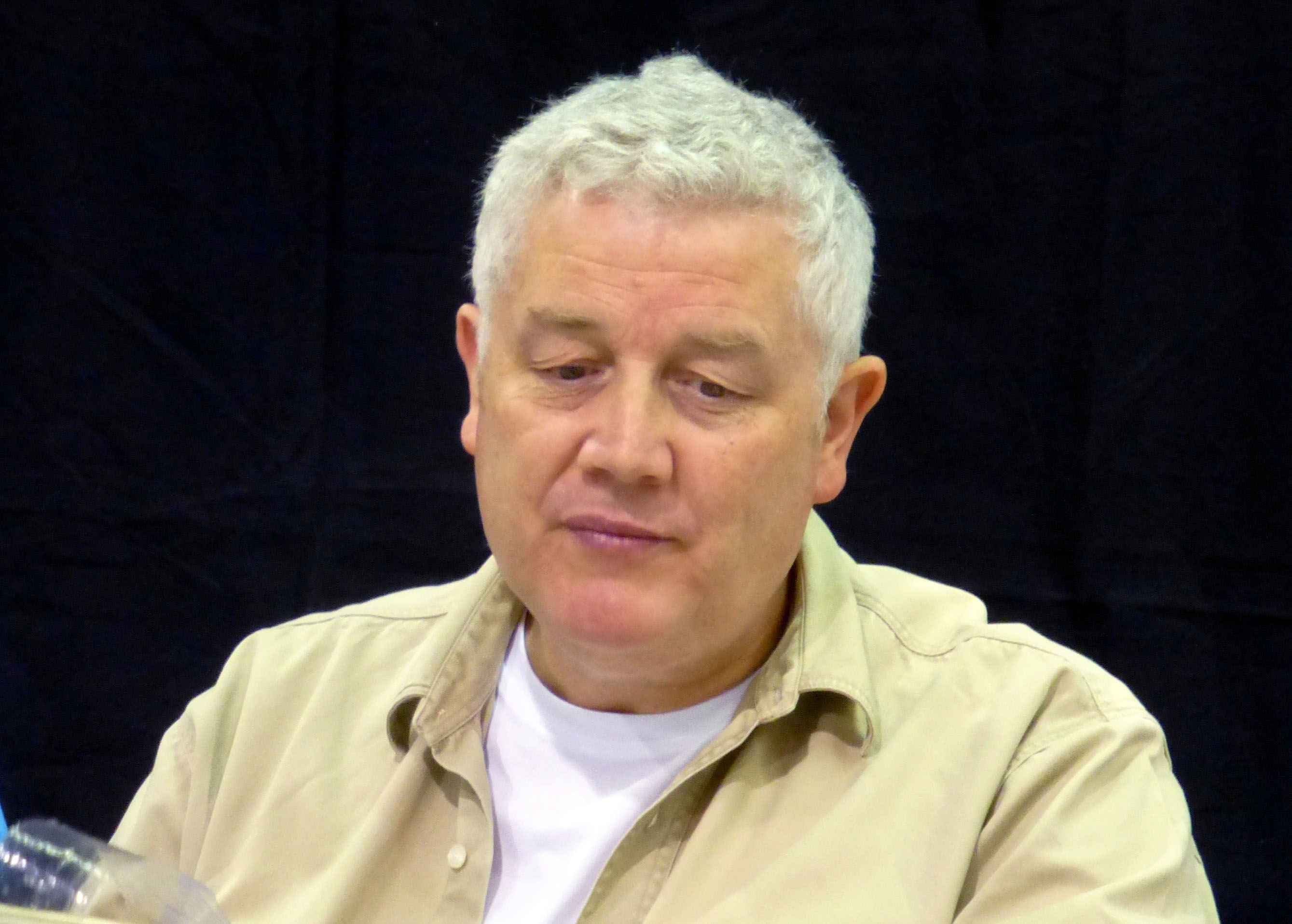
- Davis in the 2013 Chicago Wizard World
- Born: 18 June 1956 (age 70) Corby, England, United Kingdom
- Areas: Writer, Penciller
- Notable works: Captain Britain; ClanDestine; Detective Comics; Excalibur; JLA: The Nail; JLA: Another Nail; Uncanny X-Men
- Awards: "Best Art Team" Eisner Award (1989); Inkpot Award (2011)

Alan Davis (born 18 June 1956) is an English comic book writer and artist, known for his work on Captain Britain, The Uncanny X-Men, ClanDestine, Detective Comics, Excalibur, JLA: The Nail and JLA: Another Nail.

== Career ==
=== UK work ===
Cover of Amazing Heroes #85 (Dec 1985) by Alan Davis

Davis began his career in comics on an English fanzine. His first professional work was a strip called The Crusader in Frantic Magazine for Dez Skinn's revamped Marvel UK line.

Davis's big break was drawing the revamped Captain Britain story in Marvel Superheroes. At the time, he was working full-time in a warehouse in Corby doing work that included loading trucks. He initially had no interest in pursuing a career in comics, as he considered drawing to be a hobby. Due to his inexperience, Davis did not leave enough room for word balloons in the five-page first installment, so it had to be recut to six pages. Afterwards, Alan Moore took over writing duties on Captain Britain. Davis drew 14 issues of the monthly Captain Britain title, which was later reprinted in trade paperback. Davis and Moore formed a close working partnership as creators; they also created D.R. and Quinch for 2000AD. Later, Davis replaced Garry Leach on Marvelman in Warrior and yet again worked with Moore. He also drew the story "Harry Twenty on the High Rock" in 2000AD.

Davis created the illustrations used by the Post Office in their 2019 Marvel commemorative stamp set. The set included ten stamps featuring individual superheroes as well as a miniature sheet.

=== American work ===
In 1985 Davis received his big break in the United States when he was hired by DC Comics to draw Batman and the Outsiders, written by Mike W. Barr. Davis took over from Jim Aparo, who launched the direct market version of the title. His work proved popular enough for him to be assigned artistic duties on DC's flagship title Detective Comics in 1986, again with Barr writing. During the "Batman: Year Two" storyline, however, Davis encountered difficulties with his editor and left after the first issue of the four-issue storyline. The remaining three issues were illustrated by Todd McFarlane. In the story, which featured Joe Chill, the murderer of Batman's parents, Barr wanted Chill to have a large gun. He asked Davis to draw him with a Mauser with an extended barrel, similar to the one used by the Paul Kirk version of Manhunter. However, after Davis rendered Chill with this firearm throughout Detective Comics #575 and on its cover, he obtained copies of the pages for Batman #404 by Frank Miller and David Mazzucchelli, which was scheduled to be released months before the "Year Two" storyline, and saw that Chill was depicted using a smaller handgun without the extended barrel. When asked by editorial to redraw the gun in his artwork, Davis refused. Dick Giordano redrew the gun in the artwork.

Davis accepted an offer by Uncanny X-Men writer Chris Claremont to work on Marvel Comics' X-Men books. With Claremont, Davis drew two New Mutants Annuals and three issues for Uncanny X-Men. In 1987 the duo launched the monthly series Excalibur, which featured a team consisting of Captain Britain and Meggan together with former X-Men members Kitty Pryde, Nightcrawler and Rachel Summers. The stories, set in England, saw appearances by many characters from Moore's and Davis' Captain Britain stories of the early 1980s, including the Crazy Gang and the Technet. Davis' pencils were inked by Paul Neary and, later, Mark Farmer. Davis left with issue 24 due to deadline pressures, but returned with issue 42, this time also as writer. During this second run, according to Davis, "[Editor] Terry Kavanagh spoiled me, gave me near total freedom, and encouraged me to experiment." Among the new characters he created for his second run on the title were Feron, Cerise, Micromax and Kylun.

The ClanDestine, created by Davis for Marvel in 1994

In 1994 Davis created a new series of original characters called the ClanDestine, which featured the Destines, a family of long-lived, magically powered British superhumans. Davis wrote and penciled the title for the first eight issues. He departed after issue 8, and the series was canceled with issue 12. In 1996 Davis wrote and drew the two issue crossover miniseries X-Men and The ClanDestine.

In 1991, Davis reunited with writer Barr to draw the sequel to "Year Two", the one-shot Batman: Full Circle. During much of the 1990s Davis drew many of Marvel and DC Comics major characters and titles, including JLA: The Nail and The Avengers. He was also commissioned to write both main X-Men series in 1999 (providing art for X-Men as well), but he left the following year.

Starting in October 2002 he wrote and drew for Marvel Killraven, a six-issues miniseries revamping the title character of the 1970s. After a return to Uncanny X-Men, working again with Claremont, Davis wrote and drew in 2006–2007 a six-issue Fantastic Four: The End limited series for Marvel (not to be confused with a similar one-shot written by Stan Lee and drawn by John Romita Jr). In February 2008, Davis wrote and pencilled a five-part ClanDestine miniseries and the one-shot Thor: Truth of History for Marvel. Davis most recent work has been in Totally Awesome Hulk (#7–8, 2016), the Thanos Trilogy (2018–2019) and a reunion with Roy Thomas in 2019 for two issues of The Savage Sword of Conan (#10–11, volume 2).

== Personal life ==
Davis and his wife Heather have a son, Thomas, and a daughter, Pauline. Thomas had recently been born when Davis began his work on the Captain Britain stories in 1981, and Pauline was born a few years later.

== Works ==
=== DC Comics ===
- Batman and the Outsiders (then, Adventures of the Outsiders) #22–36 (1985–1986)
- Detective Comics #569–575 (1986–1987)
- Batman: Full Circle, graphic novel (1991)
- Legion of Superheroes vol. 4 #100, Annual #6 (1998)
- JLA: The Nail, miniseries, #1–3 (writer/artist, 1998)
- Superboy's Legion, miniseries, #1–2 (2001)
- Batman: Gotham Knights (Batman Black and White) #25 (2002)
- JLA: Another Nail, miniseries, #1–3 (writer/artist, 2004)

=== Marvel Comics ===
- Astonishing X-Men: Ghost Boxes, miniseries, #1 (2008)
- Avengers vol. 3 #38–43, 63 (2001–2003)
- Avengers: Ultron Forever #1–3 (2015)
- Avengers Prime, miniseries, #1–5 (2010–2011)
- Avengers: The Children's Crusade: Young Avengers (2011)
- Captain America vol. 6 #6–10 (2012)
- Captain America #703 (2018)
- Captain Britain and The Mighty Defenders #1–2 (2015)
- ClanDestine #1–8 (writer/artist, 1994–1995)
- ClanDestine, miniseries, #1–5 (2008)
- Daredevil vol. 3 Annual #1 (2012)
- Dark Reign The List: Uncanny X-Men (2009)
- Excalibur #1–7, 9, 12–17, 23–24, 42–52, 54–58, 61–67 (1988–1993), Special Edition (1987)
- Fantastic Four Annual #33 (2012)
- Fantastic Four: The End, miniseries, #1–6 (writer/artist, 2007)
- Fantastic Four vol. 3 #1–3 (1998)
- Free Comic Book Day: Civil War II (2016)
- Giant-Size X-Men: Nightcrawler #1 (2020)
- Guardians of the Galaxy: Mother Entropy, miniseries #1–5 (2017)
- The Infinity Entity, miniseries, #1–4 (2016)
- Iron Man vol. 3 #64 (2003)
- Killraven, miniseries, #1–6 (writer/artist, 2002)
- Marvel Comics #1000 (2019)
- Marvel Comics Presents (ClanDestine) #158 (1994)
- Marvel Super-Heroes (Black Knight) #4 (1990)
- New Mutants Annual #2–3 (1986–1987)
- Savage Hulk #1–4 (writer/penciller) (2014)
- Savage Sword of Conan vol. 2 #10–11 (2019)
- Secret Invasion: Fantastic Four miniseries, #1A, 2, and 3 of 3 (cover artist) (2008)
- S.H.I.E.L.D. vol. 3 #3 (2015)
- Solo Avengers (She-Hulk) #14 (1989)
- Spider-Man The Official Movie Adaptation (2002)
- Stan Lee Meets Doctor Strange (2006)
- Tarot #1–4 (writer only, 2020)
- Thanos: The Infinity Siblings OGN (2018)
- Thanos: The Infinity Conflict OGN (2018)
- Thanos: The Infinity Ending OGN (2019)
- Thor vol. 2 #58 (2003)
- Mighty Thor #18–21 (2012)
- Thor: Truth of History, one-shot (writer/artist, 2008)
- The Totally Awesome Hulk #7–8 (2016)
- Uncanny X-Men (artist): #213, 215, 444–447, 450–451, 455–459, 462–463, Annual #11 (1987–2004); (writer): #366–380, Annual 1999 (1999–2000)
- Wolverine: Bloodlust, graphic novel (1990)
- Wolverine vol. 4 Annual #1 (writer/artist, 2012)
- Wolverine vol. 5 #1–4, 8–13 (2013–2014)
- X-Men vol. 2 (artist): #85–90, 93–94, 96–98, Annual #9; (writer): #91–92, 95, 99 (1999–2000)
- X-Men: Schism, miniseries, #4 (2011)
- X-Men/ClanDestine, miniseries, #1–2 (1996)
- Young Avengers Presents #6 (2008)

=== Marvel UK ===
- Captain Britain vol. 2 #1–14 (1985–1986)
- The Daredevils (Captain Britain) #1–11 (1983)
- The Empire Strikes Back Monthly #153, 156 (1982)
- Marvel Superheroes (Captain Britain) #377–388 (1981–1982)
- Mighty World of Marvel vol. 2 (Captain Britain) #7–16 (1983–1984)

=== Other publishers ===
- 2000 AD (Harry Twenty on the High Rock) #287–307; (D.R. and Quinch) #317, 350–351, 352–359, 363–367, 509; #525–534 (also co-writer); Judge Dredd #585; No. 322 (1983) (IPC Magazines, 1982–1988)
- 2000 AD Sci-Fi Special (IPC Magazines, 1985)
- Gen13 Bootleg #1–2 (Image Comics, 1996)
- The Maze Agency Special #1 (Innovation Publishing, 1990)
- Miracleman #1–6 (Eclipse Comics, 1985–1986)
- Vampirella #19 (Harris Comics, 2003)
- Warrior (Marvelman) #4, 9–10, 13–16 (Quality Comics, 1982–1983)

=== Collected editions ===
- Avengers Prime, Marvel Comics, 128 pages, hardcover, April 2011, ISBN 0-78514-725-X; trade paperback, October 2011, ISBN 0-78514-726-8
- Avengers: Standoff, includes Avengers (vol. 3) #63, Thor (vol. 2) #58, and Iron Man (vol. 3) #64, hardcover, 120 pages, Marvel Comics, March 2010, ISBN 0-78514-467-6
- Captain Britain Omnibus, collects Marvel Super-Heroes (UK) #377–388, The Daredevils (UK) #1–11, Captain America #305–306, Mighty World of Marvel (UK) #7–16, Captain Britain (UK) #1–14, New Mutants Annual #2, Uncanny X-Men Annual #11, hardcover, August 2009, 688 pages, ISBN 0-7851-3760-2
- Clandestine Classic Premiere, collects ClanDestine #1–8, Marvel Comics Presents #158 and X-Men & ClanDestine #1–2, hardcover, Marvel Comics, 312 pages, February 2008, ISBN 0-7851-2742-9
- ClanDestine: Blood Relative Premiere, hardcover, Marvel Comics, 120 pages, October 2008, ISBN 0-7851-2740-2
- The Complete D.R. & Quinch, trade paperback, 128 pages, 2000 AD, 2010, ISBN 1-90673-588-3
- Excalibur Classic, trade paperback, Marvel Comics, 2005–2007, Volumes 1–4, including Excalibur: The Sword Is Drawn and Excalibur issues drawn by Davis from #1–24. (Vol. 1: ISBN 0-7851-1888-8; Vol. 2: ISBN 0-7851-2201-X; Vol. 3: ISBN 0-7851-2202-8; Vol. 4: ISBN 0-7851-2203-6)
- Excalibur Visionaries: Alan Davis, trade paperback, Marvel Comics, 2009–2011, Volumes 1–3, including Excalibur issues drawn by Davis from #42–67. (Vol. 1: ISBN 0-7851-3740-8; Vol. 2: ISBN 0-7851-4455-2; Vol. 3: ISBN 0-7851-5543-0)
- JLA: The Nail, tpb, 1999, DC, ISBN 1-56389-480-7, Titan, ISBN 1-84023-064-9
- JLA: Another Nail, tpb, 2004, DC, ISBN 1-40120-265-9
- Harry 20: On the High Rock, tpb, 2010, 2000 AD, ISBN 1-90673-591-3
- Killraven, hardcover, June 2007, ISBN 0-7851-2538-8; softcover, December 2008, ISBN 0-7851-1083-6

Preceded by Klaus Janson	Detective Comics artist 1986–1987	Succeeded by Todd McFarlane
Preceded by Scott Lobdell	Excalibur writer 1991–1993	Succeeded by Scott Lobdell
Preceded by Steve Seagle	Uncanny X-Men writer 1999–2000	Succeeded by Chris Claremont
Preceded by Joe Kelly	X-Men (vol. 2) writer 1999–2000	Succeeded by Chris Claremont
