= Hexes =

Hexes is the plural of Hex.

Hexes may also refer to:

- Hexes, a book by Tom Piccirilli, 1999 nominee for the Bram Stoker Award for Best Novel.
- Hexes (climbing), items of rock climbing equipment used to protect climbers from injury during a fall
- Hexes and Ohs, a Canadian electronic indie pop group from Montreal
- Hexes for Exes, a 2007 album by Moving Units, their third release
- Strange Hexes, the second album released by Imaad Wasif
