= Gerben Hellinga Jr =

Dutch writer (1938–2024)

Gerben Hellinga Jr. (12 December 1938 – 15 October 2024, real name Gerben Graddesz Hellinga) was a Dutch author of science fiction and historical novels.

Hellinga was born in Zaltbommel, the Netherlands. He studied medicine and graduated as a psychiatrist in 1975. In 1985 he won the King Kong Award (now known as the Paul Harland Prize). In 1986 his first novel was published, entitled Coriolis, de stormplaneet—a science fiction novel.

Hellinga died in Deventer, the Netherlands, in 2024.
