= Pony Island =

2016 video game

- Steam logo
- Developer: Daniel Mullins Games
- Publisher: Daniel Mullins Games
- Designers: Daniel Mullins; Simon Jenkins
- Artist: Daniel Mullins
- Writer: Daniel Mullins
- Composer: Jonah Senzel
- Engine: Unity
- Platforms: Windows, OS X, Linux
- Release: WW: January 4, 2016
- Genre: Action-adventure
- Mode: Single-player

Pony Island is a 2016 metafictional action-adventure video game developed and published by Canadian indie developer Daniel Mullins. The game has the player interact with what appears to be an old arcade cabinet game called "Pony Island". The player soon discovers the game was crafted by Lucifer himself, who is trying to claim their soul. The player is aided by the soul of a previous player who helps them access Pony Island's internal programming to get around the traps left by Lucifer and save not only his soul, but the many tormented souls that are trapped within the game's code.

== Gameplay ==
Pony Island is primarily a point-and-click style adventure game, but it often breaks genre conventions with sections that might resemble shooter games and puzzle games. It also employs metanarrative, with a protagonist playing an old arcade game while being controlled by an actual human player.

During the gameplay, the protagonist must play the fictional game made by Lucifer, Pony Island, and overcome its various challenges in order to find and delete three demonic entities who are between them and freedom.

A significant portion of the playtime consists of an auto-runner game with shoot 'em up elements. The player must guide a pony character through a grassy valley while avoiding obstacles and shooting enemies that might attack it.

There's also sections when the player has to solve interactive, real-time puzzles in order to advance. These riddles are presented as simplified pseudocode alongside commands such as "move down" and "repeat". When the player manages to order all elements the right way, the "program will execute" and the narrative will continue. In-game, these instances are considered either bypassing glitches or "cheating".

== Plot ==
The protagonist is a human named Theodore, a 13th-century crusader who was sent to Limbo after his death at Jerusalem's wall.

He is led to play what seems like an old arcade game called Pony Island. It is revealed the game was created by Lucifer, who wants the protagonist to surrender his soul.

He is eventually contacted via an instant messenger program by Hopeless Soul. They instruct the protagonist to delete three core files (guarded by demonic entities Azazel, Beelzebub and Asmodeus). By doing so, Theodore is able to set the trapped souls free.

At the end, Hopeless Soul talks directly to the player and asks them to delete the game file.

== Development ==
In 2014, Daniel Mullins attempted to obtain funding for a game called Catch Monsters through Kickstarter, which ultimately failed. Pony Island's original prototype was primarily developed during the 2014 Ludum Dare game jam, in which the theme was "Entire Game On One Screen". The game was later featured in Zoe Quinn's top 10 games of 2014.

Inspired by the positive reception, Mullins started working on a full commercial release for the game during his spare time. It passed through Steam Greenlight and was subsequently published on January 4, 2016.

Mullins wanted to create a game that defied players' expectations from standard game interfaces by "flipping them upside down". Mullins had been intrigued with games that are "dark and mysterious", but also wanted to create something that felt like it was not meant to be played. Part of this last goal was accomplished by minimizing the amount of instruction that the game provided, particularly once the player began to reveal the internal code workings, but Mullins built these systems on familiar interfaces so that the player would have an intuitive sense on what to do. For example, in the pseudo-code sections of the game, he found that adding iconography for locks and keys for the commands the players could manipulate helped them to understand how to interact with the code without direct instruction. At the same time, Mullins wrote the language of the pseudocode to make the programming commands seem ominous so as to make the player feel like they were "toying with a system that [one] may not fully understand". Mullins also built in fake error screens and messages through the Steam software that appeared to come from the player's friends, to further the unease that he wanted the players to feel while playing the game.

Mullins attributed part of the game's success to popular streamer PewDiePie, who asked Mullins if he could post a Let's Play of Pony Island.

== Reception ==
Reception

Aggregate score
Aggregator	Score
Metacritic	86/100

Review scores
Publication	Score
Destructoid	9.5/10
IGN	9.0/10
PC Gamer (US)	91/100
Hardcore Gamer	4.5/5

Pony Island has generally been well received by critics, who praised it for being a metafiction on the nature of video games. The game holds an aggregated score of 86/100 on Metacritic based on 29 critic reviews. IGN awarded it a score of 9.0 out of 10, saying "Pony Island is a punk rock experiment in storytelling and game design that delights in toying with the player." Lizzy Finnegan of The Escapist compared the experience of playing Pony Island to what it might have been like playing Polybius, an urban legend of a video game cabinet used for mind control experiments, and described it as "psychological horror done so incredibly right".

Luke George, writing for Hardcore Gamer, called Pony Island a "hard game to describe". He praised its balanced puzzles, while acknowledging they get "a little bit tiresome by the end". George also drew attention to the 8-bit-style sound design and was delighted at the game's visuals, commenting that both of these elements help enhance the game's themes and atmosphere.

== Sequel ==
A sequel, Pony Island 2: Panda Circus, was announced at The Game Awards 2023, initially without a proper release date. It was later scheduled for April 27, 2027. Mullins describes the game as having a number of disparate gameplay sections, more comparable to The Hex and Inscryption, Mullins' games that followed after Pony Island, but connected by the "hacking" puzzle theme from the original Pony Island game. In Pony Island 2, the player controls a slain warrior that is tormented by King Yan, the Chinese god of death, while traversing through various video game landscapes. It will include live-action performances by SungWon Cho (as King Yan), Arian Moayed, Caitlin Reilly, and Kevin Saxby.
