= Hexed =

Hexed may refer to:

- Hexed (1993 film), a 1993 romantic comedy film
- Hexed (2026 film), a 2026 animated fantasy film produced by Walt Disney Animation Studios
- Hexed (album) by Children of Bodom
- Hexed (novel) by Kevin Hearne
- "Hexed", an episode from the fifth season of the TV series Medical Center
- "Hexed", an episode from the fifth season of the TV series Swamp People

== See also ==
- Hex (disambiguation)
