= D.R. & Quinch =

- Cover to The Complete D.R. & Quinch, 2006 featuring the title characters. Art by Alan Davis.
- Created by: Alan Moore; Alan Davis

Publication information
- Publisher: Originally IPC Media (Fleetway) until 1999, thereafter Rebellion Developments
- Schedule: Weekly
Title(s)
2000 AD
- Genre: Science fiction
- Publication date: May 1983 – August 1987

Creative team
- Writer(s): Alan Moore; Jamie Delano
- Artist(s): Alan Davis
- Letterer(s): Steve Potter
- Editor(s): Tharg (Steve MacManus)

D.R. & Quinch is a comic strip about two delinquent alien drop-outs. It was created by Alan Moore and Alan Davis for the British weekly comics anthology 2000 AD. It first appeared in 1983. The strip was the tale of how two alien teenage students Waldo "D.R." Dobbs, a scheming criminal mastermind, and Ernest Errol Quinch, his muscular purple-skinned and simple-minded companion in crime, have influenced Earth's history in various anarchic ways.

== Publication history ==
=== Creation and concept ===
D.R. and Quinch began in 2000 AD as a one-off comic in the Time Twisters series titled "D.R. and Quinch Have Fun On Earth". The characters were initially meant to only appear once but they proved so popular that they were given their own semi-regular series.

D.R. and Quinch were inspired by the National Lampoon characters O.C. and Stiggs. The film Animal House has also been cited as an influence. Alan Davis took visual inspiration from the cartoon style of Leo Baxendale’s Grimly Feendish. Alan Moore has described D.R. & Quinch as belonging to the tradition of British teenage delinquency comics, comparable to Dennis the Menace except with "a thermonuclear capacity".

=== Later appearances ===
The pair's last storyline, "D.R. and Quinch Go to Hollywood", ran from progs 363 to 367 and is considered to be Moore and Davis's finest D.R. and Quinch story. However, at the time, the Moore/Davis partnership was undergoing strain due to Moore refusing permission for their Captain Britain work to be reprinted. The pair's last D.R. and Quinch work together was in the 2000 AD Sci-Fi Special in 1985.

D.R. and Quinch continued to appear in 2000 AD from progs 525 to 534 in the form of an advice column with readers sending in letters with personal problems solved by D.R. and Quinch in their own way. One such column was "hijacked" by D.R.'s girlfriend Crazy Chrissy. These later episodes were written by Jamie Delano.

In 1986 Titan Books released a collection of all D.R. and Quinch stories from 2000 AD called D.R. and Quinch's Totally Awesome Guide To Life. It became one of Titan's best selling books in their 2000 AD reprints. The book went out of print several times and it has since been collected as The Complete D.R. and Quinch (ISBN 1-84023-345-1) in 2001.

During the 2001 Judge Dredd cross-dimensional "Helter Skelter" storyline, D.R. & Quinch are among the many cameo characters taken from other 2000 AD strips, appearing in prog 1256. Kenzie uses their appearance as an example of the collapsing realities getting worse.

In 2018, INDIO comics released a story, "D.R. & Quinch Hijack Free Comic Book Day", which was part of a "2000 AD Regened" all-ages comic created for Free Comic Book Day. The strip was created by Owen Michael Johnson and Colin Bell.

== Characters ==
- Waldo "D.R." Dobbs — scheming criminal mastermind
- Ernest Errol Quinch — D.R.'s muscular and simple-minded purple-skinned companion
- Crazy Chrissy — D.R.'s girlfriend, formerly known as Chrysoprasia, or Chirpy to her friends
- Pulger — paranoid veteran of the Ghoyogi slime jungle wars

== Reception ==
D.R. & Quinch's anarchic humour was popular with its original audiences — the feature won the 1985 Eagle Award (for comics published in 1984) for Character Most Worthy of Own Title; and the supporting characters Pulger and Chrysoprasia were both nominated for Favourite Supporting Character. In addition, the first collection of stories, D.R. & Quinch's Totally Awesome Guide to Life, won the 1987 Eagle Award for Favourite Comic Album.

The series has had a strong reputation since it was first published. It stands out as something so obviously different when compared to the rest of Moore’s body of work that it is worthy of attention. It has been called the "absurd, cartoony, delightfully vicious other side of Halo Jones". Writing for Time, Douglas Wolk described it as, for the majority of its run, "one of the funniest comics ever" and Neil Gaiman has credited it with being one of the greatest 2000 AD stories.

In a later interview, however, co-creator Moore expressed discomfort with how the series exploits violence for comic effect, claiming that it has no "lasting or redeeming social value".

== Bibliography ==
- "Time Twisters: D.R. and Quinch Have Fun On Earth" (written by Alan Moore, art by Alan Davis, in 2000AD #317, 1983)
- "D.R. and Quinch Go Straight" (by Moore & Davis, in 2000AD #350-351, 1984)
- "D.R. and Quinch Go Girl Crazy" (by Moore & Davis, in 2000AD #352-354, 1984)
- "D.R. and Quinch Get Drafted" (by Moore & Davis, in 2000AD #355-359, 1984)
- "D.R. and Quinch Go to Hollywood" (by Moore & Davis, in 2000AD #363-367, 1984)
- "D.R. and Quinch Get Back to Nature" (by Moore & Davis, in 2000AD Sci-Fi Special 1985)
- "D.R. & Quinch's Incredibly Excruciating Agony Page" (written by Jamie Delano and Alan Davis, art by Davis, inks: Mark Farmer, in 2000 AD #525-534, 1987)
- "D.R. & Quinch Hijack Free Comic Book Day" (written by Owen Johnson & Colin Bell, art by Indio! & Dom Regan, in 2000 AD Regened: Free Comic Book Day, 2018)

=== Collected editions ===
There have been three trade paperbacks:

- D.R. and Quinch's Totally Awesome Guide To Life (Titan, 1986 ISBN 0-907610-69-2) which contains only the Moore/Davis stories in original black and white
- The Complete D.R. and Quinch (Titan, 2001 ISBN 1-84023-345-1 Rebellion Developments, 2006 ISBN 1-904265-48-0) which contains all of the above stories (up to 1987) in original black and white
- D.R. and Quinch - Definitive Edition (Fleetway, 1991 ISBN 1-85386-255-X) which contains only the Moore/Davis stories in color
- The Complete D.R. & Quinch (2006, Rebellion, ISBN 1904265480)
