= Hexing (disambiguation) =

Hexing is an extinct genus of basal ornithomimosaur dinosaur known from the Early Cretaceous of northeastern China.

Hexing may also refer to:

- Hexing, the act of making a curse or supposed real and potentially supernaturally realized malicious wish
- Hexing railway station, a railway station on the Taiwan Railways Administration Neiwan Line
- Hexing Village (何兴村), Jingdong, Jiangxi Province, China
- Hexing Village (禾兴村), Heqing, Lengshuijiang, Hunan Province, China
- Hexing Village (和兴村), Renhe Subdistrict, Gaotang County, Liaocheng, Shandong Province, China
- Hexing Village (和興村), Zhongpu, Chiayi County, Taiwan
- Hexing Village (和興村), Hukou, Hsinchu County, Taiwan
- Hexing Village (和興村), Zhongliao, Nantou County, Taiwan
- Hexing Village (合興里), Toucheng, Yilan County, Taiwan
- Hexing Village (和興里), Zhonghe District, New Taipei, Taiwan
- Hexing Village (和興里), Fongshan District, Kaohsiung, Taiwan
- Hexing Village (和興里), Pingtung City, Pingtung County, Taiwan

== See also ==
- Hex (disambiguation)
