= Paul Harland =

Dutch writer (1960–2003)

- Born: Paul Smit; 15 April 1960; Noordwijk
- Died: 17 June 2003 (aged 43); Tiel
- Cause of death: Asphyxiation
- Occupation: Writer

Paul Harland (15 April 1960 – 17 June 2003) was the pseudonym of the Dutch science fiction writer Paul Smit. He wrote several novels, one in English, and one of his collections was translated into English. Along with his writing he also designed furniture.

== Death ==
His death had initially been reported as a suicide. Later his husband, Bosnian architect Tarik Dreca, was convicted for his murder. Tarik had apparently staged the death to make it look like a suicide. Tarik's defense attorney theorized that Harland had recreated a plot from his book The Hand That Takes, which has a man commit suicide and set up his partner, but the court rejected the idea. In 2006 Tarik was sentenced to twelve years for the murder.

== Awards ==
Four times, Harland won the King Kong Award, the major Dutch award for short science fiction, fantasy or horror stories, for "Fuga in frictieloos porcelein" (1984), "De wintertuin" (1990), "Retrometheus" (1992), and "Onkruid en stenen" (1995). After his death the King Kong Award was renamed the Paul Harland Prize in his honor.

== Bibliography ==
- Novels
  - De val van Nieuw Versailles (Stichting Fantastische Vertellingen, 1983)
  - De bleke schaduw van de vrouwe (with Tais Teng) (Stichting Fantastische Vertellingen, 1988)
  - Water tot ijs (Babel, 1994) ISBN 90-73730-19-8
  - Systems of Romance (with Paul Evenblij) (Babel, 1995) ISBN 90-73730-27-9
  - Computercode Cthulhu (with Tais Teng) (Babel - One Door Publications, 2005) ISBN 90-73730-49-X
  - The Hand That Takes (Aeon Press, 2002) ISBN 0-9534784-2-4
- Collections of short stories
  - Remote Control (Babel, 1993) ISBN 90-73730-05-8
  - De werelden van Vince-Crux (Babel - One Door Publications, 2005) ISBN 90-73730-51-1
- Another 15 unbundled stories, published between 1980 and 1998
