= Paul Evenblij =

Dutch author of speculative fiction

Paul Evenblij is a Dutch author of speculative fiction. He has won the Paul Harland Prize for his short stories in both 1988 and 2001. An English language collection of stories, Systems of Romance, he wrote in conjunction with Paul Harland was published in 1995. After publishing several other stories he went on to write his first (Dutch language) novel De Scrypturist in 2009 under the pseudonym Paul Evanby to great critical acclaim. It is the first part in a series named 'Het Levend Zwart' ("The Living Black"). The novel has been described as 'steampunk without steam engines'. A second part in the series, De Vloedvormer, was released in 2010. These novels describe a fictional historical society where scribes knowledgeable in a special magical script escape from and alter their dystopian society by creating an alternate reality that bears resemblances to both William Gibson's "cyberspace" and William Burroughs' "Interzone". Neither of these novels have been translated into English.

== Trivia ==
A free Scrypturist-app has been released for the iPhone and iPad, which includes a city plan of Weltryck, extra information about Ristryck and a glossary.

== Bibliography ==
- Systems of Romance (1995) [English language collection of short stories, as Paul Evenblij with Paul Harland]
- Gödel slam (2003) [Dutch language collection of short stories, as Paul Evenblij]
- Manneken (2009) [Dutch language short story, as Paul Evenblij]
- De Scrypturist (2009) [Dutch language novel, as Paul Evanby]
- De Vloedvormer (2010) [Dutch language novel, as Paul Evanby]
