= JLA: The Nail series =

Three-issue comic book mini-series

JLA: The Nail
- Cover for JLA: The Nail #1 (Aug. 1998), by Alan Davis

Publication information
- Publisher: Elseworlds (DC Comics)
- Schedule: Monthly
- Format: Limited series
- Genre: Superhero
- Publication date: August – October 1998
- No. of issues: 3
- Main character(s): Aquaman; Atom; Batman; Flash; Green Lantern; Hawkwoman; Martian Manhunter; Wonder Woman

Creative team
- Created by: Alan Davis; Mark Farmer

Collected editions
- JLA: The Nail (US edition): ISBN 1563894807
- JLA: The Nail (UK Edition): ISBN 1840230649

JLA: The Nail is a three-issue American comic book miniseries published by DC Comics in 1998 under its Elseworlds imprint. The story, written and drawn by Alan Davis, is set in a parallel universe where Jonathan and Martha Kent's truck experiences a flat tire caused by a nail, which stops them from discovering a Kryptonian spaceship outside Smallville containing the baby Kal-El, negating Superman. It was later followed by a sequel, JLA: Another Nail, a three-issue mini-series published in 2004 which wrapped up several loose ends from the original mini-series, such as the war between the New Gods and the Green Lantern Corps and Oliver Queen's public betrayal of the Justice League.

The story's theme is set in the first paragraph:

For want of a nail the shoe was lost,
for want of a shoe the horse was lost,
for want of a horse the knight was lost,
for want of a knight the battle was lost.
So it was a kingdom was lost – all for want of a nail.

== Plot ==
=== The Nail ===
Twenty-four years ago, farmers Jonathan and Martha Kent experience a flat tire on their truck caused by a nail, which stops them from discovering a Kryptonian spaceship containing the baby Kal-El. In the present day, the Justice League consists of Batman, Wonder Woman, Aquaman, the Flash, Hawkwoman, the Atom, Martian Manhunter and Green Lantern.

Journalist Perry White conducts an anti-metahuman propaganda campaign, supported by mayor of Metropolis Lex Luthor and deputy mayor Jimmy Olsen. After a battle with Amazo which resulted in the death of Hawkman, Oliver Queen (Green Arrow) became a bitter paraplegic and conspiracy theorist, claiming that the Justice League are plotting against humanity. Metahumans are eliminated or captured one by one: first the supervillains and then teams such as the Doom Patrol and the Outsiders.

The Joker liberates the prisoners in Arkham Asylum with energy-generating gauntlets which he uses to trap Batman and kill Robin and Batgirl. Catwoman attacks the Joker and frees Batman, who damages the Joker's gauntlets and snaps his neck on live television as Arkham explodes. Batman retreats to the Batcave with Catwoman while the Joker's murder tarnishes the Justice League's reputation.

Metamorpho is brainwashed into killing the Thinker and Perry White and dies while trying to tell Martian Manhunter what happened. Green Lantern encounters the orbiting corpse of Adam Strange and discovers a force field around Earth that prevents anything from leaving the planet. The Flash saves Ra's al Ghul and the League of Assassins from an attack by Amazo while seeking the mastermind behind the events.

Wonder Woman is framed for the destruction of the White House. Riots erupt soon afterwards and Luthor takes control of the United States, using flying masked robots called the Liberators to enforce the law. The members of the Justice League are captured by the Liberators (who are shown to be Bizarro-like clones of Kal-El) until Batman, the Flash and the Atom are left.

Lois Lane, a journalist investigating the anti-metahuman propaganda campaign, suspects a conspiracy. At a metahuman research facility, Lois meets Dr. Lana Lang, who sends her to Smallville where the Kents help shelter escaped metahumans. Returning to Metropolis and discovering Luthor in an unresponsive fugue state, Lois confronts Jimmy, who reveals that LexCorp discovered Kal-El's empty spaceship and found traces of his DNA within it. Luthor used the alien DNA to create Bizarro clones and turn Jimmy into a Kryptonian-human hybrid. Metahumans have been imprisoned and harvested for their DNA in order to convert humans into Kryptonians and create a Kryptonian society ruled by Jimmy.

Batman, Batwoman (formerly Catwoman), the Atom, and the Flash free the captive Justice League members and destroy the Liberators, only to be confronted by a super-powered Jimmy. Jimmy defeats the League due to their inexperience with Kryptonian powers as the fight spreads to an Amish community. As Jimmy is about to kill Batman, he is stopped by a farmer who tries to reason with him; Jimmy unsuccessfully tries to incinerate the farmer with his heat vision.

The farmer is revealed to be Kal-El, who was found as a baby by an Amish couple and raised as their son. Jimmy attempts to persuade Kal to join him while his adoptive parents try to dissuade him from getting involved in worldly affairs, but Kal refuses both of them, unable to ignore his conscience with Batman urging him to stop Jimmy. Jimmy then kills Kal's adoptive parents in front of him with his heat vision and engages Kal in a fight. Despite the two of them being evenly matched, the stress of the fight causes Jimmy's DNA graft to fail and his body to disintegrate. With Jimmy and the Liberators defeated, the Justice League (without Batman, who resigns from the League after he is acquitted of the Joker's murder) regains public confidence with the help of its newest member: Superman.

=== Another Nail ===
JLA: Another Nail
- Cover for JLA: Another Nail #1 (May 2004), by Alan Davis

Publication information
- Publisher: Elseworlds (DC Comics)
- Schedule: Monthly
- Format: Limited series
- Genre: Superhero
- Publication date: May – July 2004
- Main character(s): Aquaman; Atom; Batman; Flash; Green Arrow; Green Lantern; Hawkgirl; Martian Manhunter; Superman; Wonder Woman

Creative team
- Created by: Alan Davis; Mark Farmer
- Written by: Alan Davis
- Penciller: Alan Davis
- Inker: Mark Farmer
- Colorist: John Kalisz

Collected editions
- JLA: Another Nail (US edition): ISBN 1401202659
- JLA: Another Nail (UK Edition): ISBN 1840239441

A year earlier, Apokolips goes to war with New Genesis, and the Green Lantern Corps is dispatched to stem the loss of life. One Green Lantern is killed, and her power ring selects Big Barda as its new host. Barda and Mister Miracle manage to reverse the effects of a device designed to vaporize all matter within millions of light years, causing Darkseid to disintegrate into nothingness and be scattered across the universe instead. Hal Jordan (Green Lantern) reveals to the Justice League that the Central Power Battery on Oa is weakening. Oliver Queen (Green Arrow) is dying from injuries caused by Amazo in the same fight that killed Hawkman.

Kal-El is adjusting to his new life as Superman, devoting himself full-time to heroics with little rest. During a mission in Peru with the Martian Manhunter, Superman's strength begins to fade as he tries to save a village from an attack by Despero and Evil Star. Kal takes a sabbatical and bonds with Jonathan and Martha Kent, as well as Lois Lane, as they create a new secret identity for him.

The members of the Justice League investigate various disturbances in spacetime. Batman, who continues to fight crime separately from the League along with Batwoman (formerly Catwoman), encounters Deadman, who reveals that demons are escaping Hell and invading Earth. Batman is then attacked by a demonically-powered Joker.

Using the resources of New Genesis and the Green Lantern Corps, Barda and Mr. Miracle discover that the disturbances are coming from the Limbo Cell, an organism that feeds on all matter and energy. Superman attempts to fly a bomb into the cell's nucleus, but is left helpless when the cell absorbs his energy. As he is about to die, Superman is rescued and revitalized by Amazo, now equipped with Oliver Queen's brain. Queen sacrifices his life to detonate the bomb in the cell's nucleus. With the Limbo Cell destroyed, reality heals and the disturbances in space and time are repaired.

The Joker attempts to drag Batman with him to Hell, but an unseen force suddenly intervenes; Joker is sent into eternal punishment while the spirits of Batgirl and Robin rescue Batman and return him to Earth. Putting the past behind him, Batman formally rejoins the Justice League.

== Collected editions ==
The three issues of JLA: The Nail were collected into a trade paperback in 1998 by DC Comics and 1999 by Titan Books. The three issues of JLA: Another Nail were collected into a trade paperback in 2005 by DC Comics and Titan Books.

In October 2017, DC Comics released JLA: The Nail/Another Nail: Deluxe Edition, which reprinted both miniseries in one book.

== Awards ==
In 1999, JLA: The Nail was nominated for an Eisner Award for Best Limited Series.

== See also ==
- Bullet Points (comics)
- Butterfly effect
- Camel's nose
