= Thomas Olde Heuvelt =

Dutch writer (born 1983)

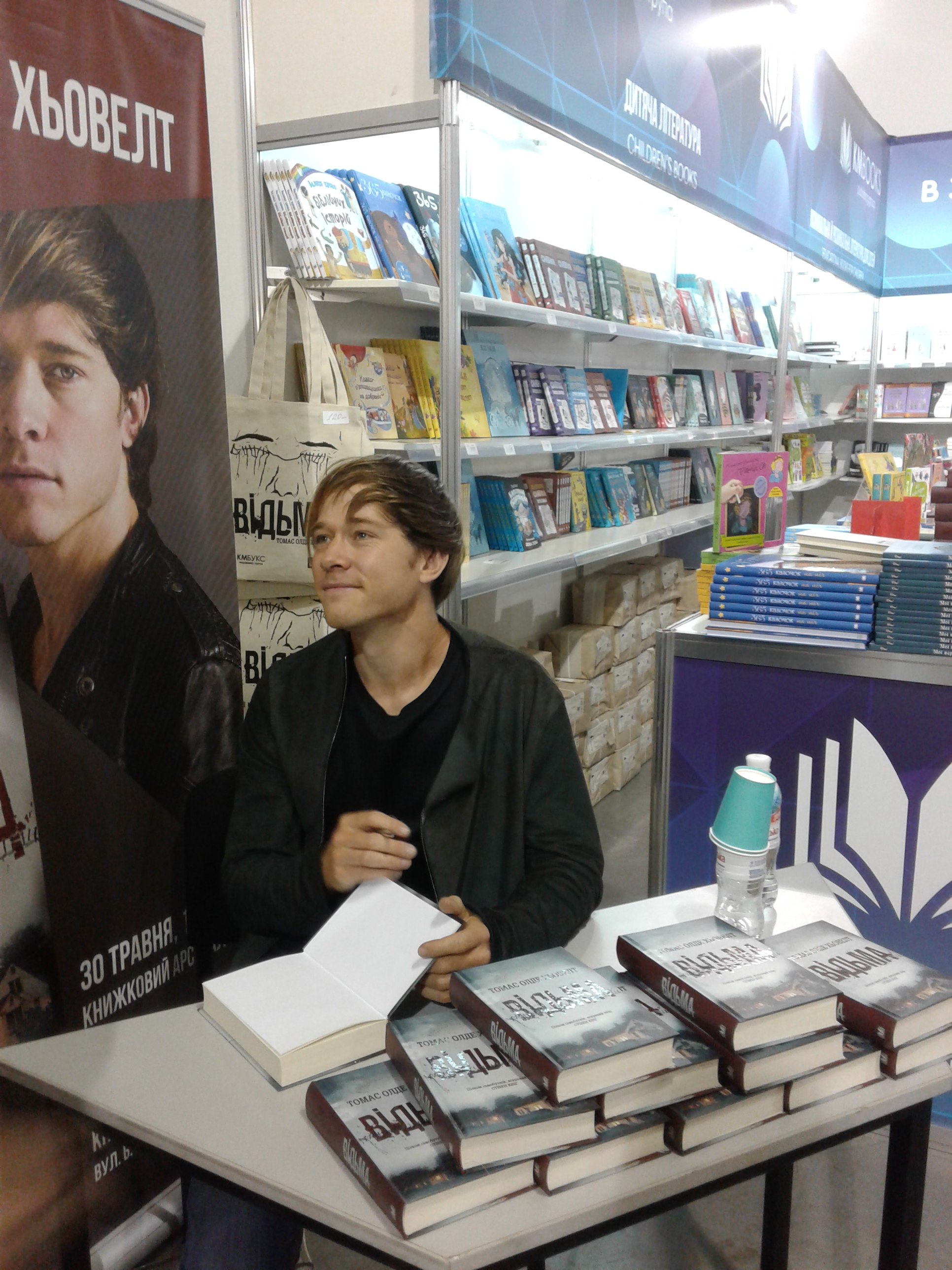
- Olde Heuvelt in 2018
- Born: 16 April 1983 (age 43); Nijmegen, Netherlands
- Occupation: Writer
- Writing career
- Genres: Magic realism; horror; fantasy
- Notable work: HEX
- Website: oldeheuvelt.com

Thomas Olde Heuvelt (born 16 April 1983) is a Dutch horror writer. His short stories have received the Hugo Award for Best Novelette and the Paul Harland Prize, and they have been nominated for two additional Hugo Awards and a World Fantasy Award.

== Early life and influences ==
Olde Heuvelt was born in Nijmegen, Netherlands. He studied English and American literature at Radboud University Nijmegen and at the University of Ottawa in Canada, where he lived for half a year. The literary heroes of his childhood were Roald Dahl and Stephen King, who created in him a love for grim and dark fiction. He later discovered the works of a wider range of contemporary writers, such as Jonathan Safran Foer, Neil Gaiman, and Yann Martel.

== Career ==
Olde Heuvelt wrote his debut novel, De Onvoorziene, at the age of 19. It was published with a small printing in 2002 and followed in 2004 by PhantasAmnesia, a 600-page novel in which he combines horror with humor and satire. Since 2008, his novels have been published by the Dutch publishing house Luitingh-Sijthoff.

Olde Heuvelt is a two-time winner of the Paul Harland Prize for best Dutch work of speculative fiction (2009 and 2012). Translated into English, his short story "The Boy Who Cast No Shadow", published by PS Publishing in the UK, was nominated for the Science Fiction & Fantasy Translation Awards in 2012. The same story was nominated for the Hugo Award for Best Novelette in 2013.

In April 2013, Tor Books released his story "The Ink Readers of Doi Saket" as an e-book. It was nominated for the Hugo Award for Best Short Story and the World Fantasy Award—Short Fiction in 2014. His 2013 story "The Day the World Turned Upside Down", published in Lightspeed, won the Hugo Award for Best Novelette in 2015.

In 2016, Olde Heuvelt's novel HEX was published in the US by Tor and in the UK and Australia by Hodder & Stoughton. Stephen King tweeted about the book, calling it "totally, brilliantly original". This was followed by a book tour through the US.

Heuvelt's next English-language book, Echo, was published by Tor in February 2022. His next Dutch work after that was Orakel (2024).

== Honors ==
- 2009 Paul Harland Prize (winner) for "De jongen die geen schaduw wierp"
- 2012 Paul Harland Prize (winner) for De vis in de fles
- 2012 Science Fiction & Fantasy Translation Award—Short Form (honorable mention, together with Carlos Ruiz Zafón) for "The Boy Who Cast No Shadow", translated by Laura Vroomen
- 2013 Hugo Award for Best Novelette (nomination) for "The Boy Who Cast No Shadow"
- 2014 Hugo Award for Best Short Story (nomination) for "The Ink Readers of Doi Saket"
- 2014 World Fantasy Award—Short Fiction (nomination) for "The Ink Readers of Doi Saket"
- 2015 Hugo Award for Best Novelette (winner) for "The Day the World Turned Upside Down", translated by Lia Belt

== Publications ==
=== Novels ===
- De Onvoorziene (Intes International) (2002)
- PhantasAmnesia (Intes International) (2004)
- Leerling Tovenaar Vader & Zoon (Luitingh-Sijthoff) (2008)
- Harten Sara (Luitingh-Sijthoff) (2011)
- HEX (Hodder & Stoughton, UK; Tor Books, US) (2016)
- Echo (Luitingh-Sijthoff) (2019)
- Oracle (Tor Books) (2024)
- Darker Days (Bantam Books) (2025)

=== Short story collections ===
- Om nooit te vergeten (Luitingh-Sijthoff) (2017)

=== Short stories ===
- "De Bank en het sterrenlicht" (2006)
- "De Koperen Krokodil" (Pure Fantasy) (2006)
- "Tulpen en windmolens in het Land van de Champignons" (2006)
- "De Kronieken van een Weduwnaar" (2008)
- "Harlequin on Dam Square" (Oxygen Books) (2010)
- "Alles van Waarde is Weerloos" (2010)
- "Balora met het grote hoofd" (Fantastisch Strijdtoneel III, ed. Alex de Jong) (2012)
- "The Boy Who Cast No Shadow" (PS Publishing, UK) (2012)
- "The Ink Readers of Doi Saket" (Tor Books, US) (2013)
- "The Day the World Turned Upside Down" (Lightspeed) (2014)
- "Hertenhart en Gembertimbaaltjes" (2017)
- "You Know How the Story Goes" (Tor Books) (2017)
- "Dolores Dolly Poppedijn" (Collectieve Propaganda van het Nederlandse Boek) (2019)
