= HEX (Olde Heuvelt novel) =

2013 horror novel by Thomas Olde Heuvelt

- Cover of 2013 Dutch edition
- Author: Thomas Olde Heuvelt
- Audio read by: Jeff Harding
- Translator: Nancy Forest-Flier
- Language: Dutch
- Genre: Horror
- Publisher: Luitingh-Sijthoff, Tor Books (US), Hodder & Stoughton (UK)
- Publication date: 2013
- Publication place: Netherlands
- English publication date: 2016
- Media type: Print, e-book, audiobook
- Pages: 384 (English edition)
- ISBN: 0765378809
- Preceded by: Harten Sara

HEX is a horror novel by Dutch author Thomas Olde Heuvelt. It was first published in Dutch in 2013 through Luitingh-Sijthoff and was published in English in 2016 through Tor Books, marking the first time one of Olde Heuvelt's novels have been published in English. The English version was translated by Nancy Forest-Flier and the decision was made to localize the work by shifting the story's setting from the Netherlands to the Hudson Valley in New York.

While re-writing the work to change the setting from Beek, Berg en Dal to New York, Olde Heuvelt also re-wrote and changed the book's ending from the original Dutch version.

Film and television rights for HEX have been purchased by Warner Brothers.

== Synopsis ==
The novel is set in the town of Black Spring, New York (Beek in the original Dutch version), where its inhabitants are routinely terrorized by the ghost of the Black Rock Witch. The witch was formerly a woman by the name of Katherine van Wyler, who was put to death in 1664 and had her eyes and mouth sewn shut after death. She will randomly appear in places throughout Black Spring and the townpeople track her progress via the HEX mobile app, which they use to avoid her as much as possible. The town has several core rules and safeguards in place to ensure that a delicate balance is kept. Two of the most major rules is that no outsiders can ever learn about the Black Rock Witch's existence and her stitches must never be removed. Leaving the town is not an option, as being away for longer than a few days causes townspeople to become suicidal. The townspeople try to make do as best as possible and discourage new people from coming into town, but this is not always successful.

Unhappy with this setup, a group of the town's teenagers secretly make plans to broadcast the witch's existence across the world, a move that puts them at risk of severe punishment from the town's council as videotaping the witch is forbidden. Initially the teens are cocky in their recordings, but over time tensions within their group begin to tear them apart and set in motion a terrible set of events that threaten to exterminate the entire town.

== Reception ==
Locus Online praised the English translation and felt that Olde Heuvelt's "adoption of the North American venue is cannily done, with no false steps a writer working from Europe might be expected to make." Jonathan Hatfull of SciFiNow compared Olde Heuvelt's work to that of Stephen King, especially Pet Sematary and Needful Things. Kirkus Reviews said that "The story is not merely unsettling, it is horrifying, and there is no redemption or image of hope in which one can find solace. But one cannot deny that it is well-done".

== See also ==
- Language localisation
- Transcreation
