= The Hex (video game) =

2018 video game

- Developer: Daniel Mullins Games
- Publisher: Daniel Mullins Games
- Composer: Jonah Senzel
- Engine: Unity
- Platforms: Microsoft Windows macOS; Linux
- Release: October 17, 2018
- Genre: Various
- Mode: Single-player

The Hex is a 2018 video game by Canadian independent developer Daniel Mullins. Its narrative takes place in a bar with six different characters the player controls; through the usage of flashbacks, the game encompasses different gameplay genres, each of which is associated with a player character. Mullins created the game as a follow-up to the success Pony Island, his previous game. The Hex was well-received by critics.

== Gameplay ==
In The Hex, the player controls six characters based on archetypical video game genres. The player experiences each of their pasts through gameplay associated with that genre — for instance, a platformer or top-down shooter. Each section of gameplay shares common controls, where the player uses the arrow keys. In between these segments, there are short puzzles in the form of an adventure game. As the game's narrative progresses, the world of the games and the narrative outside them is blended in a variety of ways, and the game interlaces multiple genres at once.

If the player follows hidden instructions, they are led to a secret ending that involves interacting with a free Steam game, Beneath The Surface, which implies it was created by a character from The Hex's fictional universe.

== Plot ==
The Hex features a cast of six prototypical video game characters who have met up in a bar, where they are informed that a murder will occur on the premises that night. Each character's backstory is told via flashback sequences in which the player controls the character in their original video game. In each segment, the character comes to despise the game environment, and attempts to become overpowered and remove themselves from the game world. This causes interference from Gameworks, who runs the non-player characters and game logic, and punishes them for non-compliance by psychologically torturing them. Between each flashback, the player controls the different characters as they navigate the tavern attempting to solve the mystery. The penultimate flashback, "Vicious Galaxy" is an unforgiving top-down shooter; in it, the different genres start to meld together, and the character ends up on a mission to steal an artifact from Gameworks.

The final game is a walking simulator, "Walk", which sees the player assume the role of a faceless stand in. The game is an autobiographical account of the creator of the other games, Lionel Snill. Snill describes building and discarding several game ideas while navigating the stresses of video game industry, but he eventually alienates those around him. At the end of "Walk" the non-player characters interfere to allow the player to acquire the artifact, which the "Vicious Galaxy" flashback was actually a cover to retrieve. This artifact, the titular Hex, allows the barkeep, a character from Snill’s very first game, to enter the real world and murder him, solving the mystery.

== Development ==
The game's developer, Daniel Mullins, first attempted to enter game development with a failed Kickstarter project, before finding success with the metafictional game Pony Island. After completing that game, he realised that to succeed, he had to continue doing games with unconventional gameplay. Alongside himself, he employed Pony Island composer Jonah Senzel and modeller Brendan Sullivan. After completing Pony Island, Mullins announced The Hex in July 2016.

His game development process was inspired by working on game jams, leading to an improvisational spirit. Although his use of the Unity game engine simplified development, Mullins stated that the creation of independent gameplay elements was difficult. Much of the genres in the game were aided by his experience working on actual small games of various genres. Initially, the game would have included autobiographical elements, with the fictional developer of the game's characters being "Lienad Snillum" (Mullins's name reversed). However, as he continued development, the character evolved into the more negative figure of Lionel Snill.

The game was released for Windows, Mac, and Linux in October 2018.

== Reception ==
Reception

Aggregate score
Aggregator	Score
Metacritic	PC: 81/100

Review scores
Publication	Score
Destructoid	7/10
Eurogamer Italy	8/10

According to aggregation site Metacritic, The Hex was generally favourably received by critics. Writing for Destructoid, Kevin Mersereau praised the changing of game genres, praising its "insanely creative twists". Eurogamer Italy's Luca Del Pizzo stated that "it only takes a few minutes... to understand the peculiarity, madness, courage and originality" of the game.

Del Pizzo praised the level of challenge in the game, describing it as balanced. Conversely, Mersereau stated that the game "holds your hand a little too much for my liking", describing a segment where the game gave the answer to a puzzle before he had the chance to solve it.

John Walker of Rock Paper Shotgun praised the depth of the game, saying it was a "joy to chat to others who've finished it". However, he criticised the pacing of some portions, saying that they "drag on for far too long". Nathan Grayson concurred in his review for Kotaku, but stated that those portions were forgettable as "there's so much to like".
