= Unleashed =

Unleashed may refer to:

== Art and entertainment ==
=== Film and television ===
- Unleashed (2001 film), a film featuring Jeff Anderson
- Unleashed (2005 film), a 2005 martial arts film starring Jet Li, Morgan Freeman and Bob Hoskins
- Unleashed (2016 film), a film starring Kate Micucci
- Unleashed (TV program), a 2020 Nickelodeon reality competition series
- "Unleashed" (Angel), an episode of Angel
- "Unleashed" (Fringe), an episode of Fringe
- "Unleashed" (Gotham), an episode of Gotham
- Women of Wrestling Unleashed, a pay-per-view event
- Unleashed, a 2009 video by comedian Sam Kinison
- Doctor Who: Unleashed, a documentary series

=== Music ===
- Unleashed (band), a Swedish death metal band
- "Unleashed", a song by Epica from the album Design Your Universe, 2009
- "Unleashed", a song by Killswitch Engage from the album Atonement, 2019

Albums

- Unleashed (Bow Wow album)
- Unleashed (Confederate Railroad album)
- Unleashed (Dannii Minogue album)
- Unleashed (Hurricane Chris album)
- Unleashed (LA Symphony album)
- Unleashed (Mark Collie album)
- Unleashed (Nashville Bluegrass Band album)
- Unleashed (Paris album)
- Unleashed (Skillet album)
- Unleashed (The U.M.C.'s album)
- Unleashed (Toby Keith album)
- Unleashed (Wolfstone album)
- Unleashed (Two Steps from Hell album), 2017
- Unleashed..., an album by The Dogs D'Amour
- Unleashed (soundtrack), a soundtrack album by Massive Attack, from the 2005 film (see above)
- Unleashed 2005, a New Zealand compilation rock album
- Unleashed, an album by Exilia
- Unleashed, an unreleased album by Lisa Scott-Lee
- Unleashed, an album by Nikki McKibbin
- Unleashed, an album by Renee Olstead
- Unleashed, an album by Ten Foot Pole

=== Video games ===
- Dancing Stage Unleashed, a sub-series of Dance Dance Revolution games
- Fear Factor: Unleashed, a 2004 video game
- Ghostbusters: Spirits Unleashed, a 2022 action game
- Godzilla: Unleashed, a 2007 Godzilla video game
  - Godzilla Unleashed: Double Smash, its Nintendo DS version
- Hot Wheels Unleashed, a 2021 Hot Wheels racing game
- Jaws Unleashed, a 2006 action-adventure game from the
- MX Unleashed, a 2004 racing game
- MX vs. ATV Unleashed, a 2005 crossover off-road racing game
- Need for Speed: Porsche Unleashed, a 2000 racing game from the Need for Speed series.
- Shift 2: Unleashed, a 2011 racing game from the Need for Speed series
- The Sims: Unleashed, a 2002 expansion pack of pets for The Sims computer game
- Sonic Unleashed, a 2008 game in the Sonic the Hedgehog series
- Star Wars: The Force Unleashed, a 2008 action-adventure game
- Star Wars: The Force Unleashed II, a 2010 action-adventure game
- Wrath Unleashed, 2004 strategy game

=== Other media ===
- Unleashed (memoir), a 2024 memoir by Boris Johnson
- Unleashed (Humphreys novel), a 2011 novel by Sara Humphreys
- Unleashed, a novel series by Ali Sparkes
- Unleashed, an urban fantasy/YA novel by Kristopher Reisz
- Unleashed, a 2009 dance production by flamenco dancer Joaquín Cortés

== Other uses ==
- Unleashed (Petco), a concept store operated by the pet-store chain Petco
