= ClanDestine =

Superhero comic book series

The ClanDestine
- Cover to ClanDestine (vol. 1) #1 (October 1994). Art by Alan Davis and Mark Farmer.

Publication information
- Publisher: Marvel Comics
- Schedule: Monthly
- Format: (vol. 1); Ongoing series (vol. 2); Limited series
- Publication date: (vol. 1); Oct. 1994 – Sep. 1995 (vol. 2); April 2008
- No. of issues: (vol. 1): 12 (vol. 2): 5
- Main character(s): Adam Destine; Walter Destine (Wallop); Kay Cera (Cuckoo); Samantha Hasard (Argent); Dominic (Hex); Newton; William Chance (Cap'n Oz); Rory Destine (Crimson Crusader); Pandora Destine (Imp); Albert; Gracie Gamble; Victor Destine; Florence; Maurice Fortuit

Creative team
- Created by: Alan Davis

Collected editions
- Clandestine Classic Premiere: ISBN 0-7851-2742-9
- ClanDestine: Blood Relative Premiere: ISBN 0-7851-2740-2

The ClanDestine (also known simply as ClanDestine) is an appellation used to refer to the Destines, a fictional secret family of long-lived superhuman beings appearing in American comic books published by Marvel Comics. They were created in 1994 by British writer/artist Alan Davis, and appear in various comic book series published by Marvel Comics. They first appeared in Marvel Comics Presents #158 (July 1994) before going on to appear in their own self-titled monthly series, The ClanDestine, which lasted twelve issues before it was cancelled. The characters subsequently appeared in a number of miniseries and one-shots, all written and drawn by Davis. The name ClanDestine, which is a play on the word clandestine, is used primarily as the title of the series in which the family stars, and is not generally used by the characters within the stories.

A version of the ClanDestine, known as Clandestines, appeared as antagonists of the Marvel Cinematic Universe Disney+ series Ms. Marvel (2022).

== Publication history ==
Creator Alan Davis explained that he likes the superhero genre in general, and the group book dynamic in particular, and was drawn to the opportunity to create a group of new characters unencumbered by a long and complex continuity, though he set it in the Marvel Universe in order to use characters like the Silver Surfer and MODOK in cameo roles. Davis chose to make the group a family because the familial bond is not one of choice. Davis was also interested in superhumans who used their powers to enhance their lives, but did not necessarily feel either any heroic obligations or megalomaniacal greed. Although he made the Destines an extended family in order to make up new family members as he went along, the core of the group would be Rory, Pandora, Samantha, Walter, Kay and Dominic. Although the family's full membership remains unrevealed for this reason, Walter has stated that there are "many" that eleven-year-old twins Rory and Pandora have not met.

After the end of the original series, Davis wrote and drew the 1996 miniseries X-Men and the ClanDestine, during which the events of the last four issues of the ongoing series (the only stories he had not written and drawn) were retconned as a dream. In 2008, he returned to the characters in a five-issue limited series. In 2012, he wrote and drew three linked annuals: Fantastic Four Annual #33, Daredevil Annual #1, and Wolverine Annual #1, each of which centered upon a different member of the Destine family interacting with the other heroes of the Marvel Universe.

== Fictional history ==
Adam of Ravenscroft was born in the village of Ravenscroft in the heart of England in the summer of 1168 A.D., when Saxon England was ruled by Norman conquerors. Adam's youth was unremarkable, and he grew content without ambition. When he was sixteen, however, he was accidentally impaled on a scythe, but he miraculously recovered after a dream about a strange, inhuman woman. He was renamed Adam of Destine by the town, who felt the young man was destined for greatness. In 1189, Adam joined the Third Crusade. During the battles, Adam was never once injured and he believed that the "angel" he dreamt about protected him. By 1191 he was a seasoned veteran of battles at Acre, Arsuf, and Jaffa. He became overconfident and reckless, and was captured by a warlord called Al Kadhdhaab. Kadhdhaab claimed that he needed Adam's help to defeat the wizard Sujanaa Min Raghbah. Centuries prior, Sujanaa captured a large gem with mystical powers that fulfilled his wishes. In a vision Sujanaa had seen that Adam was destined to kill him, and Kadhdhaab also knows this through a written prophecy. Adam traveled to Sujanaa's palace, but was captured by him. The wizard ranted that his gem loved Adam, and would not allow Sujanaa to hurt him. Adam managed to distract the wizard by telling him that Sujanaa had wasted his life, using all his power merely to protect his power. The wizard realized that he had become trapped by his own desire for power and during a moment of doubt, Adam was freed and killed the wizard. Adam then felt that there was something alive within the gem and tried to destroy its prison, but Kadhdhaab appeared and shot him in the back with a crossbow. Kadhdhaab tried to take the power of the gem for himself, but Adam managed to destroy the gem with his last strength. Elalyth, the female being within, called a Djinn, appeared and destroyed Kadhdhaab. She then restored Adam, making him immortal and invulnerable, and the two became lovers.

=== Relative strangers ===
A 1963 photo, showing (clockwise beginning with upper right:) Will, Walter, Florence, Adam, a pre-teen Samantha, Newton, Dominic, Kay, Maurice, and Vincent. From The ClanDestine (Vol. 1) #2. Art by Alan Davis and Mark Farmer.

Over the next few centuries Adam and Elalyth had many children, all of whom inherited superhuman abilities and were extremely long-lived. As civilization advanced, and the advent of modern technology made it more difficult for members of the family to disappear or pass themselves off as their own descendants, one of Adam's children, Newton, set up the Relative Stranger Protocol. The protocol would create new identities for the long-lived family members whenever they required it and would protect the family should one of them be uncovered. In the late 20th century, after Adam's son Vincent destroyed the family manor, Adam killed him, because Adam felt he had become "evil". The family fell apart after that. Dominic, who saw Adam's actions as unforgivable, became a hermit, living in solitude on a small island. Elalyth returned to her mystical home of Yden, and Adam, who saw his slaying of Vincent as a betrayal of her love, left Earth, traveling through outer space in a vehicle created by Newton. The newly born twins, Rory and Pandora, were left with Walter Destine, who posed as their uncle and guardian, and Florence, who posed as their grandmother.

=== Imp and the Crimson Crusader ===
Rory and Pandora's powers activated far earlier than those of their siblings, because they were twins. The children, believing they were mutants, decided to become superheroes. As the Crimson Crusader and Imp, they set out to battle crime. One evening they discover two groups, a creature named Lenz and his "children", and Dr. Hywel Griffin and his Omegans, fighting over a device called the Gryphon. Not knowing which side to help, the children grab the device and flee, intending to return it once they determine its rightful.

"Gryphon" is revealed to be an acronym for the device, its full name being Genetic Realignment Yield Polarity Harmonizing Orientation Net. It has the ability to genetically remodel a fully developed organism, irrespective of its age or genetic composition. Lenz, a former human scientist mutated into a monstrous form by Advanced Idea Mechanics (A.I.M.), hopes to use the Gryphon to stabilize his "children", who usually die within several days. Griffin is an albino who hopes to cure himself with the Gryphon. Both parties try to track down the Destine twins. During the twins' attempt to flee, Pandora loses lost her cape, which bears the name of their sister, Kay Cera, who designed it. Lenz sends his children to kill Kay, and they find the history of the ClanDestine in Kay's notebook. Kay herself survives by transferring her mind to a cat. Lenz's creatures attack the various members of the ClanDestine, killing Florence and Maurice. Most of the other family members unite and track down Griffin, whom they think are responsible for the deaths of Flo and Maurice. Lenz appears and kidnaps Rory, but they are all saved by Adam, who had felt the death of his children and returned to Earth. Adam defeats Lenz, but lets him go when he realizes that Lenz was not evil, but merely trying to ensure his species' survive.

When the Destines return home, Adam agrees to respect Walter's status as the twins' guardian, as Adam feels he relinquished that right when left Earth eleven years previously. Walter wants the children to return to school and live normal lives, even threatening to split them up after they get into trouble at school. The children flee to New York to become full-time superheroes, but Spider-Man convinces them to return home. Dominic and Adam convince Walter to allow the twins to go out at night on "crime patrol" confronting only petty crime, with the adults taking turns chaperoning them.

=== Dream sequence ===
Series creator Alan Davis left the series after issue #8. The series continued for four more issues under the creative team of writer Glenn Dakin and artists Pino Rinaldi and Bryan Hitch. In these four issues, Adam tries to return the Gryphon to Griffen, and Lenz, now allied with MODAM, tries to steal it again. MODAM is more interested in the Destine family, however, and kidnaps Jasmine, leaving a girl named Myror in her place. Myror has the ability to reflect to people what they wanted to see. Wanting Jasmine to return home with them, the Clan saw Myror as Jasmine. Myror eventually tells the Destines that she wanted to help them defeat MODAM, who had used her as a slave for years. Back in the A.I.M. base, MODAM tries to switch minds with Jasmine in order to acquire a beautiful, human body for herself. Meanwhile, Rory is manipulated by the spirit of Vincent into resurrecting him. While Vincent's only appearance to date was in a 1963 photo of him seen in issue #2 that showed him as a man with a normal build and brown hair in a style common to the 1960s, in this incarnation he appeared as a heavily muscled man with long blonde hair. Vincent joins Rory and Pandora into saving the Clan from MODAM, and A.I.M. Vincent uses his powers to torment all non-Destine family members with personal demons, including William and Myrror. Vincent then tells the others that with Adam's absence, he now has to take over the leadership of the family.

=== X-Men and The ClanDestine ===
This two-part series featured the first appearance of family member Gracie, who had been mentioned before. Years previously, Gracie and Jasmine had banished a demon called Synraith from Earth many years ago with the help of a younger and less experienced Charles Xavier. In the miniseries, the Synraith returns and tries eliminate the three who stopped him. The X-Men and the Destines team up to stop the demon and save their family members.

=== ClanDestine Volume 2 ===
ClanDestine (Vol. 2) #1 (April 2008). Art by Alan Davis.

A five-issue ClanDestine miniseries debuted on February 5, 2008, written and illustrated by Alan Davis. In this series, Dr. Griffin and the Omegans again attack the Destines. In the course of the story, what happened to Thaddeus in 1374 is revealed. Newton builds a device to help Dominic ameliorate the effects of his powerful senses. Dominic also travels through time and space, and encounters the superhero group Excalibur, in the middle of the "Cross-Time Caper" storyline that ran in their self-titled series in 1989–1990. The story also guest stars the Inhumans. Walter struggles with his fears of becoming like Vincent. By the end of the story, Adam reduces Griffin to an infant, and tells the Omegans never to threaten his family again, before being reunited with Elalyth, the mother of his children, with whom he goes to live in Yden. Dominic decides to relocate to the idyllic Etherea. In the closing panels of the story, a pool of energy emerges from the grounds of Ravenscroft, and flies into Vincent's grave, causing the gravestone to crack.

=== Marvel Tales by Alan Davis ===
In mid-2012 Alan Davis wrote and illustrated a trio of annuals under the brand "Marvel Tales by Alan Davis", which featured the ClanDestine as guest stars, including Vincent, in his first canonical appearances: Fantastic Four Annual #33, Daredevil Annual #1 and Wolverine Annual (vol 2) #1.

In Fantastic Four Annual #33, which reveals the circumstances under which Adam killed Vincent, the American superhero adventurers Thing, Human Torch and Doctor Strange encounter an interdimensional rift whose energy hurls them on a journey through time and space, during which they come into contact with the Destine family at various points in history. Thing in particular encounters Vincent as a young boy, then as a young man, and is present at his death. Vincent is tortured by his inability to use his powers to stop the pain and suffering in the world, and is revealed to have been possessed by demons who are trying to delay Doctor Strange in healing the dimensional rift. Fearing the destruction Vincent's powers are unleashing and for his son's soul, Adam fatally snaps Vincent's neck. The dimensional energy is driven away, and the Americans are returned home.

In Daredevil Annual #1, the Destines travel to New York tracking a robot called the Plastoid. Jasmine believes that it is inhabited by a parasitic elemental, whom she intends to banish back to its native dimension. Dominic and the rest of the Destines, however, believe the robot is in fact inhabited by Vincent's spirit, and aim to stop Jasmine from destroying it. During this conflict they also encounter Daredevil and Doctor Strange, who assist the family. Daredevil destroys the Plastoid, releasing Vincent's spirit.

The storyline concludes in Wolverine Annual (vol 2) #1, which includes a flashback depicting a prior adventure that Adam shared with Wolverine. In the present, Vincent animates a group of ancient Heliopolitan gods (hybrids of Egyptian deities and humans that resemble humanoids with animal heads), which battle Wolverine, Dr. Strange, and the Destine family, including Jasmine, who confirms telepathically that the being they are pursuing is indeed Vincent. Vincent explains that he arranged a number of events, including Adam and Elalyth's recent reunion, in order to bring about his own resurrection, and ultimately intends to use Wolverine's superhuman form as a vessel to contain his power. His plan is foiled by Jasmine, Rory, Pandora, and Wolverine, who destroy Vincent.

== Members ==
=== Living members ===
Although there is a core group of family members, Alan Davis has stated there are an unknown number of other family members who usually keep to themselves. For this reason, the following family members are listed in approximate order of age, based on the family tree given in the 2008 The ClanDestine miniseries, and other sources. Rik Destine, whose birth order is unknown, is placed before Rory and Pandora Destine, because the latter are known to be the youngest members of the family. All of the Destines, especially Adam, have a mental link to their family, allowing them to sometimes feel when other family members are in danger.

- Adam Destine – Adam was born Adam of Ravenscroft in 1168. While fighting in the Third Crusade, he rescued a Djinn named Elalyth that he first saw in a vision when he was sixteen. She made him immortal and invulnerable, and bore him numerous children. In 1374, Adam and his son Thaddeus were escorting his other son Albert to the Shalu Monastery in Shigatse, Tibet, when they were attacked by the Geong Si, an army of zombies controlled by the Inhuman Tral. During the battle, Thaddeus was knocked off a cliff, and the otherwise pacifistic Albert, in his grief, lashed out at their attackers, discovering that his healing ability could be manifested as a weapon, and killed them all, much to his subsequent regret. Other Inhumans then appeared, explaining that Tral was a criminal who escaped their hidden city. Adam traveled to Russia in 1612 to help establish the Romanov dynasty. While horseback riding through the Sayan Mountains in 1615 en route to Japan to aid Albert and Grace, he encountered a trio of insectoid aliens attempting to construct a teleportational portal through which to bring an army to claim the Earth. The aliens attacked Adam, but none of their weapons could harm him, and believing that his invulnerability was representative of the entire human race, they departed, fearing they could not conquer Earth. Adam comes to view his long existence as a curse, and finds that because of his invulnerability, his senses are numbed, and he does not feel pleasure any more than he feels pain.
- Elalyth – A green-skinned being called a Djinn, similar to a genie, who met Adam in the 12th century. She gave him the gift of immortality. After Adam killed Vincent, she left him, and returned to the mystical realm of Yden. Aside from flashbacks, Elalyth did not appear, nor was her name revealed, until ClanDestine (Vol. 2) #5, in which she is reunited with Adam.
- Jasmine Destine, also known as Kay Cera and as Cuckoo – The first born of Adam and Elalyth's children, Jasmine is an 800-year-old telepath who has the ability to transfer her consciousness to mortally wounded host bodies when the one she inhabits is destroyed, and having her brother Albert heal the body's injuries, for which she is known as Cuckoo. Jasmine is able to read the minds of others, project telepathic illusions, project her astral body, bring the astral bodies of other people to her location, and transfer her mind to the bodies of other humans and even animals to prolong her life. She is a hedonist, and will use her powers for her own benefit, casually reading or manipulating the minds of others without their permission, out of curiosity, personal gain or anger, much to the disapproval of others. Alan Davis designed Jasmine out of his love of drawing "impossibly beautiful" women. Jasmine was originally named Mosiac, then Kimera, but was changed to her final name to avoid confusion with the DC Comics series Green Lantern: Mosaic and the Marvel Comics character Kymaera respectively. (Note: Jasmine's current body is sometimes depicted as a Caucasian, and other times with brown skin of varying tones.)
- Albert Destine – A monk in the Seventh Moon temple in Nepal, who has the ability to heal others. Albert suffered terribly when he attempted to use his powers to stem the Black Death that had swept through Europe. In the winter of 1374, he was being escorted to the Shalu Monastery in Shigatse, Tibet by Adam and his brother Thaddeus. When Thaddeus was knocked over a cliff by an army of zombies led by the Inhuman Tral, Albert lashed out, discovering his healing ability could be used as a weapon, and killed Tral, much to his subsequent regret. Like Kay, Gracie and Nathaniel, he is a practitioner of the mystic arts, but has never been adept as they in using them. Among his mystical abilities is the ability to teleport people across large distances.
- Grace "Gracie" Destine – Born in 1503, Grace is an archeologist with strong telepathic and telekinetic powers. In 1519, when she and Jasmine were in the newly discovered Mexico, exploring the territory with Hernán Cortés's conquistadores, sixteen-year-old Grace posed as his valet. When the conquistadores attacked the Aztecs, Grace, whose emerging psychic gifts were too immature to use as weapons, left with Jasmine and some of the Aztecs that they had befriended, but the two were separated. Grace followed Jasmine's example, and learned to channel eldritch forces to enhance her powers. In doing this, she accidentally unleashed a demon called the Synraith. She managed to seal the dimensional rift from which it came, but as it now knew where our dimension was, it would eventually return. Centuries later, Grace fought the Synraith a second time with Jasmine and a young Charles Xavier. Grace finally manages to destroy the Synraith during the 1996 ClanDestine and X-Men miniseries.
- Newton Destine – A superhuman genius whose talents include mechanical engineering, chemistry, medicine and surgery. He built the ClanDestine's advanced technology and set up the Relative Strangers Protocol. He vanished to Etherea, an alternate Earth in another dimension, during Rory and Pandora's infancy, but teleports back to Earth whenever Dominic calls him, using a special signal watch. As Warlord of Ethera, he uses a larger secondary body suited to the lifestyle of a leader, keeping his original body in suspended animation. In addition to teleportational devices, he has also built sophisticated powered armor suits and weapons.
- Walter "Wallop" Destine – Walter is a writer of romance novels under the pseudonym Sabrina Bentley, who has the ability to transform into a large, hulking blue creature with immense strength and invulnerability. He usually maintains his personality and intelligence in this state, but when pushing his ability to transform larger and larger, his hair becomes aflame, and he is prone to losing his temper, and going berserk. He can also inadvertently transform if he loses his temper or if it is triggered by psychic attack. Walter is at least 200 years old, and has experienced conflict in numerous wars. He was in Shanghai during the Opium War, in Balaclava during the Crimean War, in Delhi during the Sepoy Mutiny, in Passchendaele during World War I, and in El Alamein during World War II, during which he served with military intelligence. Alan Davis tried to design a costume for Wallop, but felt they all looked silly in some of his more extreme incarnations.
- William "Oz" Chance – An actor who plays the role of Cap'n Oz in action movies. He has peak human strength and acrobatic agility. He first appeared in The ClanDestine (Vol. 1) #2. He was present at the 1969 Woodstock festival with Dominic and the adolescent Vincent.
- Dominic "Hex" Destine – As a child, Dominic felt neglected by Adam, whom he saw as aloof. After developing his super senses in adulthood, he became an illusionist and escapologist named Hex. After Adam killed Vincent, Dominic retreated to a remote island for eleven years. Although Dominic moved to the Destine family estate following Adam's return to Earth, he refused a reconciliation with Adam, saying that he would never forgive him for killing Vincent. Walter describes Dominic as quite brilliant, with a capacity for flawless deductive reasoning. This, and his enhanced senses, make him the ultimate sleuth. He is an expert hand-to-hand fighter with a slim, athletic build, and his knowledge of pressure points and nerve clusters makes him one of the few people who can hurt or subdue Walter in his transformed state. When living at the Destine estate, he usually spends his time in an anechoic chamber created by Newton to avoid sensory overload. Alan Davis conceptualized Dominic as an animalistic wild man, with his original name being Vex.
- Samantha "Sam" Destine – An artist who has the power to generate and shape a metallic ectoplasmic armor and weapons around her. The design of the armor is an unconscious expression of her artistic mind, as it reacts to her thoughts. The shape and hardness of her metal forms are varied, as she can also generate a set of wings like a hang glider. The armor's beauty and strength can make flesh seem repulsive to her, and as a result, she has grown apart from ordinary people. The armor acts as a second skin, with a sense of touch similar to her own flesh. Alan Davis, who describes her as "aloof, brooding [and] exotic", explained that he originally designed the character, nicknamed Argent, in 1991 for a series that he and Paul Neary tried to develop. Davis made her armor constantly changing to alleviate having to draw it consistently.
- Rik Destine – Nothing is known of Rik other than his name, and the fact that he is alive, as Kay mentions in ClanDestine (Vol. 2) #3.
- Rory and Pandora Destine – Whereas Adam's other children manifested their abilities in adulthood, 11-year-old twins (Note: The twins' age is derived from the fact that Adam left Earth for 11 years, according to The ClanDestine #2, and Kay said he had not seen them since they were infants when he reunited with them at the end of #4.) Rory and Pandora manifested their abilities six months prior to ClanDestine #1 because as twins, their powers stimulate each other when in close proximity, and only manifest themselves as such. Rory, also known as Crimson Crusader, has the ability to manipulate gravity, allowing him to fly and create force fields. Pandora, also known as Imp, is able to manipulate light. She can project beams of light powerful enough to pulverize boulders or focus them to create laser beams that can instantly cut through objects. She can bend light around her and other objects in order to make them invisible.

=== Members of unknown status ===
- Nathaniel Destine - All that is known about Nathaniel is that like Kay, Gracie and Albert, he is a practitioner of the mystic arts, but according to Albert, Nathaniel is far more adept with them than Albert himself is.

=== Deceased members ===
- Thaddeus Destine - Thaddeus was the second oldest of Adam and Elalyth's known children, and their oldest known son. Thaddeus was a warrior born with the ability to adopt the aspect of any beast. He was a highly skilled fighter with great strength and speed. In the winter of 1374, he was killed after being knocked off a cliff by the Inhuman Tral.
- Vincent Destine - Vincent had the ability to teleport himself and others across both time and space, enabling him to visit settings that included the Jurassic era, Ancient Rome and the 1969 Woodstock festival, though he did not develop the skill to control the destinations until he was older. He also had the ability to shrink people down in size. As a young boy, he used his powers to summon the Thing and the Human Torch, whom he believed were elementals that he had conjured for his bidding. Traveling forward through time would cause him to apparently disappear for months and years to his family, which greatly disturbed them. By the time he was a young man, Vincent had become inspired by a poet and philosopher named Pitor, and sought his counsel for an "insoluble dilemma", but was grief-stricken when Pitor was beaten to death by skinheads, and became suicidal over how his life had become "a knot of temporal paradox". He was also angered at his family for what he perceived as their apathy towards global suffering, characterizing them as "self-absorbed parasites". After discovering that Vincent was possessed by a demonic energy that was unleashing his destructive potential, Adam killed him, feeling that he had failed to protect Vincent.
- Florence "Flo" Destine - Flo pretended to be Rory and Pandora's grandmother. In the introductory storyline, she is killed by Lenz's creatures. With her dying breath, she tells Walter to inform the twins of the truth about the family.
- Maurice Fortuit - A red-haired man, the full nature of his powers has not been revealed, but he is able to generate some type of energy around his hands. He is killed by Lenz's creatures at his mountain top chalet in the Swiss Alps near St. Moritz. Albert saw Maurice as an alive, passionate fighter, and a good man, but lamented that his temper would be the death of him.
- Garth, Sherlock, and Lance Destine - All that is known about them are their headstones on the Destine property.
- Adam's parents - Their gravestones are seen in the family graveyard. Kay met them in 1209 on the family property, when it was a Saxon village.

== Collected editions ==
Title	Material collected	Published date	ISBN
ClanDestine versus the X-Men	ClanDestine (vol. 1) #1–8, X-Men & ClanDestine #1–2	October 1997	978-0785105572
ClanDestine Classic	ClanDestine (vol. 1) #1–8, X-Men & ClanDestine #1–2, Marvel Comics Presents #158	February 2008	978-0785127420
ClanDestine: Blood Relative	ClanDestine (vol. 2) #1–5	September 2008	978-0785127406
Marvel Tales by Alan Davis	Daredevil (vol. 3) Annual #1, Fantastic Four Annual #33, Wolverine (vol. 4) Annual #1, Thor: The Truth of History #1	November 2012	978-0785140320
ClanDestine: Family Ties	ClanDestine (vol. 2) #1–5, Daredevil (vol. 3) Annual #1, Fantastic Four Annual #33, Wolverine (vol. 4) Annual #1	October 2018	978-1302913182

== In other media ==
The 2022 Disney+ series Ms. Marvel features a group known as the Clandestines, though this group bears no resemblance to the Destine family. In the series, they are depicted as Djinn exiled from the Noor dimension, whose origin is tied to the background of series protagonist Kamala Khan and her family, in particular her great-grandmother, Aisha, and her activities during the Partition.
