= Unleash Award =

Dutch literary award

The Unleash Award was the annual award for the best Dutch fantasy/science-fiction and horror/suspense short story with a wordcount between 2,000 and 6,000 words.

Other annual Dutch awards in the SF/F/H genres are the Harland Award (for short stories and novelettes with a word count up to 10,000 words) and Fantastels (for short stories and novelettes with a word count up to 12,000 words).

== History ==
The forerunner of the Unleash Award was the Santoriaanse opdracht, since 2003. In 2006 the name changed to Unleash Award. The prize was initially awarded in two separate categories and twice a year (with overall winners). Since 2009 it is awarded once a year. The last time the Unleash Award was organized was in 2012.

== Winners ==
Editie	Category Fantasy/SF	Category Horror/Suspense
Fall 2006	Alex de Jong; Sven de Keyser	Anko van der Woude
Spring 2007	Harald Timmer	Saskia Appel
Overall 2006/2007	Sven de Keyser	Saskia Appel
Fall 2007	Django Mathijsen	Fred Rabouw
Spring 2008	Django Mathijsen	Jean-Paul Colin
Overall 2007/2008	Django Mathijsen	Jean-Paul Colin

	Overall
2009	Pieter Koolwijk
2010	Anaïd Haen
2011	Patrick Brannigan
