= Eddy C. Bertin =

- Born: 26 December 1944; Altona, Hamburg, Germany
- Died: 21 May 2018 (aged 73); Crete
- Occupation: Author
- Writing career
- Pen name: Edith Brendall, Doriac Greysun
- Genres: Science fiction, horror fiction, children's literature

Eddy C. Bertin (26 December 1944 – 21 May 2018) was a Belgian author of adult and children's fiction, best known in the United States for his science fiction. He also wrote under the pseudonyms Edith Brendall, Doriac Greysun and others.

== Life ==
Bertin was born in Altona, Hamburg, Germany, to a Belgian father and a German mother. The family moved to Belgium soon after his birth, where he resided since with the exception of one year in Germany. He studied languages at the Provincial Trade and Higher Technical Institute in Ghent, after which he initially worked at a bank. He later became a full-time writer. He lived in "Dunwich House" in Gentbrugge. He is the father of actress Brenda Bertin.

== Writing career ==
Bertin began writing stories at a young age. He published his first science fiction stories at the end of the 1960s, subsequently branching out into horror, his main literary genre, and (in 1984) children's fiction. Much of his work belongs to a cycle of pieces detailing a future history of mankind. Notable among his children's books are the Valentina Hellebel stories, issued in seven books from 1993 to 2004. He also wrote more than forty pulp novels under various pseudonyms and translations from Dutch to English and English to Dutch. A relatively small portion of his shorter works have been published in English, most of it in the 1970s.

== Bibliography of works published in English ==
=== Collections ===
- The Whispering Horror (2013)

=== Short stories ===
- "The City, Dying" (1968)
- "The Whispering Horror" (1968)
- "A Taste of Rain and Darkness" (1970)
- "Shadows of Fear" (1970)
- "Timestorm" (1971)
- "Picnic" (1971)
- "I Wonder What He Wanted" (1971)
- "The Ashley Premiere" (1971)
- "Horror House" (1972)
- "My Eyes, They Burn!" (1972)
- "Composed of Cobwebs" (1972)
- "A House with a Garden" (1972)
- "Like Two White Spiders" (1973)
- "The Taste of Your Love" (1975)
- "A Pentagram for Cenaide" (1975)
- "Darkness, My Name Is" (1976)
- "A Whisper of Leathery Wings" (1976)
- "The Lover" (1977)
- "The Price to Pay" (1977)
- "Behind the White Wall" (1977)
- "I Hate You" (1977)
- "Something Small, Something Hungry" (1978)
- "The Sea is My Bed" (1978)
- "The Way Back Home" (1979)
- "My Beautiful Darkling" (1980)
- "Never Touching" (1981)
- "Something Ending" (1982)
- "To Save the World!" (1983)
- "The Waiting Dark" (1985)
- "The Gibbering Walls" (1989)
- "Belinda's Coming Home" (2006)
- "Dunwich Dreams, Dunwich Screams" (2005)
- "When You'll Be Ten" (2005)
- "The Eye in the Mirror" (2008)
- "Ten" (2013)
- "The Man Who Collected Eyes" (2013)
- "My Fingers Are Eating Me" (2013)

=== Poetry ===
- "My House, Full of Shadows" (1970)
- "The Burial of the Hydra" (1970)
- "The Creeping Shadows" (1970)
- "Where Are Yesterday's Castles" (1973)
- "A Song for the Living, A Song for the Dead" (1973)
- "And the Darkness Never Answers" (1973)
- "Starsick Blues" (1981)
- "Waiting for the Dark"

=== Book reviews ===
- "Four for Tomorrow by Roger Zelazny" (1973)
- "The Book of Brian Aldiss by Brian W. Aldiss" (1973)
- "Report on Planet Three, and Other Speculations by Arthur C. Clarke" (1973)
- "The Wind from the Sun by Arthur C. Clarke" (1973)
- "Science Fiction: the Great Years by Frederik Pohl and Carol Pohl" (1973)
- "Badge of Infamy by Lester del Rey" (1973)
- "The Sky Is Falling by Lester del Rey" (1973)
- "The Day the Sun Stood Still by Anonymous" (1973)
- "Swan Song by Robert R. McCammon" (1988)
