= The End (comics) =

Line of comic books published by Marvel Comics

The cover to Hulk: The End, the first comic book of The End series

The End are comic books published by Marvel Comics, which take place outside of normal continuity, which feature possible final endings for Marvel characters. The outcomes vary from grim to optimistic.

== Titles ==
- Fantastic Four: The End (six-issue limited series)
- Hulk: The End (one-shot)
- Iron Man: The End (one-shot)
- Marvel: The End (six-issue limited series)
- Spider-Girl: The End! (one-shot)
- The Punisher: The End (one-shot)
- Wolverine: The End (six-issue limited series)
- X-Men: The End (a trilogy of six-issue limited series)
- Captain America: The End (one-shot)
- Captain Marvel: The End (one-shot)
- Deadpool: The End (one-shot)
- Doctor Strange: The End (one-shot)
- Miles Morales: The End (one-shot)
- Venom: The End (one-shot)

== Collected editions ==
Title	Material collected	Published date	ISBN
X-Men: The End Book 1 - Dreamers And Demons	X-Men: The End - Dreamers and Demons #1-6	March 2005	978-0785116905
X-Men: The End Book 2 - Heroes And Martyrs	X-Men: The End - Heroes and Martyrs #1-6	November 2005	978-0785116912
X-Men: The End Book 3 - Men and X-Men	X-Men: The End - Men and X-Men #1-6	September 2006	978-0785116929
Punisher Max: From First To Last	Punisher: The End and Punisher: The Tyger, Punisher: The Cell	December 2007	978-0785122760
Spectacular Spider-Girl: The Last Stand	Spider-Girl: The End and Spectacular Spider-Girl (vol. 2) #1-4, material from Web of Spider-Man (vol. 2) #5-7	November 2010	978-0785148999
Marvel Universe: The End	Marvel Universe: The End #1-6	April 2019	978-1302915674
Wolverine: The End	Wolverine: The End #1-5	February 2020	978-1302924607
Fantastic Four: The End	Fantastic Four: The End #1-6	February 2020	978-1302924621
Hulk: The End	Incredible Hulk: The End #1 and Hulk: Future Imperfect #1-2	February 2020	978-1302924638
Iron Man: The End	Iron Man: The End #1 and Tales of Suspense #39, Iron Man #144, 116	February 2020	978-1302924614
The End	Captain America: The End, Captain Marvel: The End, Deadpool: The End, Doctor Strange: The End, Miles Morales: The End, Venom: The End	September 2020	978-1302924997
The End Omnibus	Incredible Hulk: The End, Marvel Universe: The End (2003) 1-6, Wolverine: The End (2003) 1-6, X-Men: The End Book One (2004) 1-6, X-Men: The End Book Two (2005) 1-6, X-Men: The End Book Three (2006) 1-6, Fantastic Four: The End (2006) 1-6, Iron Man: The End (2008) 1, Captain America: The End, Captain Marvel: The End, Deadpool: The End, Doctor Strange: The End, Miles Morales: The End, Venom: The End	January 2025	978-1302959661
