= Hex: Shards of Fate =

2016 video game

- Developer: Cryptozoic Entertainment
- Engine: Unity
- Platforms: Microsoft Windows, OS X, PlayStation 4
- Release: January 26, 2016
- Genres: Massively multiplayer, trading card

HEX: Shards of Fate (Hex, Hex TCG or Hex: Card Clash) was a massively multiplayer online trading card game (MMOTCG) by Cryptozoic Entertainment. It is the first game in the MMOTCG genre. It was funded via Kickstarter, and raised US$2,278,255 while its campaign was active. As of October 28, 2013, Hex was the 11th most-funded video game on Kickstarter. The game was officially released on January 26, 2016, and was playable on Windows, OS X and iOS.

Hex: Shards of Fate started Closed Alpha testing on October 8, 2013. In April 2014, the game went into Closed Beta, which included all Kickstarter backers as well as so-called "Slacker Backers", with new players being invited to join in the following months. As of May 2015, the game was available on PC in an early access phase and clients for iOS and Android were being worked on. As a digital TCG, it featured unique features, such as being able to modify cards pre-match and transform cards during the match. The game was shut down and closed permanently in December 2020.

== Lawsuit ==
On May 14, 2014, Wizards of the Coast filed a lawsuit against Cryptozoic for infringement of intellectual property, claiming that Hex: Shards of Fate is nearly a clone of Magic: The Gathering. Wizards of the Coast says "While we appreciate a robust and thriving trading card game industry, we will not permit the misappropriation of our intellectual property." On May 19, 2014, Cryptozoic responded to the lawsuit that "Although we take all pending litigation seriously, we do not find any merit to the allegations in the complaint." On Sep 24, 2015, Wizards of the Coast, Cryptozoic Entertainment and Hex Entertainment settled the lawsuit with undisclosed terms.

== Sets ==
Expansion sets:

1. Shards of Fate
2. Shattered Destiny
3. Armies of Myth
4. Primal Dawn
5. Herofall
6. Scars of War
7. Frostheart
8. Dead of Winter
9. Doombringer
