= Moves (ballet) =

Ballet choreographed by Jerome Robbins

- Choreographer: Jerome Robbins
- Premiere: July 3, 1959; Spoleto, Italy
- Original ballet company: Ballets: USA
- Genre: neoclassical ballet

Moves (Note: Subtitled A Ballet in Silence About Relationships, or A Ballet in Silence,) is a ballet choreographed by Jerome Robbins. The ballet was made for Robbins's troupe Ballet: USA's 1959 tour, with Aaron Copland brought in to write the music. However, he struggled with the score, and Robbins ultimately decided to have the ballet performed in silence instead. The ballet premiered at the Festival of Two Worlds held in Spoleto, Italy, on July 3, 1959. It has since been revived by other dance companies, including the New York City Ballet. Copland's score was later published as Dance Panels.

== Choreography ==
Moves is performed in silence, with the dancers in practice clothes, and without scenery. It is an ensemble piece. Robbins wrote that without music, sets and costumes, the ballet "places the dancer's body under a magnifying glass. The relationships on stage are different in silence. Nothing is holding the dance or the emotion but the movements and their relationships to each other." The choreography contains sight cues and small audible cues to allow the dancers to know the tempo.

== Production ==
In 1959, Robbins's company Ballet: USA was set to tour sixteen countries under the auspices of the State Department. Having previously used Aaron Copland's Clarinet Concerto for his The Pied Piper and staged Copland's opera The Tender Land, Robbins had wanted to work with the composer again. Though the former intended to choreograph a large-scale ballet to The Red Pony for New York City Ballet's tenth anniversary season, the project was abandoned because of Robbins's works in musical theater, and Ballet: USA did not have the resource to do so.

When Copland offered to write a score for Robbins, the latter was "very inwardly excited" and "so honored". He accepted the offer immediately, and provided his idea, "a non-story ballet tentatively entitled Theatre Waltzes or something like that," that would

represent ... the style, youth, technical competence, theatrical qualities and personalities of the company in pure dance terms. The technique is essentially classic ballet (in the way that Americans employ it) and to make the whole ballet a decorative statement – open, positive, inventive, joyous (rather than introspective) – a parade; a presentation; perhaps elegant, witty, tender and with a sure technique.

Robbins also gave a list of twenty-two potential movements. However, he noted, "These are only ideas – and all can be thrown out if anything suggests something else – Feel Free." Copland struggled with fulfilling Robbins's ideas. When rehearsals were about to start, he had just begun, but was able to play what was done on the piano to Robbins. The choreographer then started working on the ballet. Some of the dancers noted Robbins using the 3/4 time signature and had the pianist play Copland's score in the beginning, but days later decided to rehearse in silence. Robbins recalled,

A strange thing happened. I went straight to rehearsal without the music right after Aaron played the score for me. I tried to remember it, but could only recall the counts. When I began working with the company just with counts, I got interested with what they were doing without music. It fascinated me, and I continued working that way. It really moved along.

In early June, just before the company was scheduled to leave for the tour, Copland provided a sketch of the score, with a note stating, "I couldn't stop to get help with playing [it], so have sent you a mere outline of the piece, will do another version for you later." Robbins realized his choreography and Copland's score were very different. The score was "great ... and full of such truly sensitive music that there is insufficient time for me to have a full and urgent grasp of its wonderful material." Robbins therefore decided to have the ballet performed in silence and named it Moves.

American National Theater and Academy (ANTA), the sponsor of the ballet, and the State Department panel were outraged and attempted to get Robbins abandon Moves. A run-through was held before the company left for the tour. Though Robbins thought it needed some cutting, it was well-received, including by Copland, but was despised by the panel. The panel attempted to get Moves replaced with Interplay. Robbins had also considered this but rejected this idea because Interplay is too similar to N.Y. Export: Opus Jazz, which would also be performed on tour.

Copland's score was later published as Dance Panels. In a later interview, Robbins said, "I was sorry I wasn't able to do Dance Panels, but in a very real way Aaron's music was the accidental genesis of my ballet without music, Moves."

== Original cast ==
The original cast consisted of:

- Erin Martin
- Michael Maule
- Lawrence Gradus
- John Jones
- James Moore
- Bill Reilly
- Doug Spingler
- Jamie Bauer
- Gwen Lewis
- Jane Mason
- Barbara Milberg
- Christine Mayer

== Performances ==
Moves premiered on July 3, 1959, at the Festival of Two Worlds, organized by Gian Carlo Menotti, held in Spoleto, Italy. It was then taken on tour. With shows sold out and critical acclaim, ANTA became more positive with the ballet.

In 1966, Robbins staged Moves for the Batsheva Dance Company in Israel. The following year, it was added to Joffrey Ballet's repertory. In 1984, Robbins's company, the New York City Ballet, debuted Moves. In 1993, Robbins remounted the ballet for the Paris Opera Ballet.
