= The Second Hurricane =

Opera in two acts by Aaron Copland to a libretto by Edwin Denby

- Opera by Aaron Copland
- Librettist: Edwin Denbguage
- Language: English
- Premiere: April 21, 1937; Henry Street Settlement, New York City, New York

The Second Hurricane is an opera in two acts by Aaron Copland to a libretto by Edwin Denby. Specifically written for school performances, it lasts just under an hour and premiered on April 21, 1937, at the Henry Street Settlement playhouse in New York City. Set in the United States in the 1930s, the opera tells the story of a group of high school students who become trapped on an island while working to rescue the victims of a hurricane.

== Background and performance history ==
The Second Hurricane was Copland's first attempt at composing opera. It was commissioned by the Henry Street Settlement in New York City, and it premiered at the settlement's playhouse on April 21, 1937, performed by students at its music school. The premiere production was designed by Orson Welles and conducted by Lehman Engel. The young Joseph Cotten played the small speaking role of Mr. Maclenahan.

The work was performed on CBS Radio May 9, 1937, in a one-hour broadcast directed by Earle McGill.

The work has only been sporadically performed since its premiere. During a weeklong celebration of Copland's 80th birthday in 1980, it was performed one night at Memphis State University with students from the Memphis Public Schools, directed by Robert Swift. In honor of Copland's 85th birthday, it was revived at the Henry Street Settlement in November 1985 in a production by Tazewell Thompson which restored an aria and a ballet which had been cut from the work at its premiere. On the 100th anniversary of his birth, a new version was premiered at the 11th Chicago Humanities Festival. For the Chicago production, the producer and musical director Michael Barrett and Jamie Bernstein Thomas (the daughter of Leonard Bernstein) wrote a new libretto updating the story from the 1930s to 2000; the action takes place in a television studio, where the protagonists describe their adventures for a cable-television show called Teen Heroes. In 2014, the opera was revived in Columbia, South Carolina as a co-production between the University of South Carolina's Magellan scholar program, Opera at USC, FBN Productions, Inc., and Columbia Music Festival Association. The cast was composed of community students from across the Midlands region of South Carolina and was directed by a university senior, Kate McKinney.

== Roles ==
Role	Voice type	Premiere cast April 21, 1937 (Conductor: Lehman Engel)
Butch, a new kid	tenor	John Doepper
Fat, a bully	bass	Harry Olive
Gyp, Fat's younger brother	baritone	Arthur Anderson
Lowrie, the school "brain"	tenor	Buddy Mangan
Gwen, a resolute girl	contralto	Estelle Levy
Queenie, head of the class	soprano	Vivian Block
Jeff, a black country boy	boy soprano	Carl Crawford
Mr. Maclenahan, an airline pilot	(speaking role)	Joseph Cotten
Mr. Lester, school principal	(speaking role)	Clifford Mack
Radio operator	(speaking role)	Charles Pettinger
Chorus of high school pupils; Chorus of parents; Chorus of elementary school pupils

== Recording ==
- In the Beginning / The Second Hurricane – New York High School of Music & Art soloists and chorus, New York Philharmonic Orchestra conducted by Leonard Bernstein. Label: Sony 60560

== Sources ==
- Boosey & Hawkes. Copland, Aaron, The Second Hurricane (1936). Retrieved 11 January 2012.
- Copland, Aaron and Kostelanetz Richard (ed.) (2004). Aaron Copland: A Reader: Selected Writings 1923–1972. Routledge. ISBN 0-415-93940-2
- Crist, Elizabeth Bergman (2009). Music for the Common Man: Aaron Copland During the Depression and War. Oxford University Press. ISBN 0-19-538359-1
- France, Richard (1977). The Theatre of Orson Welles. Bucknell University Press. ISBN 0-8387-1972-4
- New York Times (8 April 1937) "Lead Roles Filled in Juvenile Opera, World Premiere of 'Second Hurricane' To Be Held Here on 21 April". Retrieved 11 January 2012 (subscription required).
- New York Times (22 April 1937). "'Second Hurricane' in World Premiere". Retrieved 13 January 2012.
- Pollack, Howard (2000). Aaron Copland: The Life and Work of an Uncommon Man. University of Illinois Press. ISBN 0-252-06900-5
- Rockwell, John (15 November 1985). "Copland's 'Second Hurricane'". New York Times. Retrieved 11 January 2012.
- Von Rhein, John (12 November 2000). "Aaron Copland's 'The Second Hurricane' at the Francis W. Parker School". Chicago Tribune. Retrieved 11 January 2012.
