= Night Thoughts (disambiguation) =

Night-Thoughts is an 18th-century poem by Edward Young.

Night Thoughts or Night Thought may also refer to:

- Night Thoughts of a Classical Physicist, a 1982 novel by Russell McCormach
- Night Thoughts (audio drama), a 2006 Doctor Who audio drama
- Night Thoughts (album), a 2016 album by Suede
- Night Thoughts, an album by Justin Connolly
- "Night-Thoughts" (piano piece), a 1972 composition by Aaron Copland
- Night Thoughts, a 1940 work for piano by William Alwyn
- Night Thoughts, a 1982 composition for solo flute by Nicholas Maw
