= The Red Pony (disambiguation) =

The Red Pony is a 1933 novella by John Steinbeck.

The Red Pony may also refer to:

- The Red Pony, Henry Standing Bear's bar in the TV series Longmire
- The Red Pony (1949 film), an adaptation of Steinbeck's novella
  - The Red Pony (Aaron Copland song), a musical score composed by Aaron Copland for the 1949 film
- The Red Pony (1973 film), a TV film adaptation of the novella
- Red Pony Records, a record label founded by 80s country music singer Sylvia
