= Valery Panov =

Israeli dancer and choreographer (1938–2025)

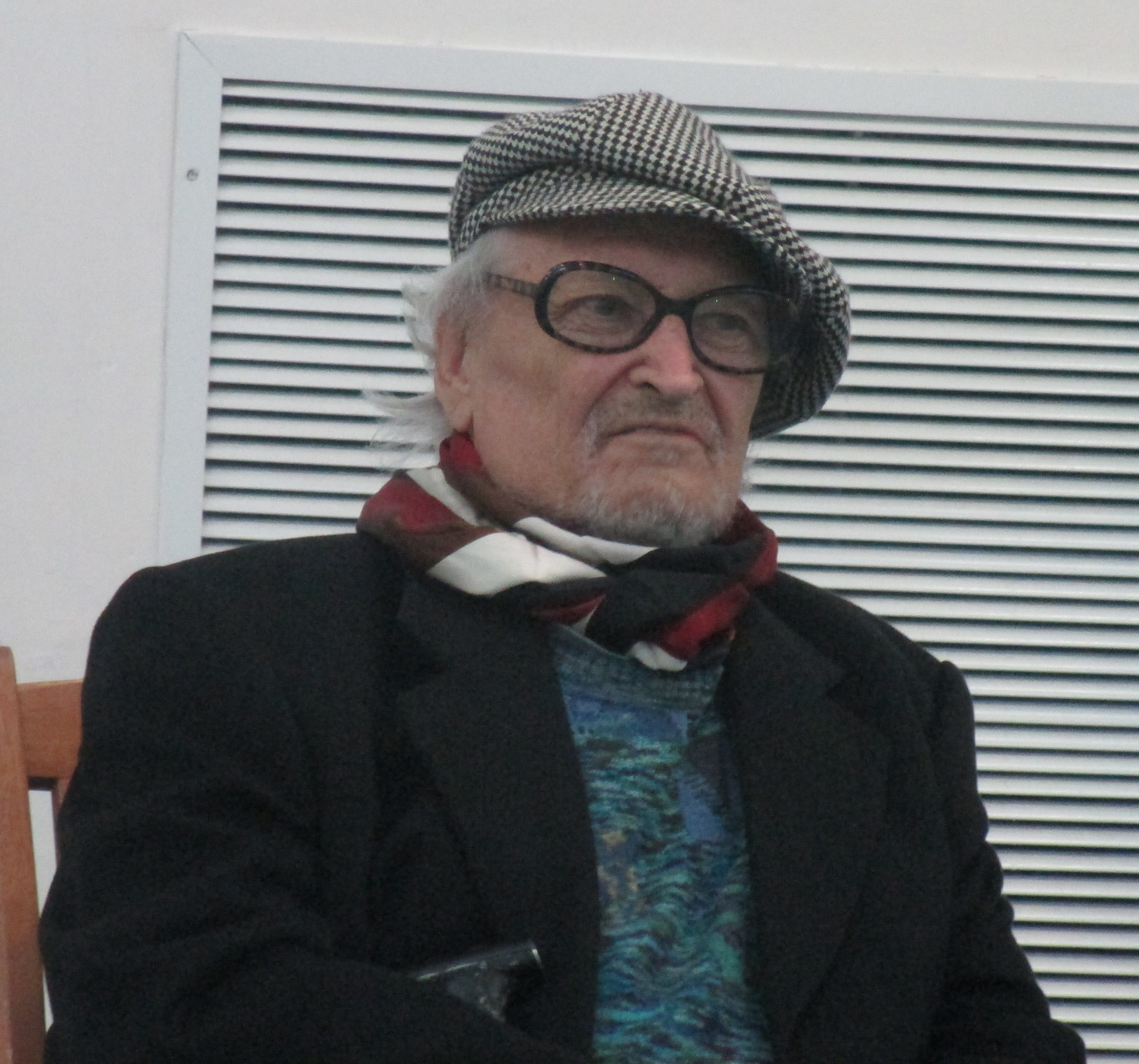
Valery Panov 2017

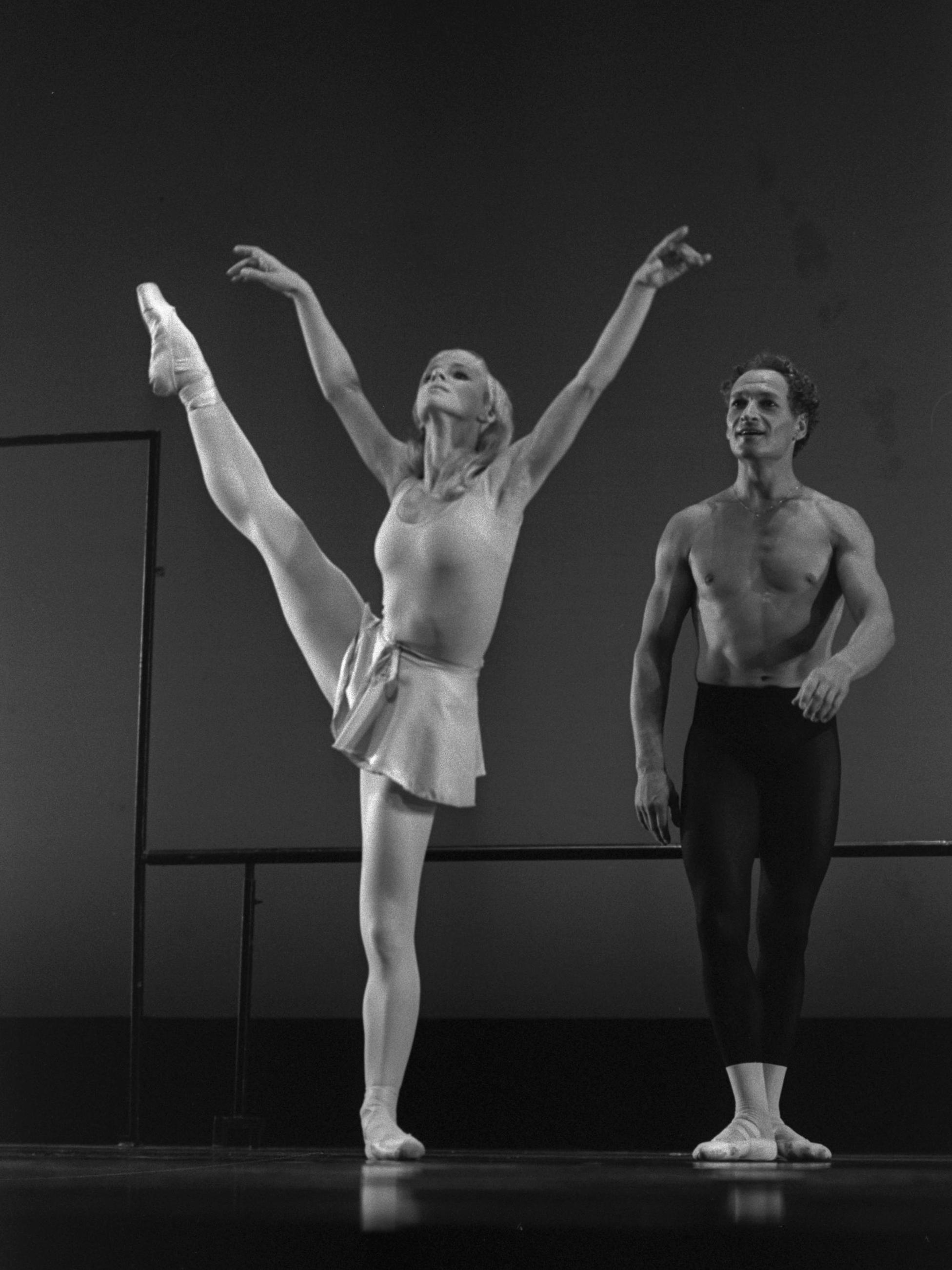
Valery and Galina Panov 1977

Valery Matveevich Panov (Russian: Валерий Матвеевич Панов; 12 March 1938 – 3 June 2025) was a Soviet dancer and choreographer. Born and raised in the Soviet Union, he trained in Leningrad and performed with the Kirov from 1964 to 1972. He and his second wife Galina, who was a ballerina at the Kirov, came to international attention in 1972 when they applied for exit visas to emigrate to Israel, which they were given in 1974. Panov worked with the Berlin Opera Ballet, as well as companies in other western European and North American countries, during the late 1970s and 1980s. He formed the Ashdod Art Centre in Israel, in 1993, and five years later founded the Panov Ballet Theatre, also in Ashdod.

== Early career ==
Valery Panov was born in Vitebsk, Byelorussian Soviet Socialist Republic (present-day Vitebsk, Belarus) in 1938. He studied at the Vaganova School in Leningrad, which is the present-day Academy of Russian Ballet, St. Petersburg. Panov attended the Moscow and Leningrad Ballet Schools, graduating from the latter in 1957.

He danced with the Maly Ballet in Leningrad (1957–64), where he created roles in Lopukhov's Ballad of Love (1959), in Davitashvili's Daphnis et Chloe (1960) and Bolero (1960), and in Boyarsky's Petrushka (1961), Orpheus (title role, 1962), and The Lady and the Hooligan (1962). In 1964 he joined the Kirov, where he remained until 1972. There he created roles in Jacobson's Land of Miracles (1967), Vinogradov's Gorianka (1968), Sergeyev's Hamlet (title role, 1970), and Kasatkina's and Vasiliev's Creation of the World (1971).

== Politics ==
Panov came to international attention when, in 1972, he and his second wife, Kirov ballerina Galina (née Ragozina), applied for exit visas to Israel. The Panovs were expelled from the Kirov, imprisoned briefly and forbidden from taking class for two years. Artists in the West (including Laurence Olivier) appealed to the authorities on their behalf. Finally, in 1974, the Panovs were allowed to leave the Soviet Union. They settled in Israel, making frequent guest appearances abroad as a couple. In Israel, the Panovs danced with the Bathsheva and Bat-Dor dance companies from 1974 to 1977.

== Choreographer ==
Panov was guest choreographer and principal dancer with the Berlin Opera Ballet between 1977 and 1983. There he choreographed several ballets, including Cinderella, The Rite of Spring, The Idiot, and War and Peace. He also staged Heart of the Mountain for the San Francisco Ballet (1976), Scheherazade and Petrushka for Vienna State Opera Ballet (1981), The Three Sisters for the Royal Swedish Ballet (1983), and Hamlet to music by Shostakovich for the Norwegian National Ballet (1984).

He was artistic director of the Royal Ballet of Flanders from 1984 to 1986, for whom he staged Romeo and Juliet and Moves. In 1988 he created Cléopâtre for the Istanbul Devlet Ballet.

On Broadway in 1983–84, Galina Panova succeeded Natalia Makarova, also a Soviet ballerina who had defected, in the Broadway revival of On Your Toes, for which Makarova had won a Tony Award.

In 1993 he founded the Ashdod Art Centre in Israel, a ballet troupe. Five years later he founded the Panov Ballet Theatre, also in Ashdod.

In 1998 he created the ballet Liebestod.

== Death ==
Panov died on 3 June 2025, at the age of 87.

== Autobiography ==
- To Dance (New York, 1978) ISBN 9780394498829

A musical theatre production of To Dance had its world premiere on 18–30 August 2015, at The New York International Fringe Festival. Book and lyrics are by Kyra Robinov and music is by Tibor Zonai. A review on the website Theatre is Easy called the production "a testimony to strong will, determination, and effort overcoming oppression and tyranny."

The musical had been under development since 2011, and was previewed at the Santa Fe Musical Theatre Festival in August 2014.

== Honors ==
- Valery Panov was awarded the Lenin Prize (1969).
- Valery Panov was an honorary citizen of New York City and San Francisco.

== See also ==
- List of Russian ballet dancers
