= Aaron Copland House =

Historic house in New York, United States

- U.S. National Register of Historic Places
- U.S. National Historic Landmark
- New York State Register of Historic Places
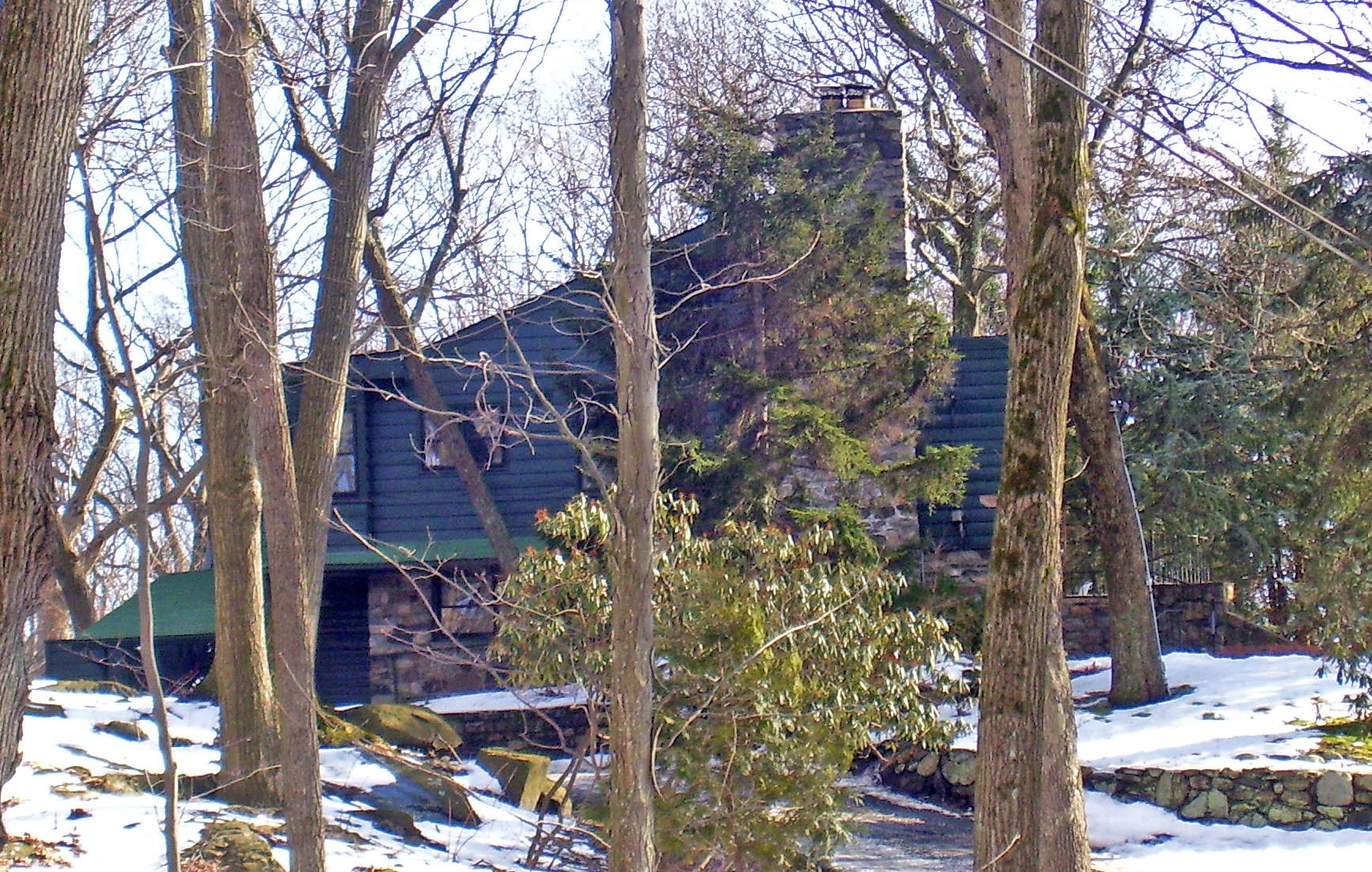
- North elevation, 2009

- Location within New York Location within the United States
- Location: Cortlandt Manor, NY
- Nearest city: Peekskill
- Coordinates: 41°14′24″N 73°54′9″W
- Area: 2 1/2 acres (1.0 ha)
- Built: 1940s
- Architectural style: Modern Movement
- NRHP reference No.: 03000245
- NYSRHP No.: 11902.000068

Significant dates
- Added to NRHP: September 19, 2003
- Designated NHL: October 6, 2008
- Designated NYSRHP: January 21, 2003

The Aaron Copland House, also known as Rock Hill or Copland House, is the former home of composer Aaron Copland for the last 30 years of his life, and now also a creative center for American music. Located on Washington Street in Cortlandt Manor, New York, United States, and built in the 1940s, the house and its garage were listed on the National Register of Historic Places in 2003, and five years later, in 2008, they were designated a National Historic Landmark, the only one in the country connected to a figure from the world of classical music. The grounds below Copland's home consist of a two-tiered garden ringed by natural woods, and in 2009, the National Wildlife Federation designated the property a Certified Wildlife Habitat.

Copland began retreating to the country during weekends and summers in the 1930s. He found the experience of rural living beneficial to his composing, and after a series of residences, purchased the modernist ranch-style house in the 1960s to live there full-time. Its style has been described as consistent with Copland's music. After his death in 1990, the Copland Heritage Association, now Copland House, Inc., was established to preserve the building.

Its composer-in-residence program, known as the Copland House Residency Awards, began in November 1998 and is an official project of the federal Save America's Treasures program. It awards six to nine emerging or mid-career American composers the opportunity to work and reside, one at a time, at Rock Hill. Composers who apply and are approved, are afforded three-to-eight-week stays in the house, with an allowance for food and the use of a car, while they work. They may share the house with spouses or partners, but not children or dogs. Allen Shearer was the first composer in residence in late 1998. Other previous winners include Pierre Jalbert, Richard Danielpour, Robert Xavier Rodriguez, Robert Paterson, Judith Lang Zaimont, Andrew Norman, Derek Bermel, Du Yun, Henry Threadgill, Alvin Singleton, Dave Douglas, Christopher Theofanidis, Jorge Villavicencio Grossmann and Hannah Lash.

In 1999, Copland House initiated its resident chamber ensemble Music From Copland House (MCH), the U.S.'s only wide-ranging American repertory ensemble, which made its debut at the Opening Night of Merkin Concert Hall’s 1999–2000 season.

In September 2009, Copland House at Merestead, the organization's regular mainstage concert series, was established at the historic Merestead Estate in Mount Kisco, New York.

== Buildings and grounds ==
The 2 1/2-acre (1.0-hectare) Rock Hill property is on the south side of Washington Street in the Town of Cortlandt, one mile (1.5 kilometers) east of the hamlet of Crugers on the Hudson River. Amalfi Drive circles around the rear. Its driveway is opposite Laura Court. The surrounding neighborhood is residential, with larger, newer houses on large lots amid the gently rolling, wooded terrain.

A curving driveway leads up from Washington Street, where a rock with metal letters spelling out "Rock Hill" and a plain white metal mailbox, to a parking area at the west. The wooded property has several landscaped areas and rock gardens scattered around it. Several species of trees uncommon to the area have been planted within.

The house itself is at the highest point of the property, a rock promontory in the middle of the wooded, terraced lot. It is a one-story, L-shaped timber frame structure on a stone and mortar foundation, exposed on the north and south sides, on the latter of which it projects several feet to accommodate Copland's studio, which has a wooden deck on the east side. Vertical clapboard siding rises to an asphalt roof, vaulted with a small flat area at the northwest corner. Stone chimneys rise on either end. There is a small kitchen wing on the northeast corner.

Fenestration consists primarily of picture windows arranged around the exterior. The projecting studio on the south side has glass walls on the south and west. On the west end, slate steps rise to a slate terrace, where the main entrance is located. A second stone stair rises from the parking area on the northwest to a wood staircase which ends at a secondary entrance on the kitchen wing.

Inside, the rectangular house has approximately 2,300 square feet (210 m^{2}) of floor space. It has six rooms altogether, divided by a full-length central hall. Each room has at least three windows, either double-hung sash or picture windows. On the walls is artwork from Copland's collection, primarily work of artists he was friends with.

The most significant of the rooms is the 17-by-24-foot (5.2 by 7.3 m) studio, with carpeted hardwood flooring, the dramatic views to the south and west through the glass walls, and bookshelves with much of Copland's personal library on the east side and a collection of recorded American music. Its main furnishing is Copland's grand piano, his work desk made for him by a local farmer, a wooden chair given to the composer by Harvard University and an upholstered armchair in which he was sometimes photographed.

Across the hallway is the 12-by-16-foot (3.7 by 4.9 m) master bedroom. It has a queen-size bed with two adjoining tables and lamps and plaster walls. In bookshelves under the windows are Copland's collections of music journals, dating back to the September 1924 issue of The Musical Quarterly, which had Copland's first published article. The adjacent similarly sized library has full-height bookshelves, some of which are large enough to hold full scores of compositions by Copland and the composers who have resided here since. There are also regular books on music and other subjects from Copland's collection. Its walls are otherwise covered in textured wallpaper from Copland's residency.

At the west end of the hall is the living room. It is sided in vertical knotty pine paneling and has a large fireplace, as well as several chairs of Copland's and a dining area. To its north, the kitchen wing has linoleum flooring and ridged wood paneling and drywall. It houses several kitchen appliances and a small table and chair set.

Elsewhere on the central hallway are guest bedrooms and bathrooms. Stairs lead from the kitchen wing down to the partially finished basement. Copland and his assistants used the rooms there for archival and office purposes.

Near the house is a two-story garage with an attached one-bedroom apartment. It is similar in exterior and interior styling to the main house. It has not been altered since Copland's time, and is considered a contributing resource to the property's historic character.

== History ==
Born in Brooklyn, Copland lived in cities for the early years of his professional life. After returning from three years in Paris in 1927, his career as a composer and critic took off. He traveled widely, but always returned to New York City, where he lived near what is now Lincoln Center on the Upper West Side.

As a boy, he had spent one summer at a camp in Pennsylvania's Pocono Mountains, an experience he recalled fondly in his later autobiography. The experience and the memory began leading him to spend some time each summer in the countryside outside of the city. Starting in 1929 with a month in Briarcliff Manor, it grew into six months the next year, when Copland and his then-partner Gerard Sykes took up residence in another Westchester County country town, Bedford. During that stay, he finished his early Piano Variations.

Later years of the 1930s took him to other country towns, such as Woodstock; Ridgefield, Connecticut; and Bernardsville, New Jersey. Every time, he found the experience had a beneficial effect on his composing. In 1947 he realized he would have to have a country place of his own, and took out a three-year rental on a Colonial-era house in the Rockland County hamlet of Palisades. He found it the perfect balance between the country life he desired and the proximity to the city he needed.

After two years as a visiting professor at Harvard and then Tanglewood Music Center, Copland in 1952 bought his first house, Shady Lane Farm in Ossining. There, he wrote more of the works that defined his middle career, such as the Orchestral Variations and the opera The Tender Land. By 1960, he had outgrown it, and began looking for another country home.

Victor Kraft, his partner at that time, found Rock Hill. It had been designed by a local architect 20 years earlier. "One look at the grounds," Copland said, "and I was sold! When I first saw the studio I said it looked like a room where a composer could write music." His datebook for November 1, 1960, the day he closed on the house, proudly proclaims "HOUSE BOUGHT!" He lived there for the rest of his life.

The house's aesthetics complement Copland's music. Both have what one writer calls his "simplicity, quiet dignity and rugged elegance." It blends well into the surrounding natural environment, with its prominent exterior wood (painted dark green) and stone. The stone foundation seems to blend seamlessly into the natural rock ledge underneath. The large picture windows connect the interior of the house to the surrounding woods. His only significant change was the 1962 addition of the guest apartment on the garage.

Copland maintained a regular daily schedule. He awoke, had a light breakfast, and took care of his correspondence in the morning. After lunch he received visitors, including the many younger composers he aided over the years, a personal generosity that led to him being called "The Dean of American Composers". Dinner would come in the evening, and only at night, when he felt it was better to do so, did he actually compose. In this way he composed Connotations and Inscape, large orchestral works for the New York Philharmonic, and Duo for Flute and Piano, his last major work, in 1971. Shortly after moving in he wrote his last film score, for the 1961 independent film Something Wild. In his later years Rock Hill served primarily as a base for his travels, which included many appearances guest-conducting his work at performances all over the world, and receiving honorary degrees and awards.

In the late 1980s his health declined, and he was unable to keep to his previous schedule. He died at a hospital in nearby North Tarrytown late in 1990. By then the house was showing signs of neglect. The roof was failing, structural wood had begun to rot and the heating system was not running properly, among other problems.

The Copland Heritage Association, newly formed to manage the house, decided to sell it. But residents of the Town of Cortlandt organized a grassroots effort to save it. As a result, the association was able to raise the $150,000 necessary for repairs. The town worked out an arrangement where it owns the house and leases it to the Copland Heritage Association (now Copland House, Inc.) for $1 a year. Once that was concluded, the Aaron Copland Fund for Music, executor of the composer's estate, and the town worked out the details of the composer-in-residence program.

Under the program, American composers who apply and are approved get three-to-eight-week stays in the house, with an allowance for food and the use of a car, while they work. They may share the house with spouses or partners, but not children or dogs. Allen Shearer was the first composer in residence in late 1998. Others have included Richard Danielpour, Derek Bermel, Robert Paterson, Michael Brown, Michael Gilbertson, Joel Hoffman, and Judith Lang Zaimont.

== See also ==
- List of National Historic Landmarks in New York
- National Register of Historic Places listings in northern Westchester County, New York
