= Piano Concerto (Copland) =

Piano concerto by Aaron Copland

The Concerto for Piano and Orchestra is a musical composition by the American composer Aaron Copland. The work was commissioned by the conductor Serge Koussevitzky who was then music director of the Boston Symphony Orchestra. It was first performed on January 28, 1927, by the Boston Symphony Orchestra conducted by Koussevitzky with the composer himself as the soloist. The piece is dedicated to Copland's patron Alma Morgenthau Wertheim.

== Composition ==
=== Background ===
Copland completed work on the piano concerto in November 1926. It is cast in two connected movements: a short, slow first movement, with a tempo marking of Andante sostenuto, and a large, fast second movement, marked as Molto moderato (molto rubato). Like George Gershwin's Rhapsody in Blue (composed two years prior), the piece demonstrates an early use of jazz and blues in an orchestral setting.

=== Instrumentation ===
The work is scored for piano and a large orchestra consisting of two flutes, piccolo, two oboes, cor anglais, two clarinets, E-flat clarinet, bass clarinet, alto saxophone (doubling soprano saxophone), two bassoons, contrabassoon, four horns, three trumpets, three trombones, tuba, five percussionists, celesta, and strings.

== Reception ==
The piano concerto was not a critical success upon its premiere and remained virtually unperformed for three decades. The piece was nevertheless admired by the conductor Leonard Bernstein, who featured it in the New York Philharmonic's Young People's Concerts and later produced the first recording of the concerto with the New York Philharmonic and Copland again performing the piano part. In 2008, the music critic Peter Dickinson of Gramophone reflected, "The first of its two movements is a spacious outpouring of fanfares and blues and the second is a crazy kind of supercharged ragtime that really upset the Boston audience and critics. It shows how Copland exploited the jazz age to brilliant effect."
