= The Old Cat and the Young Mouse =

Fable by Jean de la Fontaine

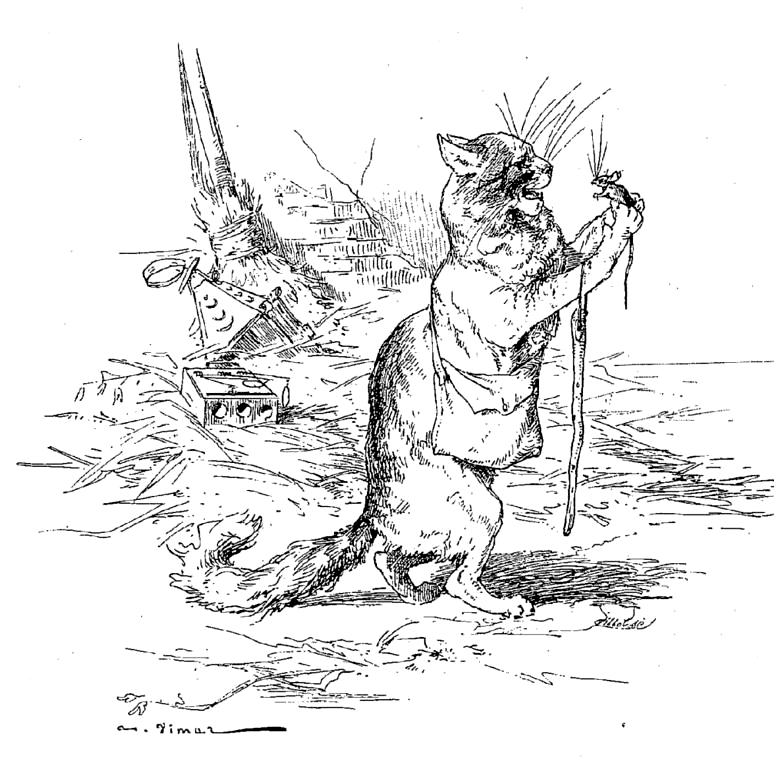
Auguste Vimar's illustration of the fable from an 1897 edition

The Old Cat and the Young Mouse (Le vieux chat et la jeune souris) is a late fable by Jean de la Fontaine (XII.5). Written towards the end of his life, its grim conclusion is that 'Youth thinks its every wish will gain success; Old age is pitiless.'

La Fontaine prefaces his poem with a dedication to the young Duke of Burgundy, who had asked the poet for a fable on a cat and mouse theme. At that period the young prince was accounted arrogant and self-willed and the tale demonstrates that one cannot always have one's own way. A mouse, caught by an experienced cat, begs for her life, arguing that at present she is small and would be better left to fatten and make a meal for the cat's offspring. He replies that such conduct goes against his nature; his children will feed themselves without his help.

The story relates to two earlier fables by La Fontaine. It contrasts with The Cat and an Old Rat (III.18), in which an experienced rat is too canny to be taken in by a cat's tricks and takes care to address it at a distance. In The fisherman and the little fish (V.3), however, a young carp makes almost the same appeal when it is caught - and with as little success.

Two composers have adapted the fable to piano pieces in which the contrasting themes of hunter and hunted play against each other. Heitor Villa-Lobos' O gato e o rato dates from 1914 and is all that remains of a lost suite, Fábulas características (Typical Tales). He would have come across the fable in João Cardoso de Meneses e Sousa's Rio de Janeiro translation of 1886. Aaron Copland's "The Cat and the Mouse" was written six years later, when the young composer was studying in Paris, and became his first work to be published.
