= The Cat and the Mouse =

Composition by the American classical music composer Aaron Copland

The Cat and The Mouse is a composition by the American classical music composer Aaron Copland. The first of his works to be published, it was written shortly before he began his schooling in Paris, France in 1921. It was based on Jean de la Fontaine's fable of The Old Cat and the Young Mouse and bears a resemblance to the slightly earlier O gato e o rato by Brazilian composer Heitor Villa-Lobos.
