= Gebrauchsmusik =

German term for musical works composed for utilitarian purposes

Gebrauchsmusik (German pronunciation: [ɡəˈbʁaʊ̯xsmuˌziːk]) is a German term, meaning "utility music", for music that exists not only for its own sake, but which was composed for some specific, identifiable purpose. This purpose can be a particular historical event, like a political rally or a military ceremony, or it can be more general, as with music written to accompany dance, or music written for amateurs or students to perform.

While composer Paul Hindemith is probably the figure most identified with this expression, it seems to have been coined within the realm of musicology rather than composition. In the late 19th and early 20th centuries, the modern academic discipline of musicology was formulated by a mainly German group of scholars who were interested not only in formal development and biographical data, but also to an extent in the sociopolitical position of music throughout history, and the relationship of music and musicians to society at large.

== Paul Nettl's view of dance music ==
Perhaps the first such musicologist to use the word Gebrauchsmusik was Paul Nettl, who employed it in reference to half of his perceived binarism between that 17th-century dance music which was in fact danced to, and that which was written in dance forms but was actually abstract music intended only for listening (by extension, this duality applied to the dichotomy between any music for a specific purpose, Gebrauchsmusik, and that for none but the pleasure or edification of listening, Vortragsmusik).

Nettl arrived at this dual-development view of dance music through his observation that such pieces began, as the century progressed, to use stylistic and formal devices that were farther from the province of simple utility and more aligned with some anticipation of a listening audience paying full attention. The period's emerging binary dance form featured such characteristics as an increasing tonicization of foreign keys, an increasingly explicit and emphasized dominant-tonic tonal axis, and a refined delicacy of ornamentation, all of which would seem superfluous in application to a music intended only as the rhythmic accompaniment to physical activity. In addition to these developments in the individual movements, they were organized into ever more extended and stylized suites, which greatly resembled other instrumental forms of the day. Indeed, the mature sonata da camera is virtually indistinguishable from the dance suite of the time.

Nettl saw in this situation a clear distinction between music that was intended mainly to be in the service of dancers, and that which was mainly intended to service the ideals of art. In articulating this distinction, however, Nettl did not imply that utility music was unimportant artistically. Instead, he pointed out the importance of social need or desire as a catalyst for artistic development.

== Heinrich Besseler's thesis ==
Two years later, also discussing the 17th-century suite (in Beiträge zur Stilgeschichte der deutschen Suite im 17. Jahrhundert) Heinrich Besseler went a step further, to imply that such utility music was socially superior, if not artistically so. For Besseler, "aesthetic access" (Zugangsweise) to the dance music was gained through participation, be it playing, dancing, or even singing along, rather than mere listening. He further expounded this thesis in a 1925 article on motets of the Medieval period, in which he proposed that such works had not been designed for the enjoyment of listeners, but with only their devotional purpose in mind; this purpose would only be fulfilled through participation, whether performance or prayer. In making this point, Besseler sought to divide all music into two distinct categories, continuing to use the word Gebrauchsmusik for one, and likening this to vernacular language, while replacing Nettl's word for the other with eigenständige Musik—alone-standing, or autonomous music. Besseler had studied philosophy with Martin Heidegger, and thought that this musical duality reflected Heidegger's between "thing" and "equipment", for the autonomous and the specific-purposed, respectively.

== Politicization and decline ==
It was Besseler's notion of this concept which took hold in German musical culture of the 1920s and 1930s, becoming something of a controversy within that sphere, and even spilling into political ideology. Such a distinction had always existed in music, and that some works had always been composed for specific occasions and others not (at least since the Renaissance, in all probability), is attested to by the work of Besseler and Nettl, who based their concepts on studies of the historical situation. Even so, the musicologically conceived term Gebrauchsmusik somehow came to be construed as a concept of modern political administration. Some composers and government officials identified a need for community music, to be played by amateurs and young people at large festivals; the long German tradition of community singing benefited greatly from this impulse. Hindemith, Kurt Weill, and many others contributed works with such intentions in mind as the fledgling Weimar Republic tried to stave off collapse. The cultural, rather than solely political, nature of this movement will be seen, however, from the observation that Hindemith was for the most part a political agnostic, while Weill was an avowed leftist. Composers, regardless of their political views, were largely in favor of the Gebrauchsmusik concept at its outset because a recognized need and desire for occasion-tailored works would lead to a constant call for them. All combatants in the political arena saw in community music-making a potential glue with which to unite the German people behind their respective agendas; rather than expend the often wasted effort of regaling them with rhetoric, left and right alike could simply awe the public with spectacle and envelop them in the ecstasy of art. The right wing took Gebrauchsmusik as a tool when the former began its ascendancy, which is probably the main reason for the latter's increased discredit and abandonment as the decade progressed, and the most important German artists and thinkers departed for more hospitable locales.

A second reason, though, for this discredit was the occurrence to certain composers and their followers that composing music for large-scale public use would lead to a need for them to pander as well to large-scale public taste. Such a concept was anathematic to the art-for-art's-sake ideal which followed alongside that of community music in Germany since the days of Beethoven, who had ushered in the era of the well-regarded and financially successful free-lance composer. Schoenberg wrote to the effect that Gebrauchsmusik would hardly outlive its present-day application, while that composed for art and no other purpose would have the only chance at immortality. Schoenberg also noted that there had been less and less call for such utility music since the end of the Republic anyway, and certainly since the conclusion of the war. As a result of this, Gebrauchsmusik's most ardent promoters had again become "ideal artists". Earlier, the critic Theodor W. Adorno had called the work of Hindemith and other Gebrauchsmusiker symptomatic of "false [social] consciousness", and condemned it as being not truly useful at all, due to what he considered its lack of emotional content. By the late 1950s, Gebrauchsmusik had become almost universally a term of insult, especially among composers. Hindemith himself attempted, somewhat, to back away from it, when in a lecture at Harvard in 1950, he said that "quite obviously music for which no use can be found, that is to say, useless music, is not entitled to public consideration anyway and consequently the Gebrauch is taken for granted", and also that "to this day it has been impossible to kill the silly term and the unscrupulous classification that goes with it".

== See also ==
- Occasional poetry
- Program music
