= Dance Panels =

1959 ballet by Aaron Copland

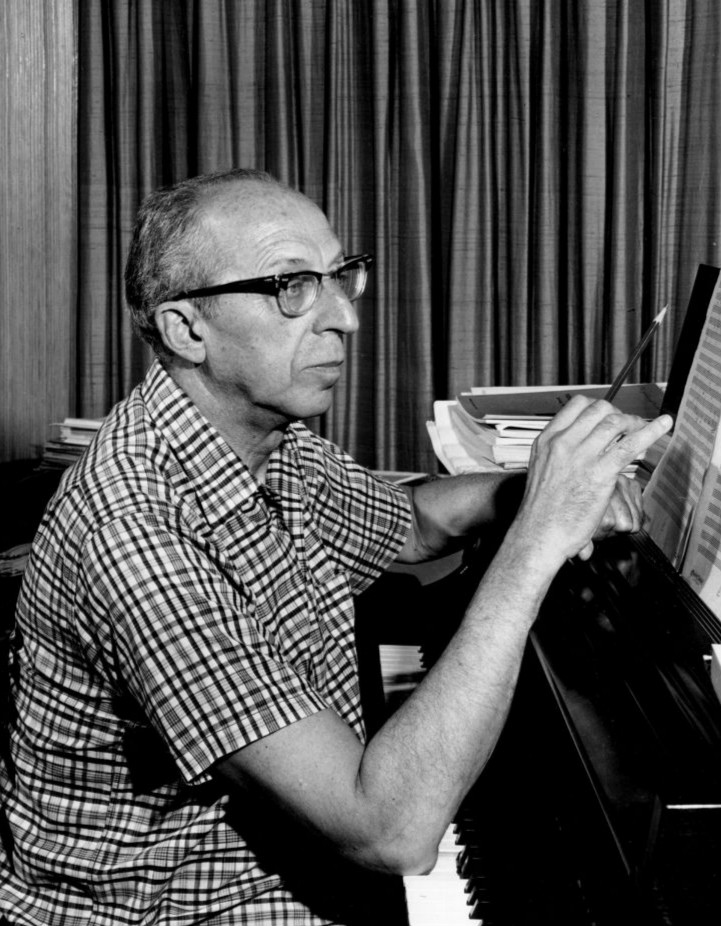
Aaron Copland in 1962

Dance Panels is a ballet composed by Aaron Copland in 1959 for a planned collaboration with choreographer Jerome Robbins. After Copland had written the score, Robbins reneged on his commitment and the performance did not take place. Three years later, Copland revised the score for a ballet by the Bavarian State Opera in Munich, Germany, where it premiered on 3 December 1963. The ballet was performed by the New York City Ballet in 1965 and the concert version received its first performance at the Ojai Music Festival the following year. According to Copland biographer Howard Pollack, Dance Panels has proven from a musical standpoint one of the composer's more accessible late scores. While some of its more dissonant moments sound similar to Copland's twelve-tone compositions, other parts recall his earlier stage and screen music. It is also the only one of Copland's six ballets not written to a specific program.

== Background ==
Aaron Copland wrote Dance Panels in 1959 on a commission from Jerome Robbins and his "Ballets: U.S.A." company. This company was sponsored through the American National Theatre and Academy (ANTA), a United States government agency set up to represent American art abroad. According to Pollack, Robbins had wanted to work with Copland on a ballet since 1944, following his Broadway success with Leonard Bernstein's ballet Fancy Free, and had a proposed a similar scenario to Copland at that time. In Copland Since 1943, the composer dates their desire to collaborate on a ballet at 1954, when Robbins directed the premiere of his opera The Tender Land at the New York City Opera. At the beginning of 1959, Robbins suggested two options to Copland, a ballet based on The Dybbuk and a non-programmatic ballet. Copland opted for the latter. Robbins then volunteered an outline that he tentatively called Theatre Waltzes:

The originating idea is to do a ballet with presents the style, youth, technical competence, theatrical qualities and personalities of the company [Ballets: U.S.A.] in pure dance terms. The technique is essentially classic ballet (in the way that Americans employ it) and to make the whole ballet a declarative statement—open, positive, inventive, joyous (rather than introspective)—a parade; a presentation; perhaps elegant, witty, tender and with a sure technique.

The ballet should be a chamber work in effect, both on stage as well as in the pit: the form, number of people and the quality of the atmosphere intimate and clear. It should say, this is Dance; it's the way we use our European heritage (classic technique) in America.

At the top of his proposal to Copland, Robbins wrote, "These are only ideas," Pollack writes that the choreographer "went on to suggest over twenty different types of waltzes, including 'circus waltz' and 'tea-room waltz'; at the same time, he recognizes the advantages of working with 'more abstract and evocative' forms."

Copland finished the ballet in early 1959, in the hope the work would be premiered at that year's Spoleto Festival in Florence, Italy. However, Robbins, to the dismay of ANTA, decided not to stage Dance Panels. While the choreographer claimed at the time that he did not receive the full score until the day before the troupe was to leave for Italy, both he and the composer had found the music had not turned out as either person had anticipated. Robbins later wrote that the score was "much more serious and difficult than I had expected....I realized that because of fatigue from my work on [the musical] Gypsy...it would be foolhardy to attempt it if I rushed into rehearsal without assimilating the score."

Copland wrote that Dance Panels "sat on the shelf" until the Bavarian State Opera approached him in 1962 for a ballet to stage at the opening of their new house that November. Once that offer came, the composer revised the score, partly in hope that Robbins could still choreograph it. Robbins again refused.

== Composition ==
=== Instrumentation ===
In keeping with Robbins' request for an intimate setting, Copland scored Dance Panels initially for six woodwinds and five brass. Even when he revised the score, the composer kept, in his words, to "a moderate-sized orchestra of six woodwinds, five brass, two percussion (but no timpani) and strings."

=== Form ===
A typical performance of the ballet version lasts approximately 30 minutes. The concert version lasts 23 minutes. The music in both versions is "essentially the same," Copland says; the difference in performance time arises from the number of extended pauses in the first section when the music is danced.

The ballet is divided into seven sections, played without pause.

1. Introduction: Moderato. A quiet opening with long sustained notes, written in a slow waltz tempo.
2. Allegretto con tenerezza. A continuation of the waltz rhythm, with "charm and delicacy, involvements, hesitations and swirlings."
3. Scherzando. Light and transparent.
4. Pas de trois. Marked "Somewhat hesitant, melancholic and naive."
5. Con brio. Another scherzo-like section, infused, as Copland phrased it "by brisk rhythms and jazzy drum patterns."
6. Con moto. A brief lyrical interlude, marked "menacing" and later "eloquent."
7. Molto ritmico. The finale begins, according to Copland, "by suggesting flight and hectic emotions.". Written in jagged, irregular rhythms, the music is alternately joyous and frenetic. It ends quietly with material similar to the opening of the piece.

Overall, Copland called the music "simple and direct.... The lyrical parts are very diatonic ... while the lively and bouncy parts have more complexity of texture." In Music Since 1900, musicologist Nicolas Slonimsky notes the work as "built in a translucidly intricate polyphonic reticle." Pollack points out that, while the composer acceded to Robbins' demand for music based on waltzes, he employed a stylized approach, which gave the vague feeling of the dance rather than an overt evocation.

=== Significance of title ===
The ballet was variously titled Music for J.R., Music for a Ballet, The Dream and Ballet in Seven Movements before Copland settled upon Dance Panels: Ballet in Seven Sections. The idea for the final title, Copland said, was from the ballet being in seven continuous sections, "like the panels on a screen."

=== Resemblance to other Copland works ===
Dance Panels, Copland writes, is different from his earlier ballets—"more abstract ... lyrical and slower in tempo than most of my other ballet music." he also claimed he did not use any American folk melodies in it, though two sections contained aspects of "the quiet sentimental song and a type of stage music used for 'tap dancing.'" Butterworth writes that, while the second section "is one [of] the few passages similar to the pastoral movements in the three 'cowboy' ballets," no melodic or harmonic material elsewhere in the work resembles a Western setting The quasi-folk songs and country dances indicative of those works, he adds, are likewise absent. However, a passing resemblance to the fifth movement, Jingo, of Copland's Statements for orchestra, occurs in the third section.

Pollack calls Dance Panels one "of the most accessible scores of [Copland's] later years." He adds that some sections are reminiscent of the composer's earlier stage and screen music, while others seem to presage Copland's 12-tone scores such as Connotations and Inscape in their thick textures and harmonic dissonance.

== Reception ==
Copland conducted the world premiere of Dance Panels on December 3, 1963 at the Bavarian State Opera. While the work "was greeted with great applause," the composer was disappointed with the choreography by Heintz Rosen. He said he felt Rosen lacked "feeling for the American quality of the music." George Balanchine considered choreographing the work for its United States premiere with the New York City Ballet but eventually gave the task to his assistant, John Taras. Since Taras knew the composer was open to having the ballet mounted either with or without a story, he adopted one by Scott Burton. In it, two lovers meet in a cemetery, where their dancing is interrupted by various others buried there. Titled Shadow'd Ground, the work was performed at the then-new Lincoln Center on January 21, 1965. It was neither a popular nor critical success.

Copland remained concerned how the music would fare unstaged. The concert premiere, under Ingolf Dahl and the Ojai Festival Orchestra on May 24, 1966, proved this fear unfounded. Pollack writes, "As a concise, plotless, beautifully crafted ballet ... Dance Panels easily accommodated itself to the concert format" and enjoyed "considerably more success than it has on the stage." It has since been recorded under the direction of Leonard Slatkin, Dennis Russell Davies and the composer himself.
