= Victor Kraft (photographer) =

American professional photographer (1915–1976)

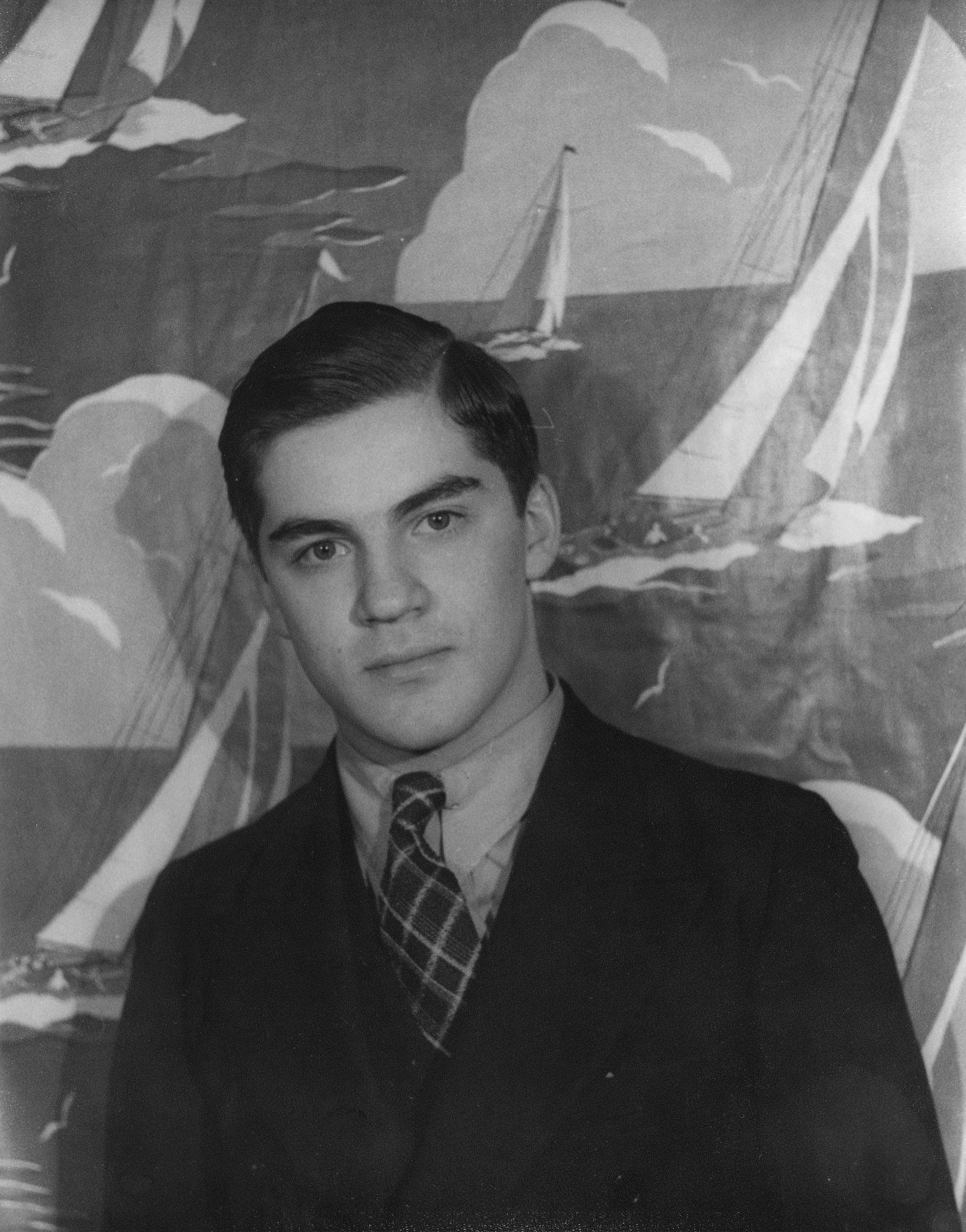
Victor Kraft, 1935, by Carl Van Vechten

Victor Hugo Etler Kraftsov, known as Victor Kraft (August 8, 1915 – July 2, 1976), was an American professional photographer and lifelong friend and lover of Aaron Copland.

== Early life ==
Victor Kraft was born Victor Hugo Etler on August 8, 1915, in Oneonta, New York, the son of Samuel Etler (born in New York City) and Bella Kraftsov (emigrated from Alexandrovsk, Russia).

Kraft attended Public School 19 and DeWitt Clinton High School. He was a violinist prodigy and gave concerts as a child, later attending Juilliard School. He studied composition under Roger Sessions. He left music to pursue photography at the urging of Aaron Copland.

Kraft and Copland met in 1932, when Kraft was 16 years old, and had a close relationship until Kraft's death in 1976. Copland called Kraft his "pupil, companion, secretary and friend."

In 1936, Kraft studied photography at the Santuario de Ocotlan in Tlaxcala and from December 1936 to April 1937 he covered the Spanish Civil War as a photojournalist for Louis Aragon's Ce Soir.

== Career ==
Victor Kraft contributed photographs to prominent publications such as Life Magazine, Harper's Bazaar, Junior Bazaar, The New York Times, Look and the French art journal L'Oeil.

His portraits include, in addition to Aaron Copland, composers and performers of the American music scene, including Leonard Bernstein, Paul Bowles, Edwin Denby, Lukas Foss, Erik Johns, William Kapell, Dimitri Mitropoulos, and Robert Shaw.

He also documented the Tanglewood Music Festival in the 1940s.

During World War II, he studied under Margaret Bourke-White and managed a concert tour for Prince George Chavchavadze. From 1945 to 1947, he worked for Harper's Bazaar, but he did not like it and was fired.

Throughout his career as a photographer, Kraft was also paid by Copland to be his secretary and chauffeur, and they lived together at Bernardsville, Ridgefield, Sneden's Landing, Ossining and Cortlandt Manor. They also traveled to Bemidji, Hollywood, Mexico and Cuba.

A handsome man, with dark brown hair and blue-gray eyes, Kraft posed for George Platt Lynes, Cecil Beaton and Carl Van Vechten.

== Personal life ==
The relationship between Copland and Kraft remained unknown to the general public until Copland's death in 1990. When Leonard Bernstein urged an aging Copland to come out, Copland replied: "I think I'll leave that to you, boy."

Victor Kraft traveled in Mexico in the 1930s and in Brazil from 1951 to 1953.

In 1951, Kraft married Pearl Kazin, writer and sister of Alfred Kazin, a literary critic. The marriage lasted a few months. In 1960 Kraft married Rheba Robinson, a nurse. They moved to Croton-on-Hudson and Kraft found a house for Copland in nearby Cortlandt Manor. Copland was the godfather of Kraft's only child, Jeremy Aaron, who was mentally handicapped. Kraft did not accept the situation and in 1968 he left his wife and took Jeremy with him, traveling around the world for eight years.

Kraft died of a heart attack on July 2, 1976, and Jeremy returned to live with his mother. When Copland died in 1990, he left $25,000, equivalent to $61,600 in 2025, to Jeremy's mother, "to be used for the support and maintenance of my godson, Jeremy Aaron Kraft", the largest sum he left to anyone, aside from his secretary, David Walker.
