= In the Beginning (Copland) =

1947 choral work by Aaron Copland

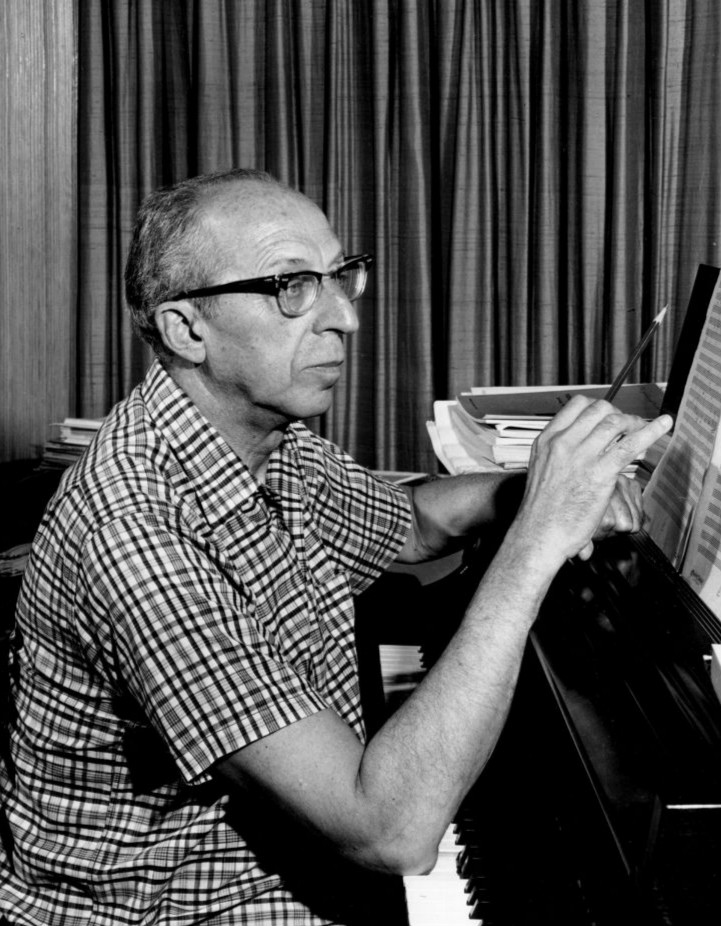
Aaron Copland in 1962

In the Beginning is a 1947 choral work by Aaron Copland setting Genesis 1:1 to 2:7. The 15–20 minute long work is for mixed four-part chorus a capella and soprano or mezzo-soprano solo. The work is evocative of the Hebrew davening and shows the influence of polytonality with references to jazz and blues. In the Beginning was composed for Harvard University's Symposium on Music Criticism in May 1947. The premiere was performed by the Collegiate Chorale at the Harvard Memorial Church, Cambridge on May 2 of that year, conducted by Robert Shaw.

== Recordings ==
- Martha Lipton (mezzo-soprano) In the Beginning Leonard Bernstein Sony
- Ameral Gunson (mezzo-soprano) King's College Choir of Cambridge Stephen Cleobury, EMI 1991 (reissued by Warner on Copland: Billy the Kid, Rodeo & In the Beginning Saint Louis Symphony Orchestra Leonard Slatkin)
- Catherine Denley, on American Choral Music. with Barber: Agnus Dei, Bernstein: Chichester Psalms, Corydon Singers, Matthew Best Hyperion
- Sally Bruce-Payne (mezzo-soprano) on In the Beginning. with Barber: Agnus Dei. Dunedin Consort Ben Parry Linn 2001
- Beth Mackay (mezzo-soprano) on In the Beginning Choir of Merton College, Oxford, Benjamin Nicholas & Peter Phillips Delphian
- Susanne Mentzer (mezzo-soprano) on American Choral Music Volume 1 with Corigliano, Foss, Ives and Persichetti The University of Texas Chamber Singers and Chamber Orchestra, James Morrow Naxos American Classics - 8559299
- Twentieth Century Masters Volume 3 - The American School The Choir of New College Oxford, Edward Higginbottom Avie
- Frances Bourne (mezzo-soprano) In the Beginning Gloucester Cathedral Choir, Andrew Nethsingha Avie
- D'Anna Fortunato (mezzo-soprano) An American Collage Bucknell University Rooke Chapel Choir, William Payn Albany
