= Night-Thoughts (piano piece) =

Piece for piano solo written by Aaron Copland in 1972

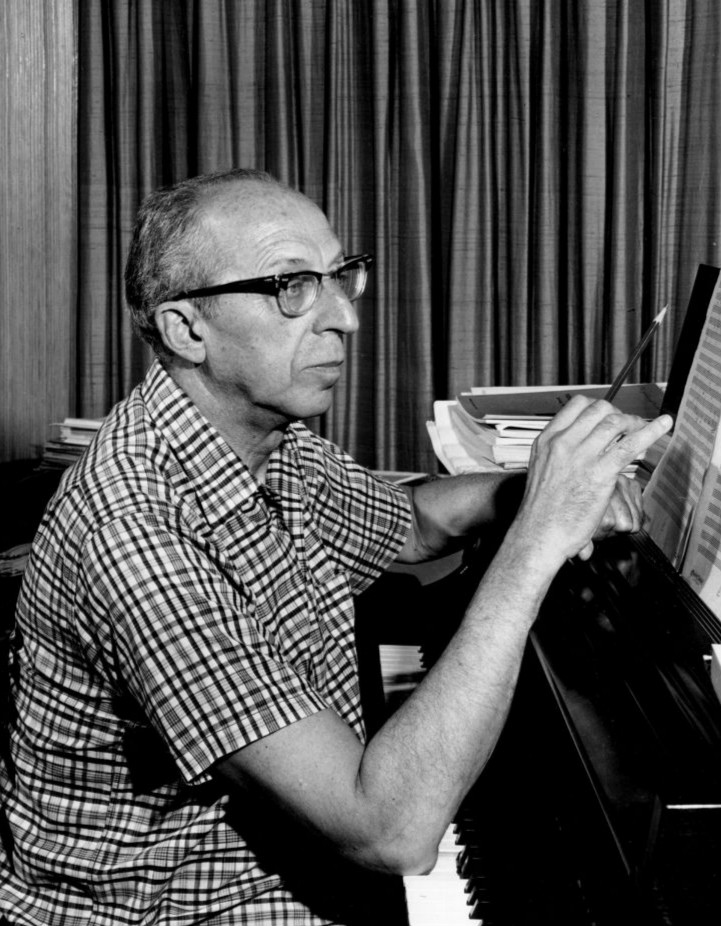
Aaron Copland in 1962

Night-Thoughts is a piece for piano solo written by Aaron Copland in 1972 for the fourth Van Cliburn International Piano Competition.

The piece is subtitled "Homage to Ives". It is about eight minutes long.

The subtitle was added after the Copland had written the piece. According to the composer, "[t]his has not prevented performers and critics from finding Ivesian allusions in the music". In particular, a horn-call motif at the beginning of the piece has been linked to the opening of Ives' The Unanswered Question.
