= The Red Pony (Aaron Copland song) =

1949 film score composed by Aaron Copland

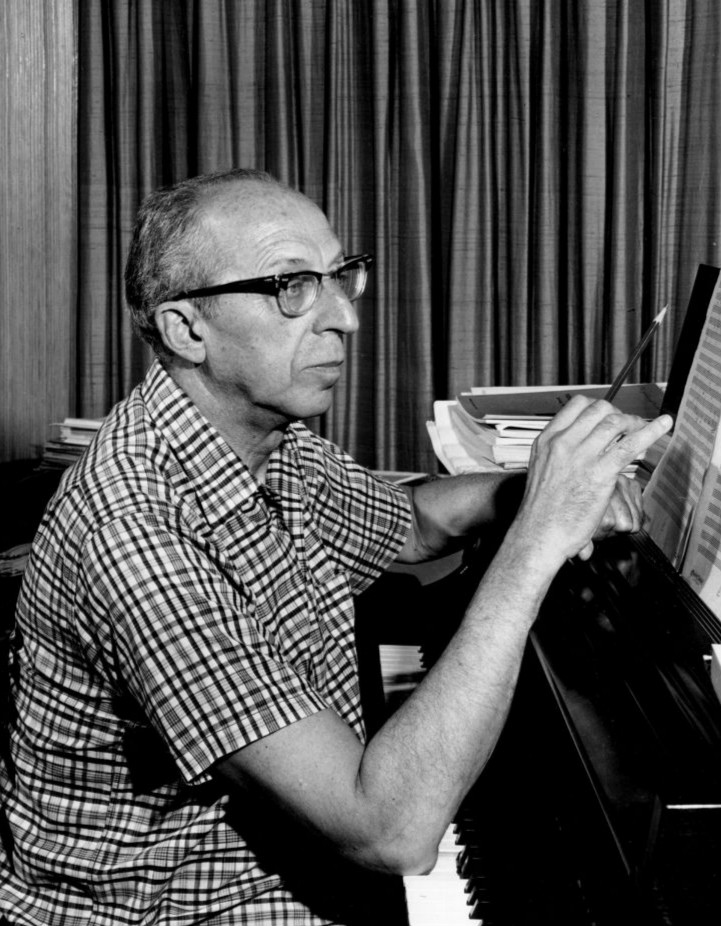
Aaron Copland in 1962 from a television special

The Red Pony is a film score composed for Lewis Milestone's 1949 production which used John Steinbeck's screenplay based on his 1937 book, The Red Pony. It was composed by Aaron Copland in 1948 at Republic Pictures and an LP was issued of the soundtrack.

The orchestral suite, originally arranged by Copland for the Houston Symphony Orchestra, lasts approximately 20–25 minutes and consists of six separate pieces:

- "Morning on the Ranch"
- "The Gift"
- "Dream March and Circus Music"
- "Walk to the Bunkhouse"
- "Grandfather's Story"
- "Happy Ending"

The premiere of the suite in Houston was on October 30, 1948. In 1966, Copland transcribed selections from the orchestral suite for band.
