= Tank Girl (film) =

1995 film directed by Rachel Talalay

- Theatrical release poster
- Directed by: Rachel Talalay
- Screenplay by: Tedi Sarafian
- Based on: Tank Girl by: Alan Martin; Jamie Hewlett
- Produced by: Richard B. Lewis; Pen Densham; John Watson
- Starring: Lori Petty; Ice-T; Naomi Watts; Malcolm McDowell
- Cinematography: Gale Tattersall
- Edited by: James R. Symons
- Music by: Graeme Revell
- Production companies: United Artists; Trilogy Entertainment Group
- Distributed by: MGM/UA Distribution Co. (United States); United International Pictures (International)
- Release date: March 31, 1995 (United States)
- Running time: 104 minutes
- Country: United States
- Language: English
- Budget: $25 million
- Box office: $6 million

Tank Girl is a 1995 American post-apocalyptic science fiction film directed by Rachel Talalay and written by Tedi Sarafian. Based on the British comics series created by Jamie Hewlett and Alan Martin, the film stars Lori Petty, Naomi Watts, Ice-T, and Malcolm McDowell. Set in a drought ravaged Australia years after a catastrophic impact event, it follows the antihero Tank Girl (Petty) as she, Jet Girl (Watts), and genetically modified supersoldiers called the Rippers fight Water & Power, an oppressive corporation led by Kesslee (McDowell).

After reading an issue of the Tank Girl comic she had received as a gift, Talalay obtained permission from the comic's publisher Deadline to direct a film adaptation. She selected Catherine Hardwicke to be the production designer, and worked closely with Martin and Hewlett during the making of the film. Tank Girl was filmed primarily in White Sands, New Mexico, and Tucson, Arizona. The film's critically praised soundtrack was assembled by Courtney Love, and the Rippers' makeup and prosthetics team was headed by Stan Winston. Winston's studio were so enthusiastic about the project they cut their usual prices in half to meet the film's budget.

Financially unsuccessful, Tank Girl recouped only about $6 million of its $25 million budget at the box office and received mixed reviews from critics. Martin and Hewlett have since spoken negatively of their experiences creating the film, and Talalay blamed some of the film's negative reception on studio edits over which she had no control. Despite the box-office failure of the film, it has since become a cult classic and has been noted for its feminist themes.

== Plot ==
In the year 2033, after a decade-long global drought in the wake of a comet striking the Earth, the little remaining water is controlled by Kesslee (Malcolm McDowell) and his Water & Power (W&P) corporation, which subdues the population by monopolizing the water supply. Rebecca "Tank Girl" Buck (Lori Petty) is a member of a commune in the Australian outback that operates the last water well not controlled by the corporation. In an attack on the commune, W&P troops kill Tank Girl's boyfriend, Richard (Brian Wimmer), and capture Tank Girl and her young friend Sam (Stacy Linn Ramsower). Rather than killing her, Kesslee enslaves and tortures the defiant Tank Girl. Jet Girl (Naomi Watts), a talented but introverted jet mechanic who has given up trying to escape W&P, urges Tank Girl to make less trouble for their captors, though Tank Girl refuses. Among other forms of torture, W&P personnel push her down into a long pipe to induce claustrophobia.

The mysterious Rippers slaughter guards at the W&P compound, then escape. Kesslee uses Tank Girl to lure the Rippers into the open, but they gravely wound him. Tank Girl and Jet Girl escape during the attack. Jet Girl steals a fighter jet from W&P, and Tank Girl steals a tank, which she modifies heavily. The girls learn from the eccentric Sub Girl (Ann Cusack) that Sam is working at a sex club called Liquid Silver. They infiltrate the club, rescue Sam from a pedophile, Rat Face (Iggy Pop), and then humiliate the club's owner, "The Madame" (Ann Magnuson), by making her sing Cole Porter's "Let's Do It" at gunpoint. W&P troops break up the performance and recapture Sam. Tank Girl and Jet Girl wander the desert and find the Rippers' hideout. They learn that the Rippers are supersoldiers created from human and kangaroo DNA by a man called Johnny Prophet. Tank Girl befriends a Ripper named Booga (Jeff Kober), while a Ripper named Donner (Scott Coffey) shows romantic interest in Jet Girl. Despite the objections of the Ripper T-Saint (Ice-T), who is suspicious of the girls, the Rippers' leader, Deetee (Reg E. Cathey), sends the pair out to capture a shipment of weapons. The girls bring the weapons crates back, though most are empty. After finding Johnny Prophet dead in one of the containers, the girls and the Rippers realize that W&P has tricked them.

The girls and the Rippers sneak into W&P, where they are ambushed. Kesslee, whose body had been reconstructed by the cybernetic surgeon Che'tsai (James Hong), reveals that Tank Girl has unknowingly been bugged. Deetee sacrifices himself, damaging the generator, and in the darkness, the Rippers turn the tide of the battle. Jet Girl kills Sergeant Small (Don Harvey), who had earlier sexually harassed her. Kesslee reveals that Sam is in the pipe, her life endangered by rising water. Tank Girl kills Kesslee, then pulls Sam out of the pipe. The film ends with an animated sequence showing water starting to flow freely. Tank Girl drives down rapids, pulling Booga behind on water skis, then takes them over a waterfall, shouting for joy.

== Themes ==
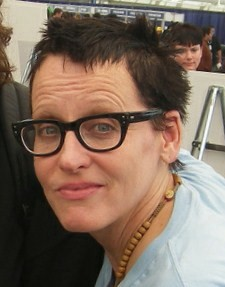
Lori Petty, who played the title role in Tank Girl, in 2008

Writing in the 1997 book Trash Aesthetics: Popular Culture and Its Audience, Deborah Cartmell states that while the comic showed Tank Girl to be "unheroic or even [an] accidental antihero", the film sets her up with "classic western generic" emotional and moral justifications for her liberation and revenge on W&P, as she witnesses the slaughter of her boyfriend and her "trusty steed". She also sees one of the commune's children being abducted and is herself captured and enslaved. Cartmell also says Tank Girl holds parallels with other "contemporary 'postfeminist' icons", as she displays dominant female sexuality and a "familiarity and knowing coolness of 'outlawed' modes of sexuality", such as masturbation, sadomasochism and lesbianism.

In her 2006 book The Modern Amazons: Warrior Women On-Screen, Dominique Mainon writes that the film has antiestablishment themes and, unlike many comic-book adaptation films which feature "gratuitous sexual objectification" of women, Tank Girl stands out as being "stridently feminist", with the exception of the "cliché victim/avenger complex". According to Mainon, the film makes fun of female stereotypes, as shown by Tank Girl's repeated emasculation of Kesslee with witty comebacks while she is being tortured, and by her response to the computer training device telling her how to present herself to men at the Liquid Silver club. The device provides seductive clothing and tells Tank Girl to remove her body hair and to wear make-up and a wig. Tank Girl completely ignores the advice and modifies the clothes to create her own style.

In the 2011 book Cult Cinema, Ernest Mathijs and Jamie Sexton discuss the issue of whether cult films purported to be feminist were truly feminist or "partly the effect of the performance of feminist attitudes in its reception". The authors consider Tank Girl to be a "'real' feminist cult film", as opposed to the feminist cult films of Kathryn Bigelow and Catherine Hardwicke, which they consider to be too masculine and too eager to cater to "hetero-normativity", respectively.

== Production ==
=== Preproduction ===
In 1988, about a year after the launch of the Tank Girl comic in the British magazine Deadline, its publisher, Tom Astor, began looking for a studio interested in making a film adaptation. While several studios, including New Line Cinema, expressed interest, progress was slow. Rachel Talalay's stepdaughter gave her a Tank Girl comic to read while she was shooting her directorial debut film, Freddy's Dead: The Final Nightmare (released in 1991). Talalay read the comic between takes and became interested in directing a Tank Girl film. She contacted Astor and, after hearing nothing for almost a year, was about to give up trying to secure the rights when he gave her permission to make the film. Talalay pitched the film to Amblin Entertainment and Columbia Pictures, which both turned it down. Talalay turned down an offer from Disney, as she did not believe the studio would allow the levels of violence and the sexual references the plot required. An offer from MGM was accepted. Talalay worked closely with the Tank Girl comic's co-creators Alan Martin and Jamie Hewlett during the film's production, and selected Catherine Hardwicke to be the production designer. The studio was unhappy with Hardwicke, who was relatively unknown at the time, being chosen over more experienced designers, and Talalay had to meet with the producers to persuade them to allow Hardwicke to work on the project. Tedi Sarafian wrote the screenplay and Gale Tattersall was chosen as cinematographer. Believing that MGM would not allow the depiction of a bestial relationship in the film, the romance between Tank Girl and Booga was only written into the second or third version of the script, after the character was already established in the minds of people involved in the production. By this stage, Booga: "was a character and not just a kangaroo [so] it wasn't an issue anymore."

=== Casting ===
MGM held open casting sessions in London, Los Angeles, and New York for the role of Tank Girl. According to Talalay, "two or three" of the Spice Girls met while waiting in line for the auditions; Victoria Beckham and Geri Halliwell can be seen standing next to each-other in footage from the event. There was skepticism towards the audition even at the time, and Talalay later confirmed it was a publicity stunt arranged by MGM; Talalay had already been asking the studio to cast a well-known English actress, Emily Lloyd. Talalay says she fired Lloyd after she refused to cut her hair for the role. Lloyd, who had spent four months training for the role, disputes this, saying production had been going well until Talalay found out she was staying at the same hotel as Sarafian. Lloyd says it was a coincidence and she barely spoke to Sarafian, and could only speculate as to why Talalay subsequently became "frosty with both of [them]" and then fired her, ostensibly for rescheduling her appointment with the film's hair stylist. Talalay cast Lori Petty, an American, because "she is crazy in her own life and [the film] needed somebody like that." MGM faxed Deadline asking them for an "ideal cast" list; they selected Malcolm McDowell for Kesslee, but never believed MGM would actually contact him. McDowell has spoken favorably of his experience working on the film, saying it had the "same flavour" as A Clockwork Orange, and praised Talalay and Petty. Talalay was approached by several people who wanted cameos in the film, but she did not want the film to be overshadowed by such appearances. Two cameos were settled on – Iggy Pop was given the role of Rat Face, and Björk was offered Sub Girl. She later dropped out, her character's scenes were rewritten, and the role was then given to Ann Cusack.

=== Filming ===
Tank Girl was filmed over 16 weeks, in three locations; desert scenes were filmed in White Sands, New Mexico, the Liquid Silver club set was built at an abandoned shopping mall in Phoenix, Arizona, and all remaining scenes were filmed within 40 miles of Tucson, Arizona. Many scenes were filmed in an abandoned open-pit mine, where filming had to be halted one day due to a chemical leak. Permission was received to film the water pipe scenes at the Titan Missile Museum, near the mine, but the day before shooting, permission was withdrawn. These scenes were filmed, instead, in a tunnel at the abandoned mine. New sets were often found by simply searching the mine. Principal photography was completed on September 27, 1994, two days over schedule, though still within the original budget.

=== Effects ===
The tank as seen in the film built upon a M5A1 Stuart chassis, which featured accessories ranging from lawn chairs to rocket launchers. The rear section of a 1969 Cadillac Eldorado is visible at the back of the tank.

In the comics, the Rippers are considerably more kangaroo-like. However, Talalay wanted real actors rather than stuntmen in suits playing the roles. She asked Hewlett to redesign the Rippers to make them more human, allowing them to have the actual actors' facial expressions. Requests were sent out to "all the major make-up and effects people", including Stan Winston, whose prior work included the Terminator films, Aliens and Jurassic Park. Talalay said that while she considered Winston to be the best, she did not expect to hear back from him. When she did, she still did not think that she would be able to afford his studio on her budget. A meeting was arranged and Winston insisted on being given the project, saying the Rippers would be: "the best characters we've had the opportunity to do." Winston's studio cut their usual prices in half to meet the film's budget. Eight Rippers were featured in the film: half were given principal roles, the others were mainly in the background. Each Ripper had articulated ears and tails which were activated by remote control, and the background Rippers also had mechanical snouts which could be activated either by remote control or by the movement of the actors' mouths. Each Ripper's make-up took about four hours to apply. Three technicians from Winston's studio were required to work on each Ripper's articulations during filming; no puppets or digital effects were used for the Rippers.

The main tank used in the film is a modified M5A1 Stuart. It was purchased from the government of Peru about 12 years prior to filming and had already been used in several films. Among numerous modifications made for Tank Girl, the tank's 37 mm antitank gun was covered with a modified flag pole to give the appearance of a 105 mm gun. An entire 1969 Cadillac Eldorado was added onto the tank, with the rear section welded at the back and the fender welded to the front.

=== Post-production ===
A "naked Ripper suit" incorporating a prosthetic penis was created for Booga and used in a filmed postcoital scene which was removed from the final version of the film at the studio's insistence. Deborah Cartmell described the "postcoital scene" in the final version, which featured Booga fully clothed, as "carefully edited". Against Talalay's wishes, the studio made several other edits to the film. The scene in which Kesslee tortures Tank Girl was cut heavily on the grounds that she appeared "too ugly" while being tortured. Also cut was a scene showing Tank Girl's bedroom, which was shown to be decorated with dozens of dildos, and a scene in which she places a condom on a banana before throwing it at a soldier. The role of Sub Girl was originally intended to be larger; at least two scenes featuring the character were cut from the film, including her appearance in the original ending. The studio cut the original ending, a live-action scene in which it begins to rain; the film was to have ended with Tank Girl burping.

== Soundtrack ==
Tank Girl – Original Soundtrack

Soundtrack album by Various artists
- Released: March 28, 1995
- Recorded: 1994
- Genre: Alternative rock
- Length: 41:58
- Labels: Warner Bros. Records; Elektra Records
- Producer: Various artists

The film's soundtrack was assembled by Courtney Love; Graeme Revell composed the original music. Love's band Hole contributed the song "Drown Soda". Greg Graffin from Bad Religion was originally supposed to sing the duet of "Let's Do It, Let's Fall in Love" with Joan Jett, but due to contractual restrictions he was replaced by Paul Westerberg from the Replacements. Devo recorded a new version of their song "Girl U Want" specifically for the film, as they were big fans of the comic. "Girl U Want" plays in the film's opening sequence, featuring the singing of Jula Bell from Bulimia Banquet; this version with Bell is in the film but not on the soundtrack album. The soundtrack featured Björk's song "Army of Me" before it was released as a single. Because of the box-office failure of the film, both Björk and her label decided not to use footage from the film in the song's accompanying music video.

The song "Mockingbird Girl" by the Magnificent Bastards (a side project of Scott Weiland) was recorded specifically for the album after Love approached Weiland asking if he would like to contribute a song. The single's cover showed the torso and thighs of an animated character resembling Tank Girl and featured the tracks "Ripper Sole" and "Girl U Want" from the album. In the United States, it peaked at No. 27 on the Mainstream Rock chart and No. 12 on the Modern Rock Tracks chart. The song "2¢" by Beowülf also appears in the film; Talalay lobbied Restless Records to have the song included on the soundtrack but was unsuccessful. Instead, she directed the music video for the song, which featured both animated and live-action footage from the film.

The soundtrack album was released on March 28, 1995, by Warner Bros. Records and Elektra Records. It peaked at number 72 on the Billboard 200. The next week, New York magazine wrote that the soundtrack was getting more attention than the film itself. However, Ron Hancock of Tower Records stated that sales of the album were disappointing and attributed this to the financial failure of the film. Owen Gleiberman spoke favorably of the soundtrack, as did Laura Barcella writing in the book The End, describing it as a "who's who of '90s female rock." Stephen Thomas Erlewine of Allmusic said the album was "much better than the film", awarding it three out of five stars.

Professional ratings
Review scores
Source	Rating
AllMusic	3/5 stars
NME	4/10

No.	Title	Recording artist(s)	Length
1.	"Ripper Sole"	Stomp!	1:42
2.	"Army of Me"	Björk	3:56
3.	"Girl U Want"	Devo	3:51
4.	"Mockingbird Girl"	The Magnificent Bastards	3:30
5.	"Shove"	L7	3:11
6.	"Drown Soda"	Hole	3:50
7.	"Bomb"	Bush	3:23
8.	"Roads"	Portishead	5:04
9.	"Let's Do It, Let's Fall in Love"	Joan Jett and Paul Westerberg	2:23
10.	"Thief"	Belly	3:12
11.	"Aurora"	Veruca Salt	4:03
12.	"Big Gun"	Ice-T	3:54
Total length:			41:58

=== Other songs in the film ===
- "B-A-B-Y" by Rachel Sweet
- "Big Time Sensuality" by Björk
- "Blank Generation" by Richard Hell and the Voidoids
- "Disconnected" by Face to Face
- "Shipwrecked" by Sky Cries Mary
- "Theme from Shaft" by Isaac Hayes
- "2¢" by Beowülf
- "Wild, Wild, Thing" by Iggy Pop

== Release ==
=== Initial screening and box office ===
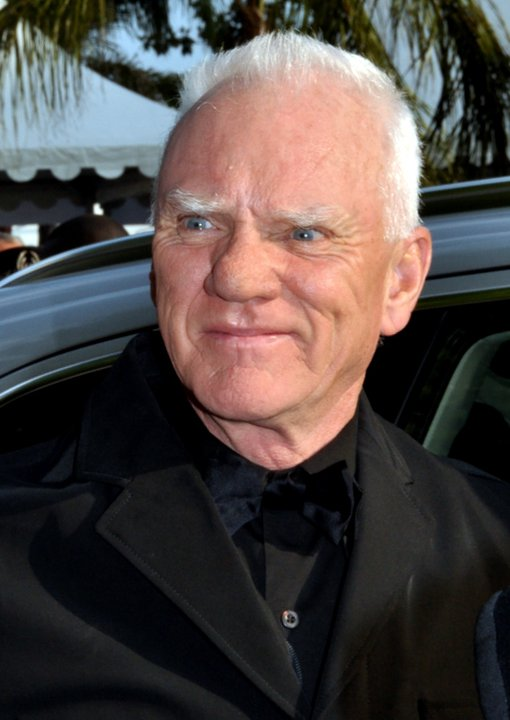
Malcolm McDowell, who portrayed the film's main villain Kesslee, in 2011

Tank Girl premiered at the Mann Chinese Theatre on March 30, 1995. Approximately 1,500 people attended the screening, including Talalay, Petty, Ice-T, McDowell, Watts, and several other actors from the film, as well as Rebecca De Mornay, Lauren Tom, Brendan Fraser and Jason Simmons. Men in W&P costumes handed out bottles of mineral water, and girls dressed in Liquid Silver outfits gave out Astro Pops, candy cigarettes, and Tank Girl candy necklaces. About 400 people attended the official after-party at the Hollywood Roosevelt Hotel. The film opened in cinemas across the United States the following day.

Tank Girl opened in 1,341 theatres in the United States bringing in $2,018,183 in its first weekend and $2,684,430 at the end of its first week of release. By the end of its second week, Tank Girl had made only $3,668,762. Its final gross in the United States was $4,064,495. Internationally, the film added approximately $2,000,000 to that total, against a production budget of $25 million.

=== Critical reception ===
The film holds an approval ratings of 45% on Rotten Tomatoes, based on 47 reviews. The website's critical consensus reads: "While unconventional, Tank Girl isn't particularly clever or engaging, and none of the script's copious one-liners have any real zing." On Metacritic the film has a weighted average score of 46 out of 100, based on reviews from 23 critics, indicating "mixed or average reviews". Audiences surveyed by CinemaScore gave the film a grade B on scale of A to F.

Lamar Hafildason of the BBC gave the film one out of five stars, saying: "Sadly, the BBC does not pay out for one-word reviews. If it did, then this review would read simply: 'tiresome'." In 2001, Matt Brunson from Creative Loafing gave the film one and a half stars out of four, saying its soundtrack and the glimpse of Naomi Watts' early career were its only redeeming qualities. Jonathan Rosenbaum gave a moderately positive reviews, concluding: "unless you're a preteen boy who hates girls, it's funnier and a lot more fun than Batman Forever."

Roger Ebert gave the film two out of four stars. While praising the film's ambition, he concluded it was hard to care about it for long as its "manic energy" wore him down. Janet Maslin made similar comments about the impact of the film's over-the-top style. Her mixed review also criticised the film's "pointless" plot, though praised the performances of both McDowell and Petty. Owen Gleiberman said Petty's performance was the only good part of the otherwise "amateurish" film, giving it an overall C− rating. Leonard Klady from Variety was more critical of Petty, saying she "has the spunk but, sadly, not the heart of the post-apocalyptic heroine", also stating the film lacked an engaging story to draw its intriguing elements together.

Retrospective reviews of Tank Girl have tended to be more positive. In 2015, Elizabeth Sankey said that while plot and continuity issues left the film "tremendously flawed", she still could not help loving it, praising its soundtrack and costuming. Petty's performance was particularly revered, as was the character of Tank Girl. In 2020, Megan Carpentier from NBC News gave a positive review, saying it was too ahead of its time and attributing its initial poor reception to its feminist themes both unsettling the all male producers and executives enough to make heavy cuts to the film, and also not appealing to the mostly male film critics at the time. That same year, Jef Rouner from the San Francisco Chronicle called Tank Girl the most underappreciated comic book film, praising its style and the performance and chemistry between Petty and McDowell, and Cheryl Eddy from Gizmodo described it as a "fun-as-hell" film that had "long since made up for its tepid box-office take by becoming a cult sensation."

=== Home media ===
Tank Girl was released on DVD in the United States by MGM on April 10, 2001. Aaron Beierle from DVD Talk gave the DVD three and a half stars out of five for both video and audio quality, though only half a star for special features, noting that only the original trailer was included.

Shout! Factory acquired the rights to several MGM films, including Tank Girl, and subsequently released a US Blu-ray version on November 19, 2013. Special features included the original trailer, a 'Making of' featurette, a commentary track with Petty and Talalay, and interviews with Talalay, Petty, and Hardwicke. Jeffrey Kauffman from Blu-ray.com gave the version four stars out of five for audio and video quality and three stars for special features. M. Enois Duarte from highdefdigest.com gave the version three and a half stars out of five for video quality, four stars for audio quality, and two and a half stars for extras. This edition was released in Japan by TC Entertainment in 2016, and by Koch Media in Germany in 2020. In Australia, Umbrella Entertainment released a Blu-ray of the film in 2024 with existing features as well as a new video essay and interview with Ripper actor Doug Jones.

In January 2026, Vinegar Syndrome released a 4K Ultra HD and Blu-ray edition of the film as part of their "Vinegar Syndrome Ultra" line. This release features a new 4K restoration from the original camera negative, a 40-page book, a new commentary track by critic Kristen Lopez, and new interviews with Petty, Talalay, and Hardwicke.

== Legacy and related media ==
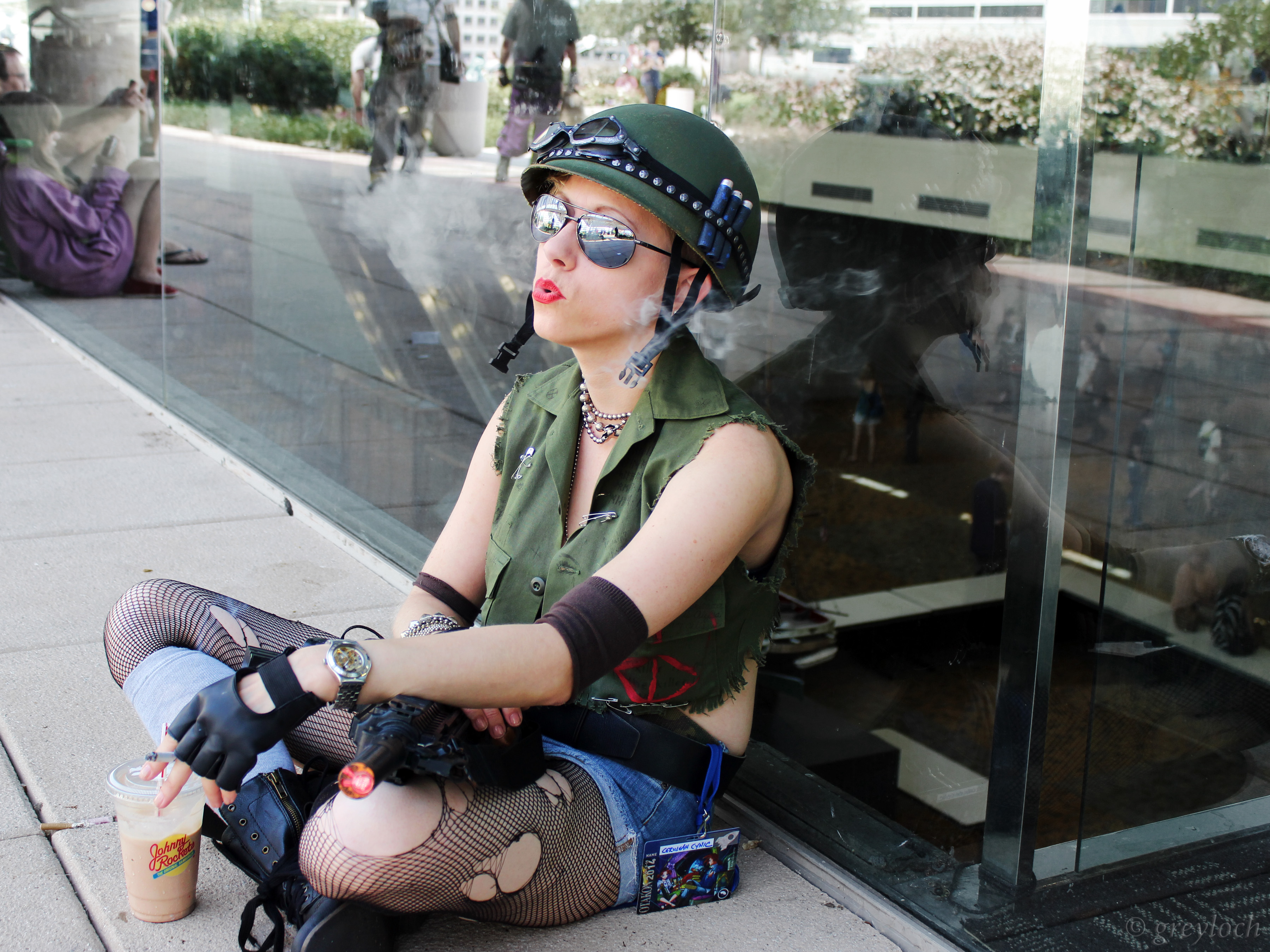
A Tank Girl cosplayer in 2014

To boost its declining readership, Deadline featured Tank Girl on its cover many times in 1994 and 1995 in anticipation of the film's release. Subsequently, Tom Astor said the release of the film: "was very helpful, but it did not make up the difference, it lost some of its cult appeal without gaining any mainstream credibility." The magazine ceased publication in late 1995. Alan Martin and Jamie Hewlett have since spoken negatively of their experiences creating the film, calling it "a bit of a sore point" for them. "The script was lousy," Hewlett recalled, "me and Alan kept rewriting it and putting Grange Hill jokes and Benny Hill jokes in, and they obviously weren't getting it. They forgot to film about ten major scenes so we had to animate them ... it was a horrible experience." Talalay complained that the studio interfered significantly in the story, screenplay, and feel of the film. She said that she had been "in sync" and on good terms with Martin and Hewlett until the studio made significant cuts to the film, which she had no control over.

Peter Milligan wrote an adaptation comic in 1995, and a novelization of the film by Martin Millar was published in 1996. In July 1995, it was reported that Ocean Software had acquired the licence to create console video-game adaptations of the film, though no game was ever released. In 2008, Talalay was negotiating with Sony to obtain the rights to direct a Tank Girl reboot film. Obtaining the rights was said to be a difficult process, due to legal issues of propriety related to the acquisition of MGM and United Artists by Sony and other companies.

Despite being a critical and commercial failure, Tank Girl is often said to have a cult following. Petty's version of Tank Girl remains a popular character at cosplay events. The music video for Avril Lavigne's 2013 song "Rock n Roll" paid homage to Tank Girl. Megan Carpentier credits Tank Girl as having a strong influence on the aesthetics of the 2020 film Birds of Prey, and also speculated about its influence on the films The Matrix Reloaded, Mad Max: Fury Road and the character of Hit-Girl in Kick-Ass. During her interview included on the Blu-ray release of the film in 2013, Petty was asked why she thinks the film still resonates with fans, and replied: "There's no formula as to why Tank Girl was so fabulous and why people love it so much ... It was unique, it was new, it was fresh, it was way ahead of its time, and I'm happy that I got to do it and that I'll always have her." Luke Buckmaster from the BBC included the film in his 2015 list of the "ten weirdest superhero films", asserting that: "at its best, director Rachel Talalay captures an ostentatious steampunk vibe that proves weirdly addictive."

It was reported in September 2019 that a reboot of the film was in early development with Margot Robbie's production company LuckyChap Entertainment, who optioned the rights from MGM. Production was put on hold due to the COVID-19 pandemic.

== Bibliography ==
- Barcella, Laura (July 24, 2012). The End: 50 Apocalyptic Visions From Pop Culture That You Should Know About ... Before It's Too Late. Zest Books. ISBN 978-0-9827322-5-0.
- Cartmell, Deborah (December 1, 1997). Trash Aesthetics: Popular Culture and Its Audience. Pluto Press. ISBN 978-0-7453-1202-6.
- Lloyd, Emily (2014). Wish I Was There. John Blake Publishing. ISBN 978-1782199588.
- Mainon, Dominique (March 1, 2006). The Modern Amazons: Warrior Women On-Screen. Limelight Editions. ISBN 978-0-87910-327-9.
- Mathijs, Ernest; Mendik, Xavier (December 1, 2007). The Cult Film Reader. Open University Press. ISBN 978-0-335-21923-0. Archived from the original on October 15, 2015.
- Mathijs, Ernest; Sexton, Jamie (April 22, 2011). Cult Cinema. Wiley-Blackwell. ISBN 978-1-4051-7373-5. Archived from the original on October 15, 2015.
- Shirley, Ian (August 22, 2005). Can Rock & Roll Save The World?: An Illustrated History of Music And Comics. SAF publishing. ISBN 978-0-946719-80-8.
- Wynne, Frank (May 4, 1995). The Making of Tank Girl. Titan Books. ISBN 978-1-85286-621-1.
- Milligan, Peter (1995). Tank Girl: Explosive Adaptation of the Hit Film!. DC Comics. ISBN 978-1-56389-219-6.
- Millar, Martin (1996). Tank Girl: Novelisation. Penguin Group. ISBN 978-0-14-024876-0.
