= Something Wild (1961 film) =

1961 film by Jack Garfein

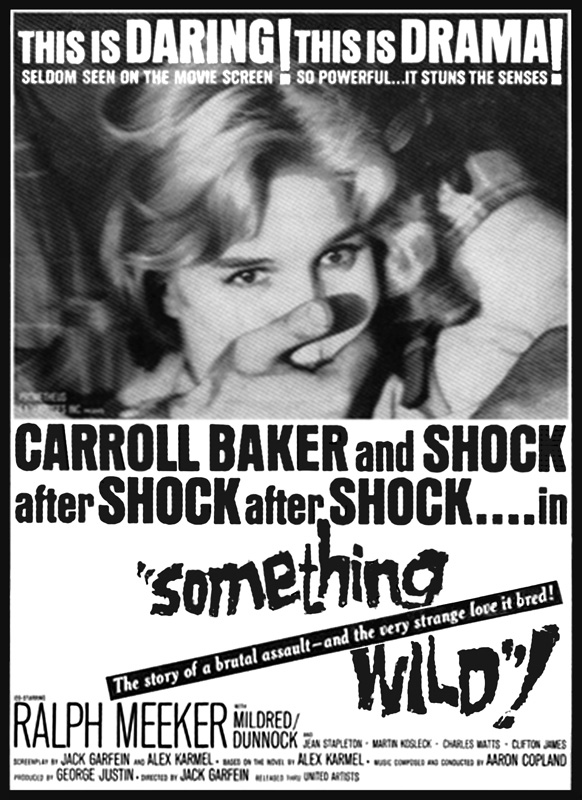
- Promotional poster
- Directed by: Jack Garfein
- Written by: Jack Garfein; Alex Karmel
- Based on: Mary Ann by Alex Karmel
- Produced by: George Justin
- Starring: Carroll Baker; Ralph Meeker; Mildred Dunnock; Jean Stapleton; Martin Kosleck; Charles Watts; Clifton James
- Cinematography: Eugen Schüfftan
- Edited by: Carl Lerner
- Music by: Aaron Copland
- Production company: Prometheus Enterprises
- Distributed by: United Artists
- Release date: December 20, 1961
- Running time: 113 minutes
- Country: United States
- Language: English
- Budget: $1 million

Something Wild is a 1961 American neo-noir psychological drama film directed by Jack Garfein and starring Carroll Baker, Ralph Meeker, Mildred Dunnock, Jean Stapleton, and Martin Kosleck. It follows a young New York City college student who, after being brutally raped in a Bronx park, is held captive by a mechanic who saves her from committing suicide on the Manhattan Bridge. The film is based on the 1958 novel Mary Ann by Alex Karmel, who cowrote the screenplay with Garfein.

An early American independent film, Something Wild was produced by Prometheus Enterprises, a production company formed by then-husband and wife Garfein and Baker, and funded by its distributor, United Artists, on a budget of $1 million. Principal photography took place in New York City in the summer of 1960, largely on location, with some interior studio filming.

Something Wild premiered in New York City at the Plaza Theatre on December 20, 1961. The film received favorable reviews from film critics but was a box-office disappointment for United Artists. In the decades following its release, the film established a reputation as a neglected example of American independent and art cinema. The film was re-mastered and released on Blu-ray and DVD in 2017 by The Criterion Collection.

== Plot ==
Mary Ann Robinson, a teenage student in New York City, is brutally raped while walking in a park near her home in the Bronx. Traumatized by the experience, she washes away all of the evidence and destroys her clothing. She hides the rape from her mother and stepfather, with whom she has a distant relationship. Mary Ann unsuccessfully tries to continue living her normal life. She takes the subway to school and faints during the crush of people. The police escort her home, which upsets her prim and unsympathetic mother.

The rape continues to haunt Mary Ann. She leaves school abruptly and walks downtown through Harlem and Times Square to the Lower East Side. She rents a room there from a sinister-looking landlord of a seedy building. She takes a job at a five and ten store, where her coworkers dislike her because she is distant and unfriendly. Overwhelmed at her job after her coworkers play a prank on her, Mary Ann walks across the Manhattan Bridge and almost jumps to her death into the East River, but she is stopped by Mike, a mechanic. At first, he seems to have her best interests in mind, offering her shelter and food. She decides to stay with him, but when he comes home drunk and tries to attack her, Mary Ann kicks him in the eye. The following morning, he has no recollection of the incident, but his eye is badly hurt and is eventually surgically removed.

Mike forces Mary Ann to stay at his apartment, saying "I like the way you look here." She wants to leave, but he refuses to let her go, keeping the door locked. He holds her captive in the apartment, but she refuses to have anything to do with him.

One night, Mike proposes marriage to Mary Ann and she rejects him. He again attempts to be physical with her. Mary Ann reveals that it was she who blinded him in the eye. When Mary Ann discovers the door unlocked, she leaves, walking through the city and sleeping in Central Park. She later returns to Mike's apartment, and when he asks why she has returned, she says "I came for you." She writes her mother, who comes to the apartment and is shocked to see where and with whom Mary Ann lives. She has married Mike and announces that she is pregnant. Her mother insists that she come home, and Mary Ann replies that she now considers the apartment her home.

== Cast ==
- Carroll Baker as Mary Ann Robinson
- Ralph Meeker as Mike
- Mildred Dunnock as Mrs. Gates
- Jean Stapleton as Shirley Johnson
- Doris Roberts as Mary Ann's co-worker
- Martin Kosleck as Landlord
- Clifton James as Detective Bogart
- George L. Smith as Store Manager

Diane Ladd appears in an uncredited bit part, marking her first film appearance. William Hickey and Logan Ramsey also appear in uncredited bit parts.

== Themes ==
Writers Dominique Mainon and James Ursini note transformation through love as a prominent theme in Something Wild, citing the film's key sequence in which Mary Ann kicks a drunken Mike in defense, eventually causing him to have his eye removed. They interpret Mike's acceptance of her after the incident as a marker of this: "She trusts him because on a psychological and symbolic level he has taken the blow that she would have rather delivered to [her] rapist. By accepting her punishment and yet still loving her, he has purged her fear, or at least her fear of him, and earned her trust. Thereby, the film becomes not just a tale of rape and recovery but also a parable of the healing power of love."

== Production ==
=== Development ===
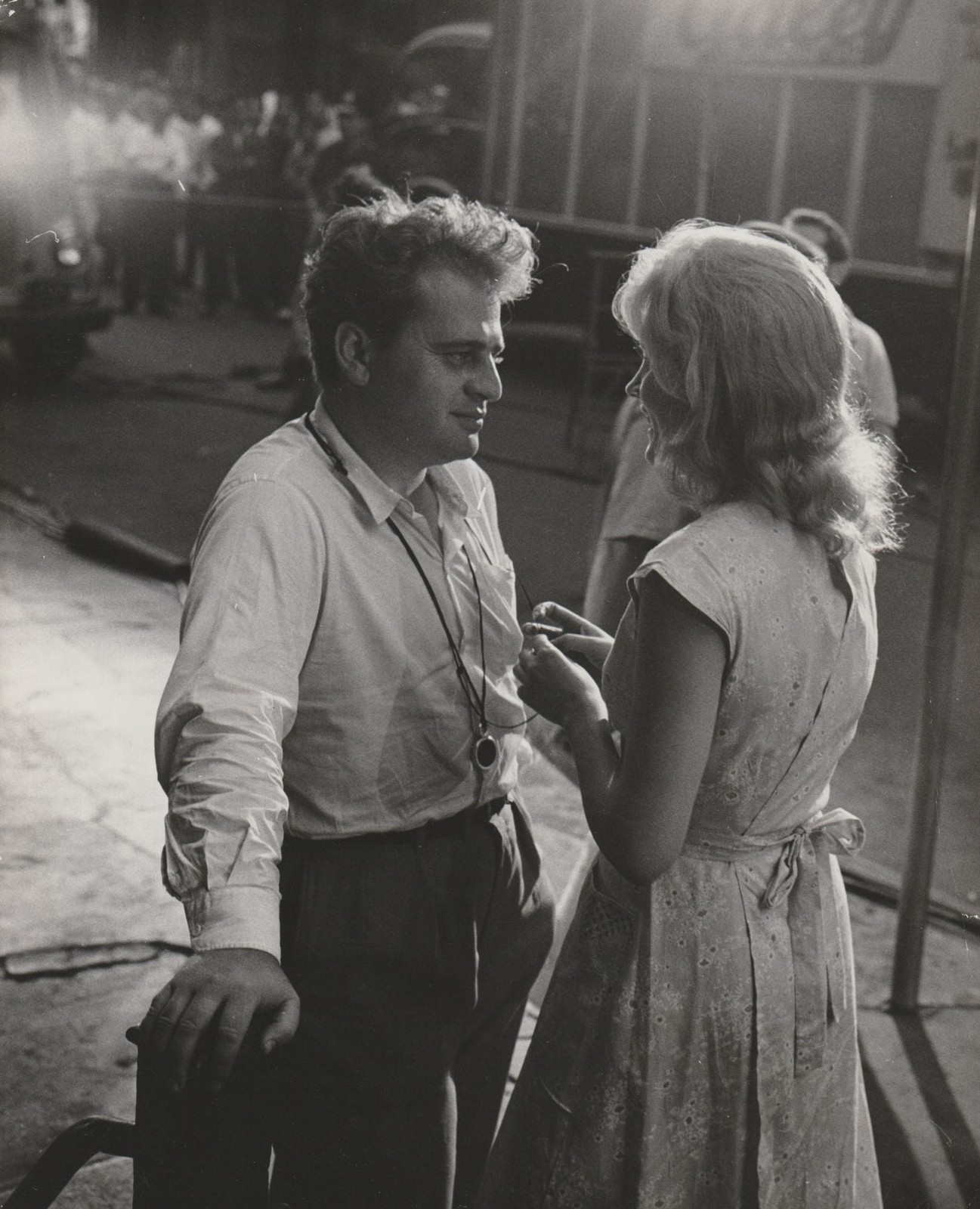
Jack Garfein and Carroll Baker on the set of Something Wild

Prometheus Productions, formed by director Jack Garfein and his wife Carroll Baker, obtained film rights to Mary Ann, the first novel written by Alex Karmel, published in 1958. Karmel and Garfein wrote the script, and pitched the project to multiple studios who declined to produce it, deeming the subject matter too controversial and demanding alterations to the screenplay that Garfein was unwilling to make. Eventually, Max E. Youngstein of United Artists agreed to finance the film on a budget of $1 million. The film had the working title Something Wild in the City.

=== Casting ===
Garfein wrote and developed the film with his then-wife, Carroll Baker, intended to portray the role of Mary Ann. Ralph Meeker was cast as Mike, the mechanic who eventually takes her in. Rehearsals began in the early summer of 1960.

=== Filming ===
Principal photography of Something Wild began on July 20, 1960, and was completed by mid-October 1960. The film was shot exclusively in New York City, with location shooting occurring at the Manhattan Bridge, a real Woolworth's department store in Harlem, the City College of New York main campus, and several locales on the Lower East Side. Some interiors were filmed in Manhattan at the studios of Himan Brown.

In photographing the landscape of the city with cinematographer Eugen Schüfftan, Garfein sought to portray the city in a poetic manner as opposed to a "documentary" approach, intent ending to position the protagonist of Mary Ann as an isolated figure navigating the "horror and beauty" of urban life. Commenting on the location shooting, Garfein recalled:

The Screen Actors Guild closed me down for a day because I went down the street on which we were shooting on the Lower East Side and talked actual people on the block into portraying themselves. The excitement of making a film lies in using people in their neighborhoods, and capturing the actuality of drama going on without people being aware of it. The people were much better than extras. They didn’t give a damn and paid absolutely no attention to the camera. I went down and found that grimy rooming house, rented a room for six dollars a week, and the landlord did not even care who I was or who Carroll was, or why she wanted to live up there. The indifference of the big city dweller is a very rare thing... But by shooting on actual locations in the city, the visual essence of what might happen to Mary Ann on those streets, when walking through those neighborhoods, adds to the tension of the film.

Meeker's filming schedule for his scenes was approximately three weeks. Baker's sister, Virginia, makes a minor appearance in the film as a shopgirl.

=== Post-production ===
The opening title sequence was designed by Saul Bass and features many images of New York City, where the film was shot.

== Music ==
Morton Feldman was originally commissioned to compose the film's score, but when Garfein heard the music, he reportedly said "My wife is being raped and you write celesta music?" and replaced Feldman with Aaron Copland. In 1964, Copland reused some of the film's themes in his symphonic work Music for a Great City. The original film score, taken from private session recordings preserved by Garfein, was finally released on CD in 2003.

== Release ==
Something Wild premiered at the Plaza Theatre in New York City on December 20, 1961. The film had its premiere in San Francisco on March 7, 1962.

It was released in London later that year, on September 7, 1962, where it received an X certificate.

=== Home media ===
The film was released for the first time on DVD as part of the MGM Limited Edition Collection in December 2011. The Criterion Collection released the film on Blu-ray and DVD on January 17, 2017.

== Reception ==
=== Box office ===
The film was not a financial success, described by Dorothy Kilgallen as a "box office disappointment" and "a financial blow to the star and her husband." According to Baker in a 2017 interview, United Artists did little to promote the film, hoping it would become a sleeper hit by word-of-mouth.

=== Critical response ===
In a contemporary review for The New York Times, critic Bosley Crowther wrote:

[T]he real jolt the audience is asked to endure is the weird way she acts when she is fetched home by a lonesome fellow who has saved her from jumping off a bridge. Locked in his basement apartment, she snarls but she doesn't scream, she resists his clumsy attempts to be kind to her but she doesn't break a window and howl. ... [I]t is quite unnerving and confusing to go through the terrible, tedious torture that Mr. Garfein and Mr. Karmel have devised. It is quite exhausting to sit through that ordeal in the apartment, when she and the man, played grossly, yet gently, by Ralph Meeker, open and abrade each other's wounds. And what is more, it is not too satisfying, because it isn't quite credible and the symbolic meaning (if there is one) is beyond our ability to grasp.

Jonas Mekas wrote in Film Quarterly that the film was the "most interesting American film of the quarter; it may become the most underestimated film of the year."

Wanda Hale of the New York Daily News praised Baker as a "fine actress" and Garfein's direction "very tight and smooth," summarizing: "Something Wild carries a moral for the feminine sex: Don't walk in the city's parks alone after dark." The San Francisco Examiner's Stanley Eichelbaum praised Baker's performance as "extraordinary," also commenting that the screenplay "reminded [him] of Paddy Chayefsky's Bronx dialogue transplanted to a sickening Kafka horror tale."

Philip K. Scheuer of the Los Angeles Times wrote favorably of the performances and atmosphere, but felt that the film's pacing becomes sluggish in the latter half, "slump[ing] into slower motion than the Italian Antonioni."

=== Modern assessment ===
In Cinema of Obsession: Erotic Fixation and Love Gone Wrong in the Movies, writers Dominique Mainon and James Ursini characterize Something Wild as an "early representative of the American independent film movement" that "anticipates several other, more famous films of obsession and possession, including Hitchcock's Marnie and William Wyler's The Collector."

Critic Glenn Erickson described the film a 2017 retrospective as one of the best American art films ever made.

Chuck Bowen of Slant Magazine characterized Something Wild as "a neglected melodrama that deserves immediate admission into the canon of great American films."

== See also ==
- List of American films of 1961

== Sources ==
- Cordes, Vojislava Filipcevic (2020). New York in Cinematic Imagination: The Agitated City. New York City, New York: Routledge. ISBN 978-1-000-09049-9.
- Feldman, Morton (2006). Morton Feldman Says: Selected Interviews and Lectures 1964-1987. London, England: Hyphen Press. ISBN 978-0-907-25931-2.
- Mainon, Dominique; Ursini, James, eds. (2007). Cinema of Obsession: Erotic Fixation and Love Gone Wrong in the Movies. New York City, New York: Limelight Editions. ISBN 978-0-879-10347-7.
