= The Modern Amazons =

2006 book by Dominique Mainon and James Ursini

The Modern Amazons: Warrior Women On-Screen
- Paperback edition of The Modern Amazons.
- Author: Dominique Mainon and James Ursini
- Language: English
- Subject: Film history, warrior women, cinema, pop culture
- Genre: Gender studies
- Publisher: Hal Leonard Press/Limelight Editions
- Publication date: April 2006 (USA)
- Publication place: United States
- Media type: Print
- Pages: 400
- ISBN: 0-87910-327-2
- OCLC: 63703060
- Followed by: Cinema of Obsession: Erotic Fixation and Love Gone Wrong in the Movies

The Modern Amazons: Warrior Women On-Screen (ISBN 0-87910-327-2) is a non-fiction book documenting the evolution of the female action hero in cinema, television and pop-culture.

The Modern Amazons was written by Dominique Mainon and James Ursini and published by Hal Leonard/Limelight Editions in 2006.

== Synopsis ==
From Barbarella to Barb Wire, the book surveys public reception and interest in the "warrior-woman" and the Amazon archetype in media. The Modern Amazons is written from Mainon's perspective and balanced with academic analysis from James Ursini.

The book explores representations of warrior women in film, television, and pop culture including:

- Raquel Welch in the prehistoric adventure fantasy One Million Years B.C. (1966)
- Pam Grier in the blaxploitation genre (including films like Coffy, Foxy Brown, and Sheba, Baby)
- Lucy Lawless as Xena in Xena: Warrior Princess
- Lara Croft, as portrayed by Angelina Jolie, in the Tomb Raider series
- Ellen Ripley, as portrayed by Sigourney Weaver, in the Alien franchise
- Martial arts warriors,, as portrayed by Angela Mao (Enter the Dragon), Zhang Ziyi (Crouching Tiger, Hidden Dragon), and Cynthia Rothrock
- Sexploitation films, including the controversial Ilsa trilogy
- Women as vampire slayers, superheroes, and supervillains
- Assorted television, cartoon, comics, and video game characters
- Relevant trends, style, and trivia

Ursini and Mainon also examine feminist readings and sapphic text and subtext in media such as: the Powerpuff Girls, Tank Girl, G.I. Jane, La Femme Nikita, Alien, Pippi Longstocking, Pepper from Police Woman, and Clarice in The Silence of the Lambs.

== Reception ==
According to reviewers, The Modern Amazons has "an authoritative style... free of pretension and stuffiness."

== See also ==
- Cinema of Obsession: Erotic Fixation and Love Gone Wrong in the Movies
