= Cinema of Obsession =

Book by Dominique Mainon and James Ursini

Cinema of Obsession: Erotic Fixation and Love Gone Wrong in the Movies
- Author: Dominique Mainon and James Ursini
- Language: English
- Subject: Film History, Erotic Film, Amour Fou
- Genre: Film History
- Publisher: Hal Leonard Press/Limelight Editions
- Publication date: September 30, 2007 (USA)
- Publication place: United States
- Media type: Print
- Pages: 408
- ISBN: 0-87910-347-7
- OCLC: 168724243
- Dewey Decimal: 791.43/6538 22
- LC Class: PN1995.9.L6 M35 2007

Cinema of Obsession: Erotic Fixation and Love Gone Wrong in the Movies, written by Dominique Mainon and James Ursini, is a non-fiction book on the history of obsessive love and erotic fixation in cinema. It was published by Hal Leonard Press/Limelight Editions in September 2007.

== Synopsis ==
Cinema of Obsession begins with an overview of amour fou ("mad love") in literature and myth, then explores the theme in modern cinema. From its origins in the myths of Ovid (such as Pygmalion or Galatea, Psyche and Cupid, and the Narcissus myth), to medieval tales of tragic love triangles (like King Arthur, Queen Guinevere and Sir Lancelot and Mark, Tristan, and Isolde), on to the Romantic tales of the Brontes, and as explored in twentieth-century works of writers of erotica like D.H. Lawrence and Anaïs Nin.

The book features seminal works on obsession such as Buñuel's Un Chien Andalou, Dietrich's The Blue Angel, Peter Ibbetson, The Phantom of the Opera, Renoir's La Bête Humaine, and Of Human Bondage. It also explores the explosive nature of obsessive love in films including Romeo and Juliet, Duel in the Sun, Wuthering Heights, Carmen, Last Tango in Paris, Betty Blue, Sid and Nancy, Eternal Sunshine of the Spotless Mind, and the films of Wong Kar-wai and Pedro Almodóvar.

Cinema of Obsession addresses issues of men obsessed with controlling the subject of their obsession, as in films like Eyes Without a Face; Vertigo, Marnie, Basic Instinct, Death in Venice, and The Temptation of Doctor Anthony. Male masochism is a key element of many of these films, especially in film noirs like Criss Cross, The Killers, Gilda, The Postman Always Rings Twice, and more modern explorations like Lolita and Cronenberg's M. Butterfly.

The book explores the tropes of the fugitive couple or "love on the run," centering on films like Gun Crazy;, Truffaut's Mississippi Mermaid and the remake Original Sin; Moulin Rouge!; and David Lynch's Wild at Heart.

In the final chapter, Cinema of Obsession concentrates on the female gaze and examples of female obsession in film (e.g. Jane Eyre, Lady Chatterley's Lover, The Story of Adele H., Fatal Attraction, The Lover, The Piano, and Vanilla Sky).

== See also ==
- The Modern Amazons: Warrior Women On-Screen (2006)
