= Glyn Dillon =

British artist and costume designer

- Born: 1971 (age 54–55)
- Areas: artist, writer
- Notable works: The Nao of Brown
- Awards: Special Jury Prize, Angoulême International Comics Festival, 2013 Best Book, British Comic Awards, 2013 Concept Art Awards, 2022

Glyn Dillon (born 1971) is a British Costume Designer, as well as a comics and film storyboard and Concept Artist, best known for his work on Project Hail Mary, the Star Wars films The Force Awakens, Rogue One, and Solo, designing the Batsuit for Matt Reeves' 2022 The Batman as well as his 2012 graphic novel The Nao of Brown.

== Early life ==
Glyn is the youngest of 3 siblings. Glyn Dillon's father was a signwriter; his older brother Steve Dillon was also a comics artist. Julie Dillon Bleaden, the middle sibling works in childcare.

== Career ==
Dillon got his first job in comics at the age of 17, a 2000AD "Future Shock" story. He went on to draw "Judge Dredd" and then "Planet Swerve", a strip about "art students in space" written by Alan Martin, for Deadline magazine. He also worked for DC Comics' Vertigo imprint, including the miniseries "Egypt" with writer Peter Milligan and "Shade, the Changing Man" with the same writer.

In the mid 1990s he left comics to work in film and television, primarily as a Storyboard and Concept Artist, as well as a period directing music promos for Ridley Scott's RSA Films. In 1995, he toured with the band Pulp as their 'Swag Man'. He shared a studio in London with Jamie Hewlett, contributing to Hewlett's Gorillaz website and tour visuals. In 2008 he began work on his graphic novel, "The Nao of Brown". The story of a young woman with Primarily Obsessional OCD, it was published by SelfMadeHero in 2012 and won the Special Jury Prize at the Angoulême International Comics Festival in 2013. In 2013 he started working as a concept artist in the Costume Dept on "Jupiter Ascending", he then went on to work, in the same capacity, on "Kingsman: The Secret Service". He then became Chief Concept Artist in the Costume Dept on "Star Wars: The Force Awakens", for which he designed antagonist Kylo Ren's mask, before being promoted to Costume Designer, alongside David Crossman, together they designed Star Wars films "Rogue One" and "Solo: A Star Wars Story". They also designed the Robert Pattinson Batsuit, and the Ryan Gosling led "Project Hail Mary".

== Bibliography ==
- 2000 AD (Fleetway Publications, #589, 644, 1988, 1989)
- Crisis (Fleetway Publications, #32, 40-41, 43-44, 1989-1990)
- Deadline (#24, 1990, Script by Alan Martin)
- Judge Dredd Mega-Special (Fleetway Publications, #4, 1991)
- The Sandman (DC/Vertigo, #62, 1994, script by Neil Gaiman)
- Shade the Changing Man (DC/Vertigo, #34, 38, 40-41, 46, 1994, script by Peter Milligan)
- Egypt issue 1 (pencils and inks) and issue 2 (pencils) and covers issues 1-7 (DC/Vertigo, 1995, script by Peter Milligan)
- The Nao of Brown (SelfMadeHero, 2012, ISBN 9781906838423)

== Awards ==
- 2013: Angoulême Festival, Jury's Special Prize, for The Nao of Brown
- 2013: British Comic Awards, Best Book Category, for The Nao of Brown
- 2012: Broken Frontier Awards, Best Graphic Novel Category, for The Nao of Brown
- 2014: Treviso Comic Book Festival, Best Foreign Book Award, for "The Nao of Brown"
