= Paul Clinton =

American journalist

An undated photo of Clinton

Paul Clinton (1953 – January 30, 2006) was an American film critic. He served as CNN.com film critic for 20 years. He was the co-founder of the Broadcast Film Critics Association (BFCA).

Clinton was born in Columbus, Ohio and attended Ohio State University, majoring in broadcast journalism and then moved to New York City, where he became a page at NBC. He produced for The Tomorrow Show with Tom Snyder and then moved to Los Angeles to work on The Merv Griffin Show. Later he moved to KCBS-TV as an entertainment news producer.

In 1988, Paul Clinton began working on the Turner Entertainment Report and other media in the CNN family, where he started reviewing films. In addition to being a critic for CNN.com, his radio reviews and "Paul's Picks" pieces aired on more than 100 stations domestically and internationally.

Clinton and film historian James Ursini did audio commentary on the 2005 DVD release of Dark Victory (1939) starring Bette Davis.

Clinton died aged 53 on January 30, 2006, at the Cedars-Sinai Medical Center in Los Angeles, California.
