= Dead Awake (2016 film) =

- Directed by: Phillip Guzman
- Screenplay by: Jeffrey Reddick
- Produced by: Philip Guzman; Kurt Wehner; Philip Marlatt; Galen Walker; Derek Lee Nixon; James LaMarr
- Starring: Jocelin Donahue; Jesse Bradford; Jesse Borrego; Brea Grant; James Eckhouse; Lori Petty
- Cinematography: Dominique Martinez
- Edited by: Peter Devaney
- Music by: Marc Vanocur
- Production companies: Aristar Entertainment; Gama Entertainment Partners; Incendiary Features
- Release date: October 8, 2016 (Shriekfest Horror Film Festival)
- Running time: 99 minutes
- Country: United States

Dead Awake is a 2016 American supernatural psychological horror film written by Jeffrey Reddick and directed by Phillip Guzman. It stars Jocelin Donahue, Jesse Bradford, Jesse Borrego, Brea Grant, James Eckhouse, and Lori Petty.

== Plot ==
Kate Bowman is a by-the-books social worker who is investigating a series of deaths after her twin sister, Beth, suddenly dies under mysterious circumstances. Each victim suffered from sleep paralysis, a frightening ailment that immobilizes its victims as they dream. Kate is approached by an unorthodox doctor who warns of an evil entity that haunts people in their sleep. She brushes aside his admonition, but when a terrifying entity begins to haunt Kate's friends and loved ones, she must fight to stay awake to stop the nightmare.

After becoming convinced the monster is real, Kate teams up with Beth's boyfriend Evan, and meets up with the doctor again. They come up with a plan to allow her to fall asleep and inject her with adrenaline before the creature can kill her. She falls asleep and all seems to be going well, until the monster attacks and she shows no signs of being in sleep paralysis (her eyes are closed, and she seems to be sleeping peacefully). Evan notices something amiss, and figures out that she's in paralysis and under attack. They manage to administer the adrenaline just in time to wake her, apparently dispersing the creature and freeing Kate from its attacks.

As they prep to perform the same procedure on Evan, Kate suddenly realizes that her parents have the research on the phenomenon and could be under attack as well. They arrive at her parents' house, and find them doing just fine, after which, they head to Evan's apartment so Kate can shower and he can feed his kitten. While Kate is showering, Evan falls asleep, and the 'hag' monster emerges from a painting of it he created earlier in the film. As the monster attacks, Kate comes out of the shower and tries to revive him, unsuccessfully. Paramedics arrive on the scene, and he is seen being taken away while Kate looks on, despondent.

Kate visits him in the hospital to find out he's in a coma. The doctor arrives, and convinces Kate that she hasn't defeated the monster yet, and that she needs to go to sleep and break the sleep paralysis on her own in order to defeat it once and for all.

After seeing Kate to sleep, the doctor watches over her and sees her attacked by the monster but can't get his adrenaline pump to work. He goes to sleep as well, knowing the monster will come after him over Kate. Once he falls asleep, Kate is temporarily left alone and has a dream-within-a-dream sequence where she meets her sister. Her sister, Beth, begins to prey on her fears of being a bad sister, and the reason she's dead. Kate realizes Beth would not be saying the things she's saying, and attacks Beth, knowing it's really the Hag. She stabs the hag, then finds herself back in her 'real' body being choked by the Hag. She breaks her paralysis, and attacks the hag, strangling it (apparently) to death.

In the next scene, Kate is vlogging about her experiences and telling her audience that Evan has awoken, and her paralysis has come back, but that the Hag has not reappeared. She also promises her audience that she will not stop until she comes up with a permanent solution for everyone.

In the final scene, Dr. Sykes is seen asleep and wakes up to see the hag appearing over the end of her bed and proceeds to attack her, with the screen fading to black.

== Cast ==
- Jocelin Donahue as Beth/Kate Bowman
- Jesse Bradford as Evan
- Jesse Borrego as Dr. Hassan Davies
- Lori Petty as Dr. Sykes
- James Eckhouse as Mr. Bowman
- Mona Lee Fultz as Mrs. Bowman
- Brea Grant as Linda Noble
- AJ Gutierrez as Darryl Noble
- Billy Blair as Mr. Pang
- Liz Mikel as Nurse
- Jeffrey Reddick as Anthony
- Natali Jones as The Night Hag

== Release ==
The film premiered at Shriekfest on October 8, 2016.

== Reception ==
Dead Awake received negative reviews from critics. Review aggregation website Rotten Tomatoes gives the film an approval rating of 13%, based on 8 reviews, with no critics' consensus listed. On Metacritic, the film has no aggregate score, but the three reviews listed are unanimously negative. IMDB shows an average rating of 4.6 out of 10 with more than 2400 ratings.

== See also ==
- Mara, a 2018 film
