= Phoo Action =

- Terry Phoo & Whitey Action
- Genre: Comedy-drama
- Created by: Jamie Hewlett; Mat Wakeham
- Directed by: Euros Lyn
- Starring: Jaime Winstone; Eddie Shin; Carl Weathers
- Country of origin: United Kingdom
- Original languages: English; Cantonese

Original release
- Network: BBC Three
- Release: 12 February 2008

Phoo Action is a BBC Three 60 minute TV pilot, first broadcast in February 2008 as one of six drama pilots. It is based on Jamie Hewlett's comic strip Get the Freebies, which ran in The Face from June 1996 to June 1997. It stars Jaime Winstone as Whitey Action, Carl Weathers as Police Chief Benjamin "Ben" Benson and Eddie Shin as Terry Phoo.

A six-part series was commissioned to begin shooting later in 2008 for broadcast in 2009: however, shortly before production was due to begin the BBC announced that the series had been cancelled.

The show is set from the perspective of the disaffected teenage female protagonist, Whitey Action, who joins together with tough guy kung-fu cop Terry Phoo to form a dubious crime-fighting duo who thwart the plans of The Freebies Gang on the streets of London in 2012.

The screen adaptation was written by Matthew Enriquez Wakeham, Jessica Hynes and Peter Martin, and directed by Euros Lyn.

Production began in September 2007 at a number of Glasgow locations. Some scenes were shot inside the main studio at BBC Scotland's Pacific Quay Studios.

== Plot ==
Whitey Action is daughter of Ben Benson, the chief of the London Police. When Queen Elizabeth II is killed by a gang of mutants, known as The Freebies, Whitey guesses they are behind the murder while her father's forces focus their attentions on a single 'a mutant insurgent' suspect. Terry Phoo, a highly-trained combat cop from the Hong Kong Police Force is called in by Benson's superior, Lord Rothwell, as he is supposedly an expert at fighting mutants. However, his investigative skills leave much to be desired.

The Freebies are castigated by a mysterious group of sinister characters known as the Star Chamber for killing the Queen as they were supposed to mutate her, not murder her. The Freebies are given one last chance, demanding that William is mutated before he is crowned. While at a party in the Freebies nightclub, Whitey sees Princes William and Harry being led off by the Freebies, and she causes a big scene, preventing them from being captured but getting herself arrested by Terry Phoo. She convinces him that she is a special agent and he takes her to his hotel room. While looking for chocolate, she finds a case containing the Buddha's loincloth that transforms into a pair of hotpants, which she immediately tries on. She discovers that she can pull anything she desires from the pants, leading Phoo to decide that this means that she is the Chosen One.

Together Phoo and Action save the Princes from the evil plot to mutate them, and the subsequent plot to set the lead mutant, Jimmy Freebie, on the throne. The story ends, however, with William beginning to mutate during his coronation. The Freebies are eventually arrested for the Queen's murder.

== Reception ==
On 8 September 2007, before principal photography had begun, John Patterson writing in The Guardian, placed Phoo Action at number 13 in his list of '50 must-see shows' of Autumn.

On transmission, Phoo Action received mixed reviews. Michael Deacon, for The Daily Telegraph, wrote "BBC3 has had a revamp. Judging by Phoo Action, though, the channel remains unwavering in its commitment to diabolical television", whereas The Times' Andrew Billen "(found himself) enjoying to an almost indecent degree". Writing in The Independent, Hermione Eyre stated that "BBC3 struck gold with Phoo Action, a cult comedy in the making".

Audience figures were reported at 232,000, 105,000 fewer than the average for the time slot, with a proportionately lower audience share.

== Awards ==
The pilot featured in the "Best Pilots" section of the second annual Italian Global Series Festival, which took place in July 2008.

Phoo Action won the BAFTA Scotland award for best television drama.

== Cancellation ==
In February 2008, prior to the pilot's broadcast, the BBC announced that it had commissioned a six part series of Phoo Action, stating "We really believe in the originality and boldness of Phoo Action ... It's fantastic news that the work of Jamie Hewlett and the rest of the crew will be back on the channel." However, in November 2008 BBC Scotland notified the actors' union BECTU that production had been cancelled. The cost of cutting the show, which was due to start filming in November 2008, was reported to be approximately £500,000 in contract payments.
