= Tank Girl =

British comic book

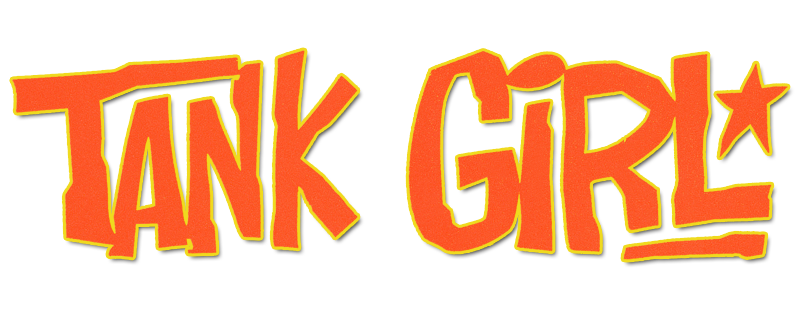

Publication information
- Publisher: Deadline Publications Ltd. Dark Horse Comics; DC Vertigo; IDW Publishing; Image Comics; Titan Comics
- First appearance: Deadline #1 (Oct. 1988)
- Created by: Alan Martin; Jamie Hewlett

In-story information
- Full name: Rebecca Buck (Fonzie Rebecca Buckler)
- Species: Human
- Place of origin: Earth
- Partnerships: Booga; Stevie; Barney; Sub Girl; Jet Girl
- Abilities: Can pilot any kind of tank; Random acts of sex and violence; Can outrun any ice cream van
Tank Girl
Publication information
- Schedule: Irregular
- Format: Limited series
- Genre: Independent Science fiction/Humour
- Main character(s): Tank Girl, Booga, Stevie, Barney, Sub Girl, Jet Girl, Camp Koala
Creative team
- Written by: Alan Martin, Alan Grant, Peter Milligan
- Artist(s): Jamie Hewlett, Philip Bond, Glyn Dillon, Ashley Wood, Warwick Johnson-Cadwell, Jim Mahfood, Brett Parson, Jonathan Edwards, Craig Knowles, Rufus Dayglo, Andy Pritchett, Mike McMahon

Tank Girl is a British comic character created by Alan Martin and Jamie Hewlett. It first appeared in print in 1988 in the British comics magazine Deadline, and then in the solo comic book series Tank Girl. After a period of intense popularity in the late 1980s and early 1990s, Tank Girl inspired a 1995 feature film. After a long hiatus, the character returned to comics in 2007 and has appeared regularly in the years since.

Originally written by Martin and drawn by Hewlett, the character has also been drawn by Philip Bond, Glyn Dillon, Ashley Wood, Warwick Johnson-Cadwell, Jim Mahfood, Brett Parson, Jonathan Edwards, Craig Knowles, Rufus Dayglo, Andy Pritchett, and Mike McMahon.

Tank Girl (Rebecca Buck – later revealed to have been born as Fonzie Rebecca Buckler) drives a tank, which is also her home. She undertakes a series of missions for a nebulous organization before making a serious mistake and being declared an outlaw for her sexual inclinations and her substance abuse. The comic centres on her misadventures with her boyfriend, Booga, a mutant kangaroo. The comic's irreverent style is heavily influenced by punk visual art, and strips are frequently deeply disorganized, anarchic, absurdist, and psychedelic. The strip features various elements with origins in surrealist techniques, fanzines, collage, cut-up technique, stream of consciousness, and metafiction, with very little regard or interest for conventional plot or committed narrative.

The strip was initially set in a post-apocalyptic (rendered self-fending due to an implied nuclear armageddon) Australia, although it drew heavily from contemporary British pop culture.

== Publication history ==
Martin and Hewlett first met in the mid-1980s in Worthing, while studying at The West Sussex College of Art and Design (WSCD, later renamed Northbrook College). Martin was in the college band The University Smalls with fellow comics enthusiast Philip Bond. One of their songs was called "Rocket Girl". They had started adding the suffix 'girl' to everything habitually after the release of the Supergirl movie, but "Rocket Girl" was a student at college on whom Bond had a crush and who apparently bore a striking resemblance the Love and Rockets character Hopey. Martin and Hewlett began collaborating on a comic/fanzine called Atomtan, and while working on this, Hewlett had drawn:

A grotty-looking beefer of a girl brandishing an unfeasible firearm. One of our friends was working on a project to design a pair of headphones and was basing his design on the type used by World War II tank drivers. His studio in Worthing was littered with loads of photocopies of combat vehicles. I pinched one of the images and gave it to Jamie who then stuck it behind his grotty girl illustration and then added a logo which read 'Tank Girl'.

The image was published in the fanzine as a one-page ad, but the Tank Girl series first appeared in the debut issue of Deadline (1988), a UK magazine intended as a forum for new comic talent, and it continued until the end of the magazine in 1995.

Tank Girl became quite popular in the politicized indie counterculture zeitgeist as a cartoon mirror of the growing empowerment of women in punk rock culture. Posters, shirts, and underpants began springing up everywhere, including one especially made for the Clause 28 march against Margaret Thatcher's legislation. Clause 28 stated that a local authority "shall not intentionally promote homosexuality or publish material with the intention of promoting homosexuality" or "promote the teaching in any maintained school of the acceptability of homosexuality as a pretended family relationship." Deadline publisher Tom Astor said, "In London, there are even weekly lesbian gatherings called 'Tank Girl nights.'"

With public interest growing, Penguin, the largest publishing company in Britain, bought the rights to collect the strips as a book, and before long, Tank Girl had been published in Spain, Italy, Germany, Scandinavia, Argentina, Brazil and Japan, with several United States publishers fighting over the licence. Finally Dark Horse Comics won, and the strips were reprinted beginning in 1991, with an extended break in '92, and ending in September '93. A graphic novel-length story named Tank Girl: The Odyssey was also published in 1995 (released in four issues by Vertigo Comics), written by Peter Milligan and loosely inspired by Homer's Odyssey, Joyce's Ulysses, and a considerable quantity of junk TV. This was followed by another four issue series, Tank Girl: Apocalypse, written by Alan Grant and published by Vertigo from November 1995 to February 1996.

=== After 1996 ===
After the 1995 film, Hewlett went on to create the band Gorillaz with Blur's Damon Albarn. Martin has also played in various bands, and written various screenplays and scripts.

After a long publishing hiatus, the character returned in 2007 in Tank Girl: The Gifting, a four-issue limited series written by Martin and illustrated by Australian artist Ashley Wood, which was published by IDW Publishing. This was the first new Tank Girl comic material since the final two issues of the four issue series Tank Girl: Apocalypse in 1996. The four-issue limited series Tank Girl: Visions of Booga, by Martin and artist Rufus Dayglo, was released in 2008 by IDW, as was Tank Girl: Armadillo and a Bushel of Other Stories, a Tank Girl novel authored by Martin and published by Titan Books.

Since then, Tank Girl has appeared on a regular basis in various one-shots and limited series, published by IDW, Image Comics, and Titan Comics. The regular creative team is Alan Martin and Brett Parson.

Titan Books released The Hole of Tank Girl on 28 September 2012, which encompasses the original Hewlett and Martin material, as well as additional content.

The three-issue limited series 21st Century Tank Girl debuted on 10 June 2015.

Martin and artist Warwick Johnson-Cadwell have also created a kid-friendly spin-off called Young Tank Girl, published in the digital anthology Moose Kid Comics.

In 2019, Titan Comics debuted Tank Girl, publicized as Tank Girl's first ongoing series, with an indicia listing the book as Tank Girl Ongoing. From January to May 2019, the first four issues were cover-titled Tank Girl: Action Alley, and from July to December 2019, the next four issues were cover-titled Tank Girl Forever.

== Characters ==
- Tank Girl: Her real name in the strip is Rebecca Buck, but this is very rarely mentioned. She became a tank driver and worked as a bounty hunter, before shooting a heavily decorated officer, having mistaken him for her father, and failing to deliver colostomy bags to President Hogan, the incontinent Head of State in Australia, resulting in him publicly embarrassing himself at a large international trade conference. These events resulted in Tank Girl becoming an outlaw with a multi-million dollar bounty on her head. She is prone to random acts of sex and violence, hair dyeing, flatulence, nose picking, vomiting, spitting, and more than occasional drunkenness. She also has the ability to outrun any ice cream van – even Mr. Whippy. Tank Girl typically wears cut-off T-shirts or simply a bra, along with shorts and plenty of earrings and necklaces. Her natural hair color appears to be blonde, though she has appeared in many different hairstyles.
- Booga: A mutated kangaroo, formerly a successful toy designer of "products Santa would've sacrificed a reindeer for," and presently Tank Girl's devoted boyfriend. She met him when he sneaked into her tank one night to pinch a pair of her knickers. He is a big Dame Edna fan and once impersonated Bill Clinton. Booga, often against his will, always does the cooking, particularly the great British institution of tea. He follows Tank Girl everywhere and does, by his own admission, whatever she tells him. This includes murder.
- The talking stuffed animals:

- Camp Koala: A stitchy, brown, gay, koala-shaped stuffed toy described as "the Jeremy Thorpe of comics", whom TG sodomizes with a hot banana. Camp Koala died tragically when they were playing baseball with live hand grenades which Camp eagerly caught in the outfield, exploding on impact, resulting in a violent, bloody, and gruesome death. After a tearless and comical funeral service, the other characters go to a toy store and buy a new one. Camp Koala is known for visiting occasionally as a guardian angel. He is the only character TG has ever admitted to loving.
- Squeaky toy rat: A squeaky toy rat.
- Mr. Precocious: A "small Shakespearean mutant" who looks a bit like a mini bipedal pink elephant, though may possibly be a bilby.

- Stevie: A wild-haired blond Aboriginal man who owns a convenience store and chain-smokes. Since he is TG's ex-boyfriend, Booga is always a bit jealous of him. He has various familial ties and connections with Aboriginal culture and remote traditionalist tribespeople.
- Barney: Busted out of a mental hospital by TG, she is more or less insane. In The Odyssey, she is responsible for killing the whole cast, thereby sending them all to the land of the dead, from which TG was forced to save them by finding the Prince of Farts.
- Sub Girl (real name unknown, although a trading card for the film once listed her real name as 'Subrina'): Described as "like a beautiful flower floating in the loo", she pilots a submarine. A friend of TG's since childhood, she used to come round her house with Jet Girl and try on her mum's underwear.
- Jet Girl (real name unknown): A talented mechanic who flies a jet. All her friends call her "boring" (she has admitted to being a big fan of Rod Stewart).

== Collected editions ==
Tank Girl has been collected into a number of trade paperbacks over the years. The entire back catalogue was reprinted by Titan Books in 2002 and these books were "re-mastered" in anniversary editions, stripped of their subsequently-added computer colouring and line work repaired. In 2018 the entire Hewlett and Martin back catalogue was once again reprinted under the "Tank Girl Colour Classics" banner, this time as collectible hardbacks, with all-new colouring and extra material.

Title	Authors	ISBN	Release date	Comments
Graphic Novels and Collections
Tank Girl 1	Alan C. Martin; Jamie Hewlett	978-1840234350 (Reprint); 978-1845767570 (Remaster)	2002-04-26 (Reprint); 2009-04-24 (Remaster)	Consists of the first 15 stories, originally published in Deadline magazine, starting Sept. 1988, all originally in black and white.
Tank Girl 2	Alan C. Martin; Jamie Hewlett	978-1840234923 (Reprint); 978-1845767594 (Remaster)	2002-06-21 (Reprint); 2009-04-24 (Remaster)	Consists of the next 17 stories, some colour, some black and white.
Tank Girl 3	Alan C. Martin; Jamie Hewlett	978-1840234930 (Reprint); 978-1845767617 (Remaster)	2002-10-25 (Reprint); 2009-07-24 (Remaster)	Rounds up a final 9 stories, including some featuring Booga as the star. Some colour, some black and white.
Tank Girl – The Odyssey	Peter Milligan; Jamie Hewlett	978-1840234947 (Reprint); 978-1845767631 (Remaster)	2002-12-27 (Reprint); 2009-09-25 (Remaster)	Consists of four full colour issues released between June and October 1995, published by DC's Vertigo imprint.
Tank Girl – Apocalypse	Alan Grant; Andy Pritchett; Philip Bond	978-1840237252 (Reprint); 978-1845767655 (Remaster)	2003-08-21 (Reprint); 2010-02-26 (Remaster)	Consists of four full colour issues released between November 1995 and February 1996, published by DC's Vertigo imprint.
Tank Girl – Movie Adaptation	Peter Milligan; Andy Pritchett	978-1563892196	1995-03-28	A graphic novel adaptation of the movie released by Penguin Books in 1995. This was not reprinted or remastered by Titan Books
Tank Girl: The Gifting	Alan C. Martin; Ashley Wood	978-1845761707	2007-11-23	Four-issue limited series published by IDW Publishing. The first new Tank Girl comic material since 1996.
Tank Girl: Visions of Booga	Alan C. Martin; Rufus Dayglo	978-1848561663	2008-11-28	Four-issue limited series published by IDW Publishing
Tank Girl: Skidmarks	Alan C. Martin; Rufus Dayglo	978-1848566811	2010-07-30	12-part series in Judge Dredd Megazine, re-published by Titan Comics as a four-issue limited series
Tank Girl: The Royal Escape	Alan C. Martin; Rufus Dayglo	978-0857681249	2011-02-25	Four-issue limited series published by IDW Publishing
We Hate Tank Girl	Alan C. Martin; Rufus Dayglo	978-1607063490	2011-01-19	Collecting the Tank Girl one-shots: Dark Nuggets, Dirty Helmets, and Hairy Heroes by Image Comics
Tank Girl: Bad Wind Rising	Alan C. Martin; Rufus Dayglo	978-0857687425 (Hardcover); 978-0857681188 (Paperback)	2012-01-27 (Hardcover); 2014-12-31 (Paperback)	Four issue limited series published by Titan Comics
Tank Girl: Carioca	Alan C. Martin; Mike McMahon	978-0857687432	2012-10-26	Collecting the six-issue limited series published by Titan Comics
Tank Girl: Everybody Loves Tank Girl	Alan C. Martin; Jim Mahfood	978-0857687500	2013-02-22	Collecting the three-issue limited series published by Titan Comics
Tank Girl: Solid State Tank Girl	Alan C. Martin; Warwick Johnson-Cadwell	978-1782760030	2014-01-14	Collecting the four-issue limited series published by Titan Comics
21st Century Tank Girl	Alan C. Martin; Jamie Hewlett; Brett Parson; Craig Knowles; Jim Mahfood; Jonathan Edwards; Philip Bond; Warwick Johnson-Cadwell	978-1782766612	2015-11-04	Collecting the three-issue limited series published by Titan Comics (originally self-published in 2014 by Alan Martin/Action Alley as a Kickstarter project)
Tank Girl: Two Girls, One Tank	Alan C. Martin; Brett Parson	978-1785853562	2016-12-06	A four-issue limited series published by Titan Comics; first part of a trilogy
Tank Girl: Gold	Alan C. Martin; Brett Parson	978-1-78585-525-2 (1-78585-525-5)	2017-04-25	A four-issue limited series published by Titan Comics; second part of a trilogy
World War Tank Girl	Alan C. Martin; Brett Parson	978-1785855269	2017-11-17	A four-issue limited series published by Titan Comics; third and final chapter of the trilogy
The Wonderful World of Tank Girl	Alan C. Martin; Brett Parson	978-1785862076	2018-08-28	A four-issue limited series comprising four stand-alone stories. Published by Titan Comics.
Tank Girl Colour Classics Book One	Jamie Hewlett; Alan C. Martin	978-1785866753	2018-12-11	A hardback collection of the original Hewlett & Martin strips (previously Tank Girl One), recoloured for the 30th anniversary, augmented with unseen material. Published by Titan Comics.
Tank Girl All Stars	Alan C. Martin; Brett Parson, et al.	978-1785864803	2019-01-29	A four-issue limited series of short stories and prose pages, featuring a host of Tank Girl artists, celebrating Tank Girl's 30th anniversary. Published by Titan Comics.
Tank Girl: Action Alley	Alan C. Martin; Brett Parson	978-1785864810	2019-08-13	The first four-issue arc of Tank Girl's first ongoing series. Published by Titan Comics.
Tank Girl Colour Classics Book Two	Jamie Hewlett; Alan C. Martin	978-1785866777	2019-09-24	A hardback collection of the original Hewlett & Martin strips (previously Tank Girl Two), recoloured for the 30th anniversary, augmented with unseen material. Published by Titan Comics.
Tank Girl Forever	Alan C. Martin; Brett Parson	978-1787730304	2020-02-25	The second four-issue arc of Tank Girl's first ongoing series. Published by Titan Comics.
Tank Girl Colour Classics Book Three	Jamie Hewlett; Alan C. Martin	978-1787734081	2020-05-26	A hardback collection of the original Hewlett & Martin strips (previously Tank Girl Three), recoloured for the 30th anniversary, augmented with unseen material. Published by Titan Comics.
'King Tank Girl	Alan C. Martin; Brett Parson	978-1787739611	2022-10-18	A five-issue limited series. Series published by Albatross Funnybooks. Soft cover collection published by Titan Comics.
Tank Girl: Book One, Anniversary Edition	Jamie Hewlett; Alan C. Martin	979-8866302116	2023-11-18	The original black and white comic collection, first published by Penguin Books in 1990. Published in soft and hard cover by Action Alley Ltd.
Omnibus Editions
The Hole of Tank Girl	Jamie Hewlett; Alan C. Martin	978-0857687449	2012-09-28	A hardcover, large-format book with slipcase, collecting the first three Hewlett & Martin books (with extra archive material) by Titan Books
The Power of Tank Girl	Alan C. Martin; Ashley Wood; Rufus Dayglo	978-1782760641	2014-09-30	An omnibus edition compiling the three Tank Girl graphic novels The Gifting, Visions of Booga, and The Royal Escape published by Titan Comics
Total Tank Girl	Alan C. Martin; Warwick Johnson-Cadwell; Rufus Dayglo; Jim Mahfood	978-1785863059	2017-10-10	An omnibus edition compiling the three graphic novels Everybody Loves Tank Girl, Bad Wind Rising, and Solid State Tank Girl published by Titan Comics
The Legend of Tank Girl	Alan C. Martin; Brett Parson	978-1785864643	2018-09-11	An oversized, hardback omnibus edition, celebrating Tank Girl's 30th anniversary, compiling the trilogy of graphic novels Two Girls One Tank, Tank Girl Gold, and World War Tank Girl. Published by Titan Comics.
Dirty Old Tank Girl	Alan C. Martin; Rufus Dayglo; Mick McMahon	978-1785869822	2019-03-19	An omnibus edition compiling the two graphic novels Tank Girl: Skidmarks, and Tank Girl: Carioca. Published by Titan Comics.
Tank Girl: Colour Classics Trilogy (1988–1995) Slipcase Set	Jamie Hewlett; Alan C. Martin	978-1787739468	2022-09-06	The original Hewlett & Martin strips, recoloured for the 30th anniversary, augmented with unseen material. Presented in soft cover editions in a board slipcase, each book with a new cover. Published by Titan Comics.
Tank Girl Trilogy Slipcase Set	Alan C. Martin Brett Parson	978-1787744929	2024-11-12	Three previously published graphic novels, comprising one complete story arc - Two Girls One Tank, Tank Girl Gold, and World War Tank Girl. Presented in soft cover editions in a board slipcase, each book with a new cover. Published by Titan Comics.
Tank Girl: Unclenched Slipcase Set	Alan C. Martin; Jamie Hewlett; Brett Parson; Craig Knowles; Jim Mahfood; Jonathan Edwards; Philip Bond; Warwick Johnson-Cadwell, et al.	978-1787747722	2025-09-16	Three previously published anthology collections - 21st Century Tank Girl, The Wonderful World of Tank Girl, and Tank Girl All Stars - presented in soft cover editions in a board slipcase, each book with a new cover. Published by Titan Comics.
Art, Prose, and Colouring books
Tank Girl: Armadillo and a Bushel of Other Stories	Alan C. Martin	978-1845764845	2008-03-21	A fiction prose novel with cover art by Jamie Hewlett
The Cream of Tank Girl	Alan C. Martin; Jamie Hewlett	978-1845769420	2008-10-24	A retrospective art book by Titan Books
The Way of Tank Girl	Alan C. Martin; Jamie Hewlett; Ashley Wood; Brett Parson	978-1785864636	2018-04-17	A square format art book, featuring artwork and panels taken from Tank Girl's back catalogue, along with new and unseen material. Published by Titan Comics.
Tank Girl Colouring Book	Alan C. Martin; Jamie Hewlett; Brett Parson	978-1785867514	2018-10-16	An oversized, square format paperback, featuring black and white line art. Published by Titan Comics.
The Tank Girl Tattoo Colouring Book	Alan C. Martin; Jamie Hewlett; Brett Parson	979-8882804038	2024-02-25	Paperback featuring black-and-white illustrations, printed on single sided pages to aid in the design of tattoos. Published by Action Alley Ltd.

== Film ==
The comic was also adapted into a critically and financially unsuccessful film, albeit with a small cult following. The film featured Lori Petty as Tank Girl and Naomi Watts as Jet Girl. Martin and Hewlett are known for speaking poorly of the experience, with Martin calling it "a bit of a sore point" for them.

In September 2019, a Tank Girl reboot movie was reported to be in development with Margot Robbie's production company LuckyChap Entertainment optioned rights from MGM, Robbie co-produce with her partners Tom Ackerley and Josey McNamara, Mallory Westfall writing and Miles Joris-Peyrafitte directing.

== See also ==
- Action Girl Comics
- The Invisibles
- Kill Your Boyfriend
- Lesbian pulp fiction
- Portrayal of women in comics
- Riot Grrrl
