= David Crossman (costume designer) =

British costume designer (born 1970)

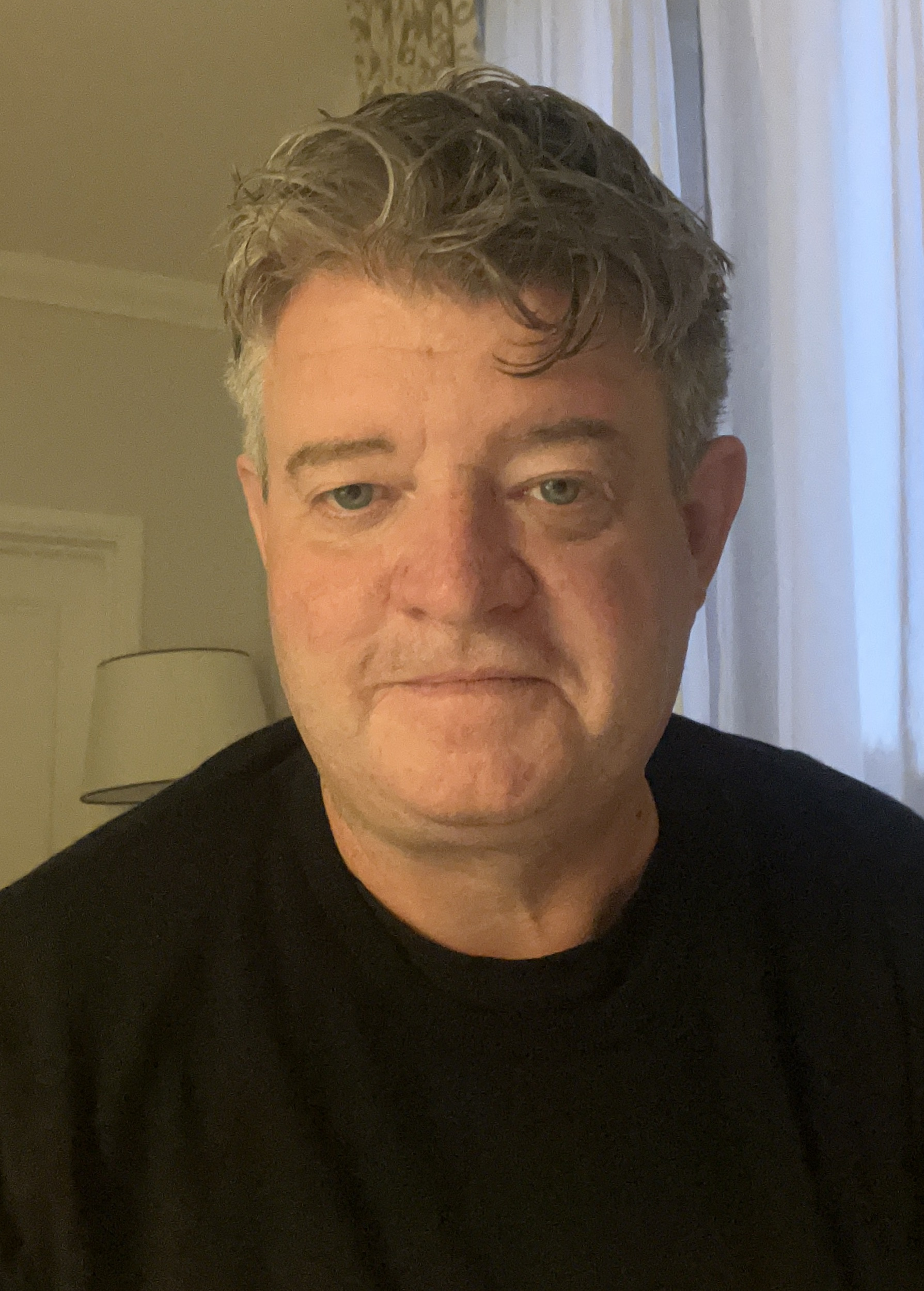
- Crossman in 2023
- Born: David Crossman; 12 February 1970 (age 56); London, England
- Other name: Dave Crossman
- Education: Gunnersbury Boys' School
- Occupation: Costume designer
- Years active: 1997–present
- Spouse: Victoria Crossman
- Children: 2

David Crossman (born 12 February 1970), is a British costume designer for film and television. He is best known for his work on Napoleon, The Batman, 1917 and Rogue One.

At the 96th Academy Awards, he was nominated for an Academy Award in the category Best Costume Design for the film Napoleon. His nomination was shared with Janty Yates. At the 97th Academy Awards, he was nominated for another Academy Award in the same category for the film Gladiator II. His nomination was again shared with Yates.

== Career ==
Crossman began his career in costume in working at the costume hire company Bermans & Nathans. After moving in to the film industry his first break came working on the film Saving Private Ryan. In the subsequent years Crossman has worked with directors ranging from Mike Leigh, Steven Spielberg, J. J. Abrams, Ridley Scott and Alfonso Cuarón. With Glyn Dillon he has co- designed two Star wars films, Rogue One and Solo, as well as co designing the Bat suit for Matt Reeves The Batman. He also worked alongside Jacqueline Durran as designer on Sam Mendes’s 1917. More recently he designed the uniforms for Ridley Scott's Napoleon & Gladiator 2, for which he was nominated twice in a row for an Academy Award for Best Costume Design.

== Filmography ==
=== Film ===
Year	Title	Director	Notes	Ref.
1999	The Trench	William Boyd	with Lindy Hemming	
2008	Walter’s War	Alrick Riley	Television film	
2016	Rogue One	Gareth Edwards	with Glyn Dillon	
2018	Solo: A Star Wars Story	Ron Howard	with Glyn Dillon	
2019	1917	Sam Mendes	with Jacqueline Durran	
2022	The Batman	Matt Reeves	Batsuit only. With Glyn Dillon. Other costumes designed by Jacqueline Durran	
2023	Napoleon	Ridley Scott	Military costumes only. Other costumes designed by Janty Yates	
2024	Gladiator II	Ridley Scott	Military costumes only. Other costumes designed by Janty Yates	
2025	Warfare	Alex Garland Ray Mendoza	with Neil Murphy	
2026	Project Hail Mary	Phil Lord; Christopher Miller	with Glyn Dillon	
2026	The Great Beyond	J.J. Abrams	with Glyn Dillon	
