= Alex Karmel =

- Born: September 15, 1931; New York City, New York, U.S.
- Died: October 24, 2015 (aged 84); Dourdan, France
- Occupation: Writer
- Spouse(s): Marjorie Karmel (died 1964) Marianne Servouze (m. 1975)
- Children: 3

Alex Karmel (September 15, 1931 – October 24, 2015) was an American writer. He wrote three novels, including Mary Ann (1958), which was adapted into the film Something Wild (1961). He was also an author of non-fiction, including A Corner in the Marais (1998), which documented fifteen years of his life spent living in Paris.

== Biography ==
Karmel was born September 15, 1931, in New York City. His debut novel, Mary Ann, was published in 1958 by Viking Press. Karmel co-adapted the novel into a screenplay for the film adaptation Something Wild (1961) with director Jack Garfein.

He was married to his first wife, Marjorie Karmel, until her death in 1964. The couple had three children. He later married French actress Marianne Servouze.

Karmel died of cancer at his home in Dourdan, France on October 24, 2015.

== Works ==
=== Novels ===
- Mary Ann (1958, Viking)
- Last Words (1968, McGraw-Hill)
- My Revolution: Promenades in Paris 1789-1794 (1970, McGraw-Hill)

=== Non-fiction ===
- Guillotine in the Wings (1972, Dorley House)
- A Corner in the Marais (1998, Godine)

=== Screenplays ===
- Something Wild (1961, co-written with Jack Garfein)
