= Jamie Hewlett =

British comic book artist (born 1968)

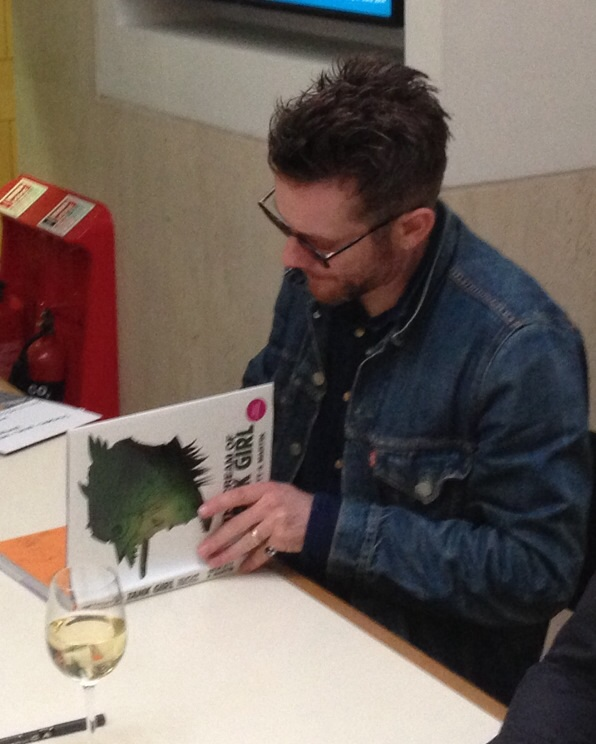
- Hewlett in 2014
- Born: Jamie Christopher Hewlett; 3 April 1968 (age 58) Hawarden, Flintshire, Wales
- Areas: Comic book artist, illustrator, director, key animator
- Pseudonyms: Hewll, J.C. Hewlett, J. Weasel
- Notable works: Gorillaz; Tank Girl; Monkey: Journey to the West; Get the Freebies / Phoo Action
- Awards: Design Museum's Designer of the Year (2006); Ivor Novello's Songwriter of the Year (2006)
- Spouse: Emma de Caunes (m. 2011)
- Children: 2

Jamie Christopher Hewlett (born 3 April 1968) is a British comic book artist and illustrator. He is the co-creator of the comic book Tank Girl with Alan Martin, and the virtual band Gorillaz alongside Blur frontman Damon Albarn.

== Biography ==
=== Early life ===
Brought up in Horsham, West Sussex, Jamie Hewlett was a pupil at Tanbridge House School, a comprehensive for pupils aged 11–16 years. In 1983 he worked in the Wardour Street studios of Oscar Award-winning animator Bob Godfrey. Hewlett created the original artwork for a pilot animated cartoon series for Thames Television directed by Bob Godfrey with voiceovers by Peter Hawkins, the voice of Bill & Ben. He attended Horsham Arts School and Worthing Art College.

While studying at Northbrook College Worthing, Hewlett, Alan Martin and fellow student Philip Bond created a fanzine called Atomtan. This brought him to the attention of Brett Ewins. After leaving college, Hewlett and Martin were invited by Ewins to create material for a new magazine he was setting up with Steve Dillon in 1988.

=== Early career ===
A magazine called Deadline featured a mixture of comic strips produced by English creators like Hewlett and articles on music and culture. Martin and Hewlett created Tank Girl, an anarchic strip about a teenage punk girl who drove a tank and had a mutant kangaroo for a boyfriend. The strip proved instantly popular and quickly became the most talked-about part of Deadline. Hewlett's eccentric style proved popular and he started to work with bands Senseless Things and Cud providing covers for record releases; he also contributed artwork sporadically to Commodore User magazine.

He designed decor for a nightclub called The Factory in Chatsworth Road, Worthing. The decor featured red and green stripes, a wall of blown-up panels from Tank Girl set against 1970s wallpaper, a Ford Escort hung from the ceiling, and toilets pasted with pages from old comic book annuals. The Factory has since been refurbished and renamed several times.

By 1992, Hewlett had become a major creator in the comics industry, and one of the few to break into mainstream media. He had worked with writer Peter Milligan on Hewligan's Haircut in 2000 AD issues 700 to 707. The series was later compiled into a trade paperback. He was involved in providing covers and art for Shade, the Changing Man, also written by Milligan, for DC Comics.

Tank Girl was optioned to be made into a film by MGM after being considered by, among others, Steven Spielberg. The film was released in 1995 and featured Lori Petty as Tank Girl. It was a commercial and critical failure and was criticized by fans who said it failed to capture the essence of the original strip. Hewlett had very little involvement with the film.

Hewlett drew a Tank Girl mini-series for the Vertigo imprint of DC Comics written by Peter Milligan.

He opened a secondhand clothing store, 49. The shop, at 49 Rowlands Road, Worthing, was managed by girlfriend Jane Oliver, originally a member of Elastica, but this was a short-lived venture and closed within a year.

Hewlett was still involved with English bands of the mid-1990s, including illustrating a comic strip version of Pulp's song "Common People".

Deadline was eventually cancelled in 1996 due to falling sales in a changed market and Hewlett concentrated on working in advertising and designs for television, most notably the children's series SMTV Live, featuring Ant & Dec. In 1996, he created the strip Get the Freebies, which was published monthly in English fashion magazine The Face. The stories, all set in London, followed the exploits of Terry Phoo, a gay, Buddhist kung-fu law enforcement officer and his sidekick Whitey Action, an enigmatic young anarchist with a bad attitude, as they tackle their primary adversaries The Freebies Gang. The dynamic between the two heroes was much like that of Tank Girl and her mutant kangaroo boyfriend Booga, with the episodes from the female protagonist's point of view. The strip's primary function was for Hewlett to vent his spleen against the media idols and trends of the day, the story often taking second place to the jokes. The strip ran for 12 issues.

On 2 March 1996, his first son, Denholm Sweeney Hewlett was born.

=== 21st century ===
In 1998, he moved into a flat with Blur's Damon Albarn after Hewlett split with Oliver, and it was while sharing the flat that the pair came up with the idea of Gorillaz, a virtual band. Albarn would work on the music, while Hewlett would come up with character designs, and both came up with ideas for the members of the band. The first Gorillaz EP was released in 2000 followed by the first album, Gorillaz in 2001. In 2005, their second full studio album, Demon Days was released.

On 2 April 2000, his second son, Rocky Serpico Hewlett was born.

In January 2006, Hewlett's artwork for Gorillaz was shortlisted for the Design Museum's Designer of the Year award. In May 2006, he was named the Designer of the Year 2006. On 25 May 2006, Hewlett and Albarn won the joint award for Songwriters of the Year at the Ivor Novello Awards.

In 2007, Hewlett and Albarn premiered their first major work since Gorillaz, entitled Monkey: Journey to the West, a re-working of the ancient Chinese legend Journey to the West. Albarn wrote the score whilst Hewlett designed the set, animations and costumes. Written and adapted by Chen Shi-zheng, the show featured 45 Chinese circus acrobats, Shaolin monks and Chinese vocalists. It premiered at the Palace Theatre, Manchester as part of the Manchester International Festival, on 28 June 2007.

His Get the Freebies strip was adapted by BBC Three for a pilot entitled Phoo Action, broadcast in February 2008.

Hewlett and Albarn created the animation sequence the BBC used to introduce coverage of the Beijing 2008 Olympics. The sequence titled Journey to the East uses the Monkey character from Monkey: Journey to the West.

He married French presenter and actress Emma de Caunes at Saint-Paul-de-Vence on 10 September 2011.

A 2014 Kickstarter campaign successfully raised the capital for a new Tank Girl book called 21st Century Tank Girl featuring co-creators Hewlett and Martin, as well as other artists, including Brett Parson, Warwick Johnson-Cadwell, Philip Bond, Jim Mahfood, Craig Knowles, and Jonathan Edwards.

In November 2015, Hewlett debuted his first art exhibition called The Suggestionists at the Saatchi Gallery in London. The exhibition then made its American debut at the Woodward Gallery in Manhattan in May 2016.

In 2017, Taschen published a large format monograph of Hewlett's work across 25 years.

The Gorillaz Art Book was published in 2022 where Hewlett’s original creations featured alongside those of over 40 artists invited by Hewlett to make work inspired by the world of Gorillaz.

In 2023, www.jamiehewlett.com launched with Warriors, a first collection of limited edition artworks that spans 27 years.

== Influences ==
In a 2013 interview with Consequence of Sound, Hewlett stated that his primary influences were the works of cartoonists such as Mort Drucker, Carl Giles, Jack Davis, and "Ronald" (sic) Lowe.

In a 2012 interview for Absolut Vodka, Hewlett also listed Harvey Kurtzman's American satirical magazine MAD Magazine as a leading influence of his art. Hewlett has mentioned that he is largely influenced by the works of American animator Chuck Jones of Looney Tunes, and cites the works of British comic book artists Ronald Searle and Mike McMahon as influences on his artwork. In fact, Hewlett has even stated that the entirety of Chuck Jones' filmography and Mad Magazine as a whole are the biggest overall influences on his work.

Hewlett was influenced by not only the works of Chuck Jones, but also various UPA cartoons. Hewlett's Absolut London web profile also revealed that along with Chuck Jones, American filmmaker Stanley Kubrick and American author Hunter S. Thompson were big influences on his artwork as well. Hewlett has also admitted to being heavily inspired by the likes of artists such as Robert Crumb, Jean-Michel Basquiat, Martin Kippenberger, and Richard Caton Woodville.

During a 2012 Interview with Alfred Dunhill, he also lists the first film of the Star Wars series as another main influence on his artwork.

Hewlett has admitted to being a big fan of Brendan McCarthy's works, more specifically his work on his comic book Strange Days. Hewlett has said that French comic book artist Moebius is a big influence on his art, calling him 'unbelievably inspiring' and saying that he considers him to be 'one of the greatest'. In addition to Moebius, Hewlett has been heavily influenced by the works of artists Tony Hart and Tanino Liberatore. In an interview with The Telegraph, Hewlett also mentioned being a fan of American animator Brad Bird and his work on Family Dog, as well as American cartoonist Charles Schulz' Peanuts comic strips.

In a conversation with Mark Kermode, Hewlett said that the 1973 French animated film Fantastic Planet was the very first animated film that showed him animation is also a medium for adults.

== Works ==
=== Comics ===
Interior comics work includes:

- Tank Girl (art, with Alan Martin, in Deadline, 1988–1995)
- Judge Dredd: "Spock's Mock Chocs" (art, with writer Alan Grant and shared art duties with Brendan McCarthy, in 2000 AD #614, 1989, collected in Judge Dredd: The Complete Case Files Volume 12, October 2008)
- Sooner or Later: "Swifty's Return" (art, with writer Peter Milligan, in 2000 AD #614–617, 1989)
- King Pant (writer, with art by Philip Bond, in A1 #2, Atomeka Press, 1989, ISBN 1-871878-11-X)
- Hellcity (art, with writer Alan Martin, in A1 #4, Atomeka Press, 1990, ISBN 1-871878-56-X)
- Hell City II (art, with writer Alan Martin, in A1 True Life Bikini Confidential, Atomeka Press, 1990, ISBN 1-871878-69-1)
- Hewligan's Haircut (with writer Peter Milligan, in 2000 AD #700–707, 1990, collected in Hewligan's Haircut hardcover, August 2003)
- Doom Patrol #50 (with Grant Morrison, Vertigo, December 1991, collected in Doom Patrol Volume 4: Musclebound, August 2006)
- Tank Girl: She's Fucking Great (writer & art, in A1 #6, Atomeka Press, 1992)
- King Leon (art, with writer Peter Milligan, in A1 #2–4, Epic Comics, 1992)
- Tank Girl: The Odyssey (art, with writer Peter Milligan, 4-issue mini-series, Vertigo, 1995)
- Get the Freebies (writer & art, in The Face Vol. 2 #94 - Vol. 3 #5, 1996-1997)

==== Covers ====
Comics covers include:

- Shade, the Changing Man #14–22 (DC Comics, August 1991 – April 1992)
- Doom Patrol #52, 60 (with Grant Morrison, Vertigo, 1 February 1992, and 1 October 1992 collected in Doom Patrol Volume 5: Magic Bus, 2007 and Doom Patrol Volume 6: Planet Love, 2008)

=== Music ===
Musical projects include:

- The front cover of The Monkees (single, 12" and maxi-single) by Rampage
- Gorillaz
- The front and back cover, as well as additional booklet art, of the third Mindless Self Indulgence album, Frankenstein Girls Will Seem Strangely Sexy
- The back cover of The Good, the Bad & the Queen by The Good, the Bad & the Queen
- Monkey: Journey to the West
- Guitar Man logo for the annual Royal Albert Hall week of concerts for Teenage Cancer Trust
- Artwork for the first two albums by Senseless Things, as well as most singles released by the band in the same period.
- A bespoke comic strip tied to Pulp's "Common People" single for Island Records France
- Artwork for a release by Cud

=== Art ===
Artistic projects include:

- Under Water Colours – Old Truman Brewery – East London, 17–31 October 2009
- Honey – 2015
- Tarot – 2015
- Pines – 2015

== Awards ==
| Year | Award | Category | Work | Result | Ref. |
|---|---|---|---|---|---|
| 2006 | Design Museum | Designer of the Year | Gorillaz | Won | |
| 2008 | BAFTA | Best Titles | Opening credits for BBC's coverage of the 2008 Summer Olympics | Won | |
