= The Glass Shield =

1995 film by Charles Burnett

- Theatrical release poster
- Directed by: Charles Burnett
- Written by: Charles Burnett; John Eddie Johnson; Ned Welsh
- Produced by: Thomas S. Byrnes; Carolyn Schroeder
- Starring: Richard Anderson; Michael Boatman; Bernie Casey; Elliott Gould; Don Harvey; Ice Cube; Michael Ironside; Natalia Nogulich; Lori Petty; M. Emmet Walsh; Gary Wood
- Cinematography: Elliot Davis
- Edited by: Curtiss Clayton
- Music by: Stephen James Taylor
- Production company: CiBy 2000
- Distributed by: Miramax Films
- Release dates: August 1994 (Locarno); September 16, 1994 (TIFF); November 1994 (Stockholm); June 2, 1995 (United States)
- Running time: 109 minutes
- Country: United States
- Language: English
- Box office: $3.3 million (US)

The Glass Shield is a 1994 American crime drama film co-written and directed by Charles Burnett. It stars Michael Boatman and Lori Petty as rookie Deputy Sheriffs who uncover a conspiracy around the arrest of a suspect (Ice Cube). After a festival run, it was released in the United States on June 2, 1995, and grossed $3.3 million.

== Plot ==
John "J. J." Johnson is a rookie Deputy Sheriff in the Los Angeles Sheriff's Department. Because of his inexperience and race, he experiences tension with his white colleagues as their first black deputy. Although he initially clashes with Deputy Deborah Fields, the department's first female deputy, they strike up a friendship. While on patrol, Johnson backs up Deputy Bono when he stops a black man, Teddy Woods, at a gas station. When Bono runs Woods' drivers license, he finds a warrant for his arrest. Woods reveals he has a stolen pistol in his car, and the Deputy Sheriffs arrest him.

Deputy Fields is the second deputy to the scene of a murder, but Detectives Baker and Hall dismiss her observations. Mr. Greenspan says a black man murdered his wife in a botched robbery, and the detectives pressure Woods to confess after they trace his stolen pistol to the murder. Woods defiantly proclaims his innocence, frustrating his lawyer, James Locket, who advises him to show less attitude in court. At the same time, community activist Reverend Banks raises awareness of the death of a black prisoner whom he believes to have been murdered by the police while in custody. Johnson dismisses the concerns of his family and girlfriend, saying there is no evidence of this.

While coaching Bono on what to say at the trial, Johnson's commander, Clarence Massey, learns that Bono stopped Woods because of his race. Frustrated, Massey instructs him to come up with a better excuse. Bono suggests a traffic violation and later requests that Johnson back him up. Johnson agrees, and Massey praises him for his loyalty and dependability while chastising Fields for her refusal to fit in better. At the trial, Locket points out holes in the police testimony, making Johnson wonder if he made the right decision. Fields joins Johnson in investigating what really happened. With help from a whistleblower, they discover numerous cover-ups that involve Baker, Hall, and Massey.

As the trial progresses and Greenspan's testimony proves problematic, Massey has Baker murder Greenspan to prevent him from becoming a liability. Hall, sick from cancer, dies at the station. Tensions rise as Johnson and Fields continue pursuing their own investigation, and they become further paranoid when Johnson insists they were intentionally given faulty intelligence during a drug raid. After Fields is hospitalized following an assault, Johnson and Baker come to blows. Massey breaks them up and temporarily places Johnson in a jail cell. When released, he delivers incriminating evidence to Locket that implicates Baker in various crimes, including the murder of the black prisoner and framing Woods.

The jury can not reach a verdict. Facing a widespread investigation of police corruption that goes to the city council and mayor's office, the district attorney offers to drop the charges against Woods. Locket, with the reluctant backing of a city councilman, instead pushes for a new trial, which the judge accepts. Bono turns state's evidence and testifies against Johnson, admitting that the two committed perjury. Caught up in the probe, Johnson pleads guilty and receives a suspended sentence. After the Sheriff's station is disbanded, Massey retires, Baker is sentenced to four years and is in an honor prison while appealing. The unit is disbanded and the other Deputies including Bono are reassigned.

== Cast ==
- Erich Anderson as District Attorney Ira Kern
- Richard Anderson as Watch Commander Clarence Massey
- Michael Boatman as Deputy J.J. Johnson
- Bernie Casey as James Locket
- Ice Cube as Teddy Woods
- Victoria Dillard as Barbara Simms
- Elliott Gould as Greenspan
- Don Harvey as Deputy Jack Bono
- Tommy Hicks as Reverend Banks
- Michael Ironside as Detective Gene Baker
- Wanda De Jesus as Carmen Munoz
- Lori Petty as Deputy Deborah Fields
- M. Emmet Walsh as Detective Jesse Hall

== Production ==
The budget was under $5 million.

== Reception ==
Rotten Tomatoes, a review aggregator, reports that 68% of 25 surveyed critics gave the film a positive review; the average rating is 5.6/10. The website's critics consensus reads, "The Glass Shield struggles under the weight of its worthy themes, but emerges as a flawed yet powerful look at systemic racism in modern America." Todd McCarthy of Variety called it a "powerful moral drama" that addresses too many issues for one film. While commenting on how it presaged the O. J. Simpson murder trial, Caryn James of The New York Times called it smart and compelling. Peter Ranier of the Los Angeles Times wrote, "It's a rigorous, angry piece of work, but it misses out on the psychological depths that have made Burnett's previous films among the glories of recent American independent moviemaking." Hal Hinson of The Washington Post, in comparing it negatively to television cop dramas, described it as "a topical but otherwise unremarkable police drama". Michael Wilmington of the Chicago Tribune rated it 3/4 stars and wrote, "It's unusual to see a police thriller told with this kind of care, subtlety, thoughtfulness and creativity."

At the 1994 Locarno International Film Festival, Charles Burnett was nominated for the Golden Leopard.
