= A Deadly Legend =

- Directed by: Pamela Moriarty
- Written by: Eric Wolfe
- Starring: Corbin Bernsen; Lori Petty; Judd Hirsch
- Release date: July 10, 2020
- Running time: 97 minutes
- Country: United States
- Language: English

A Deadly Legend is a 2020 American horror film written by Eric Wolfe, directed by Pamela Moriarty and starring Corbin Bernsen, Lori Petty and Judd Hirsch.

== Cast ==
- Kristen Anne Ferraro as Joan Huntar
- Corbin Bernsen as Matthias Leary
- Lori Petty as Wanda Pearson
- Judd Hirsch as Carl Turner

== Release ==
The film was released on July 10, 2020.

== Reception ==
The film has a 33% rating on Rotten Tomatoes based on six reviews.

Alexandra Heller-Nicholas of AWFJ.org gave the film a positive review and wrote, "Some films are great, some achieve greatness, and some have greatness thrust upon them; A Deadly Legend is definitely the latter, and that greatness explicitly comes in the shape of Lori Petty’s brief but divine cameo."

Rob Rector of Film Threat rated the film a 3 out of 10, calling it "a hodge-podge of horror elements that never add up to anything of substance and undercut by a budget that is well under its aspirations."
