= Music for a Great City =

1964 orchestral composition by Aaron Copland

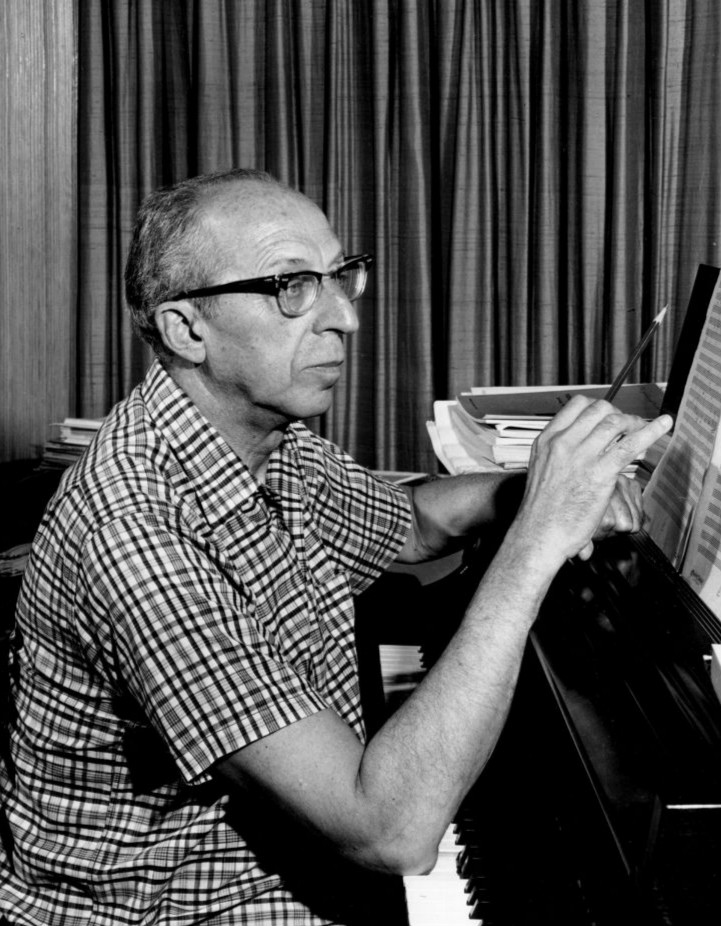
Aaron Copland in 1962

Music for a Great City is an orchestral composition by Aaron Copland completed in 1964. The piece was commissioned by the London Symphony Orchestra in celebration of its sixtieth anniversary season and is dedicated to the members of the orchestra. The music was first performed in the Royal Festival Hall on May 26, 1964, with Copland conducting.

== Composition ==
The piece is divided into four movements: "Skyline", "Night Thoughts", "Subway Jam", and "Toward the Bridge". Much of the material is derived from the score Copland wrote for the 1961 film Something Wild.

== Reception ==
Reception was divided after the London premiere, with Sydney Edwards of the Evening Standard calling it disappointing and likening it to a knock-off of West Side Story. However, in a special to The New York Times, Charles Osborne complimented the piece, although admitted that the city in question was clearly New York and not London.
