= Alan Martin (writer) =

British comics writer (born 1966)

- Born: Alan Charles Martin; 4 August 1966 (age 60) Worthing, Sussex, England
- Area: Writer
- Notable works: Tank Girl

Alan Charles Martin (born 4 August 1966) is a British comics writer best known as author of the comic strip Tank Girl.

== Hewlett and Martin ==
Martin first met Tank Girl co-creator Jamie Hewlett in 1986 when they were studying at the West Sussex College of Design in Worthing. With fellow student Philip Bond they began collaborating on a comic/fanzine called Atomtan.

The Tank Girl series first appeared in the debut issue of Deadline (1988), a UK magazine intended as a forum for new comic talent, or as its publishers Brett Ewins and Tom Astor put it, "a forum for the wild, wacky and hitherto unpublishable," and it continued until the end of the magazine in 1995.

=== Tank Girl film ===
In 1995, the comic was also adapted into a critically and financially unsuccessful film. The film featured Lori Petty as Tank Girl and Naomi Watts as Jet Girl.

Martin and Hewlett spoke poorly of the experience, with Martin calling it "a bit of a sore point" for them. After Deadline folded, Martin and Hewlett attempted to create another strip together called The 16s, which he described as a cross between Tank Girl and Peanuts. The strip was not published, and marked the end of their partnership.

== Since 1995 ==
After the film, Martin wandered around for a bit, staying at communes with hippie friends, looking for stone circles and ancient sites before settling in Berwick-upon-Tweed in Northumberland with his wife Lou and two children Wynne and Rufus Bodie (named after Lewis Collins' character in The Professionals). Martin has played in various bands, written a Tank Girl novel (Armadillo) published in March 2008 by Titan Books, as well as various screenplays and scripts. He wrote the first new Tank Girl limited series in over ten years: Tank Girl: The Gifting with Australian artist Ashley Wood. Published by American publishers IDW, the first issue was released in June 2007.

Since 2007, Martin has dedicated his time to the Tank Girl franchise, writing over a dozen graphic novels. In 2014, Martin, along with original artist Hewlett, launched 21st century Tank Girl as a Kickstarter. This was followed by the mini-series Two Girls One Tank. Since 2015, Martin has worked on Tank Girl projects with American artist Brett Parson.
