= Deadline (comics magazine) =

British comic magazine

- Cover of Deadline #1 (Oct. 1988), featuring an illustration of Tank Girl by Jamie Hewlett.

Publication information
- Publisher: Deadline Publications Ltd.
- Schedule: Monthly
- Format: Ongoing series
- Genre: Alternative comics
- Publication date: Oct. 1988 to Oct./Nov. 1995
- No. of issues: 71
- Main character: Tank Girl
- ISSN: 0957-3305

Creative team
- Created by: Brett Ewins; Steve Dillon
- Written by: Alan Martin, Peter Milligan
- Artist(s): Jamie Hewlett, Philip Bond, Nick Abadzis, D'Israeli, Shaky Kane, Al Columbia
- Editor(s): Steve Dillon and Brett Ewins; Dave Elliott; Si Spencer; Frank Wynne

Deadline was a British comics magazine that was published between 1988 and 1995.

Created by 2000 AD artists Brett Ewins and Steve Dillon, Deadline featured a mix of comic strips and written articles aimed at adult readers. Deadline sat at the forefront of the wave of British comics anthologies for mature audiences that included Crisis, Revolver and Toxic!, and had a cultural influence beyond the comics world, most notably via its breakout star Tank Girl. Deadline was published by Deadline Publications Ltd.

== History ==
The magazine's origins lie in the earlier publication Strange Days, an anthology title created by Ewins, Brendan McCarthy and Peter Milligan.

Much of the non-strip content centred on alternative and indie music. Coupled with the subversive nature of many of the comic strips, the magazine had a distinctive counterculture ethos and post-punk sensibility.

The magazine was owned and financed by Tom Astor (grandson of Nancy Astor), and initially edited by Steve Dillon and Brett Ewins before transferring editorship to Dave Elliott, then Si Spencer and finally Frank Wynne (a former staff member of Crisis and subsequently translator of Michel Houellebecq). Alongside original material, Elliott and Wynne also introduced reprints of American alternative comics such as Love and Rockets, Bob Burden's Flaming Carrot and Evan Dorkin strips such as Milk and Cheese. Elliott also arranged for content from the magazine to be reprinted in the US by Dark Horse Comics as Deadline USA.

=== Comic strips published in Deadline (selected) ===
- Tank Girl, created by the young team of writer Alan Martin and artist Jamie Hewlett
- Johnny Nemo by Brett Ewins and Peter Milligan
- Wired World, by Philip Bond
- Planet Swerve, by Alan Martin and Glyn Dillon
- Hugo Tate, by Nick Abadzis
- Cheeky Wee Budgie Boy, created and written by Jon Beeston, and drawn by Beeston and Philip Bond
- Timulo, by D'Israeli
- A-Men, by Shaky Kane
- Space Boss, by Shaky Kane
- Fireball by Jamie Hewlett
- Exit by Nabiel Kanan
- several early works by Al Columbia
- Box City, Ruby Chan by Rachael Ball
