= James Ursini =

American writer and educator

- Born: May 10, 1947 (age 78) Pittsburgh, Pennsylvania, US
- Occupation: Writer; Educator
- Education: M.A., Theater Arts, UCLA; Doctorate, Film, UCLA, 1975
- Genre: Documentaries on Film noir
- Years active: 1973–present

James Ursini (born May 10, 1947) is an American writer living in Los Angeles, and an educator.

== Biography ==
Born on May 10, 1947, in Pittsburgh, Pennsylvania, Ursini received his master's degree in Theater Arts and a Doctorate in Film in 1975 from UCLA.

He has written and/or edited over a dozen books—most with Alain Silver and two with Dominique Mainon (The Modern Amazons: Warrior Women On-Screen and Cinema of Obsession: Erotic Fixation and Love Gone Wrong in the Movies). He is noted for his work on film noir with Alain Silver (The Noir Style, The Film Noir Reader series, Film Noir, LA Noir, etc.) He has also done director studies on David Lean, Robert Aldrich, Preston Sturges, and Roger Corman and numerous DVD commentaries for Warner Bros., 20th Century-Fox, and The Criterion Collection. Books forthcoming in 2024 are From the Moment They Met It Was Murder, Double Indemnity and the Rise of Film Noir (Running Press/TCM) and The Films of David Lean (3rd edition, Pendragon Books).

He has also produced several features and short documentaries as well as appearing in documentaries on film noir.

== DVD commentaries ==
- Boomerang, with film historian Alain Silver
- Brute Force, with Alain Silver
- Burn!, with Alain Silver
- Call Northside 777, with Alain Silver
- Crossfire, with Alain Silver, plus audio interview excerpts of director Edward Dmytryk
- The Dark Corner, with Alain Silver
- Dark Victory, with CNN film critic Paul Clinton
- Hobson's Choice, with Alain Silver
- House of Bamboo, with Alain Silver
- Hustle, with Alain Silver
- Internal Affairs, with Alain Silver
- Invisible Stripes, with Alain Silver
- Kiss of Death, with Alain Silver
- Lady in the Lake, with Alain Silver
- The Longest Yard, with Alain Silver
- Nightmare Alley, with Alain Silver
- Out of the Past
- Panic in the Streets, with Alain Silver
- The River's Edge, with Alain Silver
- Smart Money, with Alain Silver
- The Street with No Name, with Alain Silver
- Twilight, with Alain Silver
- The Wayward Bus, with Alain Silver
- Where Danger Lives, with Alain Silver
