= Lori Petty =

American actress (born 1963)

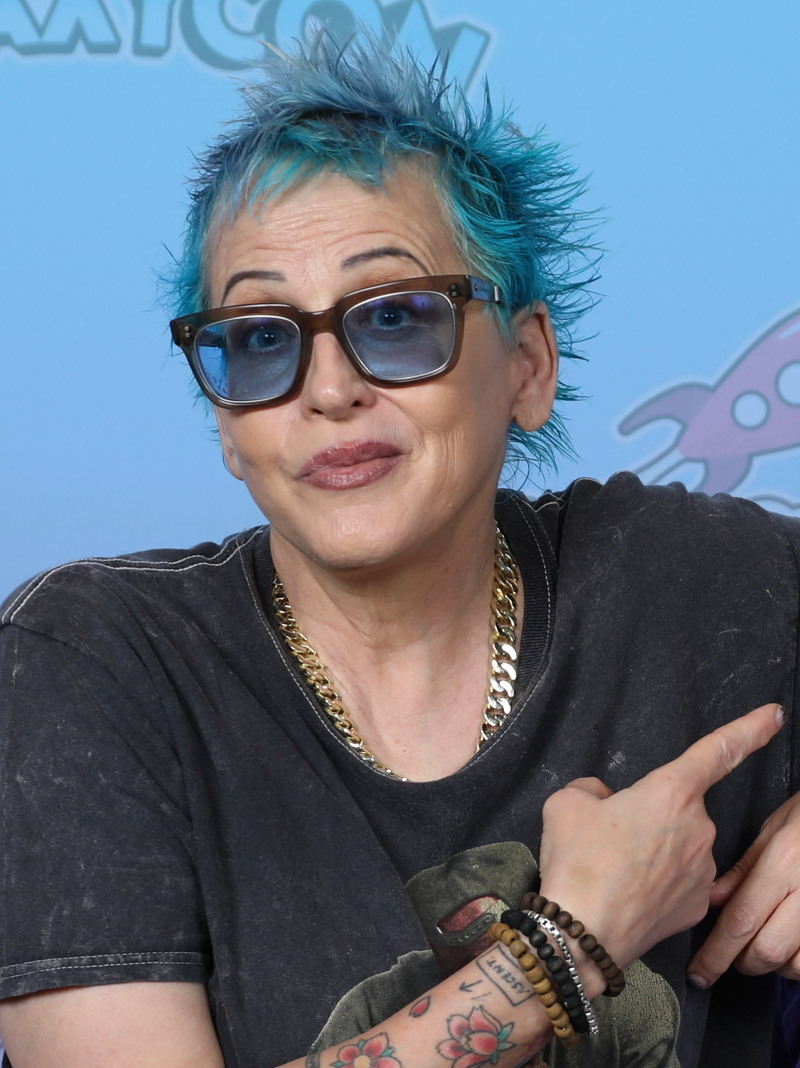
- Petty in 2023
- Born: October 14, 1963 (age 63); Chattanooga, Tennessee, U.S.
- Occupation: Actress
- Years active: 1984–present

Lori Petty (born October 14, 1963) is an American actress, director, and screenwriter. She made her big-screen debut appearing in the 1990 comedy film Cadillac Man and later starred in films Point Break (1991), A League of Their Own (1992), Free Willy (1993), In the Army Now (1994), The Glass Shield (1994) and played the title role in Tank Girl (1995). She created and starred in the short-lived Fox sitcom Lush Life in 1996 and acted in a number of independent movies in her later career. She also voiced the original character of Livewire in Superman: The Animated Series.

In 2008, Petty wrote and directed independent drama film The Poker House based on her early life during the 1970s. In 2014, she joined the Netflix comedy-drama series Orange Is the New Black as Lolly Whitehill as a guest star in the second season, and a recurring character in the third, fourth and seventh seasons.

== Early life ==
Petty, the eldest of three children, was born in Chattanooga, Tennessee, the daughter of a Pentecostal minister. She had a difficult upbringing after her mother left her abusive father and became addicted to drugs and became a sex worker, which left the young Petty responsible for her younger sisters. Petty graduated from North High School in Sioux City, Iowa in 1981. She worked in Omaha, Nebraska as a graphic designer for several years before pursuing acting.

== Career ==
Petty got her break playing a terrorist named Skunk on the ABC daytime soap opera All My Children in 1985. She later made guest starring appearances on television series such as The Equalizer, The Twilight Zone, Head of the Class, Miami Vice and Freddy's Nightmares. In 1987 she starred in the made-for-television horror film Bates Motel. The following year she appeared in the made-for-television movie Police Story: Monster Manor, and was regular cast member in the short-lived comedy series, The Thorns. In 1989, Petty co-starred in the made-for-television movie Perry Mason: The Case of the Musical Murder and from 1989 to 1990 was regular cast member in the Fox crime drama, Booker.

In 1990, Petty made her film debut as Robin Williams's wannabe fashion designer girlfriend in the dark comedy Cadillac Man. The following year, Petty played the surfer who taught Keanu Reeves how to surf in the 1991 action thriller Point Break directed by Kathryn Bigelow. In 1992, Petty starred in the sports comedy-drama film, A League of Their Own directed by Penny Marshall starring opposite Tom Hanks, Geena Davis and Madonna. The film was a critical and commercial success, grossing over $132.4 million worldwide. The following year she went to star in the family drama film Free Willy. Released on July 16, 1993, the film received positive attention from critics and was a commercial success, grossing $153.7 million from a $20 million budget. Later that year, Petty appeared in the urban romantic drama film Poetic Justice directed by John Singleton, in a movie being viewed during the film. In 1994 she starred in the police drama film The Glass Shield. It received positive reviews but was released only in selected theaters. Also in 1994, Petty starred in the comedy film In the Army Now. It was universally panned by critics but grossed $28,881,266 at the box office.

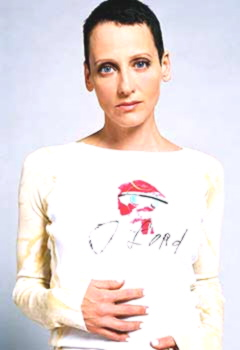
Lori Petty in 2010

In 1995, Petty played the title role in Tank Girl, an adaptation of the British cult comic book of the same name, directed by Rachel Talalay. Financially unsuccessful, Tank Girl recouped only about $6 million of its $25 million budget at the box office and received mixed reviews from critics. Despite the box-office failure of the film, it has since become a cult classic and has been noted for its feminist themes. The following year, Petty returned to television, starring and creating the short-lived sitcom Lush Life with her friend Karyn Parsons, but it was canceled after five episodes. She went to star in smaller-scale thriller films Countdown (1996), The Arrangement (1999), Firetrap (2001) and Route 666 (2001). She also was featured in the independent films Relax... It's Just Sex (1998), Clubland (1999), MacArthur Park (2001) and Prey for Rock & Roll (2003). In 2001, she made her directorial debut with the drama film Horrible Accident.

Petty made guest-starring appearances in a number of television series, include Profiler, Star Trek: Voyager, ER and NYPD Blue. She starred in a series of television commercials created by Merkley Newman Harty's Steve Bowen for the National Thoroughbred Racing Association's "Go, Baby, Go" advertising campaign in 1998. Petty also provided the voice of the supervillain Livewire on the Warner Bros. series Superman: The Animated Series and The New Batman Adventures, and the video game Superman: Shadow of Apokolips. Although she was originally cast as Lt. Lenina Huxley in Demolition Man, disagreements over the character's direction led producer Joel Silver to recast the role with Sandra Bullock. From 1998 to 1999 she had the recurring role on Brimstone as the owner of Stone's hotel. She narrated the first three books of Janet Evanovich's Stephanie Plum series—One for the Money, Two for the Dough and Three to Get Deadly in 2002. C. J. Critt read the unabridged version for Recorded Books. Petty read the abridgments for Simon & Schuster. In 2006 she starred in The Fair Haired Child, the episode of Showtime horror-anthology series Masters of Horror. She had the recurring role as Janice Burke, a woman with Huntington's disease, in the Fox series House from 2008 to 2009, and the following year played the role of "Daddy", an alpha female inmate, in Prison Break and its spin-off movie, Prison Break: The Final Break.

Petty directed and wrote the 2008 independent drama film The Poker House—a film dramatizing her own difficult childhood—which won awards at the Los Angeles Film Festival. It starred Jennifer Lawrence, Selma Blair and Chloë Grace Moretz. The film received mixed reviews from critics.

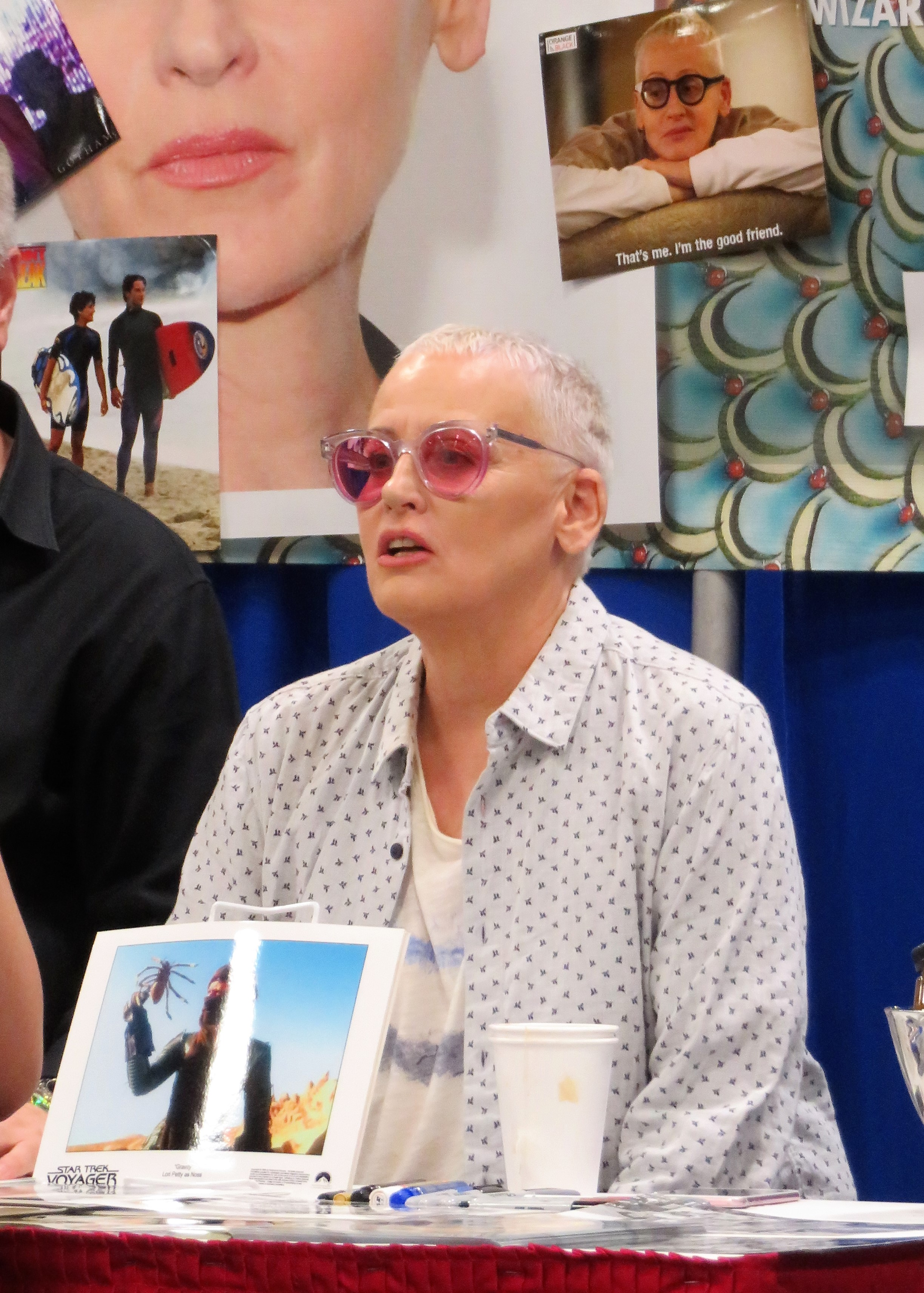
Petty at the 2017 Wizard World Columbus

In 2014, Petty was cast as Lolly Whitehill, an inmate with an interest in conspiracy theories in the Netflix comedy-drama series, Orange Is the New Black. She was a guest star in the second season and a recurring character in the third, fourth and seventh seasons, appearing in a total of 24 episodes. Along with the cast, she received a Screen Actors Guild Award for Outstanding Performance by an Ensemble in a Comedy Series in 2016 and 2017. She also made guest-starring appearances on Gotham, Hawaii Five-0 and Swedish Dicks. She appeared in horror films Dead Awake (2016), A Deadly Legend (2020) and You're All Gonna Die (2023). In 2021, she starred in the HBO miniseries Station Eleven. Since 2024 she has played recurring character Dr. Lenora Friedman on NCIS: Origins.

== Filmography ==
=== Film ===
Year	Title	Role	Notes
1988	...They Haven't Seen This...	The Girl	Short film
1990	Cadillac Man	Lila	
1991	Point Break	Tyler Ann Endicott	
1992	A League of Their Own	Kit Keller	
1993	Free Willy	Rae Lindley	Nominated – Kids' Choice Awards for Favorite Movie Actress
1993	Poetic Justice	Penelope	
1994	The Glass Shield	Deputy Deborah Fields	
1994	In the Army Now	Christine Jones	
1995	Tank Girl	Rebecca Buck / Tank Girl	
1996	Countdown	Sara Daniels	
1998	Relax...It's Just Sex	Robin Moon	
1999	The Arrangement	Candy Welsh	
1999	Clubland	India	
2001	MacArthur Park	Kelly	
2001	Firetrap	Lucy	
2001	Route 666	Deputy U.S. Marshal Stephanie 'Steph'	
2001	Horrible Accident	Six	Also director and writer
2003	Prey for Rock & Roll	Faith	
2006	Cryptid	Dr. Lean Carlin	
2007	Broken Arrows	Erin	
2008	The Poker House		Writer/director; Nominated – Los Angeles Independent Film Festival Award for Best Narrative Feature
2009	Prison Break: The Final Break	Daddy	Direct-to-video
2010	Chasing 3000	Deputy Fryman	
2014	Happy Fists Claudia	Brenda	
2016	Dead Awake	Dr. Sykes	
2018	Fear, Love, and Agoraphobia	Francis	
2020	A Deadly Legend	Wanda Pearson	
2021	The Survivalist	Radio Operator	
2023	You're All Gonna Die	Donatella	
TBA	Tonic	Elise Poe	Post-production

=== Television ===
Year	Title	Role	Notes
1985	The Equalizer	Brandi (Hooker)	Episode: "The Lock Box"
1986	The Twilight Zone	Lori Pendleton	Episode: "The Library"
1987	Stingray	Lisa Perlman	Episode: "Bring Me the Hand That Hit Me"
1987	Bates Motel	Willie	Television film
1987	Head of the Class	Molly	2 episodes
1988	The Thorns	'Cricket' Henshaw	Regular role (12 episodes)
1988	Miami Vice	Carol	Episode: "Love at First Sight"
1988	Freddy's Nightmares	Chris Ketchum	Episode: "Killer Instinct"
1988	Police Story: Monster Manor	Jeannie Pardonales	Television film
1989	Perry Mason: The Case of the Musical Murder	Cassie	Television film
1989	Alien Nation	Sally 'Sal'	Episode: "Fifteen with Wanda"
1989–1990	Booker	Suzanne Dunne	Recurring role (10 episodes)
1990	Grand	Medea	Episode: "A Boy and His Dad"
1996	Lush Life	Georgette 'George' Sanders	Regular role (7 episodes)
1997	Profiler	Robin Poole, Marjorie Brand	Episode: "Venom"
1997	Superman: The Animated Series	Leslie Willis / Livewire	Voice, 2 episodes
1998	The New Batman Adventures	Leslie Willis / Livewire	Voice, episode: "Girls' Night Out"
1998–1999	Brimstone	Maxine	Recurring role (7 episodes)
1999	Star Trek: Voyager	Noss	Episode: "Gravity"
2000	The Hunger	Lisette	Episode: "Double"
2001	The Beast	Rita	Episode: "The Delivery"
2001	The Parkers	Show Host	Episode: "Family Ties and Lies"
2002	ER	Shane	Episode: "Orion in the Sky"
2003	NYPD Blue	Joyce Bradovich	Episode: "I Kid You Not"; Nominated – Prism Award for Best Performance in a Drama Series Episode
2004	Line of Fire	Laurie McBride	Episode: "Mother & Child Reunion"
2004	The Karate Dog	COLAR	Voice, television film
2005	CSI: NY	Maddy	Episode: "Corporate Warriors"
2006	Masters of Horror	Judith	Episode: "Fair-Haired Child"
2008–2009	House	Janice Burke	3 episodes
2009	Prison Break	Daddy	3 episodes
2009	The Cleaner	'Sunshine'	2 episodes
2014–2019	Orange Is the New Black	Lolly Whitehill	Recurring role (24 episodes); Screen Actors Guild Award for Outstanding Performance by an Ensemble in a Comedy Series (2016–2017)
2016	Gotham	Jeri	Episode: "Wrath of the Villains: This Ball of Mud and Meanness"
2017	Hawaii Five-0	Jenny Kitson	Episode: "Wehe 'ana (Prelude)"
2017	Transformers: Robots in Disguise	Nightra	Voice, episode: "Guilty as Charged"
2017	Danger & Eggs	Ruelle, Madame Aubergine	Voice, episode: "Morning Routine/Lost & Found"
2017	Swedish Dicks	Madame Roux	Episode: "Dial M for Medium"
2018	Robot Chicken	Miss Grundy, Anna Mary Jones	Voice, episode: "Never Forget"
2019	Summer Camp Island	Ms. Pinch	Voice, episode: "I Heart Heartforde"
2021	Immortal Compass	Detective Williamson	Episode: "Part 10: Closure"
2021	Station Eleven	Sarah, The Conductor	Main cast, miniseries
2023	Obliterated	Crazy Susan	Episode: "Walks of Shame"
2024	NCIS: Origins	Dr. Lenora Friedman	Recurring role

=== Video games ===
Year	Title	Role
2002	Superman: Shadow of Apokolips	Leslie Willis / Livewire
