= Dominique Mainon =

American author, guerrilla artist, screenwriter and filmmaker

- Born: April 4, 1970; Hollywood, United States
- Died: January 26, 2012 (aged 41); California, United States of America
- Occupations: Author, screenwriter, filmmaker
- Website: web.archive.org/web/20080113132815/http://www.dominiquemainon.com/

Dominique Mainon (April 4, 1970 – January 25, 2012) was an American author, guerrilla artist, screenwriter and filmmaker living in Laguna Beach, California. Mainon also was noted as a transhumanist and futurist.

== Biography ==
=== Early life ===
Mainon was born to a British mother and a Texan father. She spent much of her childhood in the small village of Barripper in Cornwall, England, where she lived with her grandparents, attended PenPonds school, and first gained interest in the arts.

As a teenager, Mainon traveled Europe independently. She attended high school at the Gymnasium Juvenaat in Bergen Op Zoom in The Netherlands, where she learned to speak Dutch.

=== Career and health ===
Mainon was diagnosed with breast cancer in 2004. While enduring chemotherapy and radiation, she collaborated with James Ursini to write her first book, The Modern Amazons: Warrior Women On-Screen. In the introduction, she alludes to her experience while explaining the significance of the one-breasted amazon archetype.

In 2005, Mainon tracked down Aukai "Aqil" Collins in prison on a weapons charge for bounty hunting in Durango, Mexico. Collins was the author of the autobiography My Jihad. Hoping to make a film of his life story, and co-writing a sequel, Mainon began communicating with Collins on a regular basis. Collins was released from prison in May 2006. As Collins was on the no-fly list, FBI agents escorted him on a flight from El Paso to Orange County. Mainon hosted him for many months while he recovered from illness and malnourishment, after which Collins and Mainon began to work on a documentary about his experiences in Mexico and other countries called Have Gun, Will Travel.

Mainon's cancer came back in 2008, which led to a mastectomy and severe illness. Joined by many others in the longboard surfing community in Orange County, surfer Kerry Pedlow organized an 8-hour surf-a-thon to raise awareness and funds for Mainon. Several cast members of Bravo TV's reality series The Real Housewives of Orange County — including Jeana Keough, Vicki Gunvalson and Tammy Knickerbocker — threw a benefit to raise money for her medical expenses.

Once Mainon recovered, she began to work in the fashion industry. She produced behind-the-scenes films for brands such as Sasson, Seven and ReRock jeans, as well as Kitson LA, Rockstar Original and Elite Model's Fashion in collaboration with internationally recognized photographer Daniel Siboni of Innerspace Galleries.

In a radio interview with James Hughes, the executive director of the Institute for Ethics and Emerging Technologies, Mainon revealed that one of her latest books in progress was an extensive study and reference about the changing role of androids, robots and cyborgs in cinema and pop-culture. She was also cowriting a book with Scott Tapio titled Suburban Apocalypse: The Debasement of the American Dream in Cinema.

In 2011, Mainon's cancer recurred, and she became paralyzed. Mainon started a blog, 60 Days to Live?, to document her experience and address her mortality. On January 25, 2012, she died in a nursing home near her Joshua Tree home.

== Bibliography ==
- The Modern Amazons: Warrior Women On-Screen. 2006. Amadeus Press/Limelight Editions. ISBN 0879103272.
- Cinema of Obsession: Erotic Obsession and Love Gone Wrong in the Movies. 2007. Hal Leonard Press/Limelight Editions. ISBN 0879103477.
- The Femme Fatale: Cinema's Most Unforgettable Lethal Ladies. 2009. Hal Leonard Press/Limelight Editions. ISBN 0879103698.

Mainon contributed to:

- Gangster Film Reader. Edited by Alain Silver and James Ursini.
- Mae West: The Statue of Libido (Movie Icons Series). 2008. Edited by Paul Duncan. Taschen. ISBN 382282321X.
