= List of compositions by Aaron Copland =

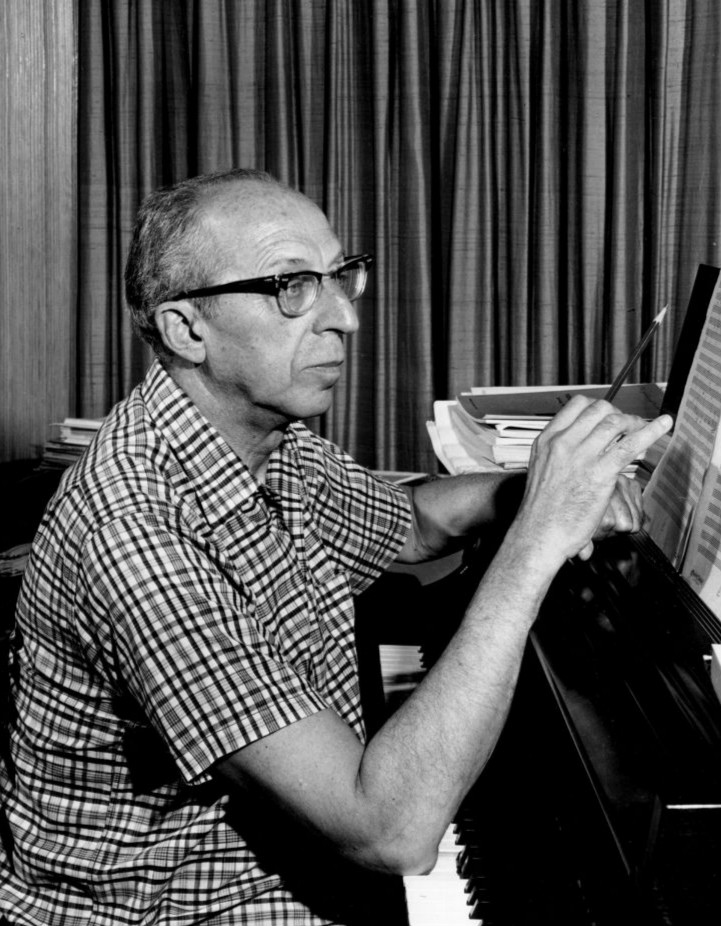
Aaron Copland in 1962

This is a list of compositions by Aaron Copland (1900–1990) in chronological order of composition:

== 1918–1919 ==
- Sonnet I for piano (1918)
- Sonnet II for piano (1919)

== 1920–1929 ==
- Old Poem for voice (1920)
- Sonnet III for piano (1920)
- The Cat and the Mouse for piano (1920)
- Pastorale for voice (1921)
- Honkytonk Blues (1921)
- Three Moods for piano (1921)
- Four Motets for mixed voices (1921)
  - Help us, O Lord
  - Sing ye Praises to our King
  - Have Mercy on us, O My Lord
  - Thou, O Jehovah, Abideth Forever
- Piano Sonata (No. 1) in G Major (1921)
- Petit Portrait for piano (1921)
- Alone for voice (1922)
- Passacaglia for piano (1922)
- Cortege Macabre for orchestra (1923)
- As It Fell Upon a Day for voice, flute, and clarinet (1923)
- Movement for String Quartet (1924)
- Symphony for organ and orchestra (1924)
- Grohg; ballet (1925, revised 1932)
- Music for the Theatre for orchestra (1925)
- Two Choruses ("The House on the Hill," "An Immortality") for chorus (1925)
- Piano Concerto for piano and orchestra (1926)
- Two Pieces for violin and piano (1926)
- Sentimental Melody for piano (1926)
- Four Piano Blues for piano (1926–48)
- Poet's Song for voice and piano (1927)
- Vocalise No.1 for voice (1928)
- Symphony No.1 for orchestra (1928)
- Two Pieces for String Quartet (1928)
- Two Pieces for String Orchestra (1928)
- Dance Symphony for orchestra (1929)
- Symphonic Ode for orchestra (1929, revised in 1955)
- Vitebsk: Study on a Jewish Theme for violin, violoncello, and piano (1929)
- Shall we gather by the river (1929)

== 1930–1939 ==
- Piano Variations (1930)
- Miracle at Verdun (1931)
- Elegies for violin and viola (1932), later partially used as "Subjective" for Statements
- Short Symphony for orchestra (1933)
- Love your neighbor as your self
- Statements for orchestra (1934)
- Into the Streets May First for chorus (1934)
- What Do We Plant? for chorus (1935)
- Sunday Afternoon Music for piano (1935)
- The Young Pioneers for piano (1935)
- Hear Ye! Hear Ye!; ballet (1935) [??]
- El Salón México for orchestra (1936)
- Sextet for clarinet, two violins, viola, violoncello, and piano (1937)
- The Second Hurricane; high school opera (1937)
- Prairie Journal, originally called Music for Radio for orchestra (1937)
- Waltz and Celebration for concert band (1938)
- Billy the Kid; ballet (1938)
- An Outdoor Overture for orchestra (1938)
- Lark for chorus (1938)
- The City; documentary film score (1939)
- Of Mice and Men; film score (1939)
- From Sorcery to Science; incidental music for puppet play (1939)

== 1940–1949 ==
- Quiet City; for trumpet, cor anglais, and string orchestra (1940)
- Our Town; film score (1940)
- John Henry for orchestra (1940, revised in 1952)
- Piano Sonata (No. 2, 1941)
- Episode for organ (1941)
- Arrangement of An Outdoor Overture for concert band (1941)
- Lincoln Portrait for narrator and orchestra (1942)
- Arrangement of Lincoln Portrait for concert band (1942)
- Rodeo; ballet (1942)
- Fanfare for the Common Man for brass and percussion (1942)
- Las Agachadas for chorus (1942)
- Music for Movies; for small orchestra (1942) ("New England Countryside" from The City, "Barley Wagons" from Of Mice and Men, "Sunday Traffic" from The City, "The Story of Grovers Corner" from Our Town, and "Threshing Machines" from Of Mice and Men)
- Danzón cubano for two pianos (1942)
- Song of the Guerillas for orchestra (1943); (piece with same title included in The North Star soundtrack)
- Sonata for Violin (or Clarinet) and Piano (1943)
- The North Star; soundtrack (1943)
- Appalachian Spring; ballet (1944)
- Arrangement of Appalachian Spring for orchestra (1944)
- Letter from Home for orchestra (1944, revised in 1962)
- Midday Thoughts for piano (1944/82)
- Jubilee Variations for orchestra (1945)
- The Cummington Story; short film score (1945)
- Symphony No. 3 for orchestra (1946)
- Arrangement of Danzón cubano for orchestra (1946)
- In the Beginning for mezzo-soprano and chorus (1947)
- Midsummer Nocturne for piano (1947/77)
- The Red Pony; film score (1948)
- Clarinet Concerto for clarinet and string orchestra with harp and piano (1948)
- The Heiress; film score (1949)
- Preamble for a Solemn Occasion for orchestra (1949)

== 1950–1959 ==
- Quartet for violin, viola, violoncello, and piano (1950)
- Twelve Poems of Emily Dickinson for medium voice and piano (1950)
  1. Nature, the gentlest mother
  2. There came a wind like a bugle
  3. Why do they shut me out of Heaven
  4. The world feels dusty
  5. Heart, we will forget him
  6. Dear March, come in!
  7. Sleep is supposed to be
  8. When they come back
  9. I felt a funeral in my brain
  10. I've heard an organ talk sometimes
  11. Going to Heaven!
  12. The Chariot.
- Old American Songs First set for voice and piano (also adapted for voice and orchestra) (1950)
  1. The Boatmen's Dance (minstrel song from 1843)
  2. The Dodger (campaign song)
  3. Long Time Ago (ballad)
  4. Simple Gifts (Shaker song)
  5. I Bought Me a Cat (children's song)
- Old American Songs Second set for voice and piano (also adapted for voice and orchestra) (1952)
  1. The Little Horses (lullaby)
  2. Zion’s Walls (revivalist song)
  3. The Golden Willow Tree (Anglo-American ballad)
  4. At the River (hymn tune)
  5. Ching-A-Ring Chaw (minstrel song)
- Arrangement of Preamble for a Solemn Occasion for organ (1953)
- Dirge in the Woods for voice and piano (1954)
- The Tender Land; opera (1954)
- Canticle of Freedom for chorus and orchestra (1955)
- Variations on a Shaker Melody for concert band (1956)
- Fantasy for piano (1955–57)
- Orchestral Variations (arrangement of Piano Variations) for orchestra (1957)
- Arrangement of The Tender Land for orchestra (The Tender Land Suite) (1957)
- The World of Nick Adams; soundtrack (1957)
- Dance Panels, ballet (1959, revised in 1962)

== 1960–1969 ==
- Nonet for 3 violins, 3 violas, and 3 cellos (1960)
- Something Wild; soundtrack (1960)
- Connotations for orchestra (1961–62)
- Down a Country Lane for piano (1962)
- Danza de Jalisco (in Latin American Sketches) for two pianos (1963)
- Arrangement of Down a Country Lane for orchestra (1964)
- Emblems for concert band (1964); orchestral transcription D. Wilson Ochoa (2006)
- Music for a Great City for orchestra (1964)
- In Evening Air for piano (1966)
- Signature: C B S Playhouse [TV theme] for orchestra (1966)
- Inscape for orchestra (1967)
- Arrangement of Variations on a Shaker Melody for orchestra (1967)
- Inaugural Fanfare for concert band (1969, revised in 1975)
- Happy Anniversary for orchestra (1969)

== 1970–1990 ==
- Eight Poems of Emily Dickinson (1958–70) (orchestral arrangement of part of Twelve Poems of Emily Dickinson)
- Duo for Flute and Piano (1967/71)
- Threnody No.1: In Memoriam Igor Stravinsky for flute, violin, viola, and cello (1971)
- Three Latin American Sketches for orchestra (1972)
- Night Thoughts: Homage to Ives for piano (1972)
- Threnody No.2: In Memoriam Beatrice Cunningham for flute, violin, viola, and cello (1973)
- Midday Thoughts for piano (1944/82)
- Proclamation for piano (1973/82)
- Proclamation for orchestra (orchestrated 1985 by Phillip Ramey)
