= Connotations (Copland) =

Classical music composition by Aaron Copland

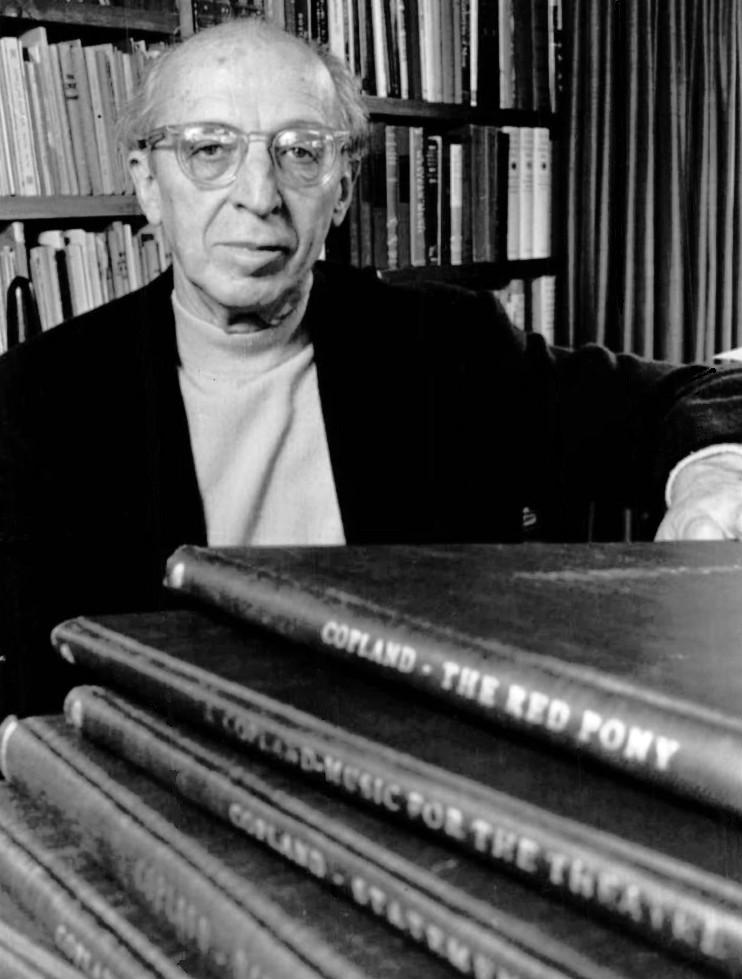
Aaron Copland as the subject of a Young People's Concert, 1970

Connotations is a classical music composition for symphony orchestra written by American composer Aaron Copland. Commissioned by Leonard Bernstein in 1962 to commemorate the opening of Philharmonic Hall (now David Geffen Hall at Lincoln Center for the Performing Arts) in New York City, United States, this piece marks a departure from Copland's populist period, which began with El Salón México in 1936 and includes the works he is most famous for such as Appalachian Spring, Lincoln Portrait and Rodeo. It represents a return to a more dissonant style of composition in which Copland wrote from the end of his studies with French pedagogue Nadia Boulanger and return from Europe in 1924 until the Great Depression. It was also Copland's first dodecaphonic work for orchestra, a style he had disparaged until he heard the music of French composer Pierre Boulez and adapted the method for himself in his Piano Quartet of 1950. While the composer had produced other orchestral works contemporary to Connotations, it was his first purely symphonic work since his Third Symphony, written in 1947.

Connotations was received negatively upon its premiere for its harmonic assertiveness and compositional style. The overall impression at the time was that, as critic Alex Ross later phrased it, "Copland was no longer in an ingratiating mood." The composer was accused by some critics of betraying his role as a tonal, populist composer to curry favor with younger composers and give the impression that his music still held contemporary relevance. Copland denied this accusation; he asserted that he had written Connotations as a twelve-tone work to give himself compositional options not available had he written it as a tonal one.

Part of the blame for Connotations' initial failure has been ascribed by Copland biographer Howard Pollack, among others, to Bernstein's "harsh and overblown" conducting. Bernstein, known in the classical music community as a long-time champion of Copland's music, had programmed the composer's pieces more frequently with the New York Philharmonic than those of any other living composer. However, these performances were mainly of works from the composer's populist period, with which the conductor was in full sympathy. He was less comfortable in pieces that were atonal or rhythmically disjunctive. While Bernstein might have performed the work purely out of service to an old friend, he was apparently unable to interpret this work persuasively. Subsequent performances with New York Philharmonic during its 1963 European tour and a 1999 all-Copland concert showed that the situation had not changed. Bad acoustics might have also played a part in the work's lack of success at its premiere.

More recent performances, led by conductors Pierre Boulez, Edo de Waart and Sixten Ehrling, have been acknowledged to show the music in a more positive light. Nevertheless, the overall reputation of the music remains mixed. Some critics, including composer John Adams, have remained critical of the work and considered Copland's use of serial techniques detrimental to his later music. Others, which include critics Michael Andrews and Peter Davis, have seen Connotations as proof of Copland's continued growth and inventiveness as a composer while not downplaying the work's melodic and harmonic harshness and potential difficulty overall for listeners.

== Background ==
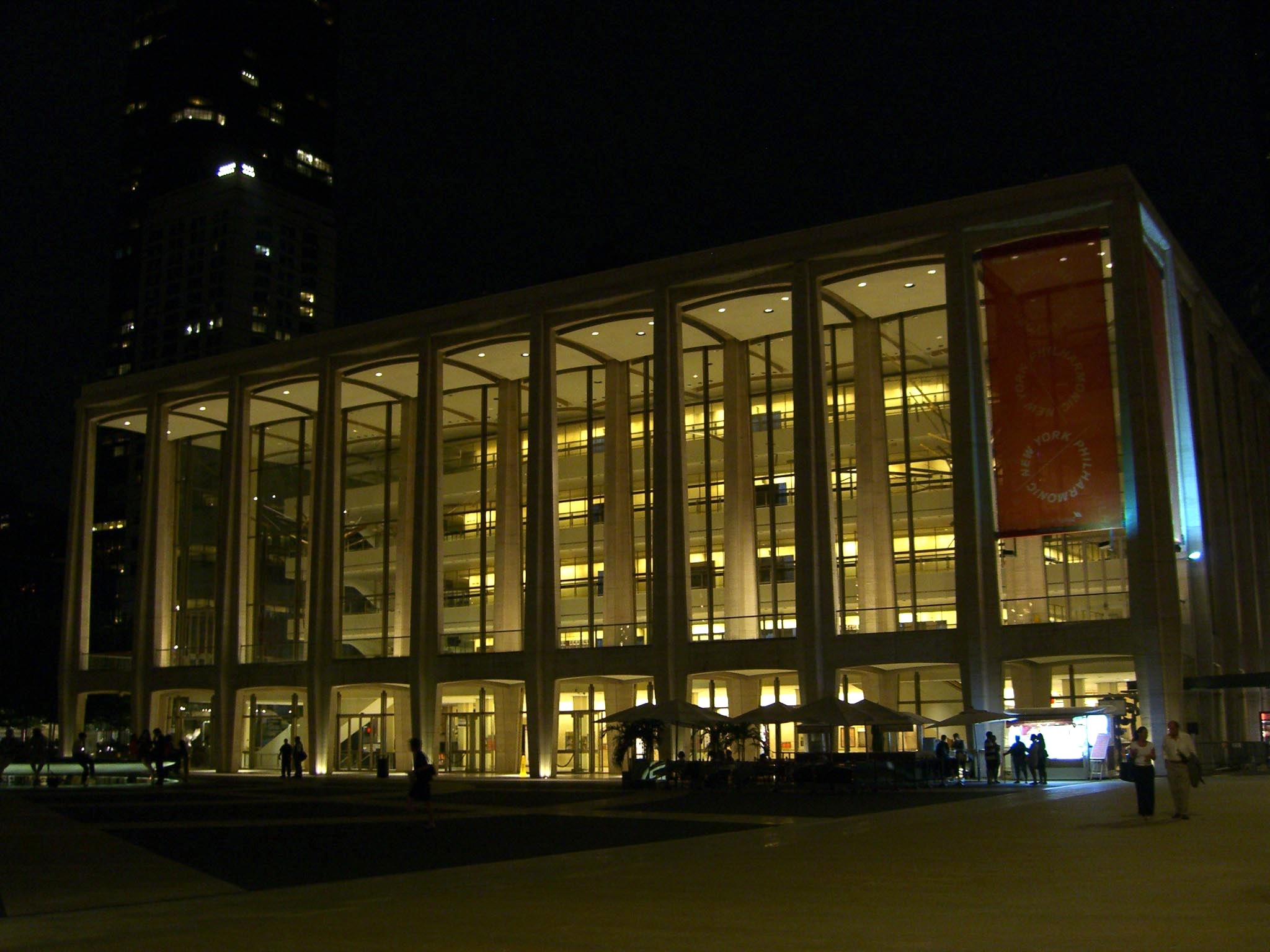
The Philharmonic Hall in Lincoln Center, for the opening of which Connotations was commissioned.

Aaron Copland wrote Connotations to fulfill a commission from Leonard Bernstein for the opening concert of the New York Philharmonic's new home in the Lincoln Center for the Performing Arts. Since this hall was slated as the first part of Lincoln Center for completion, its inauguration was considered especially momentous. Among the guest list of 2600 for the first concert and the white-tie gala which would follow it were John D. Rockefeller III (chairman of Lincoln Center), Secretary of State Dean Rusk, Governor and Mrs. Nelson Rockefeller, United Nations Secretary General U Thant and prominent figures in the arts that included of Metropolitan Opera General Manager Rudolf Bing, violinist Isaac Stern and actress Merle Oberon. Noted composers would also attend included Samuel Barber, Henry Cowell, Roy Harris, Walter Piston, Richard Rodgers, William Schuman and Roger Sessions. United States president John F. Kennedy and his wife Jackie had also been invited. Their initial inability to attend caused some consternation, since they had voiced their support for American culture. At the last minute, Jackie Kennedy said she would be there.

Copland was one of ten internationally known composers who accepted invitations to contribute music for the opening. His would be the first new piece to be heard. Other compositions included the Eighth Symphony of American composer William Schuman, an Overture Philharmonique by French composer Darius Milhaud and "Andromache's Farewell" for soprano and orchestra by American composer Samuel Barber. It would also be Copland's first purely symphonic piece since his Third Symphony of 1947, although he had penned orchestral works in a number of genres throughout the 1940s and 50s. According to Taruskin, Copland's receipt of such a commission testified to both his status as a creative figure and his close relationship with the American public. This position was unique among "serious" American composers and derived from the populist works he had written in the 1930s and 40s. However, from the 1950s Copland's public works—the ones for which he had developed his populist style—were increasingly written in what he called his "difficult" or "private" style. That style had become increasingly non-tonal.

Copland began sketching the work early in 1961. To gain composing time, he cancelled his 1962 trip to Tanglewood and determined to stay at home the entire year. Even so, he accepted an invitation to revisit Japan early in 1962 for a United States State Department conference and combined the trip with conducting engagements in Seattle and Vancouver. By June 25, Copland wrote to Mexican composer Carlos Chavez, "I am working day and night on my symphony for the Philharmonic commission. It is in three movements and I have just finished the last, the first being more than half done." Copland then went to Mexico at Chavez's invitation, partly to conduct but mainly to compose. From there, he wrote American composer Leo Smit on July 4 that he was not yet finished and was having trouble finding a title for the new work. He completed the piece in September 1962, just in time for orchestra rehearsals.

When he considered the form the work would take, Copland wrote that he "concluded that the classical masters would undoubtedly provide the festive and dedicatory tone appropriate to such an occasion." He therefore decided to offer "a contemporary note," one that would reflect "the tensions, aspirations and drama inherent in the world today." This tension, he explained in 1975, "is inherent in the nature of the chordal structures, and in the general character of the piece."

== Composition ==
=== Instrumentation ===
Connotations is scored for full symphony orchestra with augmented percussion. The complete ensemble includes piccolo, three flutes (third flute doubling second piccolo), two oboes, cor anglais, two clarinets, E-flat clarinet, bass clarinet, three bassoons (third bassoon doubling contrabassoon), six horns, four trumpets, four trombones, tuba, tympani, five percussionists (glockenspiel, vibraphone, xylophone, conga drums, timbales, cymbals, metal sheet, tam-tam, triangle, claves, temple block, woodblock, bass drum, snare drum, tenor drum), piano (doubling celesta) and strings.

=== Form ===
A typical performance of this work lasts 20 minutes.

Connotations is twelve-tone, a style of composition which is among the first introduced, and certainly most well known, forms of musical Serialism. Through this technique, Copland wrote that he felt he could express "something of the tensions, aspirations and drama" of that time. Three four-note chords, musicologist Neil Butterworth writes, spell out the 12-note row on two trumpets and two trombones. Each chord is separated by echoes from the remaining trumpets and trombones, which also introduces one of the work's main rhythmic elements. The row is repeated, transposed up an augmented fourth with a different distribution of notes within each chord. The chords "are repeated several times in various transpositions" so they can become firmly established in both the musical fabric and the listener's ear.

From these chords, Copland builds an overall structure that he calls "closest to a free treatment of the baroque form of the chaconne," with a succession of variations "based on the opening chords and their implied melodic intervals." A series of variations alternate fast and slow sections, which according to Copland biographer Howard Pollack creates a complex structure overall. This structure forms a musical arch, sectioned ABCBA. Pollack calls the A sections "prophetic, tragic," the B sections "jazzy, frentic [sic]" and the C section "pastoral, reflective." While these are all moods long familiar to listeners of Copland's music, Pollack asserts, "a new darkness hangs over the whole. The outer sections are grave; the jazzy sections rather cheerless; the pastoral contrast more weary than peaceful. The music often seems lost, uncertain, trapped." The piece ends in a series of strict 12-note chords that Copland called "aggregates."

=== Significance of title ===
Both Chavez and American composer David Diamond were confused initially about what musical form Connotations would take. The work's title seemed to give no clear indication, they said, and Chavez told Copland that he found Connotations too abstract. As Copland explained to both men and later wrote, in selecting the title, he took the dictionary meaning of the word "connote" to imply or signify meanings in addition to the primary one as an impetus for musical exploration.

Butterworth writes, "Connotations is an essay in contrasts that do not destroy the inherent unity: the chordal writing gives way to outbursts of complex counterpoint." The entire composition, Copland explains, is derived from the "three harsh chords" with which it begins. Each of these chords contained four notes of the twelve-note row upon which the work is based. "When spelled out horizontally," they supplied him "with various versions of a more lyrical discourse." This "skeletal frame of the row," he told Diamond and Chavez, was the "primary meaning" and as such denoted the area which would be explored in the course of the piece. "The subsequent treatment," he explained, "seeks out other implications—connotations that come in a flash or connotations that the composer himself may gradually uncover." From there, the listener was "free to discover his or her own connotative meanings, including perhaps some not suspected by the author.

=== Resemblance to other Copland works ===
Overall, both Pollack and the composer label Connotations as one of three works written in "the grand manner," as Copland wrote about his Third Symphony. The other two works in this category were the Symphonic Ode and the Third Symphony. Copland also calls those works transitional pieces, anomalies which stand between different compositional styles of his oeuvre. All three works proved, as musicologist William W. Austin notes and Pollack states about the symphony, "challenging to grasp." While music historian Judith Tick notes the work's "massive chordal assaults on the ear," she adds that while Copland 's stated intent was to evoke the dissonance of modern life, he also acknowledges "the darkness revealed in such early works from the 1920s as the Symphonic Ode and Piano Variations."

As for details, Pollack elaborates in his biography of the composer about the similarity of Connotations to the Ode in its overall length, single-movement form, solemn tone and "hard-edged" orchestration. Butterworth points out that both works are structured as an arch composed of five sections. The first section, slow and chordal, gives way to a scherzo. The third section is slower, followed by another scherzo and a finale which restates passages taken from the opening. The rhythmic patterns in both pieces resemblance each other. This would have been no surprise, Butterworth writes, since Copland revised that score in 1955. Pollock states that another work that might have been fresh on the composer's mind was his Nonet for strings, composed in 1960, which also employs an arch form.

The melodic lines' wide leaps and arpeggios are not far removed from those in the Short Symphony, written 30 years earlier, and the prevalence of the interval of the minor ninth hearkens back to his Orchestral Variations, as does his use of alternating fast and slow sections.

== Reception ==
The premiere, on September 23, 1962, "sent shock waves through the world of music," according to Alexander J. Morin, with a reaction by the initial audience, according to Taruskin, of near-silence and incomprehension. Copland noted that the general impression "was that the premiere was not a congenial circumstance," with the music not considered important as the sound of the new concert hall. His effort to present something not bland or traditional for such an occasion and distinguished audience "was not appreciated at the time." Also, Taruskin states, Copland had become an emblem of success in the eyes of the American public. The fact he had written a twelve-tone composition for such an occasion seemed a repudiation of the audience he had won through years of hard effort.

=== Public ===
The overall impression, as critic Alex Ross writes in his book The Rest is Noise, was that "Copland was no longer in an ingratiating mood; some sudden rage welled up in him, some urge to confront the gala Lincoln Center audience with an old whiff of revolutionary mystique." Copland himself remembers, "The acidulous harmonies of my score ... upset a good many people, especially those who were expecting another Appalachian Spring." Jacqueline Kennedy was left unable to say anything other than "Oh, Mr. Copland" when taken backstage during intermission to meet with the composer. When Copland later asked Verna Fine, wife of American composer Irving Fine, what this meant, Fine answered, "Oh, Aaron, it's obvious. She hated your piece!" In Variety, Robert J. Landry called Connotations "an assault on [the audience's] nervous systems" and added, "Seldom has this reviewer heard such outspoken comment in the lobbies after such dull response. It is strictly accurate to declare that an audience paying $100 a seat and in mood for self-congratulation and schmaltz hated Copland's reminder of the ugly realities of industrialization, inflation and cold war—which his music seems to be talking about."

A minority of apparently more discerning listeners felt that Connotations was the right music for its time and place. Composer Arthur Berger states, "I think [Copland] wrote exactly the piece he wanted to write because he wanted to make a statement about the new Philharmonic Hall in New York—it wasn't going to be a temple of easy listening, as it were, but a place for serious music-making." Minna Lederman Daniel, a music writer and editor of Modern Music magazine, told Copland, "I think Connotations was the right place for the people and the occasion—indeed the only one properly related to them. It sounds a good deal like certain aspects of the building—big, spacious, clear, long-lined, and it sounds very like you ... To those familiar with your music, the characteristic, identifying moods are perfectly apparent. The special Copland eloquence is there."

=== Critics ===
A few critics were positive. Louis Biancolli wrote in The New York Telegram that the work was "a turning point in [Copland's] career, a powerful score in 12-tone style that has liberated new stores of creative energy." John Molleson write for the New York Herald Tribune that while the new piece was "a difficult work and like most music difficult to understand at one hearing ... this piece has flesh where others have only skin, and there was a good deal of arresting lyricism." Others, however, dismissed Connotations: Everett Helm thought it "unnecessarily strident," Harriet Johnson "too long for its content" and Richard Franko Johnson "completely without charm."

=== Telecast ===
The concert was telecast live by the National Broadcasting Company (NBC) to an audience of 26 million viewers. As part of its program, NBC asked Copland to talk to the television audience about Connotations. While the cameras alternated between shots of the composer and the manuscript score, Copland said, "It seems to me that there are two things you can do when listening to any new work. The most important thing is to lend yourself—or to put it another way—try to be as sensitive as you can to the overall feeling the new piece gives off. The second way is to listen with some awareness of the general shape of the new piece, realizing that a composer works with his musical materials just as an architect works with his building materials in order to construct an edifice that makes sense." He then discussed the work briefly but in some detail.

To Copland's surprise, his lecture was taken as an apologia, not an explanation, by the majority of the television audience. Moreover, vehement letters poured into NBC after the broadcast from across the United States. One read, "If last night is any criterion of what can be expected in Lincoln Center, it should be called 'Center of Jungle Culture.'" Another read, "Dear Mr. Copland, Shame Shame Shame!"

=== European tour and first recording ===
Bernstein conducted Connotations again during the first week of regular philharmonic concerts in 1963 and included it among the pieces the orchestra played on its European tour that February. Despite the composer's claim in Copland Since 1943 that "The European premiere was more successful than the New York reception," reviews about Connotations remained mainly negative; comments abounded about "mere din" and "dodecaphonic deserts." When the London audience gave the work a lengthy ovation, Bernstein responded that he would conduct another Copland work as an encore. When cries of "Oh, oh" ensued, he added, "But this will be in a different style." He then conducted "Hoe-Down" from the ballet Rodeo.

A release of the New York performance by Columbia Records fared no better. Robert Marsh found the music "dreary" and "dull." Irving Kolodin called it "rather relentlessly grim." Everett Helm, who had been able to hear the work live before he sampled the recording, wrote, "Connotations for Orchestra sounded rather strident on September 23; on the disc it becomes ear-piercing." Bernstein rerecorded Connotations with the New York Philharmonic for Columbia in 1973. This recording was released with Copland's Inscape and Carter's Concerto for Orchestra.

=== Other factors in initial failure ===
The composer admitted that Connotations possessed "a rather severe and somewhat intellectual tone." However, while he did not expect it to be an immediate success, he had still hoped that the music's intensity and drama might lend it some appeal. While Copland maintained that "It bothers me not at all to realize that my range as a composer includes both accessible and problematic works," composer and musicologist Peter Dickinson notes "a tone of defensiveness" in this remark. Nevertheless, Connotations' abrasiveness to many listeners might not have been the only factor in its initial failure.

==== Bernstein ====
The negative initial reaction to Connotations has also been claimed to have been due to Bernstein's conducting. Bernstein was especially antipathetic toward works that were atonal or rhythmically disjunctive and "could not overcome a deep-seated antipathy, an almost gut reaction" against them. Of the contemporary composers with whom he could relate, he had been "generous and enthusiastic" in his support of Copland. His frequent programming of Copland's works during his tenure with the New York Philharmonic might, Adams suggests, have been partly in reaction against works of the twelve-tone school. Now he was confronted with what American composer John Adams terms a "stridently dissonant, piss-n-vinegar" work "written in an idiom so alien to his own sensibilities," the first performance of which he would not only conduct but would also be televised to a national audience. Pollack claims Bernstein might have found Connotations "boring" and kept it on the program solely out of duty to his old friend.

Despite Bernstein's own musical antipathies, Adams claims the conductor generally remained open-minded and curious enough "to try something at least once." Among the world premieres of "difficult" works he led were Olivier Messiaen's Turangalîla-Symphonie in Boston in 1949 and Carter's Concerto for Orchestra in New York in 1970; and despite his apparent lack of identification with Carter's music, he described the composer in 1975 as "a brilliant mind and a supremely intelligent musician." Bernstein conducted Connotations again during the first week of regular philharmonic concerts in 1963 and included it among the pieces the orchestra played on its European tour in February 1963. He would also commission a subsequent orchestral work from Copland, which became Inscape, and conduct Connotations again in an all-Copland concert with the New York Philharmonic in 1989. Even with this advocacy and the chance to familiarize himself at length, Connotations apparently remained a work that Bernstein did not conduct well. Critic Peter Davis, in his review of the 1989 performance, writes that while Connotations remained "admittedly not a very lovable piece," in Bernstein's hands it "sounded more fulsome than portentous."

==== Acoustical problems with Philharmonic Hall ====
Copland acknowledged that the acoustics at the premiere were "shrill." While Philharmonic Hall was being renovated in 1976 in an attempt to improve its sound, Harold C. Schonberg wrote, "For all we know, Connotations is a masterpiece. But one thing is certain—it did not make many friends for Lincoln Center in 1962." While admitting the work was "written in Copland's austere, objective, abstract style," he suggested that bad acoustics might have also played a part in the work's failure at the premiere. The orchestra that night had been augmented by a large chorus to perform the first movement of Gustav Mahler's Eighth Symphony, which pushed the orchestra forward, "out of its normal playing position ... The sound was bad, bad. The bass response was sorely deficient, the hall was plagued with echoes, the musicians on stage reported that they could not hear each other very well (just great for ensemble) and in general Philharmonic Hall sounded like a cheap hi-fi set with the bass speakers out of the circuit.

=== Composer efforts ===
Copland conducted Connotations in 1966, 1967 and 1968 around the United States. This included an engagement at the Musica Viva series in San Francisco and concerts with the Baltimore Symphony Orchestra, the National Symphony Orchestra in Washington D.C. and the Buffalo Philharmonic Orchestra. "I spoke to the audiences," Copland writes, "with humorous accounts of the work's adverse effect on droves of letter writers, who had heard the original performance, in person or on TV. Then I asked the brass section to illustrate the opening chords, and the strings how they sounded. Before they knew it, the audience was sympathetic. My purpose was not to sell the work but to demonstrate it."

=== Boulez revival ===
A decade after Bernstein premiered the work, Pierre Boulez, who had succeeded Bernstein as music director of the New York Philharmonic in 1971, conducted Connotations with the orchestra for the ten-year anniversary of Philharmonic Hall (subsequently renamed Avery Fisher Hall; later David Geffen Hall). According to Copland, ten years had allowed enough time to change audience perceptions for the better. In his review for The New York Times Harold C. Schonberg wrote that this time, the audience "did not rise in revolt" as it had in 1962. He added, "The composer's cause was helped by, if memory serves, a better performance than had been given in 1962. Mr. Boulez revels in this kind of music, and he brought drama to it as well as a synthesizing quality."

== Analysis ==
Connotations was the first orchestral work in which Copland used serial principles of composition. Serial or twelve-tone music, Copland stated, carried "a built-in tenseness ... a certain drama ... a sense of strain or tension" inherent in its extended use of chromaticism. "These are new tensions," he continued, "different from what I would have dreamt up if I had been thinking tonally." To composer John Adams, Copland's embrace of serial technique was not really such a stretch "because ever since the 1920s, he'd already a piss-'n-vinegar penchant for sour intervals, like he did in the Piano Variations." Contrary to the charge that would be made after Connotations' premiere that Copland wrote a twelve-tone work to impress younger composers, he had actually begun using the method at a time when few other American composers were doing so. While Copland's first expressly serial works were his Piano Quartet of 1950 and Piano Fantasy and he noted that some critics (whom he did not name) had traced a similarity in those pieces to his Piano Variations of 1930, he claimed in his 1967 "conversation" with Edward T. Cone that the Variations were "the start of my interest in serial writing ... Although it doesn't use all twelve tones, it does use seven of them in what I hope is a consistently logical way." Prior to that interview, few had related Copland's early work to that of the founder of twelve-tone composition, Arnold Schoenberg.

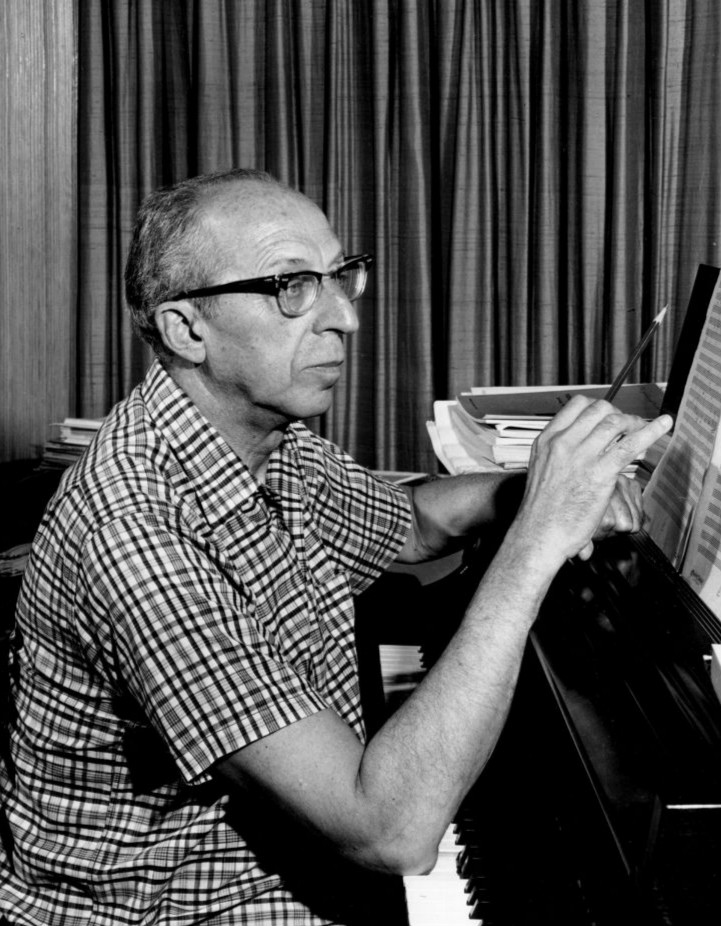
Copland in 1962.

By the time he wrote Connotations, Copland had come to the view that serial composition was "like looking at a picture from a different point of view" and used it "with the hope that it would freshen and enrich my [compositional] technique." Part of that changed viewpoint, Copland said, "was that I began to hear chords that I wouldn't have heard otherwise. Heretofore, I had been thinking tonally, but this was a new way of moving tones about." Serialism also allowed Copland a synthesis of serial and non-serial practices that had long concerned Copland and he had previously felt impossible to attain. One challenge Copland said he faced while he composed Connotations was "to construct an overall line that had continuity, dramatic force and an inherent unity." He stated that he had faced a similar challenge in his Orchestral Variations (his orchestration of the Piano Variations). He added that while dodecaphonic techniques supplied "the building blocks" for Connotations, it was up to him to supply "the edifice" that these blocks would eventually form.

Critic Paul Henry Lang, among others, lamented Copland's "yield to the conformism of 12-tone music." As serial and serial-inspired music was considered more academically viable than music utilizing common practice tonality (especially in Europe), some contemporary critics felt that Copland was trying to retain his place at the apex of the American classical music scene by conforming to "academic standards." Taruskin suggests that it might have appeared to these critics that Copland "had sacrificed his hard-won, well-nigh unique public appeal for what seemed ... an 'alienated' modernist stance." As the composer had been one of the first American composers to import the style from Europe—in the mid twenties—these critics may have overlooked the possibility that his "populist period" may have represented the more jarring deviation in his compositional style.

It had also been some time since a Copland piece had been appreciated widely by audiences. His opera The Tender Land had not fared well, either in its original or revised forms. Choreographer Jerome Robbins never produced Copland's ballet Dance Panels, despite the fact that he had commissioned it. None of his major orchestral works from the 1960s—Connotations, Music for a Great City, Emblems and Inscape—made much of an impact with audiences. Nor do they fit in either the populist or modernist parts of Copland's compositional output. Copland was aware that dodecaphonism did not hold as high a place as it had previously and writes, "By the sixties, serialism had been around for over fifty years; young composers were not so fascinated with it anymore." Nonetheless, he did not want to be pigeonholed. He told American composer Walter Piston in 1963, "People always want to shove me into the American idea more than I really want. Nobody wants to be an 'American' composer now as they did." He told another friend, "Young composers today wouldn't be caught dead with a folk tune!" He heard a considerable amount of new music through his association with Tanglewood and might not have wanted to be left behind. At the same time, he might not have become totally at home with serialism. He confided to Verna Fine, "I don't feel comfortable with the twelve-tone system, but I don't want to keep repeating myself."

== Ballet ==
Choreographer John Neumier, noted for his ballets based on literary themes, received permission from Copland to use music from Connotations, the Piano Variations and Piano Fantasy for a ballet, The Fall Hamlet (The Hamlet Affair). Staged by the American Ballet Theatre on January 6, 1976, the title role was danced by Mikhail Barishnikov, Ophelia by Gelsie Kirkland, Gertrude by Marcia Haydée and Claudius by Erik Bruhn. The ballet was received poorly, due to ineffective choreography. Critic Bob Micklin noted, however, that Copland's "prickly, restless music" reflected the ballet's story very well.

== Legacy ==
Despite its initial reception, Connotations was listed in 1979 by Billboard magazine among Copland works that continued to be programmed by orchestras, with subsequent performances by Pierre Boulez, Edo de Waart and Sixten Ehrling received positively. Reaction to the work itself remains mixed. Ross dismisses Connotations as a "barbaric yawp of a piece." Morin calls it a "thorny, riveting patchwork" and listening to it "like the unrelenting pummeling of a prizefighter at times." Adams calls its style "very simplistic ... strident" and "generally unpleasant sounding" and adds that "the rigor [of twelve-tone composition] seemed more to cramp [Copland's] natural spontaneity than to aid it." Composer Kyle Gann calls Connotations "big, unwieldy ... and [not] that good ... Copland's imagination seemed constrained by the technique. On a more positive note, Davis wrote after a performance of the work under Ehrling by The Juilliard Orchestra that while Connotations remains a "spiky" composition, Copland "adopts Schoenberg's serial procedures to produce a sequence of typically pungent and exhilarating Coplandesque sonorities." Desmond Shawe-Taylor called the work "beautifully put together: full of energy, variety, thought" after he had heard Boulez conduct the piece. Michael Andrews wrote of Copland's "mammoth, anxious and angry vision" and Barlett Naylor of "a majesty hidden in this dark piece" after both had heard de Waart's performance.

== Recordings ==
Along with Bernstein's two performances, Copland recorded Connotations with the Orchestre National de France (no longer available). More recently, The Juilliard Orchestra recorded the work under the direction of Sixten Ehrling for New World Records.
