= Danzón cubano =

1942 piano composition by American composer Aaron Copland

- by Aaron Copland
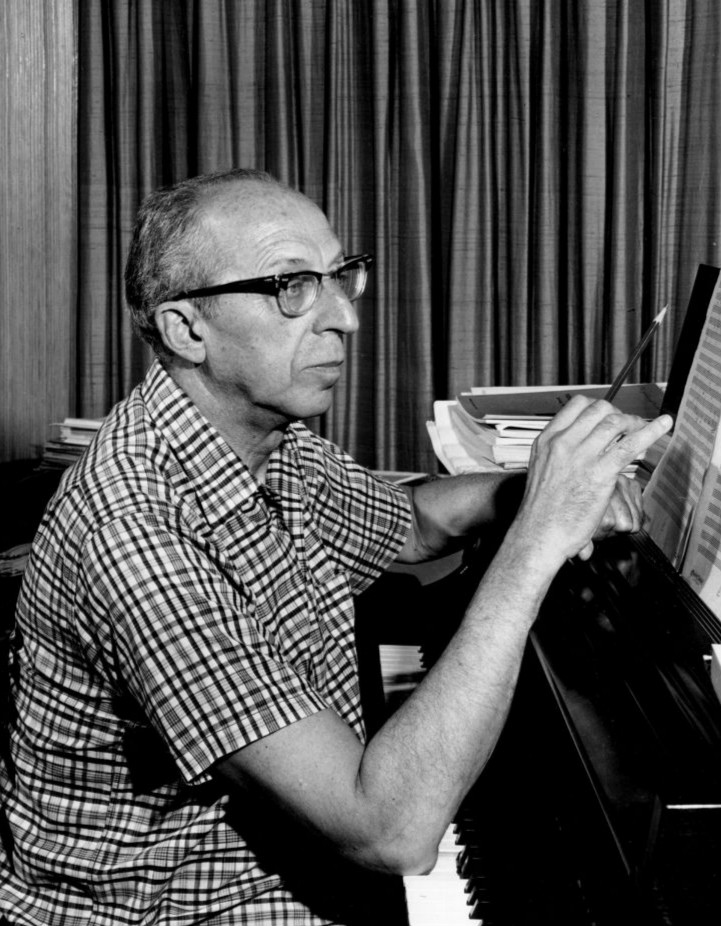
- Aaron Copland in 1962
- Form: Danzón
- Composed: 1942 – 1942: Oakland
- Performed: 9 December 1942: New York
- Published: 1943:
- Scoring: Two pianos

Danzón cubano is a composition for two pianos by American composer Aaron Copland. The piece, written in 1942, was inspired by the Cuban genre of the same name. It was first arranged for orchestra in 1946.

== Composition ==
After having premiered El Salon Mexico in Mexico City in 1937, Copland traveled to Havana and other Latin American countries to study their rhythms and musical forms, with which he had a fascination. During this trip, he finished his second book, Our New Music, together with his lover, Victor Kraft. Four months after that, in 1941, he became a representative of the Committee of Inter-American Relations and went on a tour which took him four months to complete and traveled around nine different countries. He spent the time during this trip giving lectures and concerts after returning once again to Havana, which he considered to be a special place to him.

This trip to Havana led him to write two pieces: Las agachadas, a choral work, and the Danzón cubano, for two pianos. He completed the latter while he was in Oakland, in the fall of 1942. However, it was largely based on themes, melodies and rhythms that Copland himself either heard or recorded during his stay in Cuba. As Copland himself explained: "The Danzón cubano is in no sense intended to be an authentic danzón, but only an American tourist's impression". It was written to celebrate the twentieth anniversary of the League of Composers, in a concert entitled Salute to the League of Composers, which was held at New York's Town Hall on December 9, 1942. Copland, however, entitled the work Birthday Piece as a reference not only to the League's anniversary, but also to Rudy Burckhardt's birthday. The composer premiered this work together with Leonard Bernstein on this occasion and dedicated it to Rudy Burckhardt, who was a friend of Copland and his lover who accompanied them while on their trip to Havana. The score was published shortly after the premiere by Boosey & Hawkes in 1943.

The Danzón was later expanded for a large orchestra in 1946. It was premiered by the Baltimore Symphony Orchestra on February 17, 1946, Reginald Stewart conducting. However, Copland revisited the piece many times during his professional career. Since then, it has been performed by many of the most important orchestras in the United States, such as the Cleveland Orchestra and the Los Angeles Symphonic Orchestra. The orchestral score was published again shortly after by Boosey & Hawkes in 1947. It was later compiled in an orchestral anthology of Copland's works, together with Quiet City, Lincoln Portrait, the Clarinet Concerto, and Three Latin-American Sketches.

Eliot Feld also choreographed the work as a ballet under the same name, for three female dancers and one male dancer. After watching a televised rehearsal of the ballet, Copland asked Feld if he had even been to Cuba, to which Feld responded that he had never been to Cuba but had felt as if he had been there upon having listened to his piece.

One of the last performances that Copland gave was in a concert by American fellow musician and Principal Pianist at the New York Philharmonic Paul Jacobs on December 15, 1979. In the concert, Jacobs discussed the influence of jazz in modern classical music, as he performed pieces by Frederic Rzewski, William Bolcom and Copland's own Four Piano Blues. After having been able to convince Copland to come up the stage, they both played the Danzón, even though Copland confessed to have been a little nervous about playing the piano again after a hiatus of more than 10 years. As Copland said: "Paul's an old friend and he talked me into it". The piece was recorded and the concert was partially released by Nonesuch Records.

== Structure ==
The piece is scored for two pianos and should not take much more than 7 minutes to perform. The score is marked Moderately [quarter note = 88], with the additional parenthetical remark "(nonchalant but precise)"; in fact, the orchestral version is usually performed a bit slower due to specific demands made by Copland in its time, given the difficulty and the expected preciseness of the different rhythms. As stated by Copland, the danzón is not to be confused with rhumba, conga, or samba, but rather a bit slower dance. It is usually divided into two thematic parts which are mutually independent, but with a highly syncopated style. However, in this piece, Copland used up to four different themes.

The orchestral arrangement of the Danzón is scored for a piccolo, two flutes, two oboes, a cor anglais, two clarinets in B♭, one bass clarinet in B♭, two bassoons, one contrabassoon, four horns in F, three trumpets in B♭, three trombones, a tuba, timpani, a xylophone, a large percussion section consisting of a bass drum, Chinese blocks, claves, a cowbell, cymbals, a gourd, maracas, a slapstick, a snare drum, and a woodblock, a piano and a large string section.
