= Live! (Frederica von Stade album) =

Frederica von Stade Live!
- CBS Masterworks LP, IM-37231

Live album by Frederica von Stade
- Released: 1982
- Venues: Alice Tully Hall, New York City
- Genre: Classical vocal
- Length: 46:37
- Languages: Italian, French, Occitan and English
- Label: CBS Masterworks
- Producer: David Mottley

Frederica von Stade Live! is a 46-minute live album of arias, art songs and folk songs from America, France, Ireland and Italy, performed by von Stade with piano accompaniment by Martin Katz. It was released in 1982.

== Recording ==
The album was compiled from digital recordings of a recital programme performed on 5 and 8 April 1981 at the Alice Tully Hall, New York City. The engineers used Neumann U-87 and KM-84 microphones, a Sony UMATIC recorder and a Sony PCM 1600 system. The album was mastered using CBS's DisComputer system.

== Cover art ==
The LP and cassette versions of the album share the same cover art, designed by Peter A. Alfieri, featuring a photograph of von Stade taken by Valerie Clement.

== Critical reception ==
=== Reviews ===
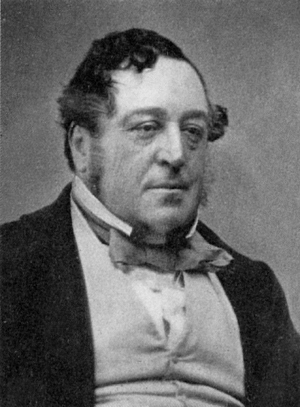
Gioachino Rossini, circa 1850

J. B. Steane reviewed the album on LP in Gramophone in June 1982. It was, he thought, an engaging, vivacious recital, but rather like a sandwich that was missing its proper slice of ham. The last track on the A side of the disc was "Tanti affetti" from Rossini's La donna del lago. It was a climactic end to the first half of the record in that it showed off Frederica von Stade's virtuoso technique, but, although not a shallow composition, it was not the substantial kind of piece that a recitalist should programme before her interval.

The B side of the disc began with Maurice Ravel's Cinq mélodies populaires grecques, "the nearest we come to the provision of a major work". The absence of more ambitious music was not the only reason that the disc felt slightly disappointing. "Good song recitals", Steane wrote, "have some meat, and then... jam!" Nothing in von Stade's album quite supplied the requisite sugar rush.

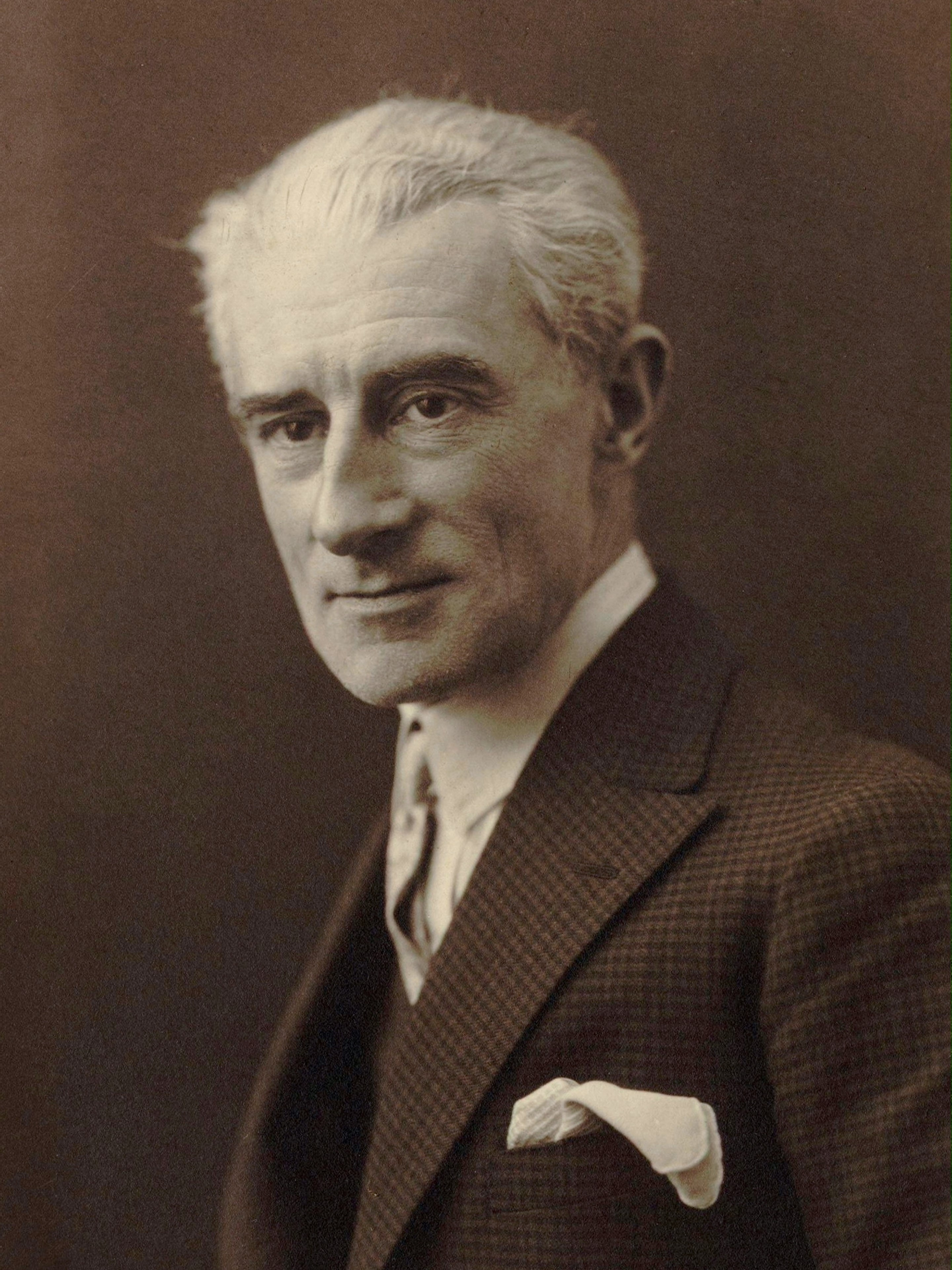
Maurice Ravel in 1925

Her American songs did not have a particularly high glycaemic index, and even her encore somehow failed to hit the mark. With its refrain of "the fairy was laughing too", "The leprechaun" had merely "the kind of charm that coaxes smiles and a somewhat cautious laugh". Von Stade's American songs evoked "an interest, a curiosity, an expectation of pleasure", but none of them was truly thrilling. Aaron Copland's "Why do they shut me out of heaven?", Richard Hundley's "The astronomers" and Virgil Thomson's "A prayer to St Catherine" were too quirky to be really exciting, and Hundley's "Come ready and see me", although engaging, was too gentle to be the right kind of song with which to bring down the curtain.

That the programming of the disc was not as well judged as it might have been did not mean that the album was lacking in delectable ingredients. Durante's "Danza, danza, fanciulla gentile", taken at a very sprightly pace, had a "gaiety [that was] delightful and infectious". The Rossini aria had "brilliant flourishes". Joseph Canteloube's "Brezairola" had a "dreamy beauty". Ravel's "Chanson de cueilleuses de lentisques" had a "quiet joy". Most cherishable of all were those songs that drew upon von Stade's special gift of wistfulness. Alessandro Scarlatti's "Se tu della mia morte" had an "indrawn sadness", and in Hundley's "Come ready and see me", "she has a song that might have been written for her, so well does it suit her voice and art."

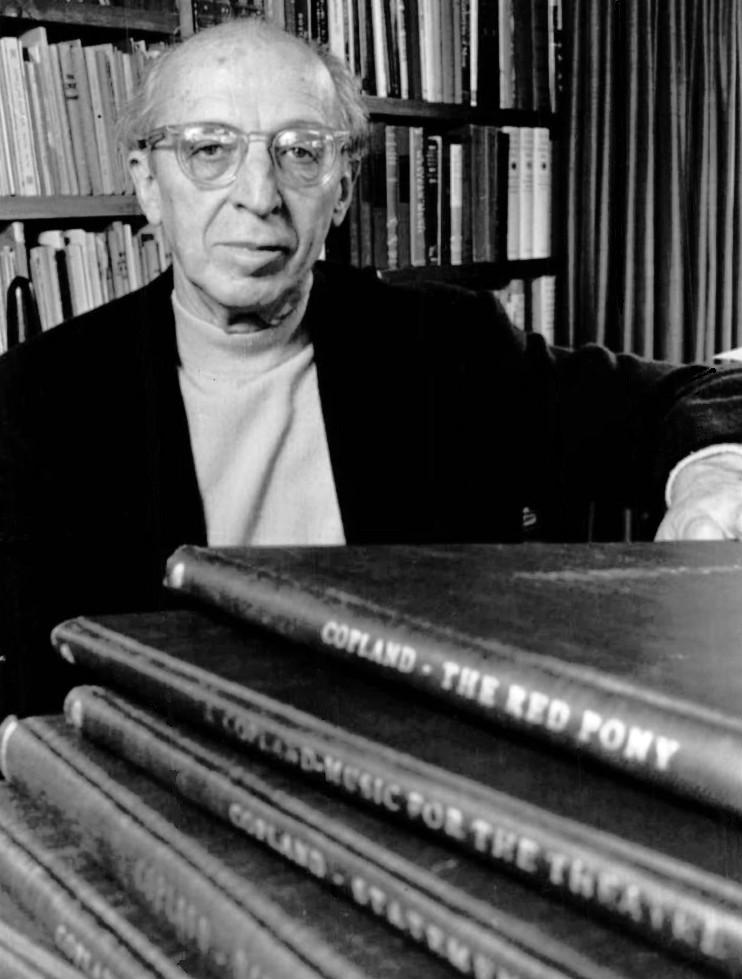
Aaron Copland in 1970

The album was well engineered, with "clear, natural and well-balanced" sound. Applause was included, but the LP was mercifully free from the type of intrusions perpetrated by audiences on some other live recordings. In sum, it was regrettable that the disc lacked "a particular sense of occasion" - the author of its sleeve notes had not even thought to mention where or when it had been recorded. But the album nevertheless deserved a warm welcome. It was one to be dipped into "for this song and that, rather than for the recital [as a whole], be it never so 'Live!'."

George Jellinek reviewed the album on LP in Stereo Review in November 1982. Frederica von Stade's rendition of Rossini's "Tanti affetti in tal momento", he wrote, was somewhat put in the shade by the "unforgettable bravura" of the version of the aria recorded by Marilyn Horne. It suffered, too, from being accompanied by a piano instead of by a chorus and orchestra. But there was nothing negative that could be said about her recital's other selections.

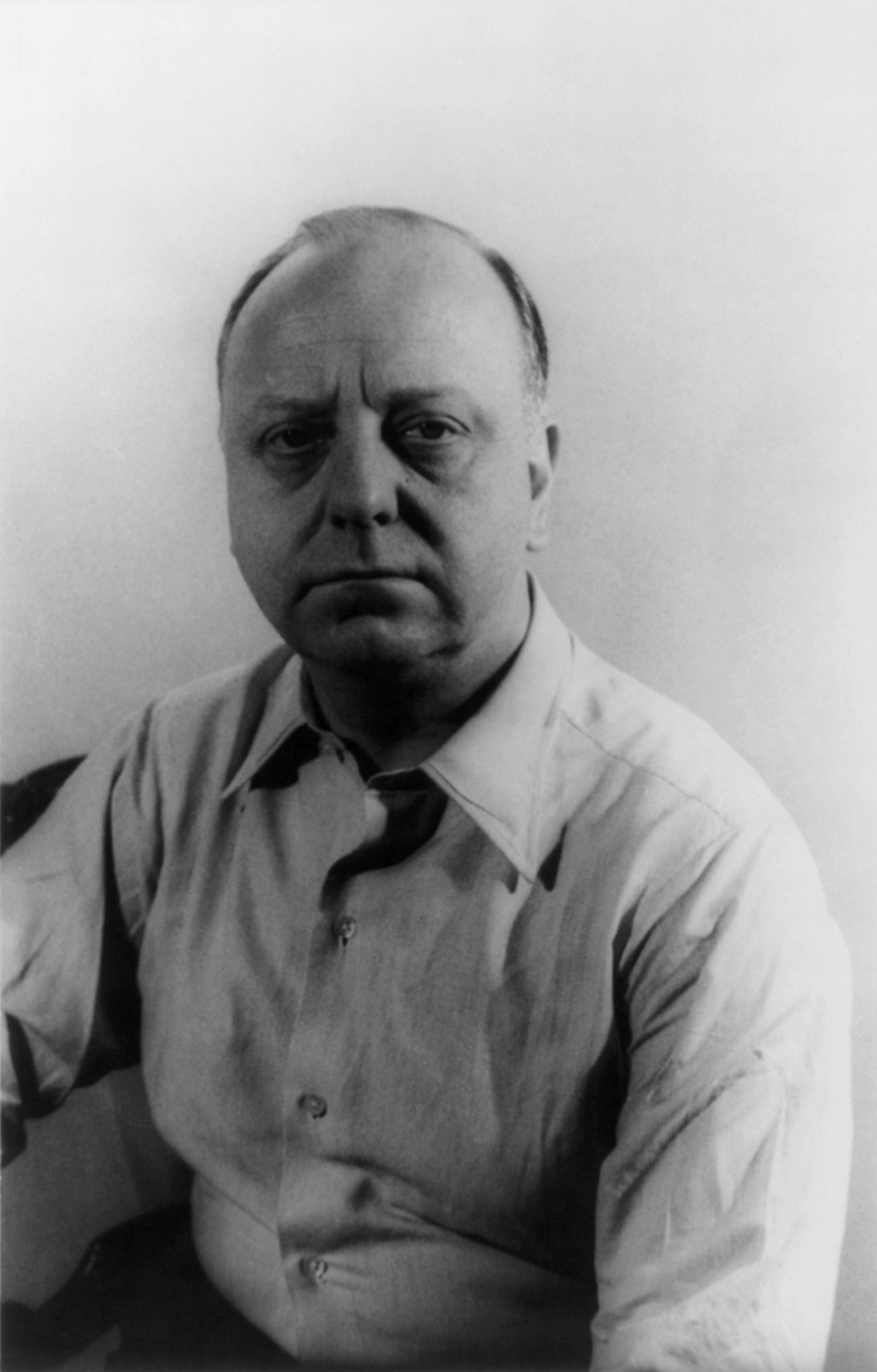
Virgil Thomson, photographed by Carl van Vechten in 1947

Her performances were "wonderful ... in her own exquisite style". She brought "her customary and much-praised musicality, lovely tone and sensitive control of dynamics to just about everything in this latest programme". Her American songs in particular were sung with "great charm and excellent diction". In some of her earlier records, the sheer beauty of her vocalism had not always been matched by the quality of her interpretations. But there was now "a certain intensity in her singing that is most welcome".

As usual, Martin Katz was an excellent partner at the piano, and the audio quality of CBS's digital recording was exceptionally good.

David Shengold wrote about the album in Opera News in 2016, reviewing a box set of von Stade CDs in which it was included. He praised her performance of Alessandro Scarlatti's "Se tu della mia morte" as "particularly exquisite" and her version of Ravel's Cinq mélodies populaires grecques as "affectingly done".

The album was also reviewed in The complete Penguin stereo record and cassette guide, which described it as "taken from a live recital with von Stade vivacious and characterful in generally lightweight repertory". Its sound quality, the book said, was "kind to the voice and naturally balanced".

=== Accolade ===
The album was nominated for a Grammy Award for the best classical solo vocal performance of 1982.

== CD track listing ==
Antonio Vivaldi (1678-1741)

Cantata, RV 672

- 1 (3:07) "Filli di gioia vuoi farmi morir"

Francesco Durante (1684-1755), arranged by Martin Katz

Solfèges d'Italie

- 2 (1:02) No. 137: "Danza, danza, fanciulla gentile"

Alessandro Scarlatti (1660-1725)

La caduta de' Decemviri ("The fall of the decemvirs", Naples, 1697, R345.33)

- 3 (5:14) "Se tu della mia morte"

Benedetto Marcello (1686-1739), arranged by Martin Katz

- 4 (4:32) "Il mio bel foco"

Gioachino Rossini (1792-1868)

La donna del lago ("The lady of the lake", Naples, 1819, with a libretto by Andrea Leone Tottola (?-1831) after The Lady of the Lake (1810) by Sir Walter Scott (1771-1832))

- 5 (7:19) "Tanti affetti in tal momento"

Maurice Ravel (1875-1937)

Cinq mélodies populaires grecques (1904-1906, from traditional texts, translated by Michel-Dimitri Calvocoressi (1877-1944))

- 6 (1:25) "Chanson de la mariée"
- 7 (1:37) "Là-bas, vers l'église"
- 8 (1:01) "Quel galant m'est comparable"
- 9 (3:07) "Chanson de cueilleuses de lentisques"
- 10 (0:57) "Tout gai!"

Joseph Canteloube (1879-1957), collector and arranger

Chants d'Auvergne (1923-1930)

- 11 (3:38) "Brezairola" (Vol. 3, No. 4)
- 12 (1:14) "L'aïo dè rotso" (Vol. 1, No. 3a)

Aaron Copland (1900-1990)

Twelve Poems of Emily Dickinson (1950)

- 13 (1:55) No. 3: "Why do they shut me out of Heaven?" (dedicated to Ingolf Dahl (1912-1970))

Richard Hundley (1931-2018)

- 14 (2:04) "The astronomers" (1959)

Virgil Thomson (1896-1989)

Mostly About Love: Four Songs for Alice Estey (1959, texts by Kenneth Koch (1925-2002))

- 15 (3:26) No. 4: "A prayer to St Catherine"

Richard Hundley

- 16 (2:41) "Come ready and see me" (1971, with a text by James Purdy (1924-2009))

Traditional, arranged by Herbert Hughes (1882-1937)

- 17 (2:01) "The leprechaun" (encore)

== Personnel ==
=== Musical ===
- Frederica von Stade (b. 1945), mezzo-soprano
- Martin Katz (b. 1944), piano

=== Other ===
- David Mottley, producer
- Bud Graham, engineer

== Release history ==
On 4 February 1982, CBS Masterworks released the album on LP (catalogue numbers M-37231 in Britain, IM-37231 in the US), with sleeve notes by Peter G. Davis and an insert with texts and translations. It was also issued on cassette (catalogue numbers 40-37231 in Britain, HMT-37231 in the US).

In 2016, Sony released the album on CD (in a miniature replica of its original LP sleeve) with a 52-page booklet in their 18-CD compilation Frederica von Stade: The Complete Columbia Recital Albums (catalogue number 88875183412). The album has never been issued on CD otherwise.
