= Francesco Durante =

Italian composer (1684–1755)

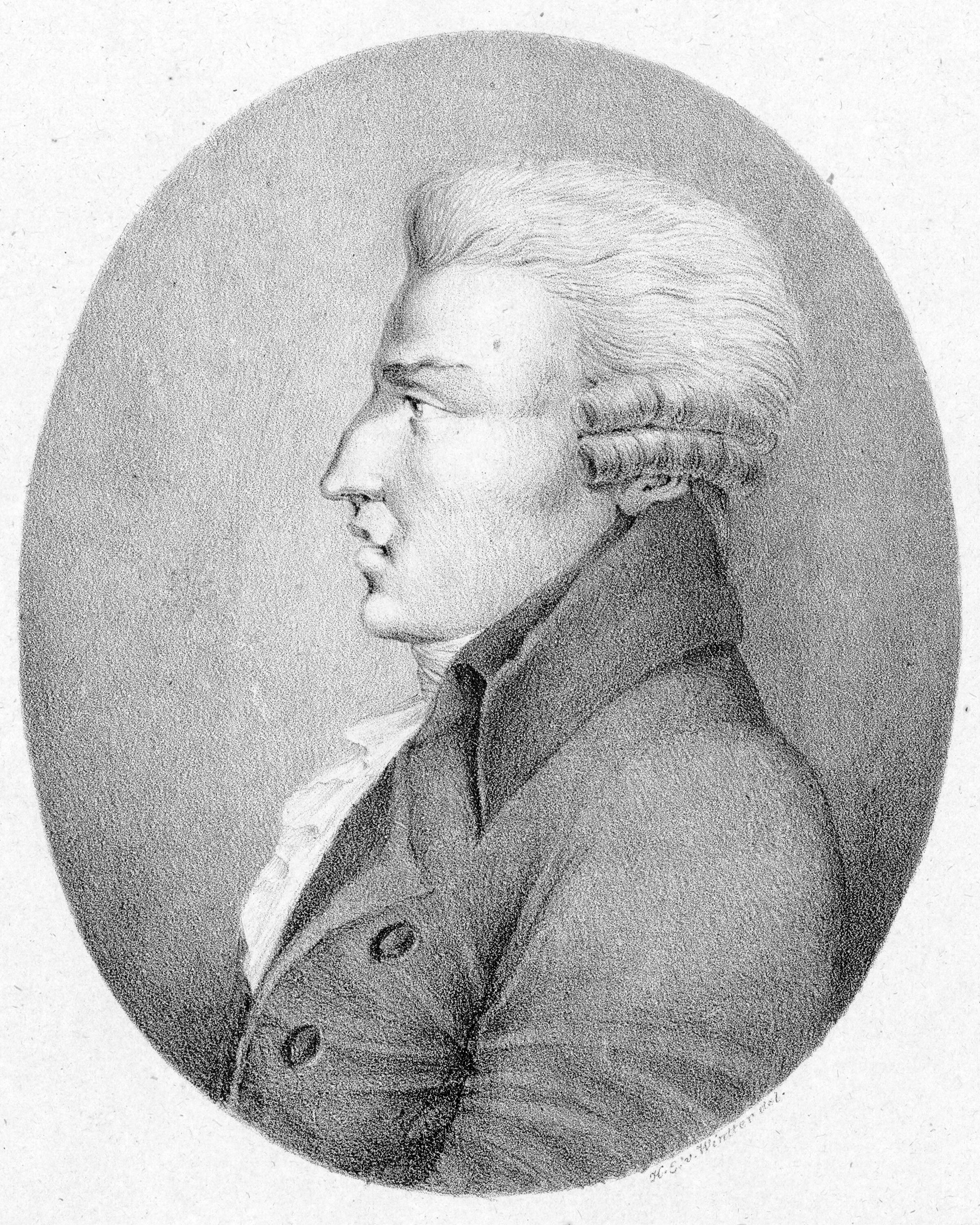
- Born: 31 March 1684; Frattamaggiore, [Kingdom of Naples
- Died: 30 September 1755 (aged 71); Naples
- Occupations: Composer; Educator

Francesco Durante (31 March 1684 – 30 September 1755) was an Italian composer of the Neapolitan School. Best known for his church music, he was also an important teacher, instructing Niccolò Jommelli, Giovanni Paisiello, Giovanni Battista Pergolesi, Niccolò Piccinni and Leonardo Vinci, among others.

== Life and work ==
He was born at Frattamaggiore, in the Kingdom of Naples. At an early age, he entered the Conservatorio dei poveri di Gesù Cristo, in Naples, where he received lessons from Gaetano Greco. Later, he became a pupil of Alessandro Scarlatti at the Conservatorio di Sant'Onofrio. He is also supposed to have studied under Bernardo Pasquini and Giuseppe Ottavio Pitoni in Rome, but there is no documentary evidence. He is said to have succeeded Scarlatti in 1725 at Sant' Onofrio, and to have remained there until 1742, when he succeeded Porpora as head of the Conservatorio di Santa Maria di Loreto, also in Naples. This post he held for thirteen years, till his death in Naples. He was married three times.

His fame as a teacher was considerable, and Niccolò Jommelli, Giovanni Paisiello, Giovanni Battista Pergolesi, Niccolò Piccinni and Leonardo Vinci were amongst his pupils. As a teacher, he insisted on the unreasoning observance of rules, differing thus from Scarlatti, who treated all his pupils as individuals.

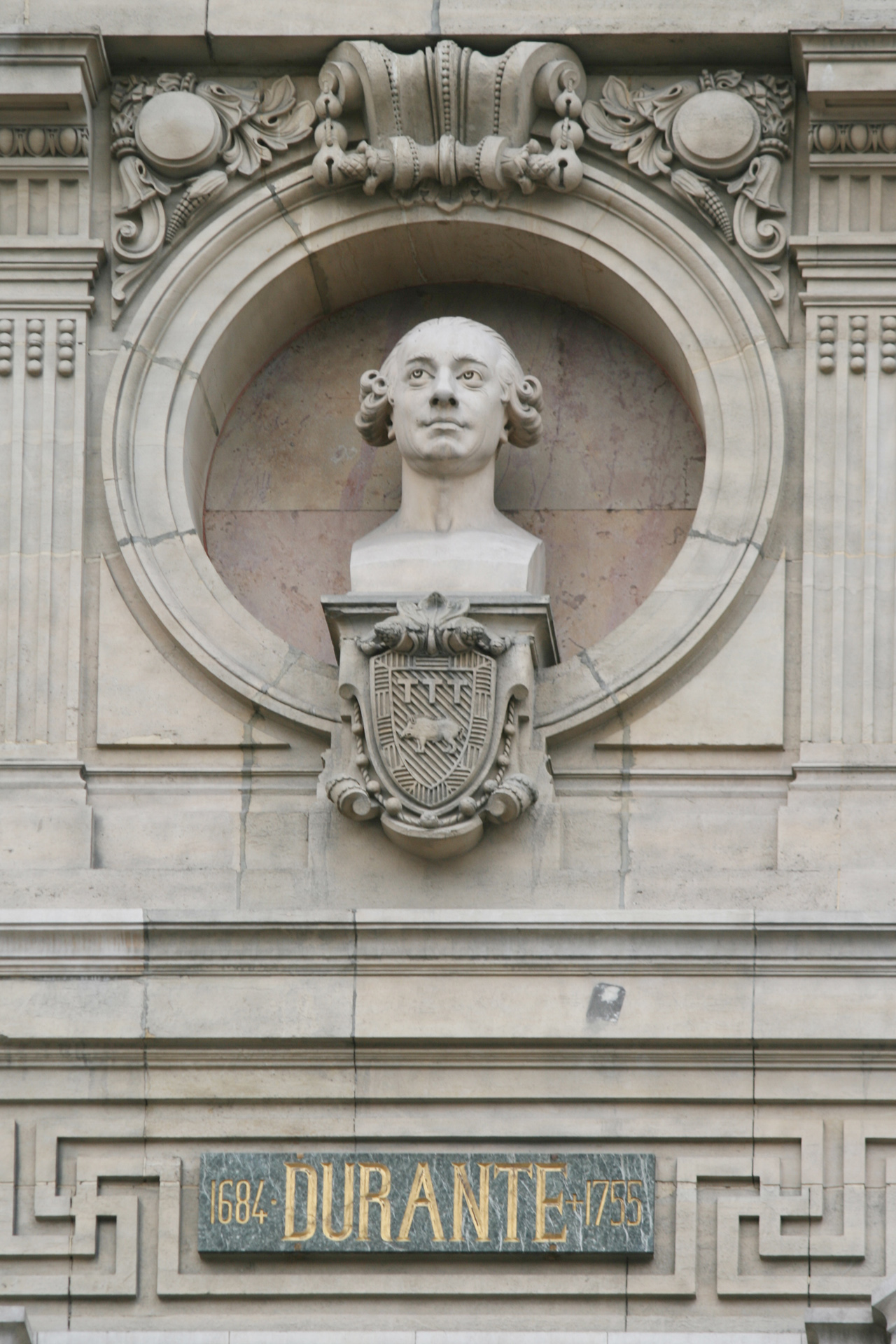
Durante finds a place on the Opéra Garnier, Paris, perhaps by virtue of his students

A complete collection of Durante's works, consisting almost exclusively of sacred music, was presented by Gaspare Selvaggi, a Neapolitan art collector and music theorist, to the Bibliothèque Nationale, Paris. A catalogue may be found in Fétis's Biographie universelle. The imperial library of Vienna also preserves a valuable collection of Durante's manuscripts. Two requiems, several masses (one of which, a most original work, is the Pastoral Mass for four voices) and the Lamentations of the prophet Jeremiah are amongst his most important settings. His Magnificat setting achieved popularity partly because of its misattribution to Pergolesi.

The fact that Durante never composed for the stage brought him an exaggerated reputation as a composer of sacred music. Considered one of the best church composers of his style and period, he seems to have founded the sentimental school of Italian church music. Nevertheless, Hasse protested against Durante's being described as the greatest harmonist of Italy, a title which he ascribed to Alessandro Scarlatti.

== Discography ==
- Solfèges d'Italie, No. 137: "Danza, danza, fanciulla gentile", with Frederica von Stade (mezzo-soprano) and Martin Katz (piano), CBS, 1982

== Media ==
- Vergine tutto amore

== Sources ==
- Sadie, S. (ed.) (1980) The New Grove Dictionary of Music & Musicians, [vol #5].
- Peter van Tour: Counterpoint and Partimento: Methods of Teaching Composition in Late Eighteenth-Century Naples. 2015. 318p. (Studia musicologica Upsaliensia, 0081-6744; 25) ISBN 978-91-554-9197-0.
