= Richard Hundley =

- Born: September 1, 1931; Cincinnati, Ohio
- Died: February 25, 2018 (aged 86) Englewood, N.J.
- Genre: Art songs
- Occupation: Composer
- Instrument: Piano
- Formerly of: Northern Kentucky Symphony Orchestra and the Metropolitan Opera Chorus

Richard Albert Hundley (September 1, 1931 – February 25, 2018) was an American pianist and composer of art songs for voice and piano. His works portray such depth of emotion that they have been compared to short stories, as they bring listeners of all ages to a world full of wonder, one lyrical line at a time.

== Early life ==
Hundley was born in Cincinnati, Ohio, to a family of lesser means. When he was only a toddler, his parents divorced, and he was placed in the care of his mother. At the age of seven, he was sent to live with his paternal grandmother, Anna Susan Campbell, at her home in Covington, Kentucky. Campbell, a lover of music, owned a lovely, large piano that immediately caught Hundley's attention. After no time at all, she came to realize that Hundley was a naturally gifted musician with a great interest in the piano, so she enrolled him in lessons with a local piano teacher by the name of Mrs. Wyman. Hundley's grandmother would come to be one of the largest influences on his life, as she encouraged his musical pursuits and provided financial support for his education.

In 1941, Hundley attended his first opera, Il trovatore, by Giuseppe Verdi, performed by the Cincinnati Summer Opera company. This performance planted the seed for Hundley's love of portraying deep, sincere human emotion through song.

At the age of eleven, Hundley was accepted into the Cincinnati Conservatory of Music and began taking piano lessons with Madame Illona Voorm, a strict Hungarian professional. Her rigorous method of instruction would more than adequately prepare Hundley to enter the professional world of music. When he was 14, Hundley performed Mozart's Piano Concerto in d Minor (k. 466) with the Northern Kentucky Symphony Orchestra. Only two years later, he was hired by the Cincinnati Symphony to perform a movement from Mozart's Piano Concerto in A Major.

By the time Hundley reached his freshman and sophomore years of high school, he had grown much more fond of improvisation than memorization. Although he had a gift for improvisation, he had difficulty notating what he would play. It took about a year for Hundley to overcome this struggle. That same year, he fell in love with a young woman from one of his English courses. Upon meeting the girl's mother, however, he lost interest in the young woman. He was much more interested in what her mother, Mary Rodgers Fossit, had to teach. Fossit, a poet and musician, provided a space in which Hundley could develop the ability to articulate his feelings well and portray them through the vehicle of song. Each time Hundley would visit her, she would show him a variety of works from different authors such as Gertrude Stein and Herbert Weinstock, a biographer that wrote about the lives of Peter Ilyich Tchaikovsky and Frederic Chopin. Eventually, the two collaborated in the composition of several pieces. Fossit would write the text, and Hundley would set it to music. A few of their pieces even won a prize in the National Scholastic Magazine Competition. Hundley's friendship and collaboration with Fossit demonstrated that he was not only a talented pianist, but a skillful composer as well.

== Career and Accomplishments ==
In 1948, Hundley graduated from Northern Kentucky High School. Two years later, he moved to New York City, after receiving the blessing of his grandmother. Subsequently, he enrolled in the Manhattan School of Music. Unfortunately, he dropped out after a year, due to financial difficulties. For the next several years, Hundley would move back and forth between Kentucky and New York. It wasn't until 1957 that he decided to remain in N.Y.C.

During the late 1950s, Hundley returned to focusing on composition and was introduced to other composers by the founder of the Rachmaninov Society, Noel Ferrand. He was also introduced to Israel Citkowitz, who became his instructor of counterpoint. Citkowitz was highly critical of Hudley's works, but this did not dim the young composer's spark.

In 1960, he was selected for the Metropolitan Opera Chorus, following a rigorous audition process in which he had to learn ten operas in four different languages. Throughout his time with the group, Hundley shared his original songs with several of its well-known female singers, including Anna Moffo. Soon after being introduced to his work, Moffo performed a few of his pieces during her tours in the U.S. and several European cities, increasing the young composer's renown. During his time with the chorus, the General Music Publishing Company published seven of his pieces, further increasing his clout in the musical world. Hundley remained a member of the group from 1960 to 1964. The same year he left, Hundley set six of John Fletcher's poems, including "Sweet Rivers" and "Green Woods are Dumb" to music. Although he only spent a couple of years with the Metropolitan Opera Chorus, he credited much of his development as a songwriter to his years spent with the group, as well as his time acting as accompanist for Zinka Milanov's vocal studio.

Hundley joined Milanov's studio in 1967, and his collaboration with this highly esteemed soprano and her students heavily impacted his compositional style. Milanov was an expert of bel canto singing, a style of singing that is quite lyrical and flows smoothly. Thus, Hundley learned to imitate the cadence of the English language with his beautiful, flowing pieces.

In 1982 the International American Music Competition included several of his works in its repertoire list for pieces for vocalists of high quality. Two years later, Hundley was hired to be the composer-in-residence at the Newport Music Festival for a full season.

In 1987, Hundley was declared one of the standard American composers for vocalists by the International American Music Competition.

Of all the pieces Hundley penned, his most well-known work is "Come Ready and See Me." Notably, many of his compositions do not fit a particular period or style, but the influence of his work as a singer is evident in his writing. He incorporated a plethora of musical elements in his works, such as melismas, dissonance, and counter melodies, and he placed great emphasis on the piano's role in telling the story alongside the vocalist.

Hundley passed away in the city of Englewood, N.J., on February 25, 2018.

== Compositions ==
=== For solo voice ===
- "Spring" (1952)
- Softly the Summer (1957)
- Epitaph on a Wife (1957)
- "The Astronomers" (1959)
- "Maiden Snow" (1960)
- Isaac Greentree (An Epitaph) (1960)
- Wild Plum (1961)
- Ballad on Queen Anne's Death (1962)
- Spring (1962)
- For Your Delight (1962)
- I am not lonely (1963)
- Daffodils (1963)
- My Master Hath a Garden (1963)
- Postcard from Spain (1963)
- "A Package of Cookies" (1963)
- Some Sheep are Loving (1964)
- "Awake the Sleeping Sun" (1965)
- Screw Spring (1968)
- "Heart, We Will Forget Him" (1970)
- "Letter from Emily" (1970)
- "Will There Really Be a Morning?" (1970)
- "When Children are Playing Alone on the Green" (1970)
- Come Ready and See Me (1971)
- Lions (1971)
- Birds, U.S.A. (1972)
- I Do (1974)
- Evening Hours (1975)
- Bartholomew Green (1978)
- Sweet Suffolk Owl (1979)
- When Orpheus Played (1979)
- Arise My Love (1981)
- The Girls of Golden Summers (1982)
- Waterbird (1988)
- Straightway beauty on me waits (1989)
- Strings in the Earth and Air (1989)
- "Fine Manners" (1989)
- Awake the Sleeping Sun (1991)
- The Elephant is Slow to Mate (1992)
- "Moonlight's Watermelon" (1993)
- White Fields (1995)
- Whales of California (1996)
- O My Darling Troubles Heaven With Her Loveliness (1998)

== Pieces from song collection "Octaves and Sweet Sounds" ==
- "Seashore Girls" (1990)
- "Straightway Beauty on Me Waits" (1990)
- "Strings in the Earth and Air" (1990)
- "Well Welcome" (1990)

== John Fletcher Poems Set to Music Between 1964 and 1966 ==
- "Weep no More"
- "Tell Me Dearest"
- "What is Love?"
- "Sweet River"
- God of the Sheep"
- "Green Woods are Dumb"
- "Care Charming Sheep"

=== Duet(s) ===
- Just Why Johnnie Was Jimmie (1964)

== Quartet(s) ==
"Vocal Quartets to Poems by James Purdy" (1971)

== Discography ==
- Under the bluest sky...Songs of Richard Hundley David Parks (tenor) Read Gainsford (piano)
- The Astronomers, with Frederica von Stade (mezzo-soprano) and Martin Katz (piano), CBS, 1982
- Come Ready And See Me, with Frederica von Stade (mezzo-soprano) and Martin Katz (piano), CBS, 1982
