= Capriccio burlesco =

1968 orchestral work by Sir William Walton

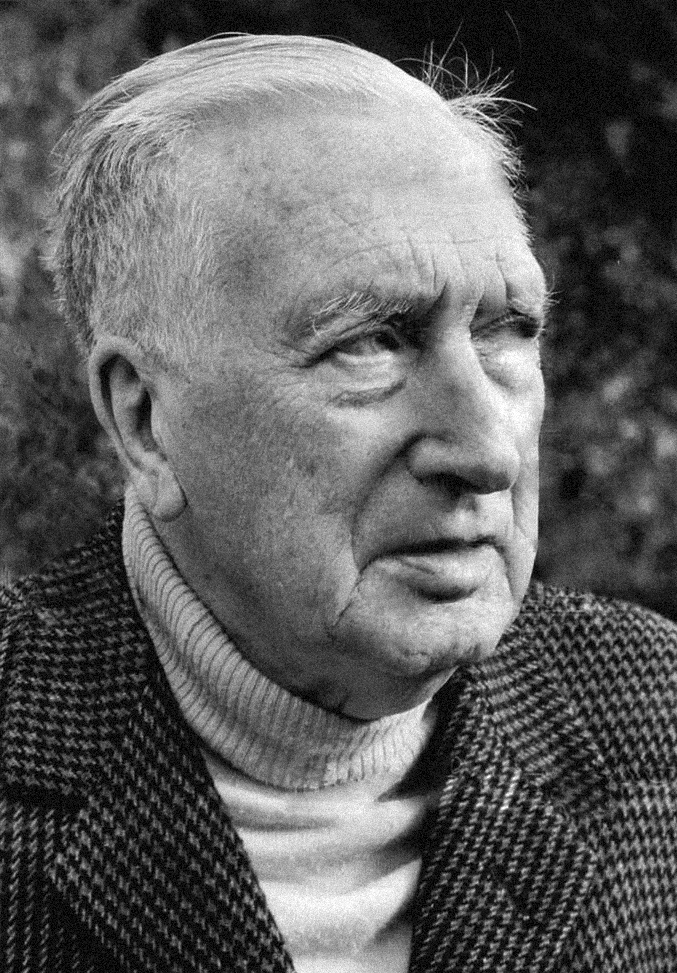
William Walton in 1976

Capriccio burlesco is an orchestral work by Sir William Walton, written between May and September 1968 at his home in Ischia, Italy.

It was commissioned by the New York Philharmonic in celebration of its 125th anniversary, and was dedicated to Andre Kostelanetz, who conducted the first performance on 7 December 1968 at the Lincoln Center for the Performing Arts, New York City. Kostelanetz also made the premiere recording of the work, with the New York Philharmonic.

The work lasts about 7 minutes and is exuberant, bustling and jaunty.

== See also ==
- Inscape (1967)
