= Twelve Poems of Emily Dickinson =

Song cycle for medium voice and piano by Aaron Copland

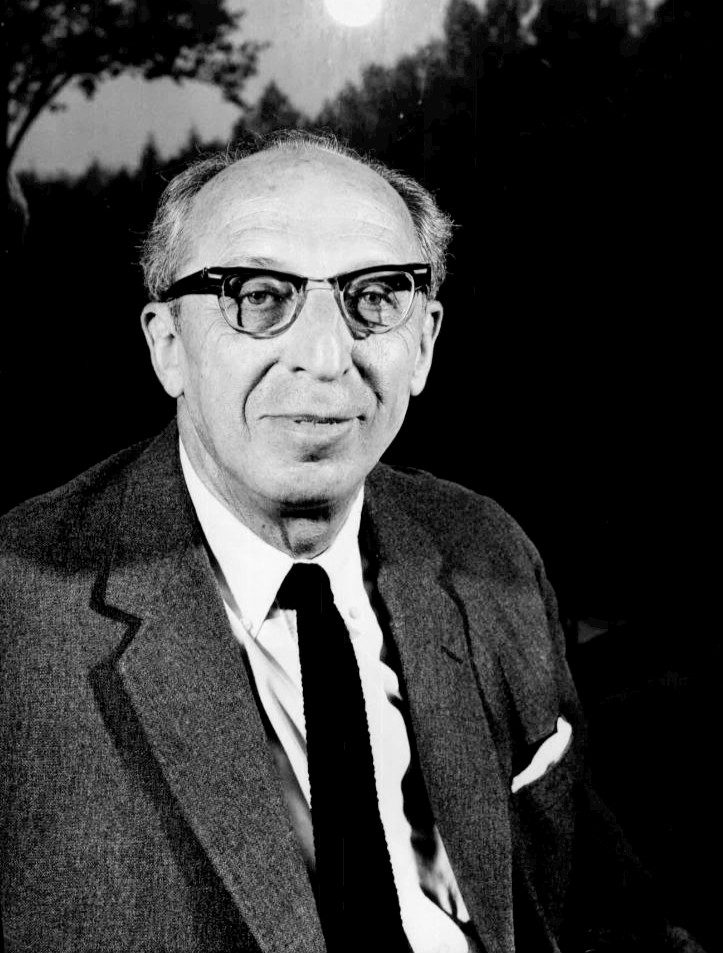
Aaron Copland in 1962

Twelve Poems of Emily Dickinson is a song cycle for medium voice, played in piano by the American composer Aaron Copland.

Completed in 1950 and lasting for under half an hour only, it represents Copland's longest work for solo voice. He assigned the first line of each poem as the song title, since Emily Dickinson had not written a title for any of the pieces. The exception is "The Chariot," which was Dickinson's original published title.

Each song is dedicated to a composer friend. The sequence, with dedicatees, is:

1. Nature, the Gentlest Mother (David Diamond)
2. There Came a Wind Like a Bugle (Elliott Carter)
3. Why Do They Shut Me Out of Heaven? (Ingolf Dahl)
4. The World Feels Dusty (Alexei Haieff)
5. Heart, We Will Forget Him! (Marcelle de Manziarly)
6. Dear March, Come In! (Juan Orrego-Salas)
7. Sleep Is Supposed to Be (Irving Fine)
8. When They Come Back (Harold Shapero)
9. I Felt a Funeral in My Brain (Camargo Guarnieri)
10. I've Heard an Organ Talk Sometimes (Alberto Ginastera)
11. Going to Heaven! (Lukas Foss)
12. The Chariot (Arthur Berger)

Copland himself acknowledged that many have heard the influence of Charles Ives, Gustav Mahler, and Gabriel Fauré in the songs. In his own memoirs, he made the link between Dickinson's and Mahler's preoccupation with death. However, he stated that he recognized no direct musical influence. Nonetheless, writers have frequently cited the fifth song in particular, "Heart, We Will Forget Him!" as being Copland at his most Mahlerian. This is perhaps even more evident in the arrangement he composed for orchestral setting, which he began in 1958 and completed in 1970; Eight Poems of Emily Dickinson for small orchestra omits songs 3, 8, 9 and 10 from the original sequence.

The original version was premiered at Columbia University on 18 May 1950, with soloist Alice Howland accompanied by the composer. It was not especially well received by critics, prompting Copland to note wryly to Leonard Bernstein "that I decided I must have written a better cycle than I had realized." The first recording was made by Copland and Martha Lipton for Columbia Masterworks Records in 1950-2 and issued in 1956. The premiere of the orchestration was given on 14 November 1970 at the Metropolitan Museum of Art, New York City, with soloist Gwendolyn Killebrew and the Juilliard Orchestra conducted by Michael Tilson Thomas. The orchestral arrangement was first recorded by Marni Nixon and the Pacific Symphony Orchestra under Keith Clark for Varese Sarabande in 1985. Tilson Thomas subsequently recorded the cycle for EMI with Barbara Hendricks and the London Symphony Orchestra in 1995.

Both versions have been recorded many times since their respective premieres.

== Discography ==
- No. 3: "Why Do They Shut Me Out Of Heaven?", with Frederica von Stade (mezzo-soprano) and Martin Katz (piano), CBS, 1982
