= Short Symphony =

Symphony by Aaron Copland

- (Symphony No. 2)
- by Aaron Copland
- Aaron Copland in 1930
- Composed: 1931–33
- Dedication: Carlos Chávez
- Duration: around 15 minutes
- Movements: 3

Premiere
- Date: November 23, 1934
- Location: Mexico City
- Conductor: Carlos Chávez
- Performers: Sinfónica de México

The Short Symphony, or Symphony No. 2, is a symphony written by the American composer Aaron Copland from 1931 to 1933. The name derives from the symphony's short length of only 15 minutes. The work is dedicated to Copland's friend, the Mexican composer and conductor Carlos Chávez. The symphony's first movement is in sonata-allegro form, and its slow second movement follows an adapted ternary form. The third movement resembles the sonata-allegro but has indications of cyclic form. The composition contains complex rhythms and polyharmonies, and it incorporates the composer's emerging interest in serialism as well as influences from Mexican music and German cinema. The symphony includes scoring for a heckelphone and a piano while omitting trombones and a percussion section. Copland later arranged the symphony as a sextet.

The symphony was not widely performed during Copland's lifetime, largely due to the piece's challenging rhythmic variations. After Serge Koussevitzky and Leopold Stokowski both declined to conduct the premiere, Chávez agreed to deliver it in 1934 in Mexico City. The symphony eventually received its U.S. premiere in 1944, with subsequent concert performances in the 1950s. The piece's first recording was made in 1969 with Copland conducting. Though Copland thought of the Short Symphony as "one of the best things I ever wrote", some critics found it to be fragmented and cacophonous. Others agreed with Copland's assessment, describing the symphony as a masterpiece and a significant work in both Copland's career and the development of modernist music.

== History ==
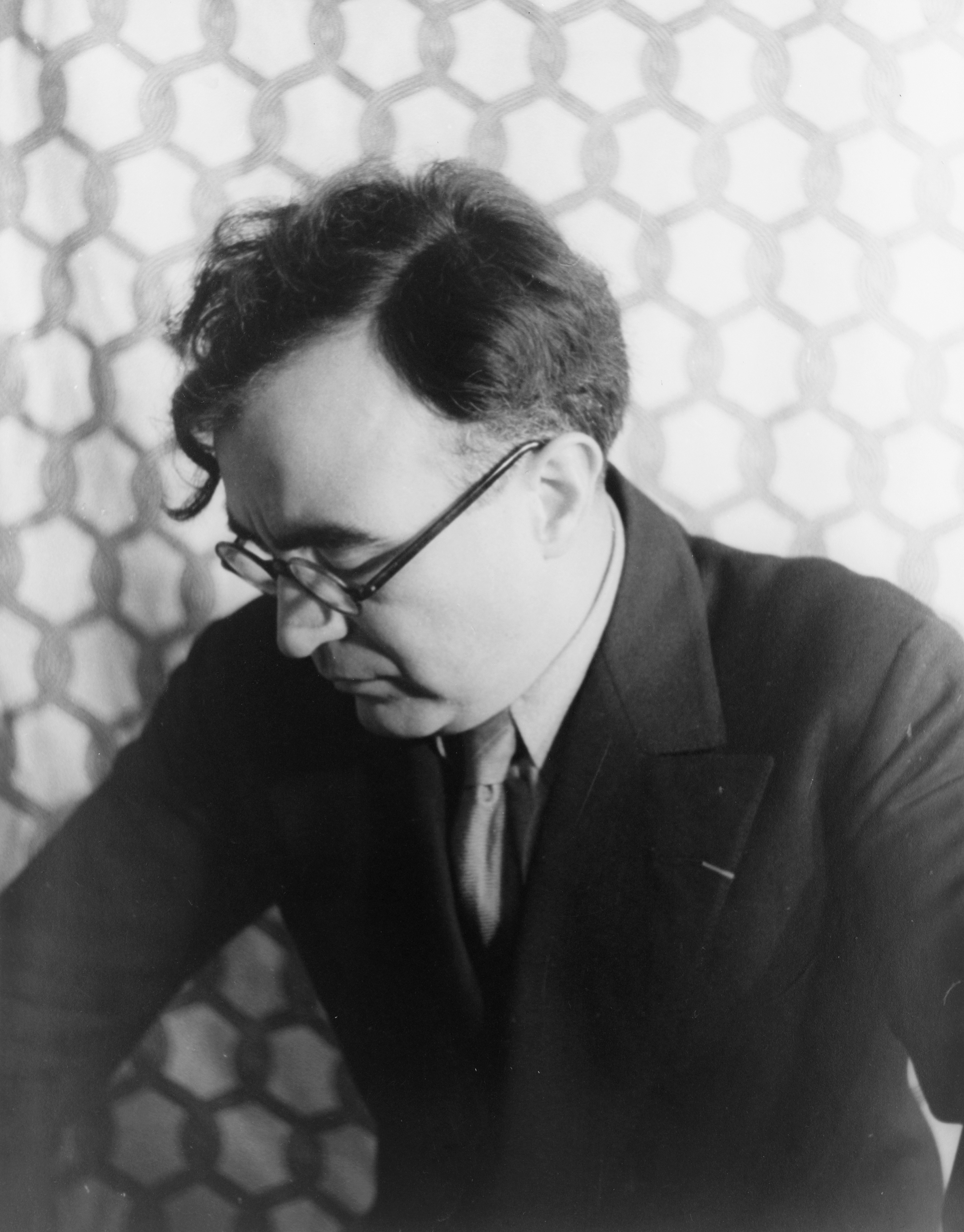
Carlos Chávez, the symphony's dedicatee, in 1937

From 1926 to 1928, Copland arranged his Organ Symphony into his First Symphony, and in 1929, arranged music from his ballet score Grohg into the ballet suite Dance Symphony. Though both of these "symphonies" preceded the Short Symphony, Copland did not think of the Dance Symphony as a real symphony. Thus, the Short Symphony is considered to be Copland's second symphony—with the composer himself having referred to it as such.

Copland began work on the Short Symphony in 1931. By 1932, Copland was sketching, composing, and revising the symphony in parallel with another composition, Statements for Orchestra. While staying at the Yaddo estate during the summer of 1932, Copland wrote to the pianist John Kirkpatrick that the composition of the Short Symphony had been disrupted because he was simultaneously working on Statements for Orchestra.

At the urging of his friend and fellow composer Carlos Chávez, Copland made his first trip to Mexico in the fall of 1932. In Mexico, Copland continued working on his two orchestral pieces and was impressed by the country's people and music. The trip inspired Copland to incorporate traditional Mexican elements into the finale of the Short Symphony, as well as begin the symphonic piece El Salón México. Work on the Short Symphony extended into the next year; Copland explained the delay in a 1969 radio program, saying that he "was intent on writing as perfected a piece of music as I possibly could". The symphony was completed in 1933 before the completions of Statements for Orchestra and El Salón México, thus becoming the first product of Copland's Mexican travels. Copland would make several more trips to Mexico during extended working vacations.

After conductors Serge Koussevitzky and Leopold Stokowski both declined to premiere the Short Symphony due to its rhythmic difficulties, Chávez agreed to conduct the work's world premiere. It was first performed in Mexico City on November 23, 1934 by Chávez and the Sinfónica de México. In gratitude, Copland dedicated the symphony to Chávez. The symphony remained unperformed for a decade following its premiere. Stokowski had originally put the Short Symphony on a program of contemporary works to be presented during the fall 1935 season of the Philadelphia Orchestra; however, he described the work as "asymetrical in rhythm and very difficult" and later cancelled the performance. Koussevitzky also announced and then cancelled a performance of the symphony. When Copland asked the conductor if the piece was too difficult, Koussevitzky allegedly replied, "Non ce n'est pas trop difficile, c'est impossible!" (English: "No it's not too difficult, it's impossible!"). Stokowski eventually turned, and he conducted the NBC Symphony Orchestra for the symphony's U.S. radio broadcast premiere in Radio City Music Hall, New York City, on January 9, 1944. Another performance was given in 1955 by the Südwestfunk Radio Orchestra in Baden-Baden. In 1957, Leonard Bernstein conducted the New York Philharmonic in the piece's U.S. concert premiere. This was followed by the U.S. West Coast premiere at the 1958 Ojai Music Festival in Southern California, with Copland conducting.

In 1937, Copland arranged the Short Symphony as the Sextet for Clarinet, String Quartet, and Piano. Copland called this an "act of desperation" to make the piece less difficult to play. The Sextet was first performed in 1939 but subsequently received few performances. He also permitted an arrangement of the symphony by Dennis Russell Davies for a conventional chamber orchestra, which was completed in 1979.

== Instrumentation ==
The symphony is scored for:

Woodwinds:

piccolo
2 flutes (flute 1 doubling flute in G)
2 oboes
heckelphone (doubling cor anglais)
2 clarinets
bass clarinet
2 bassoons
double bassoon

Brass:

4 horns
2 trumpets

piano

Strings:

violins I, II
violas
cellos
double bass

The American composer Alan Stout observes that the instrumentation of the Short Symphony is closely similar to that of Chávez's Sinfonía de Antígona, as both works include a heckelphone while omitting trombones. The scoring of woodwinds, brasses, and strings in pairs also resembles the instrumentation found in Classical symphonies by Haydn and Mozart. Though Copland did not include a percussion section, the piano was effectively used as a percussion instrument.

== Structure ==
The symphony is in three movements, without breaks in between:

1. Incisivo ( = 144)
2. Espressivo ( = c. 44)
3. Preciso e ritmico ( = 144)

A typical performance is expected to last only 15 minutes. This length is what gave rise to the name Short Symphony.

=== I. Incisivo ===
The first movement is in sonata-allegro form, consisting of an exposition where two themes are first stated, a development, a recapitulation where the themes are restated, and a coda. The movement's opening five-note motive implies the triads of both D major and D minor, creating the first of numerous tonal ambiguities found throughout the work. Copland uses this motive to construct the movement's first theme in the tonal center of G.

This theme is repeated throughout the orchestra in the opening bars and is later heard in augmentation with a B♭ center, beginning with the flutes and clarinets:

The second theme centered on E is then stated by the heckelphone, with jazz-like syncopated rhythms:

The development section of the first movement is brief, consisting of only thirteen measures. It makes use of traditionally fugal elements such as stretto, which becomes a common device for the symphony's thematic development. This is followed by the return of the first and second themes, which now revolve around the tonal centers of B♭ and D, respectively. The movement concludes with a coda, where the entire orchestra restates the first theme centered on G.

The movement's tonal centers are in mediant and submediant relationships. This characteristic can be traced back to the mediant relationships between keys in Beethoven's works, whose use of such relationships departed from other Classical period music. Passages in the movement also make frequent use of complex rhythms and meter changes. The beginning of the recapitulation sees ten meter changes in fourteen measures, followed by an episode where as many as six meters are played simultaneously. A later passage has thirteen meter changes in a span of nineteen measures.

=== II. Espressivo ===
The second movement is short—only 95 measures long—and is substantially slower in tempo than the previous movement. The musicologist Howard Pollack describes the movement's structure to be in ABA ternary form. However, according to the Copland scholar Quincy C. Hilliard, the structure of this movement differs from typical second movements as it resembles an ABBA "arch" design rather than the normal ABA form. This movement also contains some material from the first theme of the first movement, indicating the use of cyclic form which becomes more prominent in the third movement.

The A section is dirge-like and begins with a descending tetrachord theme with a B♭ center played by the flute in G:

The theme is varied and then played in counterpoint (e.g. in stretto) by other instruments before the beginning of the B section at a slightly faster tempo. The B section is lighter and more dance-like, with an F tonal center. Its theme is introduced by the flute in G and imitated in a canon-like form by the woodwinds.

The A and B section themes are heard in counterpoint in a four measure transition followed by the return of the B section theme. The A section theme is then reused in a stretto before the second movement is concluded and transitions into the third movement.

=== III. Preciso e ritmico ===
Though the formal design of the third movement resembles the sonata-allegro form, it does not adhere strictly to it. For example, Julia Smith's 1955 book on Copland states that the movement follows the cyclic principle. Such a form was devised by the composer César Franck and reuses related thematic material from other movements for structural unity. The movement opens with a motive in the bass clarinet with pizzicato accompaniment, outlining the D♭ major triad. The first theme with a D♭ tonal center is then introduced by a variety of instruments beginning with the flutes, while accompanied by a rhythmic ostinato in the second violins.

A syncopated motive follows, which matures into the second theme with an F tonal center in the violins:

Following a development section, a modified version of the first theme returns, with different melodic intervals but still centered around D♭ and accompanied by the ostinato. The syncopated second theme also returns, this time with an A♭ tonal center. The coda begins with a return of the first movement's first theme, indicating the use of the cyclic principle. The symphony ends on an open fifth, a chord which is repeated two more times in the 1955 revision of the score.

The orchestration of the third movement makes more frequent use of the entire orchestra than that of the previous movements, using effects such as muted trumpets, col legno, pizzicato, and jeté. This movement also features many meter changes and syncopated rhythms. Pollack identifies "some assimilation of Mexican music" in the symphony's final movement. While composing the Short Symphony, Copland himself told friends that "The Third movement ... begins to sound rather Mexican to me." The finale also quotes a Werner R. Heymann song featured in Erik Charell's German film operetta Der Kongress tanzt (The Congress Dances), which Copland had seen in a 1931 visit to Berlin.

== Style ==
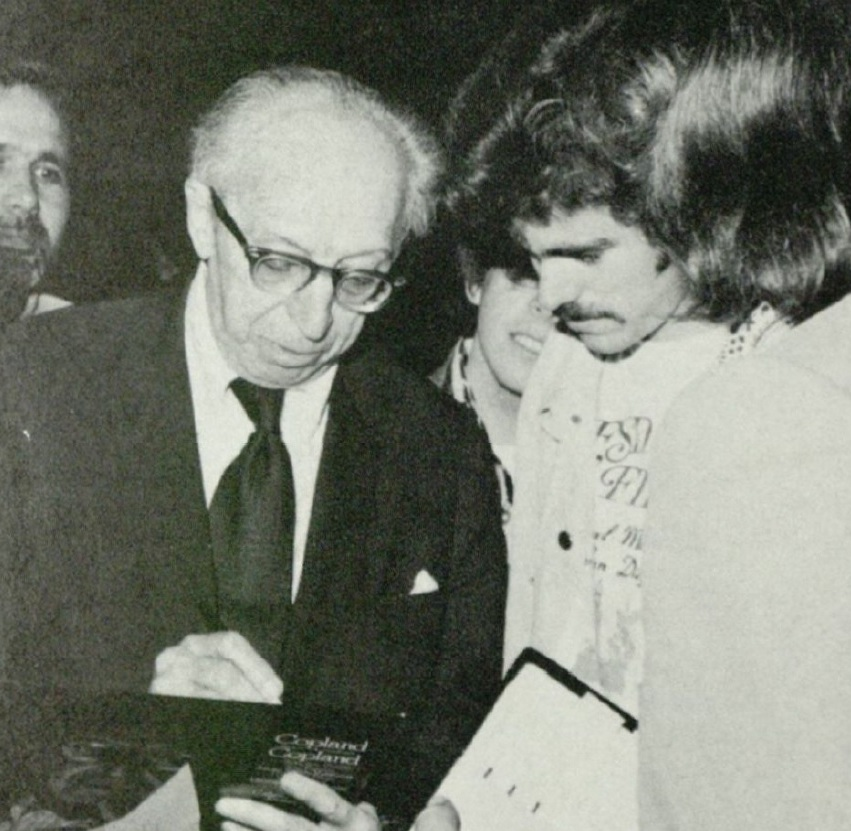
Aaron Copland (left) c. 1975

Pollack considers the Short Symphony to be "sprightly and charming", and its "sharp dissonances" and "rhythmic jolts" to be of a humorous nature. He notes as well that the symphony could be neoclassical in style, comparing the first movement to a concerto grosso while identifying a motive in the third movement that is also found in the finale of Mozart's Jupiter Symphony. Based on the rhythms and harmonies, the musicologist Jennifer DeLapp ascribes a modernist character to the symphony.

=== Rhythm ===
In 1929, Copland composed his Symphonic Ode for orchestra, which features many changing meters. When the conductor Serge Koussevitzky suggested that Copland reduce the number of meter changes to make the piece more playable, Copland initially refused Koussevitzky's suggestion but relented after a sobering rehearsal with the Boston Symphony Orchestra. The rhythmic difficulties of the Symphonic Ode reappear in the Short Symphony, which presents not only rapid meter changes but also irregular beat divisions and polyrhythms. Pollack argued that the rhythmically complex style of the symphony's passages places the conductor into a role "more of supervision than control", a role very different from that of the typical virtuoso conductor. The wariness of conductors towards the challenges of the Short Symphony's rhythm led Copland to temper such complexities in his later works.

Jazz music played an important influence on Copland's rhythmic choices in the Short Symphony. In 1967, when asked by the composer Edward T. Cone whether his music in works like the Short Symphony became more international in style, Copland responded:

Perhaps, but nonetheless I like to think of them as being in some way American. Their rhythmic life is definitely American, and influenced by jazz, although there are no literal quotations. I wouldn't have thought of those rhythms, particularly in the Short Symphony, if I hadn't had a jazz orientation.

=== Tonality and serialism ===
The first two movements of the symphony are defined by mostly consistent tonal centers, with hints of polyharmony. The last movement has varying tonalities from stronger implications of polyharmony. Harmonies in the symphony also make use of polychords.

In his interview with Copland, Cone asked how Copland's style "moved toward serialism and twelve-tone writing"—compositional methods associated with the composer Arnold Schoenberg. Copland responded that this change in style and technique came in the early 1930s, namely with the 1930 piece Piano Variations. He also once told the musicologist Vivian Perlis:

[Serialism] forced me into a different, more fragmented kind of melodic writing that in turn resulted in chords I had rarely used before. Thus my harmonic writing was affected in the Piano Variations, and in the works that followed—the Short Symphony and Statements for Orchestra. These pieces are more dissonant than my earlier works, yet I did not give up tonality.

The musicologist Bryan R. Simms believes Copland's interest in Schoenberg's methods began in the early 1920s while studying under Nadia Boulanger. By 1928, Copland had analyzed Schoenberg's Suite for Piano and began experimentally composing with tone rows and other serial methods. An early example that both Copland and Simms cite is "Poet's Song", a 1927 setting of an E. E. Cummings poem. (Note: Simms disagrees with Copland's assessment of "Poet's Song" as "quite twelve-tony" because Simms believes the piece reveals "only the most rudimentary tone rows.") In 1930, Copland incorporated a motive, its retrograde, and its retrograde-inversion into his Piano Variations, along with other applications of serial techniques. This interest in serial and twelve-tone music continued to influence Copland and the composition of the Short Symphony, not only in the work's dissonance but also in sketches which show that Copland wrote out themes for the symphony in retrograde, inversion, and retrograde-inversion. The music critic Malcolm MacDonald also notes the use of retrograded and inverted patterns in the symphony's second movement.

== Reception ==
In his review of the 1944 U.S. premiere for The New York Times, Noel Straus reports that the Short Symphony was "warmly received". However, he criticized that "[the symphony] is all so manufactured and uncommunicative that it never gets anywhere in particular and leaves the impression of futile fragmentariness in general." He also finds that the piece "cannot be reckoned among its composer's important contributions" and that it was a "cacophonous maze of intricacies". In 1965, Copland conducted the London Symphony Orchestra in a performance of Igor Stravinsky's Symphony in C followed by the Short Symphony. While the critic Edmund Tracey reports that the concert delighted the audience, he assesses that the Short Symphony revealed the "genius" of Stravinsky in contrast to the "inadequacy" of Copland. Tracey writes that the Short Symphony "made claims that it never fulfilled" and "raised topics that it appeared to discuss while not really doing so".

The symphony was lauded by others. Carlos Chávez wrote to Copland in December 1934: "It is impossible to tell you in a few words how much I enjoy the Little Symphony (Note: Chávez's nickname for the Short Symphony)." Copland thanked Chávez in 1946 for also including the symphony as one of the ten "most deserving modern works", a list featured in Minna Lederman's journal Modern Music. The composer and critic Arthur Berger commends the work in his review of the 1944 premiere in The New York Sun, admiring that the symphony had "feelings in their essence", though he notes that many of the dissonances were "accidentally interpolated" during the performance. Berger later writes in his 1953 biography of Copland that the symphony "must be included among [Copland's] masterpieces". In his 1985 review of a recording of the symphony, Alan Stout describes the Short Symphony as "one of the undisputed masterpieces of the thirties" and a work that "looks forward to" symphonies by Stravinsky. He also observes that the piece is "more often written about than heard". In a 2000 article, Malcolm MacDonald praises the work as "masterly" and "one of the most impressive achievements of the 1930s modernism".

The Short Symphony struggled to find performers in its first decades and by the 1980s, remained unperformed by many major orchestras. Although Copland viewed the symphony favorably, he did concede in his 1968 book The New Music that the musical language used in works like the Short Symphony was "difficult to perform and difficult for an audience to comprehend". The piece proved challenging enough that ten rehearsals were required before both the Mexico City premiere and the Baden-Baden performance. In a 1981 interview with John Callaway, Copland said that he had always considered the Short Symphony "one of the best things I ever wrote", although "it has never caught on, for reasons not quite clear to me". Despite the symphony's technical difficulties which initially turned away conductors like Leopold Stokowski, the piece became a favorite of younger composers including Leonard Bernstein and Elliott Carter.

The sextet arrangement of the symphony also received critical support. In a 1980 letter to Copland, the American minimalist composer Steve Reich described his Octet as "perhaps a distant cousin of your wonderful Sextet". The critic Gerald Sykes once wrote to Copland in praise of the Sextet's "wonderful sweetness of nature", and the critic Joseph Kerman said that the arrangement was "instantly likeable, musical to the bone."

== Recordings ==
The Short Symphony's first recording was included in the 1969 Columbia record Copland Conducts Copland (MS-7223). In the recording, Copland conducted the London Symphony Orchestra in a performance of the Short Symphony. The critic William Allan describes it as "a major milestone" for the rarely performed work. Recordings of the symphony by groups such as the NBC Symphony Orchestra, the New York Philharmonic, and the San Francisco Symphony were released in subsequent years.

Recordings of the Short Symphony
| Year (Note: Year of recording's release) | Conductor | Orchestra | Duration (Note: In "minutes:seconds" format) | Label | Ref |
|---|---|---|---|---|---|
| 1969 | Aaron Copland | London Symphony Orchestra | — | Columbia Masterworks Records; OCLC 643508741 | |
| 1983 | Dennis Russell Davies | St. Paul Chamber Orchestra | — | Pro Arte; OCLC 10527069 | |
| 1989 | — | Orpheus Chamber Orchestra | 15:48 | Deutsche Grammophon; OCLC 20652806 | |
| 1991 | Aaron Copland | London Symphony Orchestra | 15:37 | Sony Classical Records; OCLC 906155975 | |
| 1992 | Dennis Russell Davies | Orchestra of St. Luke's | 15:58 | MusicMasters; OCLC 1236897189 | |
| 1996 | Leonard Slatkin | St. Louis Symphony Orchestra | 14:19 | RCA Red Seal Records; OCLC 34667147 | |
| 1996 | Michael Tilson Thomas | San Francisco Symphony | 15:24 | RCA Red Seal Records; OCLC 906157762 | |
| 2000 | Michael Tilson Thomas | San Francisco Symphony | 15:24 | RCA Red Seal Records; OCLC 941991065 | |
| 2008 | Marin Alsop | Bournemouth Symphony Orchestra | 15:37 | Naxos Records; OCLC 658204464 | |
| 2010 | Leopold Stokowski | NBC Symphony Orchestra | 15:17 | Guild Historical; OCLC 887982087 | |
| 2013 | Leonard Bernstein | New York Philharmonic (remastered) | 15:07 | West Hill Radio Archive; OCLC 862075064 | |
| 2016 | John Wilson | BBC Philharmonic Orchestra | 15:27 | Chandos Records; OCLC 1027032045 | |
