= Nonet for Strings =

1960 composition by Aaron Copland

Nonet for Strings is a 1960 composition by Aaron Copland. The piece has been labelled alternatively as "Nonet for 3 Violins, 3 Violas, and 3 Cellos."

== Background ==
The New York Philharmonic Orchestra has performed the piece with William Steinberg conducting.

Enthusiasts have cited the work as a great example of Copland's later work, noting that its dissonances are not meant to jar the ear, and that it expands the diatonic collection.
