= Inscape (Copland) =

1967 musical composition for orchestra by Aaron Copland

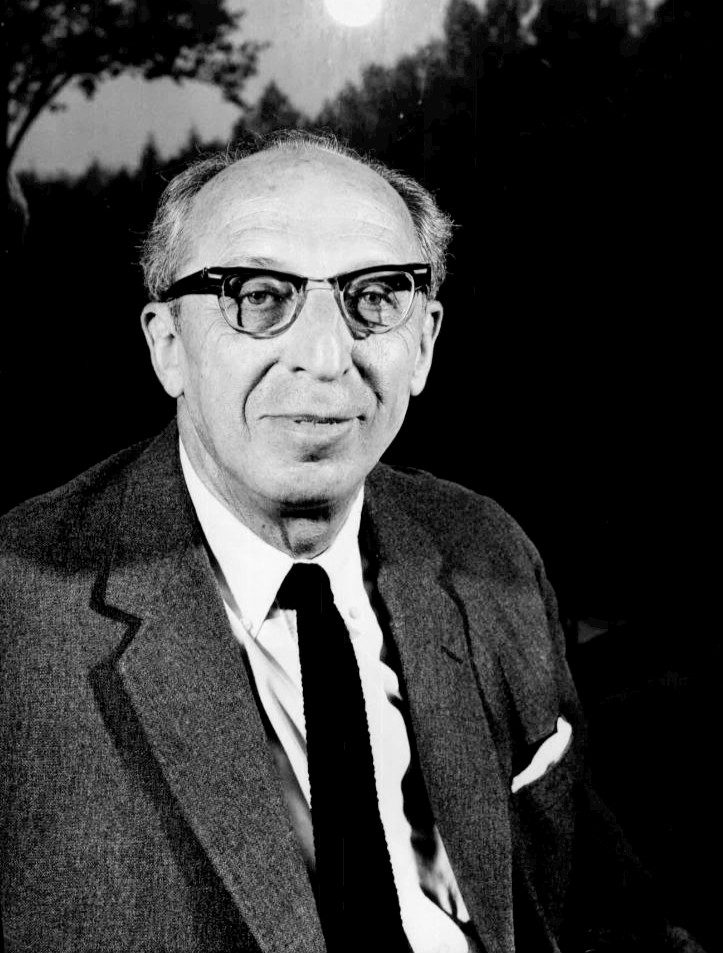
Aaron Copland in 1962

Inscape is a 1967 musical composition for orchestra by Aaron Copland, approximately twelve to thirteen minutes in length, and commissioned by and dedicated to the New York Philharmonic for its 125th anniversary (see also Capriccio burlesco). Composed using the twelve-tone technique, the piece has been considered less accessible than much of Copland's earlier music. It is named for Gerard Manley Hopkins's term "inscape", invented:

to suggest 'a quasi-mystical illumination, a sudden perception of that deeper pattern, order, and unity which gives meaning to external forms.' This description, it seems to me, applies more truly to the creation of music than to any of the other arts.

— Copland

Hopkins's opposite of "inscape" was "instress" ("perception as opposed to intrinsic, essential quality"), and a commentator writes that Copland, "uses sounds as an 'instress' that communicates a deeper inner essence, an 'inscape.'" "The outward appearance is the boundary chords that frame the composition. The inner reality is the first complete statement of Copland's original melodic idea at P-0, which occurs very close to the middle of Inscape."

Row 1: Eb G  F# D  F  Bb A  B  C# G# E [5]
Row 2: F  C  Ab D  G  A  B  Eb C# E  F#[5]

The composition begins and ends with eleven-note chords (it may end on a ten note chord), "perhaps a double tease", and, "if there is one over-arching feature to Inscape, it is the alternation of massive blocks of sound, sometimes quite harsh in their harmony, with quieter sonorities and more peaceable gestures."

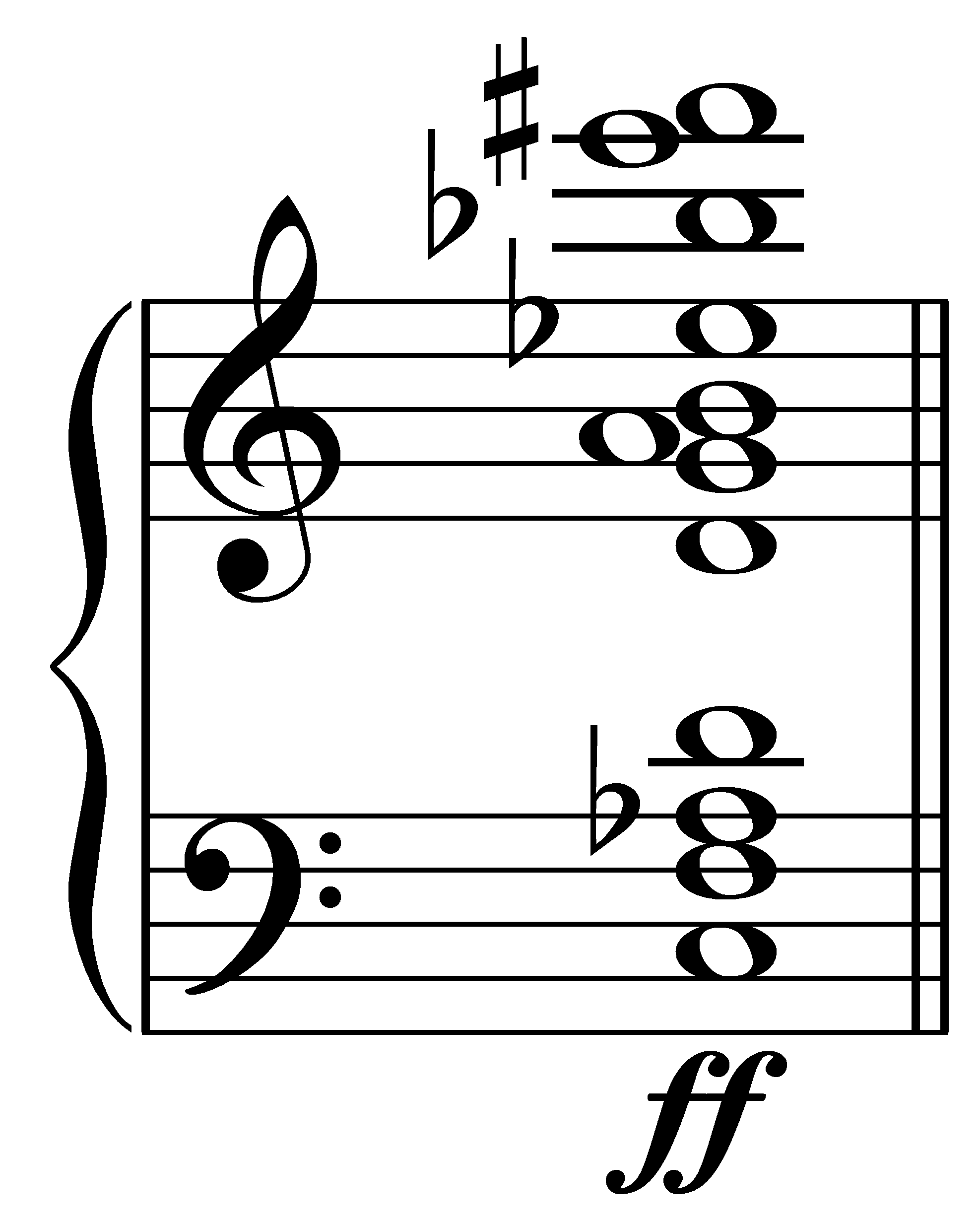
Opening eleven-note chord spacing, orchestration not shown

Copland said that the twelve-tone technique "freshened his harmonic palette" and that the composition uses two different tone rows. Discussing Connotations (1962), he said, "As a result [of using the twelve-tone technique] I began to hear chords I wouldn't have heard otherwise; here was a new way of moving tones about that had a freshening effect on one's technique and approach." However, he stated that Inscape "used it [the technique] in a rather more tonal way than...Connotations." "Through the single, closely-knit movement of Inscape there is no perceptible contradiction between the serial and diatonic elements, rather they dissolve freely into each other to produce music of a stimulating independence of spirit."

Leonard Bernstein remarked after the premiere: "Aaron, it's amazing how, even when you compose in a completely 'foreign' idiom the music still comes out sounding like you." "The writing," also, "bears the unmistakable imprint of Copland's mature personality, in its wide spacing, its spare, lucid textures, often in just two or three parts, and lithe, cumulative rhythms."
