= Four Piano Blues =

Collection of pieces for piano by American composer Aaron Copland

- by Aaron Copland
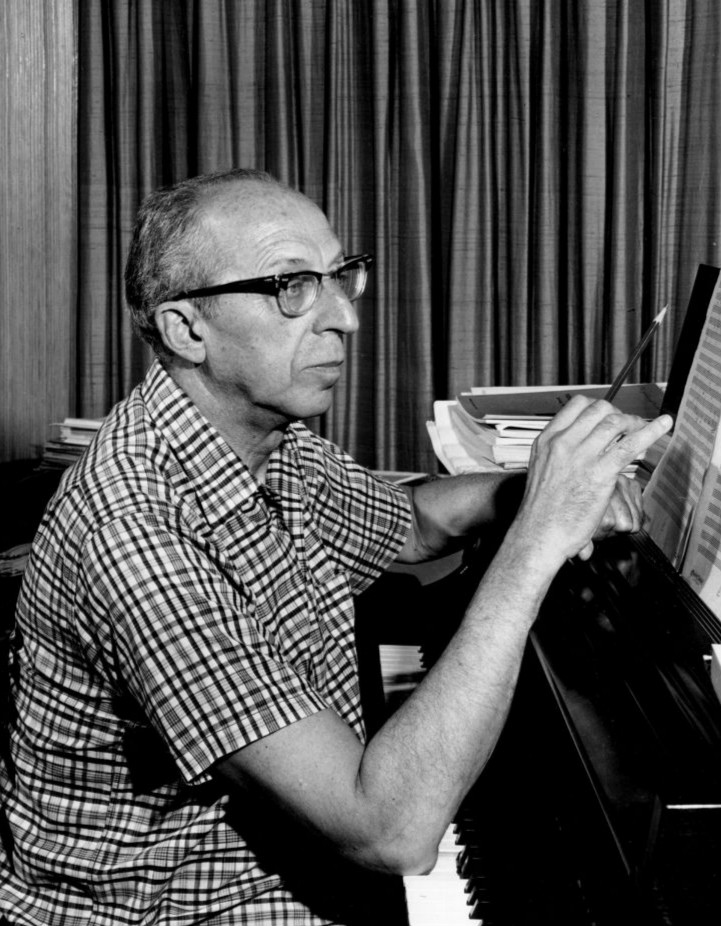
- Aaron Copland in 1962
- Form: Blues
- Composed: 1926–1948:
- Published: 1949:
- Movements: 4
- Scoring: Piano

Four Piano Blues is a collection of pieces for piano by American composer Aaron Copland. The collection was composed between 1926 and 1948.

== Composition ==
The set of short blues for piano is the assembling of two pieces from the '20s and two more from the '40s. The first two pieces were written in 1926, as separate movements of an incomplete suite for piano, entitled Five Sentimental Melodies. This work was largely drawn from other melodies extracted from Copland's Piano Concerto. One of the pieces was initially intended to become a part of another set of two blues. However, Copland published the first blues (entitled Blues No. 1) and left Blues No. 2 unpublished. The other piece was originally entitled Hommage à Milhaud, which he revised again in 1934, and was the basis for the Dove Dance in Copland's Hear Ye! Hear Ye!.

The other two pieces were composed in 1947 and 1948, and were, in turn, the basis for some melodies of Copland's Clarinet Concerto, which was completed in 1948. Upon finishing the concerto, Copland decided to revise all four previously unpublished sketches and published them as Four Piano Blues. The order of the movements was as follows: the 1947 piece, the Hommage à Milhaud, the 1948 piece and, finally, the Blues No. 2. The set as a whole was published by Boosey & Hawkes in 1949. Even though all blues have a title (drawn from their tempo markings) and a subtitle (drawn from their dedicatees), the set was never premiered, as some pieces may have served as encores and short intermezzos.

== Structure ==
The four-movement set takes around 8 to 9 minutes to perform and is scored for solo piano. The movement titles are extracted from their tempo markings. The complete list of pieces is as follows:

1. Freely Poetic
2. Soft and Languid
3. Muted and Sensuous
4. With Bounce

Each different piece has its own dedicatee. The first piece is dedicated to Leo Smit, who was a renowned pianist and photographer specially known for championing Copland's music; the second one, to Andor Foldes, a pianist who was very close to Béla Bartók's music; the third one, to William Kapell, a pianist who was killed in a plane accident a few years after the publication of the set; and, finally, the fourth one, to John Kirkpatrick.

== See also ==
- List of compositions by Aaron Copland
