= El Salón México =

Symphonic work by Aaron Copland

El Salón México
A 25 second sample demonstrating the refrain based on "El palo verde"

El Salón México is a symphonic composition in one movement by Aaron Copland, which uses Mexican folk music extensively. Copland began the work in 1932 and completed it in 1936, following several visits to Mexico. The four melodies of the piece are based on sheet music he purchased during his visits.

== The dance hall ==
The composition, subtitled "A Popular Type Dance Hall in Mexico City," was inspired by a dancing establishment in Mexico City called "El Salón México." El Salón México opened in 1920 and was a popular venue for a wide variety of tunes of dances: waltz, foxtrot, tango, pasodoble, and the Cuban danzón. There was one entrance, but three doors off of it, where patrons sorted themselves by what kind of music and dances they wanted. It was frequented by people from all classes of society. A famous sign in the lower-class room, where barefoot dancing was frequent, stated "Don't throw cigarette butts on the floor because the ladies will burn their feet."

Copland wrote in his autobiography that he had been taken to "El Salón México" by Carlos Chávez, but had first learned of it from a guidebook:

Perhaps my piece might never have been written if it hadn't been for the existence of the Salón México. I remember reading about it for the first time in a tourist guide book: "Harlem-type nightclub for the peepul [ sic in the original ], grand Cuban orchestra. Three halls: one for people dressed in your way, one for people dressed in overalls but shod, and one for the barefoot." When I got there, I also found a sign on the wall which said: "Please don't throw lighted cigarette butts on the floor so the ladies don't burn their feet."

…In some inexplicable way, while milling about in those crowded halls, one really felt a live contact with the Mexican people — the atomic sense one sometimes gets in far-off places, of suddenly knowing the essence of a people — their humanity, their separate shyness, their dignity and unique charm.

== The music ==
The piece is written for a full orchestra consisting of piccolo, 2 flutes, 2 oboes, English horn, 2 clarinets, E♭ clarinet, bass clarinet, 2 bassoons, contrabassoon, 4 horns, 3 trumpets, 3 trombones, tuba, percussion (timpani, bass drum, güiro, snare drum, suspended cymbal, temple blocks, tambourine, wood block, and xylophone), piano, and strings. A performance lasts between 10 and 12 minutes.

Copland began the work in 1932 and completed it in 1936. Orquesta Sinfónica de México gave the first performance under the direction of Carlos Chávez on August 27, 1937. The piece was premiered in the U.S. on May 14, 1938, by Adrian Boult and the NBC Symphony Orchestra. The music is derived from fragments of the traditional Mexican folk songs "El Palo Verde," La Jesusita," "El Mosco" and "El Malacate." The powerful refrain that appears in the piece three times stems from "El Palo Verde."

At least three arrangements of the piece exist in addition to the orchestral score. Copland adapted the work for the 1947 musical film Fiesta, directed by Richard Thorpe for MGM. Leonard Bernstein created arrangements for solo piano and for two pianos, four-hands very shortly after the premiere. In addition, a piano transcription of the score was made by conductor Arturo Toscanini in 1942, when the Maestro included the music on an NBC broadcast concert.

In 2009, filmmakers Paul Glickman and Tamarind King premiered their animated short film El Salón México based on the Copland score at the Film Museum Theater in Santa Fe, New Mexico.

== Recordings ==
Copland conducted recordings of the work for Columbia Records. Leonard Bernstein recorded for Columbia Records and Deutsche Grammophon). Arturo Toscanini and the NBC Symphony Orchestra performed the music in a broadcast concert on March 14, 1942, which was preserved on transcription discs. Other conductors who made recordings of El Salón México include Arthur Fiedler, Eugene Ormandy, and Eduardo Mata. The performance of Serge Koussevitsky and the Boston Symphony Orchestra was recorded in November 1939 as RCA Victor Album M651, transferred to Pearl GEMM 9492. The 1938 U.S. premiere performance by Adrian Boult and the NBC Symphony Orchestra has been issued from transcription discs on Pristine PASC 626.
